= Opinion polling for the 1999 New Zealand general election =

Opinion polling for elections

Opinion polling was commissioned throughout the duration of the 45th New Zealand Parliament in the lead up to the 1999 election by various organisations.

== Party vote ==
Polls are listed in the table below in chronological order. Refusals are generally excluded from the party vote percentages, while question wording and the treatment of "don't know" responses and those not intending to vote may vary between survey firms.

=== Graphical summary ===
Local regression of polls conducted

=== Individual polls ===
Poll	Date (Note: These are the survey dates of the poll, or if the survey dates are not stated, the date the poll was released.)	Labour	National	NZ First	Alliance	ACT	Green	United
1996 election result	12 Oct 1996	28.19	33.87	13.35	10.10	6.10	–	0.88
One News Colmar Brunton	13 Feb 1997	31	45	7	7	4.3	–	0.2
One News Colmar Brunton	13 Mar 1997	32	47	4.2	7	4.4	–	–
One News Colmar Brunton	11 Apr 1997	36	41	5	8	6	–	0.1
One News Colmar Brunton	13 May 1997	42	38	3.8	6	4.7	–	0.1
TV3/CM Research	25 May 1997	45	30	6	6.7	7.1	–	–
One News Colmar Brunton	25 Jun 1997	41	39	4.4	7	4.9	–	0.1
One News Colmar Brunton	10 Jul 1997	42	39	3.8	7	4.5	–	0.2
One News Colmar Brunton	7 Aug 1997	42	39	3.7	9	4.7	–	0
One News Colmar Brunton	18 Sep 1997	45	36	1.9	7	6	–	0.6
TV3/CM Research	11 Oct 1997	49	31	4.5	8.3	5.9	–	–
New Zealand Herald-DigiPoll	13 Oct 1997	50	32	1.7	5.9	4.6	–	–
One News Colmar Brunton	16 Oct 1997	52	30	1.8	7	6	–	0.2
One News Colmar Brunton	4 Nov 1997	45	37	2.3	6	5	–	0.3
One News Colmar Brunton	13 Nov 1997	45	36	2.8	6	7	–	–
TV3/CM Research	23 Nov 1997	45	34	3.1	7.6	7	–	–
8 December 1997 – Jenny Shipley is elected Prime Minister and leader of the National Party after Jim Bolger's resignation.
One News Colmar Brunton	8–10 Dec 1997	46	40	1.1	6	5	0.6	0.1
One News Colmar Brunton	12 Feb 1998	45	42	1.3	5	5	0.4	–
TV3-CM Research	15 Feb 1998	44	38	1.8	7.9	4.4	0.5	–
One News Colmar Brunton	25 Mar 1998	39	42	1.6	5	8	0.6	0.3
TV3/CM Research	21 Apr 1998	38	42	2.2	6.3	6.1	0.4	–
One News Colmar Brunton	23 Apr 1998	38	46	2.5	6	5	0.4	0.3
2 May 1998 – National narrowly wins the Taranaki-King Country by-election after Bolger's resignation.
New Zealand Herald-DigiPoll	11 May 1998	34.7	38.3	1.7	8.5	11.8	1.4	–
TV3/CM Research	14 May 1998	37	41	2.1	8	9	0.2	0.1
One News Colmar Brunton	18 Jun 1998	37	37	2.1	9	11	0.5	0.1
One News Colmar Brunton	9 Jul 1998	42	36	1.9	9	8	0.2	–
TV3-CM Research	10 Jul 1998	42	36	2.3	9.9	5.1	1	–
One News Colmar Brunton	6 Aug 1998	40	39	2.6	9	6	0.7	–
New Zealand Herald-DigiPoll	11 Aug 1998	46.1	32.6	2.2	9.7	5.9	–	–
One News Colmar Brunton	13 Aug 1998	41	39	2.9	9	5	–	–
14 August 1998 – Winston Peters is sacked from cabinet by Shipley ending the coalition between National and New Zealand First.
TV3/CM Research	13 Sep 1998	42	35	4.4	9.1	4.7	0.4	–
One News Colmar Brunton	22 Sep 1998	42	41	1.8	7	6	0.3	–
One News Colmar Brunton	15 Oct 1998	48	35	2	6	6	0.7	0.1
One News Colmar Brunton	16 Nov 1998	48	34	2	7	6	0.5	–
TV3/CM Research	17 Nov 1998	49	32	3	5	5	1	–
New Zealand Herald-Digipoll	7 Dec 1998	51	32	3.5	6	4.5	–	–
One News Colmar Brunton	10 Dec 1998	45	35	2.4	8	5	0.4	0.1
One News Colmar Brunton	11 Feb 1999	42	41	2.6	7	3.9	0.7	–
TV3/CM Research	14 Feb 1999	43	37	3	7	5	1	–
One News Colmar Brunton	23 Mar 1999	39	42	2.2	7	6	0.6	0.4
TV3/CM Research	18 Apr 1999	41	37	3	8	5	1	–
One News Colmar Brunton	27 Apr 1999	44	38	1.5	6	6	0.5	0.4
One News Colmar Brunton	19 May 1999	44	39	2.6	7	4.4	0.9	0.2
One News Colmar Brunton	17 Jun 1999	42	41	1.9	6	4.9	1.4	–
TV3/CM Research	20 Jun 1999	46	33	4	7	4	1.4	–
One News Colmar Brunton	13 Jul 1999	44	38	1.8	6	4.7	0.9	0.2
TV3/CM Research	25 Jul 1999	38	37	4.7	8	6	1.5	–
One News Colmar Brunton	5 August 1999	40	38	4	7	7	1.1	–
TV3/CM Research	22 August 1999	40	32	7	7	6	2.6	–
New Zealand Herald-DigiPoll	28 Aug – 3 Sep 1999	43.8	35.7	5.5	5	–	3.1	–
One News Colmar Brunton	16 Sep 1999	41	35	4.1	7	5	1.9	0.2
TV3/CM Research	19 Sep 1999	39	33	7	6	7	2.4	–
TV3/CM Research	10 Oct 1999	40	36	4	8	7	2	–
TV3/CM Research	20 Oct 1999	37	33	6	7	9	2.5	–
One News Colmar Brunton	18 Oct 1999	39	37	6	4.5	7	1	0.5
New Zealand Herald-Digipoll	5 Nov 1999	35.2	34	1	8.7	9.2	2.9	0.3
TV3/CM Research	7 Nov 1999	41	28	6	7	10	2.9	–
One News Colmar Brunton	11 Nov 1999	34	33	6	9	11	2.4	0.1
TV3/CM Research	17 Nov 1999	37	30	6	9	9	2.8	–
New Zealand Herald-Digipoll	26 Nov 1999	39.8	29.9	3.6	7.7	8.5	5.4	–
One News Colmar Brunton	26 Nov 1999	39	31	3.2	8	7	6	0.7
TV3/CM Research	26 Nov 1999	34	29	5.5	9	11	6	–
1999 election result	27 Nov 1999	38.74	30.50	4.26	7.74	7.04	5.16	0.54

== Preferred prime minister ==
=== Individual polls ===
Poll	Date	Helen Clark	Jim Bolger	Jenny Shipley	Winston Peters	Jim Anderton	Richard Prebble	Mike Moore
One News Colmar Brunton	13 May 1997	21	20	6	4	6	–	5
One News Colmar Brunton	25 Jun 1997	26	21	4	4	5	–	4
One News Colmar Brunton	13 Aug 1997	25	20	9	3	7	–	–
8 December 1997 – Jenny Shipley is elected Prime Minister and leader of the National Party after Jim Bolger's resignation.
One News Colmar Brunton	8 – 10 Dec 1997	28	5	27	2	–	–	–
One News Colmar Brunton	12 Feb 1998	26	3	27	1	5	–	3
TV3-CM Research	15 Feb 1998	28	4	20	2	5	–	5
One News Colmar Brunton	25 Mar 1998	23	3	31	3	4	–	3
TV3-CM Research	10 Jul 1998	21	–	22	–	–	–	–
One News Colmar Brunton	11 Aug 1998	22	–	28	2	9	2	–
14 August 1998 – Winston Peters is sacked from cabinet by Shipley ending the coalition between National and New Zealand First.
One News Colmar Brunton	22 Sep 1998	23	–	28	3	7	1	–
TV3/CM Research	17 Nov 1998	24	–	15	4	6	–	–
One News Colmar Brunton	23 Mar 1999	21	–	29	–	–	–	–
One News Colmar Brunton	27 Apr 1999	21	–	27	3	5	1	–
One News Colmar Brunton	19 May 1999	22	–	27	4	6	1	–
New Zealand Herald-DigiPoll	11 Aug 1999	19.5	–	17.6	2.4	6.4	–	3
New Zealand Herald-DigiPoll	8 Sep 1999	19.5	1.1	16	6.9	4.4	1.8	1.7
One News Colmar Brunton	26 Nov 1999	30	–	27	–	–	–	–
TV3/CM Research	26 Nov 1999	23	–	20	–	–	–	–

== Electorate polling ==
=== Coromandel ===
Poll	Date	Tony Bird	Jeanette Fitzsimons	Margaret Hawkeswood	Robyn McDonald	Murray McLean
Reid Research	5–8 Aug 1999	6	33	20	10	31
Sunday Star Times/UMR Insight	24 Oct 1999	–	34	15	–	37
TV1 Colmar Brunton	10 Nov 1999	8	39	13	4	36
Dominion/UMR Insight	15 Nov 1999	–	43	11	–	35
TV1 Colmar Brunton	18–21 Nov 1999	3	44	11	–	39
1999 election result	27 Nov 1999	3.56	39.98	11.37	3.61	39.25

=== Wellington Central ===
Poll	Date	Marian Hobbs	Richard Prebble
TV1 Colmar Brunton	8 Nov 1999	48	47
1999 election result	27 Nov 1999	48.37	44.27

=== Ikaroa-Rāwhiti ===
Poll	Date	Derek Fox	Bill Gudgeon	Parekura Horomia	Dalvanius Prime	Des Ratima	Vicky Robin	Tauni Sinclair
Marae		31.7	10.9	34.6	3.9	4.2	2.9	3.3
Marae	21 Nov 1999	34	–	36.6	–	–	–	–
1999 election result	27 Nov 1999	37.16	5.97	40.99	—	5.27	0.77	—

=== Waiariki ===
Poll	Date	Tuariki Delamere	Mita Ririnui
Marae	21 Nov 1999	27.1	30
1999 election result	27 Nov 1999	20.01	45.11

== See also ==
- 1999 New Zealand general election
- Politics of New Zealand
