= Whangapoua =

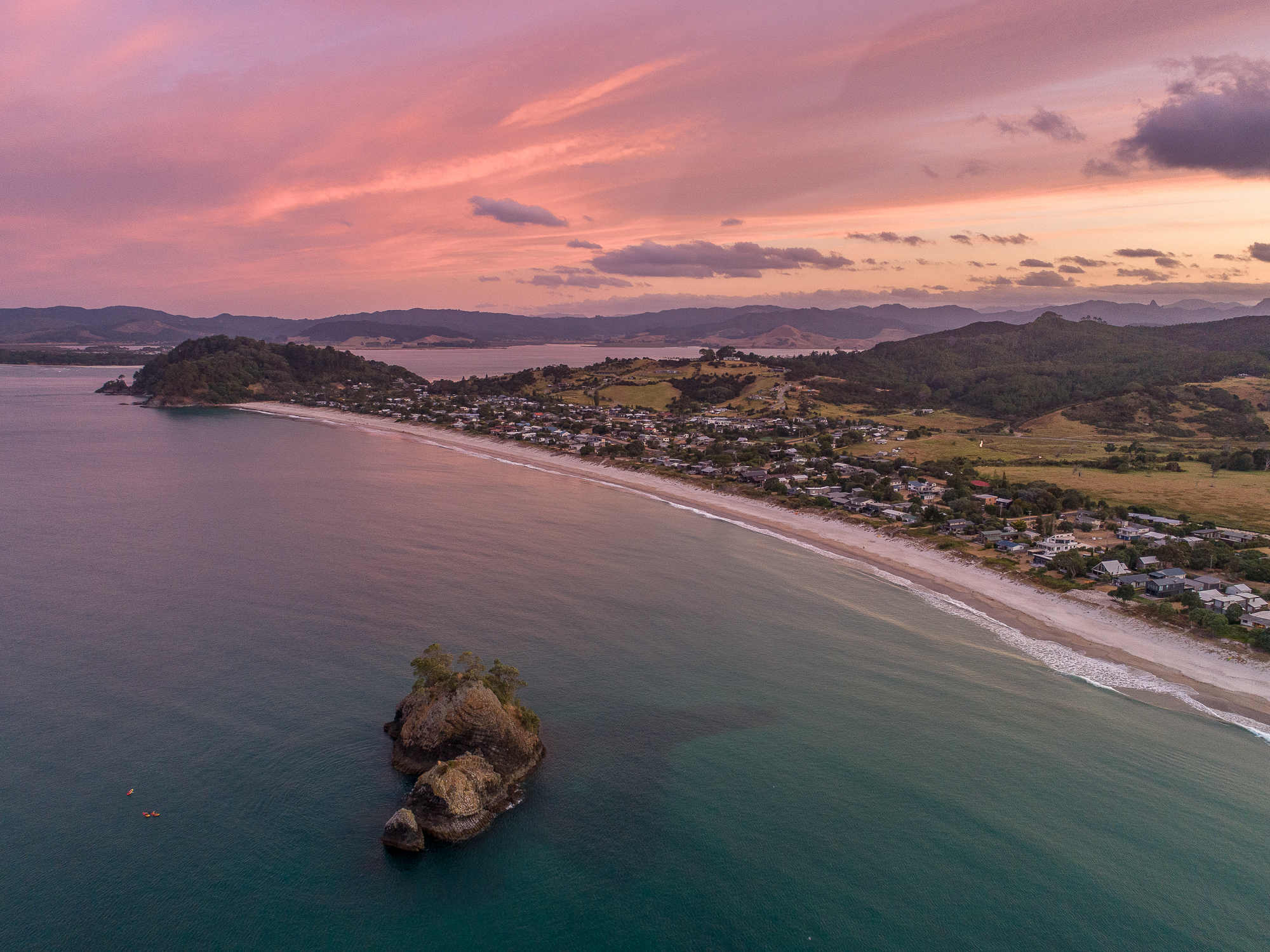
- Aerial overview of Whangapoua
- Interactive map of Whangapoua
- Coordinates: 36°42′49″S 175°36′54″E
- Country: New Zealand
- Region: Waikato
- District: Thames-Coromandel District
- Ward: Mercury Bay ward
- Community Board: Mercury Bay Community
- Electorates: Coromandel; Hauraki-Waikato (Māori)

Government
  - Council: Thames-Coromandel District Council
  - Regional council: Waikato Regional Council
  - Mayor of Thames-Coromandel: Peter Revell
  - Coromandel MP: Scott Simpson
  - Hauraki-Waikato MP: Hana-Rawhiti Maipi-Clarke

Area
  - Total: 0.74 km^{2} (0.29 sq mi)

Population (June 2025)
  - Total: 100
  - Density: 140/km^{2} (350/sq mi)

Whangapoua is a small settlement of mostly holiday houses located on the Coromandel Peninsula of New Zealand. It is situated 25 minutes drive east over the Coromandel Range from Coromandel along the northeastern coastline encompassing popular white sand beaches New Chums Beach, Matarangi, Kuaotunu Beach and Otama Beach.

Amenities in Whangapoua include a small wharf and boat ramp, and a general store that also supplies petrol and diesel. The nearby estuary provides further water access for boats. Whangapoua Beach is a safe 1.5km long sandy swimming beach flanked in the north by the rocky foreshore towards Motuto Point and by Te Rehutae Point in the southeast.

The northern end of Whangapoua Beach is the starting point of a partly unformed track to New Chums Beach - that beach is only accessible via this track at low tide or by boat. The nearest school is in Te Rerenga.

== History ==
Whangapoua's Māori history dates back to the 13th century. A reserve at Opera Point, east of Whangapoua, contains the remains of the Raukawa pa site. European settlers started arriving in the 1860s, drawn to the area chiefly for kauri milling and gold mining.

Today, Whangapoua is spread along behind the beach and consists of about 120 permanent residents, but can swell to over 1000 with holiday residents during the most popular holiday period from late December to February.

== Demographics ==
Whangapoua is described by Statistics New Zealand as a rural settlement. It covers 0.74 km^{2} (0.29 sq mi) and had an estimated population of 100 as of June 2025, with a population density of 135 people per km^{2}. Whangapoua is part of the larger Mercury Bay North statistical area.

Historical population
Year	Pop.	±% p.a.
2006	54	—
2013	42	−3.53%
2018	75	+12.30%
2023	84	+2.29%

Whangapoua had a population of 84 in the 2023 New Zealand census, an increase of 9 people (12.0%) since the 2018 census, and an increase of 42 people (100.0%) since the 2013 census. There were 42 males and 39 females in 51 dwellings. 3.6% of people identified as LGBTIQ+. The median age was 57.9 years (compared with 38.1 years nationally). There were 12 people (14.3%) aged under 15 years, 6 (7.1%) aged 15 to 29, 33 (39.3%) aged 30 to 64, and 30 (35.7%) aged 65 or older.

People could identify as more than one ethnicity. The results were 89.3% European (Pākehā), 17.9% Māori, 3.6% Pasifika, and 7.1% other, which includes people giving their ethnicity as "New Zealander". English was spoken by 100.0%, Māori language by 10.7%, and other languages by 10.7%. The percentage of people born overseas was 7.1, compared with 28.8% nationally.

Religious affiliations were 35.7% Christian, and 3.6% other religions. People who answered that they had no religion were 53.6%, and 10.7% of people did not answer the census question.

Of those at least 15 years old, 18 (25.0%) people had a bachelor's or higher degree, 42 (58.3%) had a post-high school certificate or diploma, and 15 (20.8%) people exclusively held high school qualifications. The median income was $33,600, compared with $41,500 nationally. 6 people (8.3%) earned over $100,000 compared to 12.1% nationally. The employment status of those at least 15 was that 27 (37.5%) people were employed full-time, 3 (4.2%) were part-time, and 6 (8.3%) were unemployed.
