= Opitonui River =

Coordinates: 36°45′S 175°37′E

Location
- Country: New Zealand

Physical characteristics
- Source
  - location: Coromandel Range
- Mouth
  - location: Whangapoua Harbour
- Length: 10 km (6.2 mi)

The Opitonui River is a river of the Coromandel Peninsula in New Zealand's North Island. It flows north to reach the peninsula's east coast at Whangapoua Harbour, close to the small settlement of Te Rerenga. The river provides a water supply for Matarangi by way of a pipe laid across the Whangapoua harbour.

== See also ==
- List of rivers of New Zealand
