= Otama Beach =

Beach and settlement in New Zealand

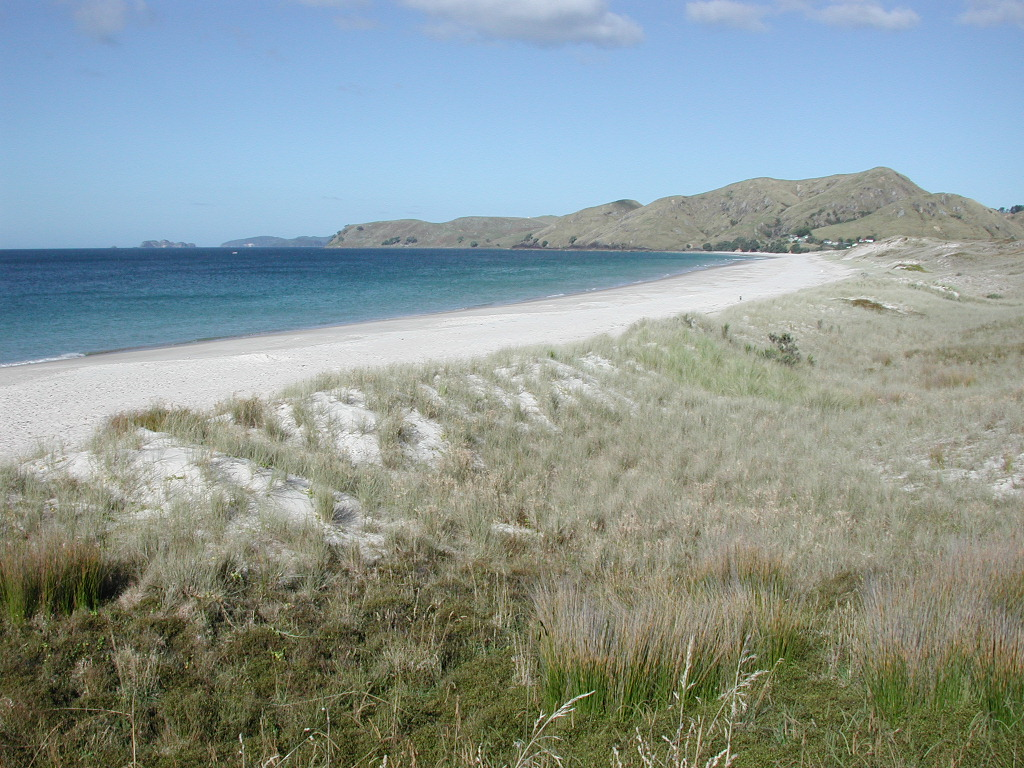
- Otama Beach
- Interactive map of Otama Beach
- Coordinates: 36.707°S 175.764°E
- Country: New Zealand
- Region: Waikato
- District: Thames-Coromandel District
- Ward: Mercury Bay ward
- Community Board: Mercury Bay Community
- Electorates: Coromandel; Hauraki-Waikato (Māori)

Government
  - Council: Thames-Coromandel District Council
  - Regional council: Waikato Regional Council
  - Mayor of Thames-Coromandel: Peter Revell
  - Coromandel MP: Scott Simpson
  - Hauraki-Waikato MP: Hana-Rawhiti Maipi-Clarke

Otama Beach is a beach and settlement on the northeast coast of the Coromandel Peninsula, New Zealand, 20 km north of Whitianga.

The north-facing 2 km long white-sand beach is backed by a large protected natural dune system, separating it from the road and farm land beyond. Access is via Black Jack Road, starting from State Highway 25 at Kūaotunu, which is sealed up to the start of Otama Beach. It continues as a gravel road further east towards Opito Bay.

Otama Beach is almost completely undeveloped, with only a small number of houses, mostly holiday homes, dotted around the hills behind the eastern end of the beach. The white sand squeaks when walked on, and the beach is a very good swimming beach, occasionally with good conditions for surfing. The rolling dunes and the wetland nature reserve behind it are protected, containing delicate flora such as the rare sand tussock Poa triodioides (syn. Austrofestuca littoralis), and nesting areas of the endangered New Zealand dotterel.

== Demographics ==
Otama Beach is in an SA1 statistical area which covers 45.92 km^{2} (17.73 sq mi) east of State Highway 25, and includes Opito Bay. The SA1 area is part of the larger Mercury Bay North statistical area.

Historical populations for Otama Beach and surrounds
Year	Pop.	±% p.a.
2013	111	—
2018	129	+3.05%
2023	159	+4.27%

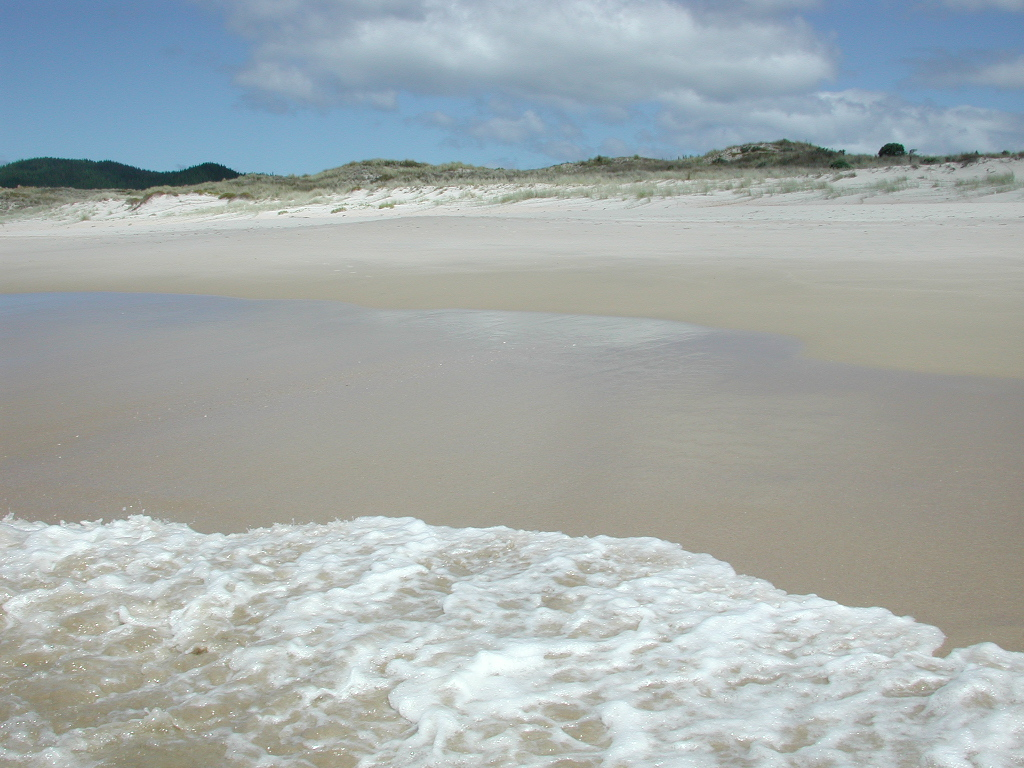
Waves on the Otama Beach

The SA1 statistical area had a population of 159 in the 2023 New Zealand census, an increase of 30 people (23.3%) since the 2018 census, and an increase of 48 people (43.2%) since the 2013 census. There were 87 males and 72 females in 75 dwellings. 3.8% of people identified as LGBTIQ+. The median age was 59.0 years (compared with 38.1 years nationally). There were 15 people (9.4%) aged under 15 years, 9 (5.7%) aged 15 to 29, 66 (41.5%) aged 30 to 64, and 66 (41.5%) aged 65 or older.

People could identify as more than one ethnicity. The results were 98.1% European (Pākehā), 7.5% Māori, and 3.8% other, which includes people giving their ethnicity as "New Zealander". English was spoken by 100.0%, and other languages by 7.5%. The percentage of people born overseas was 24.5, compared with 28.8% nationally.

The only religious affiliation given was 28.3% Christian. People who answered that they had no religion were 64.2%, and 7.5% of people did not answer the census question.

Of those at least 15 years old, 42 (29.2%) people had a bachelor's or higher degree, 81 (56.2%) had a post-high school certificate or diploma, and 27 (18.8%) people exclusively held high school qualifications. The median income was $25,600, compared with $41,500 nationally. 18 people (12.5%) earned over $100,000 compared to 12.1% nationally. The employment status of those at least 15 was that 39 (27.1%) people were employed full-time, 33 (22.9%) were part-time, and 3 (2.1%) were unemployed.
