= Matarangi =

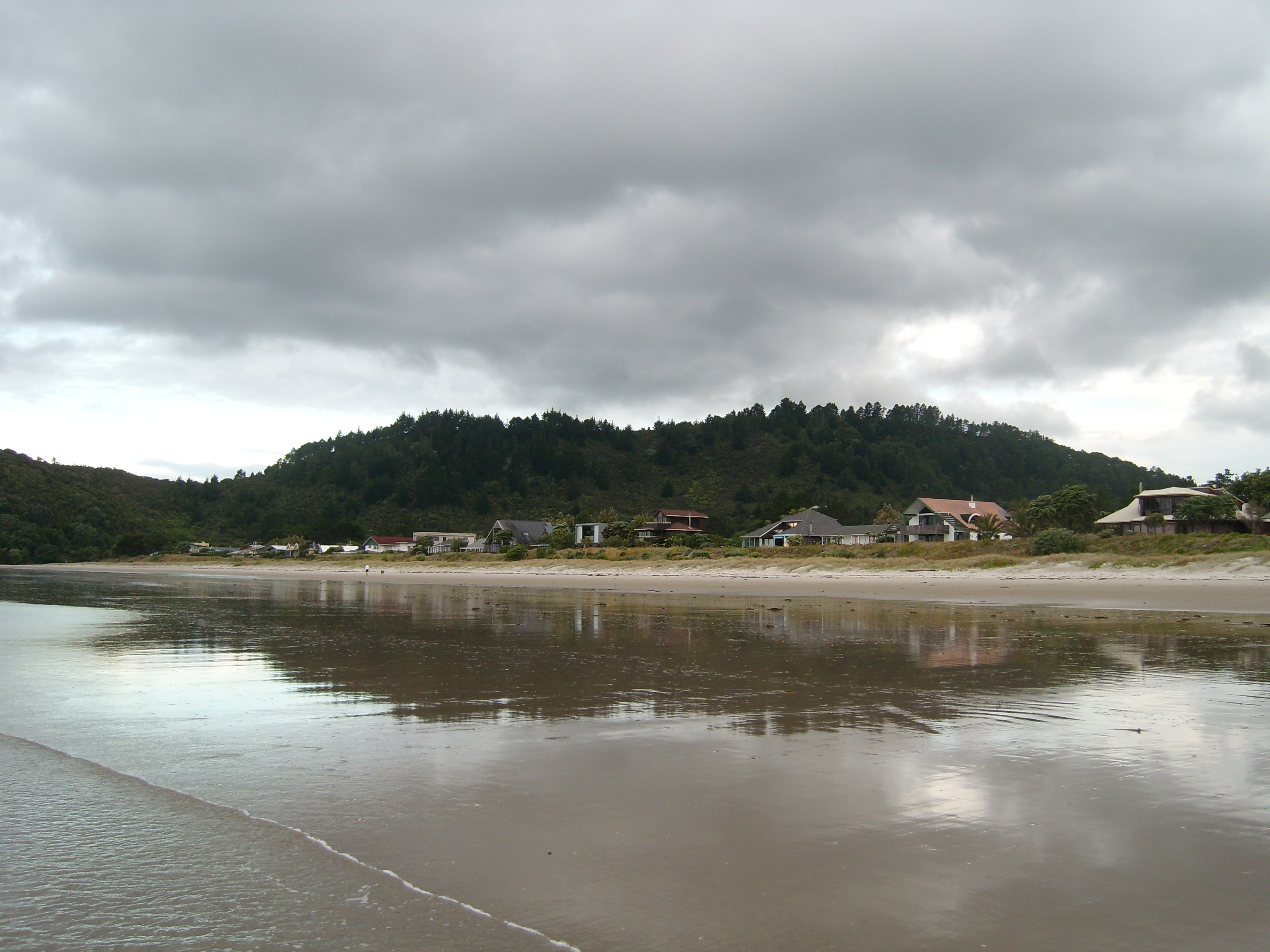
- Matarangi Beach
- Interactive map of Matarangi
- Coordinates: 36°43′55″S 175°40′14″E
- Country: New Zealand
- Region: Waikato
- District: Thames-Coromandel District
- Ward: Mercury Bay ward
- Community Board: Mercury Bay Community
- Electorates: Coromandel; Hauraki-Waikato (Māori)

Government
  - Council: Thames-Coromandel District Council
  - Regional council: Waikato Regional Council
  - Mayor of Thames-Coromandel: Peter Revell
  - Coromandel MP: Scott Simpson
  - Hauraki-Waikato MP: Hana-Rawhiti Maipi-Clarke

Area
  - Total: 3.92 km^{2} (1.51 sq mi)

Population (June 2025)
  - Total: 710
  - Density: 180/km^{2} (470/sq mi)

Matarangi is a beach settlement on the Coromandel Peninsula of New Zealand, with around 650 permanent residents in 2023 which increases to over 7000 holidaymakers during the summer period of late December to February. It was developed in the 1980s as a purpose-built resort town and occupies a white sand peninsula between the Whangapoua Harbour and historic Mercury Bay. It is half an hour from the towns of Coromandel to the west and Whitianga to the south east.

Matarangi has a mix of older, smaller holiday houses (known in New Zealand as baches), while waterfront sections have luxury holiday homes and prestige lifestyles. The main attraction for families is the 4 km long white sand ocean beach which provides safe swimming all year round and surfing when the conditions are right. Beach access is from Kenwood Drive which leads to the Village Green with picnic facilities and a playground or from Ocean Close. The harbour also offers swimming, boating, kite surfing, fishing and bird watching, with an upgraded boat ramp, boat parking and picnic area. Occupying the scenic end of the sand spit ″the pines″ is "The Dunes", a Bob Charles-designed championship eighteen-hole golf course with a licensed club house, restaurant and pro shop. There is also a bowling green and there are several public tennis courts in the town.

The small shopping centre has a Four Square store, liquor outlet, cafe, gift store and two real estate agencies. Accommodation consists of Matarangi Villas close to the golf course and holiday homes that can be rented privately or through holiday rental agents.

== Demographics ==
Matarangi is described by Statistics New Zealand as a rural settlement. It covers 3.92 km^{2} (1.51 sq mi) and had an estimated population of 710 as of June 2025, with a population density of 181 people per km^{2}. Matarangi is part of the larger Mercury Bay North statistical area.

Historical population
Year	Pop.	±% p.a.
2006	252	—
2013	303	+2.67%
2018	420	+6.75%
2023	651	+9.16%

Matarangi had a population of 651 in the 2023 New Zealand census, an increase of 231 people (55.0%) since the 2018 census, and an increase of 348 people (114.9%) since the 2013 census. There were 318 males, 333 females and 3 people of other genders in 327 dwellings. 1.4% of people identified as LGBTIQ+. The median age was 55.9 years (compared with 38.1 years nationally). There were 102 people (15.7%) aged under 15 years, 51 (7.8%) aged 15 to 29, 276 (42.4%) aged 30 to 64, and 222 (34.1%) aged 65 or older.

People could identify as more than one ethnicity. The results were 93.5% European (Pākehā), 15.7% Māori, 2.3% Pasifika, 2.3% Asian, and 3.7% other, which includes people giving their ethnicity as "New Zealander". English was spoken by 98.2%, Māori language by 2.8%, and other languages by 5.1%. No language could be spoken by 2.3% (e.g. too young to talk). The percentage of people born overseas was 17.5, compared with 28.8% nationally.

Religious affiliations were 27.6% Christian, 0.5% Māori religious beliefs, 0.9% Buddhist, 0.9% New Age, and 0.9% other religions. People who answered that they had no religion were 62.2%, and 7.4% of people did not answer the census question.

Of those at least 15 years old, 120 (21.9%) people had a bachelor's or higher degree, 324 (59.0%) had a post-high school certificate or diploma, and 105 (19.1%) people exclusively held high school qualifications. The median income was $30,300, compared with $41,500 nationally. 48 people (8.7%) earned over $100,000 compared to 12.1% nationally. The employment status of those at least 15 was that 192 (35.0%) people were employed full-time, 96 (17.5%) were part-time, and 12 (2.2%) were unemployed.
