= Otama =

Otama may refer to:

- HMAS Otama, formerly a submarine of the Royal Australian Navy
- Otama, Fukushima, a village in Japan
- Otama Beach on New Zealand's Coromandel Peninsula
