= Waitekuri River =

Coordinates: 36°45′S 175°37′E

Location
- Country: New Zealand

Physical characteristics
- Source
  - location: Coromandel Range
- Mouth
  - location: Whangapoua Harbour
- Length: 10 km (6.2 mi)

The Waitekuri River is a river of the Coromandel Peninsula in New Zealand's North Island. It flows east from its sources in the Coromandel Range east of Coromandel to reach Whangapoua Harbour four kilometres south of Whangapoua.

== See also ==
- List of rivers of New Zealand
