= Sandra Goudie =

New Zealand politician

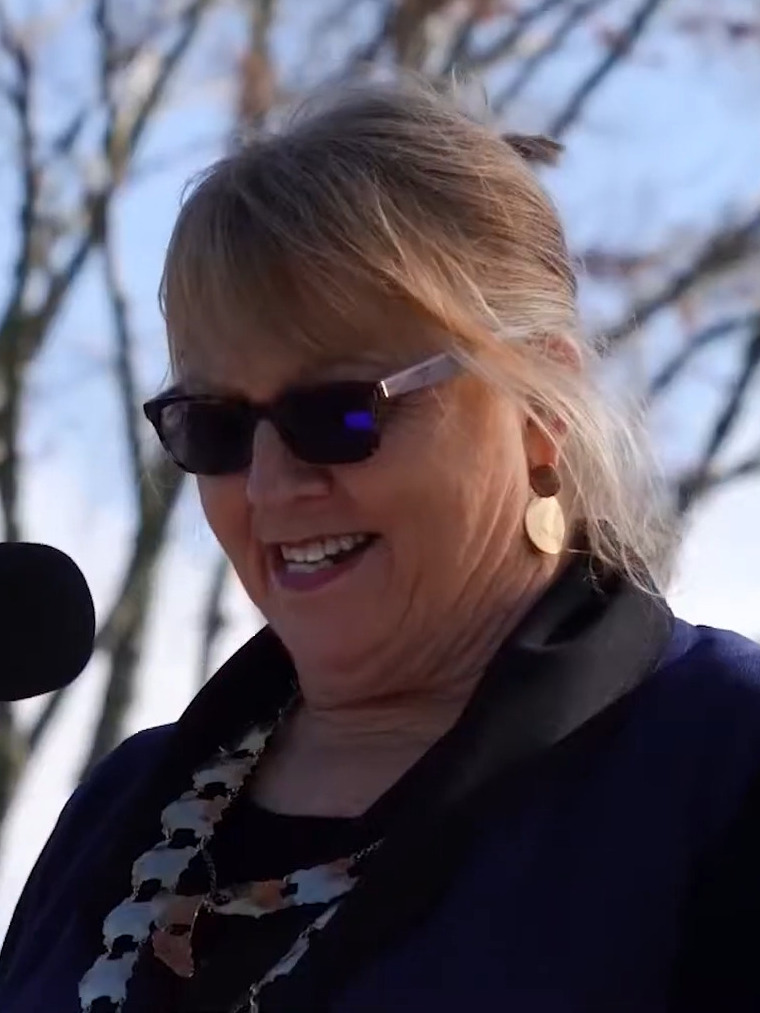
- Goudie in 2019

8th Mayor of Thames-Coromandel
- In office 8 October 2016 – 8 October 2022
- Deputy: Tony Brljevich
- Preceded by: Glenn Leach
- Succeeded by: Len Salt

Member of the New Zealand Parliament for Coromandel
- In office 27 July 2002 – 26 November 2011
- Preceded by: Jeanette Fitzsimons
- Succeeded by: Scott Simpson
- Majority: 5,958

Personal details
- Born: 1952 (age 73–74)
- Party: National Party

Sandra Anne Goudie (born 1952) is a New Zealand politician. She was the mayor of Thames-Coromandel from 2016 to 2022 when she resigned. She was the Member of Parliament for the Coromandel electorate from 2002 to 2011, representing the National Party. During the COVID-19 pandemic she was criticised for her anti-vaccination stance.

== Early years ==
Goudie was a dairy farmer before entering politics. She was elected to the Thames-Coromandel District Council in 1998, and held that role until 2003.

== Member of Parliament ==
New Zealand Parliament
Years	Term	Electorate	List	Party
2002–2005	47th	Coromandel	42	National
2005–2008	48th	Coromandel	26	National
2008–2011	49th	Coromandel	27	National

Goudie was elected to Parliament in the 2002 election, narrowly winning the seat of Coromandel by defeating Labour candidate Max Purnell and pushing incumbent Green MP Jeanette Fitzsimons into third place.

Goudie was re-elected in the 2005 election with a 9700 vote majority. The day after the election, Goudie participated in a protest clearing mangroves in the Whangamata Harbour against environmental regulations.

Goudie retained her seat in the 2008 election, with a majority of 14,560. During the 2008 term, Goudie was the National Party's opposition spokesperson on Internal Affairs, Senior Citizens and Associate Local Government until 2008.

She retired from parliament at the 2011 general election, citing the need to spend more time with her family. She was succeeded by Scott Simpson.

In 2012 Goudie left the National Party and joined Focus NZ, a small rural-based political party which subsequently deregistered in 2016.

== Local government ==
At the 2016 local elections, Goudie was elected as the mayor of Thames-Coromandel, with a 498-vote majority. Goudie was re-elected at the 2019 local elections, increasing her majority to 7560. In 2022, she did not seek re-election, and was succeeded as mayor by Len Salt.

=== Vaccination controversy ===
In August 2021 a person infected with COVID-19 visited the Coromandel, prompting concern that there could be community transmission of the virus. Goudie attracted media attention when she said that she did not normally use the NZ COVID Tracer app and that the outbreak would probably not encourage her to scan more often. She later said that had been a throwaway remark, that she had been complacent about using the app, but that she would now use the COVID tracer app and urged everyone to do so.

In October 2021 Goudie received media attention when she said that she was not vaccinated, and would not take the Pfizer vaccine, saying that she would instead wait for the Novavax vaccine to be approved in New Zealand. She did not give reasons for this, but public health academic Siouxsie Wiles said that Goudie's actions were "putting others in danger." She was criticised by COVID-19 Response Minister Chris Hipkins in a media conference. Despite her stance on the Pfizer vaccine, Goudie and the Thames-Coromandel District Council voted unanimously to support the COVID-19 vaccine rollout in October 2021.

In December, Thames-Coromandel councillor Gary Gotlieb lodged a complaint against Goudie due to her COVID-19 vaccination stance and for speaking to an Australian anti-vaccination group called Reignite Democracy Australia on 11 November. The Thames-Coromandel District Council decided not to proceed with the investigation, opting to resolve the issue informally.

In February 2022, after Novavax was approved in New Zealand, Goudie said that she would not take it despite her earlier statements. Goudie stood by her decision in early March 2022.

=== Climate change controversy ===
In 2019, Goudie refused to confirm whether she believed climate change was happening, and refused to sign the Local Government Leaders' Climate Change Declaration.

In February 2022 she was still refusing to sign the Declaration, despite a majority of councillors on the Thames Coromandel District Council endorsing it.

In March 2022 the Declaration was signed on behalf of Thames Coromandel District Council by another councillor, with Mayor Goudie being the only vote against doing so.

In May 2022, Goudie announced that she would be retiring at the October 2022 election.

New Zealand Parliament
Preceded by Jeanette Fitzsimons	Member of Parliament for Coromandel; 2002–2011	Succeeded by Scott Simpson
