= 1999 New Zealand general election =

General election in New Zealand

- 27 November 1999

All 120 seats in the House of Representatives 61 seats needed for a majority
- Opinion polls
- Registered: 2,509,365
- Turnout: 2,127,295; 84.77% (▼3.51%)
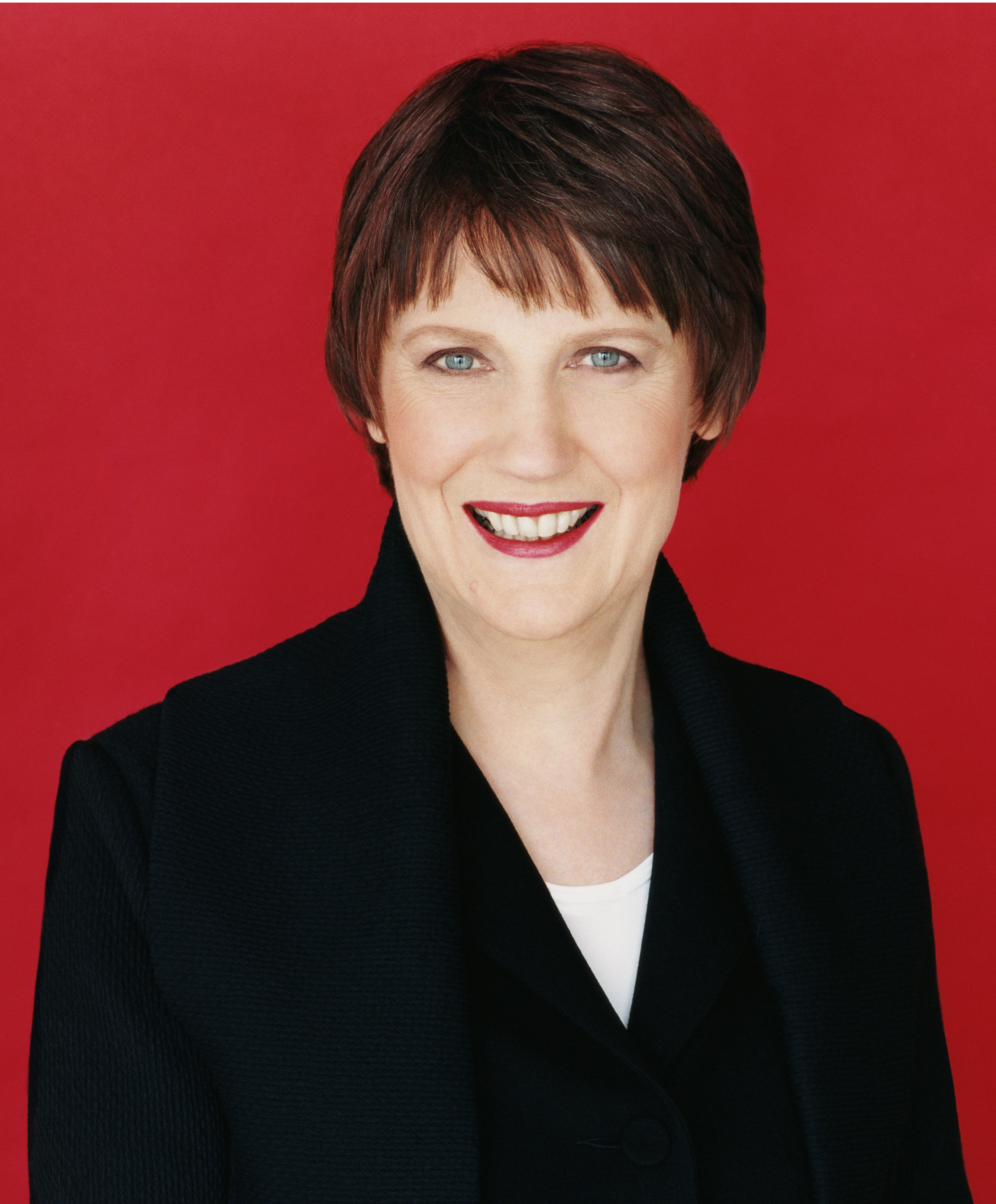

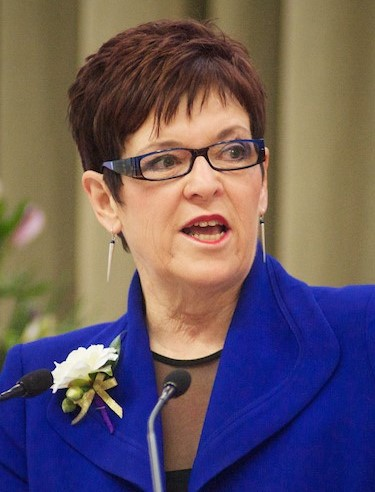

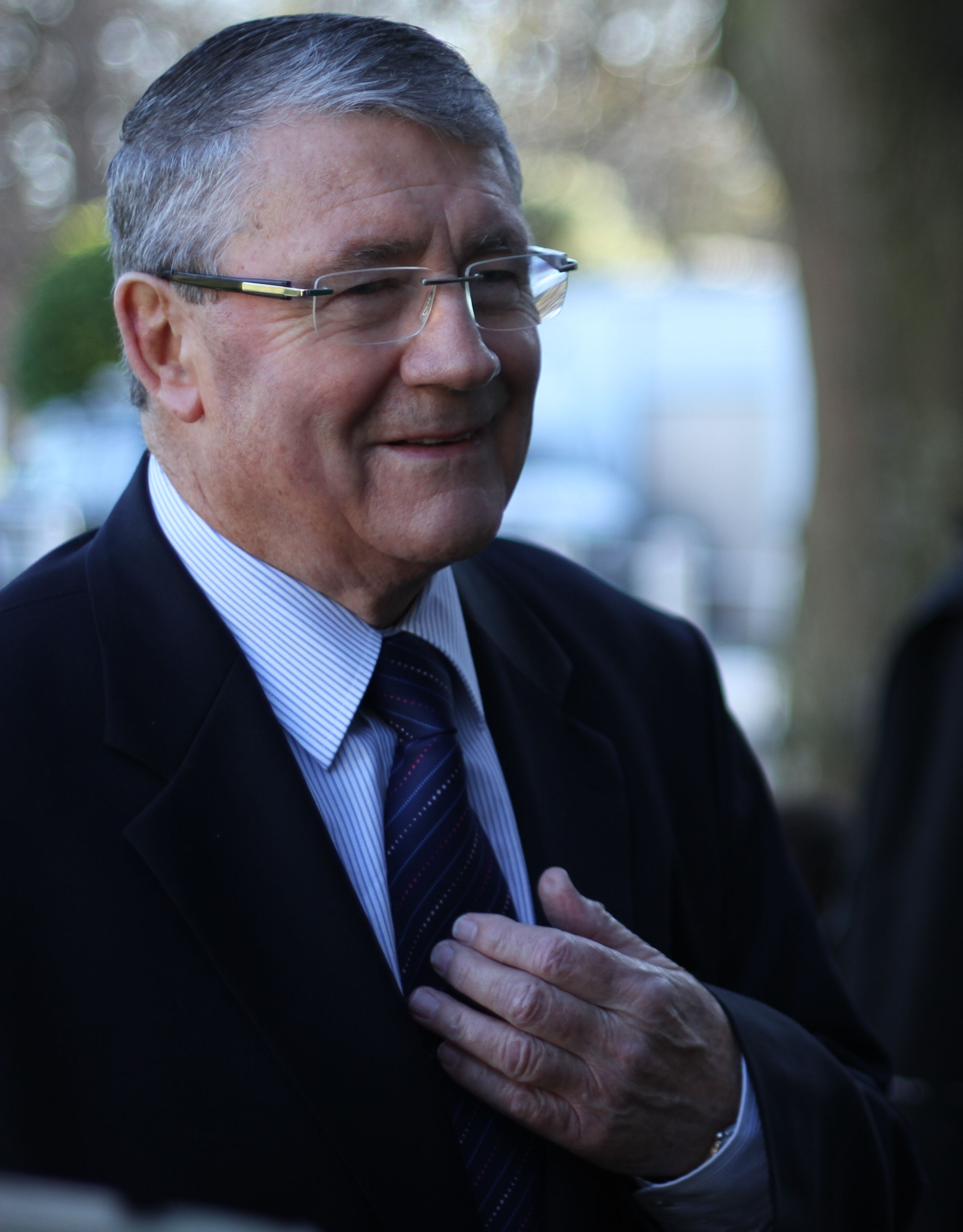

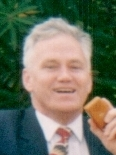

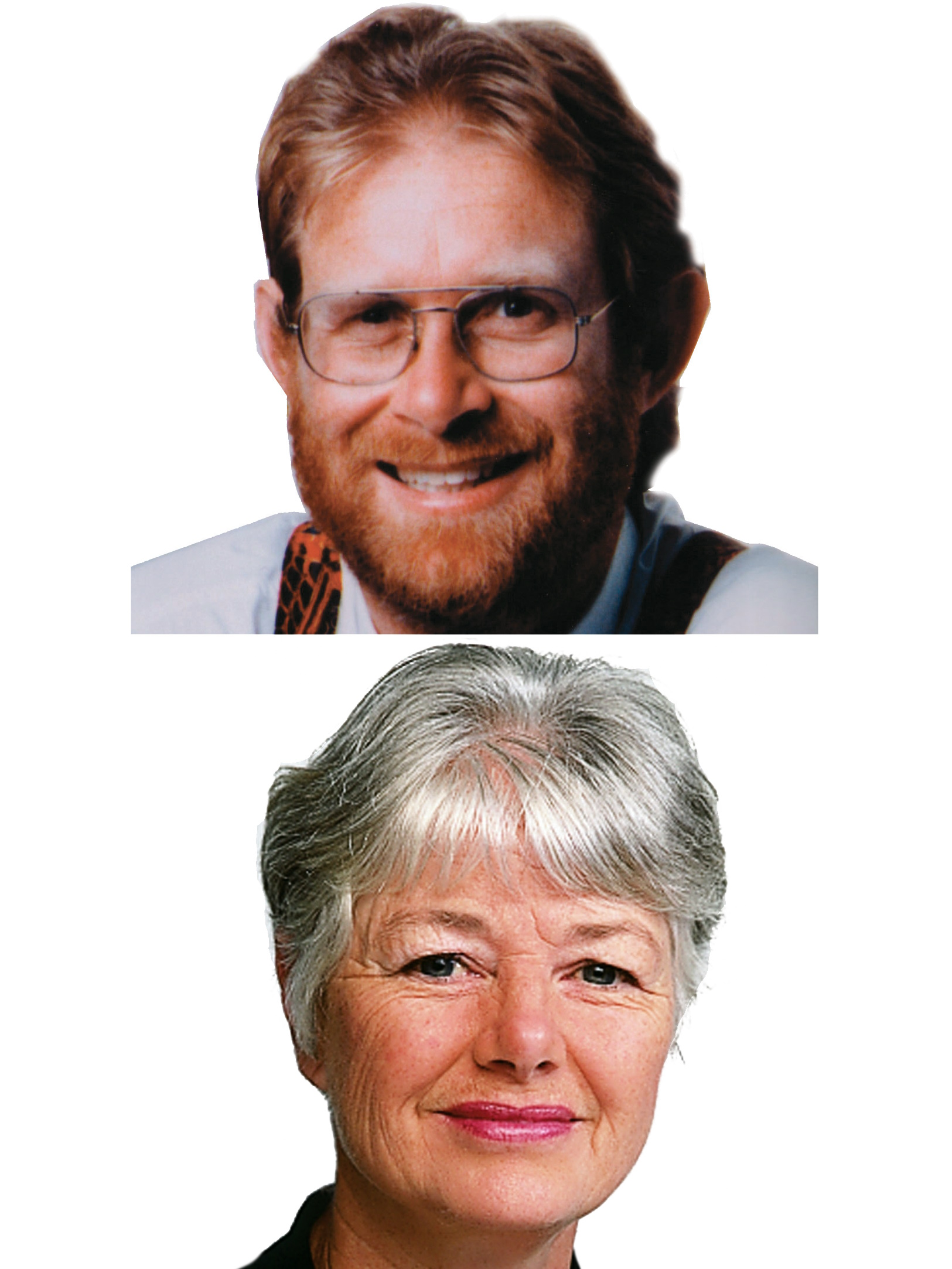

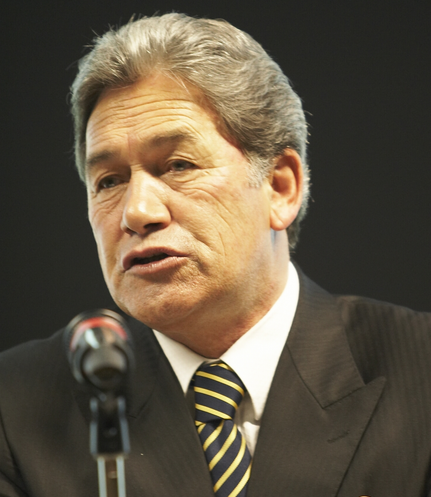

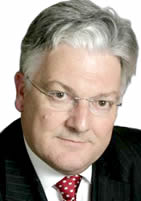
	First party	Second party	Third party
Leader	Helen Clark	Jenny Shipley	Jim Anderton
Party	Labour	National	Alliance
Leader since	1 December 1993	8 December 1997	7 May 1995
Leader's seat	Mount Albert	Rakaia	Wigram
Last election	37 seats, 28.19%	44 seats, 33.87%	13 seats, 10.10%
Seats before	37	44	9
Seats won	49	39	10
Seat change	▲12	▼5	▼3
Party vote	800,199	629,932	159,859
Percentage	38.74%	30.50%	7.74%
Swing	▲10.55 pp	▼3.37 pp	▼2.36 pp
	Fourth party	Fifth party	Sixth party
Leader	Richard Prebble	Rod Donald; Jeanette Fitzsimons	Winston Peters
Party	ACT	Green	NZ First
Leader since	24 March 1996	21 May 1995	18 July 1993
Leader's seat	List (lost Wellington Central)	List; Coromandel	Tauranga
Last election	8 seats, 6.10%	Ran as part of Alliance	17 seats, 13.35%
Seats before	8	2	9
Seats won	9	7	5
Seat change	▲1	▲7	▼12
Party vote	145,493	106,560	87,926
Percentage	7.04%	5.16%	4.26%
Swing	▲0.94 pp	new	▼9.09 pp
	Seventh party
Leader	Peter Dunne
Party	United NZ
Leader since	13 December 1993
Leader's seat	Ohariu Belmont
Last election	1 seat, 0.88%
Seats before	1
Seats won	1
Seat change	Steady
Party vote	11,065
Percentage	0.54%
Swing	▼0.34 pp
- Results by electorate, shaded by winning margin
Prime Minister and coalition before election
Jenny Shipley (National)
National—ACT—NZ First defectors (Note: Mauri Pacific—Te Tawharau—Mana Wahine)—United NZ
Subsequent Prime Minister and coalition
Helen Clark (Labour)
Labour—Alliance (C&S: Green)

The 1999 New Zealand general election was held on 27 November 1999 to determine the composition of the 46th New Zealand Parliament. The governing National Party, led by Prime Minister Jenny Shipley, was defeated, being replaced by a coalition of Helen Clark's Labour Party and the smaller Alliance. This marked an end to nine years of the Fourth National Government, and the beginning of the Fifth Labour Government which would govern for nine years in turn, until its loss to the National Party in the 2008 general election. It was the first New Zealand election where both major parties had female leaders.

== Background ==
Before the election, the National Party had an unstable hold on power. After the 1996 election National had formed a coalition with the populist New Zealand First party and its controversial leader, Winston Peters. The coalition was unpopular, as New Zealand First was seen as opposed to the National government, and had made many statements in the 1996 election campaign to that effect, such as saying that only through New Zealand First could National Party be toppled, and Peters said that he would not accept Jim Bolger as prime minister, Bill Birch as Finance Minister or Jenny Shipley in a social welfare portfolio. NZ First's support crashed, though this was also partly caused by scandals and by mid-1997, NZ First was polling at as low as 2%. National also polled badly, and Jim Bolger was replaced as prime minister with Jenny Shipley.

Gradually, however, the relationship between the two parties deteriorated, and Peters took his party out of the coalition, after Shipley sacked him from her cabinet. A number of New Zealand First MPs deserted Peters, establishing themselves as independents or as members of newly established parties. By forming agreements with these MPs, National was able to keep itself in office, but its control was often unsteady. The polls were still initially close, but without NZ First support, National's chances of forming a government were slim. Eventually, Labour Party gained a solid lead over National.

The Labour Party, which had been in Opposition since losing the 1990 election, presented a strong challenge, particularly due to its agreement with the smaller Alliance party. The two had not previously enjoyed good relations, primarily due to the presence of the NewLabour Party as one of the Alliance's key members. NewLabour had been established by Jim Anderton, a former Labour MP who quit the party in protest over the economic reforms of Roger Douglas, which were often blamed for Labour's election loss in 1990. Gradually, as the Labour Party withdrew from Rogernomics, the Alliance (led by Anderton) reduced its hostility towards Labour, but it was not until shortly before the 1999 election that a formal understanding was reached regarding a possible left-wing coalition. This agreement was deemed a necessary step towards building a credible alternative to the National Party.

This election was the first one in New Zealand's history where both main parties were led by women, being repeated again in the 2020 election.

=== MPs retiring in 1999 ===
Fifteen MPs intended to retire at the end of the 45th Parliament.

Party	Name	Electorate
ACT	Derek Quigley	(List)
ACT	Patricia Schnauer	(List)
Alliance	Pam Corkery	(List)
Independent	Neil Kirton	(List)
Independent	Peter McCardle	(List)
Mauri Pacific	Jack Elder	(List)
National	John Banks	Whangarei
National	Bill Birch	Port Waikato
National	Christine Fletcher	Epsom
National	Doug Graham	(List)
National	Peter Gresham	(List)
National	Denis Marshall	Rangitikei
National	Roger Maxwell	(List)
National	Joy Quigley	(List)
Labour	Mike Moore	Waimakariri
Labour	Larry Sutherland	Christchurch East

== Outgoing parliament ==
Affiliation	Ideology	Members	
Affiliation	Ideology	At 1996 election	At dissolution
National	Liberal conservatism	44	44
Labour	Social democracy	37	37
Alliance	Democratic socialism	13	9
Green	Environmentalism	13	2
NZ First	Populism	17	9
ACT	Classical liberalism	8	8
Mauri Pacific	Multiculturalism	–	5
Te Tawharau	Māori politics	–	1
Mana Wahine	Māori feminism	–	1
United NZ	Christian democracy	1	1
Christian Heritage	Christian democracy	–	1
Independent	–	–	2
Total		120	120

Notes

- The Greens had contested the election under the Alliance banner, but split from the Alliance in 1997, remaining in their parliamentary faction.

== The election ==
The election took place on 27 November. Less than 84.1% of the 2,509,365 people registered to vote turned out for the election. This was the lowest turnout for some time, although it would drop further in the 2002 election. A total of 679 candidates stood for electorate seats, representing 36 parties. Party lists comprised 760 candidates from 22 parties. The new government was sworn in on 10 December.

In the election 965 candidates stood, and there were 22 registered parties with party lists. Of the candidates, 482 were electorate and list, 197 were electorate only, and 286 were list only. 67% of candidates (647) were male and 33% (318) female.

== Results ==
Labour Party won 49 seats in parliament. When combined with the ten seats won by the Alliance, the coalition was two seats short of an absolute majority. It was able to form a new government with support from the Green Party, which entered parliament for the first time as an independent party (having previously been a part of the Alliance). The Green Party's entry to parliament was by a narrow margin, however – in order to gain seats, it needed to either win 5% of the party vote or win an electorate seat, neither of which the party appeared likely to do. Helen Clark openly encouraged Labour supporters in the Coromandel to give their constituency vote to Green Party co-leader Jeanette Fitzsimons and their party vote to Labour. However, when all special votes (that is, votes cast by people who were not able to attend a polling place in their electorate on the day of the election) were counted, the Greens had narrowly reached not one but both targets – Jeanette Fitzsimons won the electorate of Coromandel by 250 votes, and the party gained 5.16% of the vote.

The National Party, while not performing exceptionally poorly, failed to gain enough support to keep it in power. It won 39 seats, ten fewer than the Labour Party. ACT New Zealand, a potential coalition partner for National, gained nine seats. While this was an increase on ACT's previous election results, it was not sufficient to enable the National Party to form a government. National's former coalition partner, New Zealand First, performed poorly, with voters punishing it for the problems in the last government. The party received less than 5% of the vote, and so would have been removed from parliament had Winston Peters not retained his electorate of Tauranga, something he did by only 63 votes. None of the MPs who deserted New Zealand First were returned to parliament.

== Detailed results ==
=== Parliamentary parties ===
Summary of the 27 November 1999 election for the House of Representatives
Party	Party vote			Electorate vote			Seats			
Party	Votes	%	Change (pp)	Votes	%	Change (pp)	List	Electorate	Total	+/-
Labour	800,199	38.74	▲10.55	854,736	41.75	▲10.67	8	41	49	▲12
National	629,932	30.50	▼3.37	641,361	31.32	▼1.99	17	22	39	▼5
Alliance	159,859	7.74	▼2.36	141,322	6.90	▼4.35	9	1	10	▼3
ACT	145,493	7.04	▲0.94	92,445	4.52	▲0.77	9	0	9	▲1
Green	106,560	5.16	new	86,157	4.21	new	6	1	7	new
NZ First	87,926	4.26	▼9.09	85,737	4.19	▼9.30	4	1	5	▼12
United NZ	11,065	0.54	▼0.34	22,467	1.10	▼0.97	0	1	1	Steady
Christian Heritage	49,154	2.38	▼1.95	44,885	2.19	▼0.19	0	0	0	▼1
Christian Democrats	23,033	1.12	new	19,289	0.94	new	0	0	0	new
Legalise Cannabis	22,687	1.10	▼0.56	6,519	0.32	▲0.15	0	0	0	Steady
Libertarianz	5,949	0.29	▲0.26	—	—	▼0.03	0	0	0	Steady
Mana Māori	5,190	0.25	▲0.05	3,925	0.19	▼0.04	0	0	0	Steady
Mauri Pacific	4,008	0.19	new	9,321	0.46	new	0	0	0	new
Animals First	3,244	0.17	▼0.01	—	—	—	0	0	0	Steady
McGillicuddy Serious	3,191	0.15	▼0.14	3,633	0.18	▼0.32	0	0	0	Steady
South Island	2,912	0.14	new	2,408	0.12	new	0	0	0	new
Natural Law	1,712	0.08	▼0.07	2,101	0.10	▼0.16	0	0	0	Steady
One NZ	1,311	0.06	new	267	0.01	new	0	0	0	new
NMP	936	0.05	new	688	0.03	new	0	0	0	new
Freedom Movement	454	0.02	new	762	0.04	new	0	0	0	new
People's Choice	387	0.02	new	154	0.01	new	0	0	0	new
Republican	292	0.01	▲0.01	231	0.01	Steady	0	0	0	Steady
Unregistered parties	—	—	—	2,354	0.11	▲0.04	0	0	0	Steady
Independent	—	—	—	23,004	1.12	▲0.08	0	0	0	Steady
Valid votes	2,065,494	97.10	▲0.04	2,047,473	96.25	▼0.31				
Informal votes	19,887	0.93	▲0.55	37,908	1.78	▲0.90				
Disallowed votes	41,884	1.97	▼0.59	41,884	1.97	▼0.59				
Total	2,127,265	100		2,127,265	100		53	67	120	
Eligible voters and Turnout	2,509,365	84.77	▼3.51	2,509,365	84.77	▼3.51				

In addition to the registered parties listed above, some groups participated in the election without submitting party lists. Many of these were unregistered parties, lacking the necessary membership numbers for submitting a party list. There were, however, three registered ones that did not, for whatever reason, submit a party list. In total, 14 parties nominated electorate candidates only. By number of votes received, the most significant parties to do this were Te Tawharau (registered), Mana Wahine Te Ira Tangata (registered), the Equal Rights Party (unregistered), the Piri Wiri Tua Movement (unregistered), and the Asia Pacific United Party (registered). None of these parties were successful. There were also 36 independent candidates, also unsuccessful. The Mauri Pacific Party, established by a group of defectors from New Zealand First, failed to place even second in the electorates they held. Te Tawharau, which held a seat in parliament thanks to another New Zealand First defector, failed to retain its seat.

=== Votes summary ===
Constituency Vote
Labour	41.75%
National	31.92%
Alliance	6.90%
ACT	4.52%
Green	4.21%
NZ First	4.19%
Christian Heritage	2.19%
United NZ	1.10%
Others	3.22%

Party Vote
Labour	38.74%
National	30.50%
Alliance	7.74%
ACT	7.04%
Green	5.16%
NZ First	4.26%
Christian Heritage	2.38%
Future NZ	1.12%
Legalise Cannabis	1.10%
United NZ	0.54%
Others	1.43%

Parliament seats
Labour	40.83%
National	32.50%
Alliance	8.33%
ACT	7.50%
Green	5.83%
NZ First	4.17%
United NZ	0.83%

=== Electorate results ===
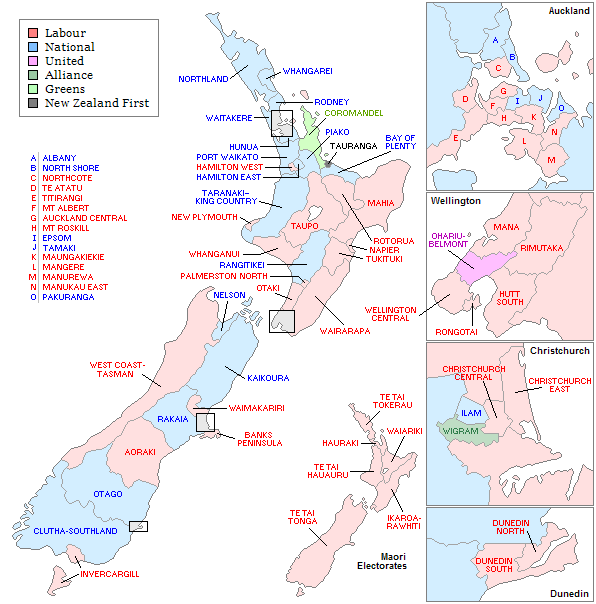
Party affiliation of winning electorate candidates.

Of the 67 electorates in the 1999 election, a majority (41) were won by the opposition Labour Party. Included in Labour's total are the Maori seats, which it managed to regain after losing them to New Zealand First in the previous election. The governing National Party won 22 electorate seats, slightly less than a third of the total.

Four minor parties managed to win electorate seats. This proved important for some – neither New Zealand First nor United would have entered parliament if not for Winston Peters and Peter Dunne retaining their seats. Jim Anderton also retained his seat. The Greens won their first electorate seat when Jeanette Fitzsimons took Coromandel, although since the Greens crossed the 5% threshold, this was of less importance than originally thought. The Greens were not to repeat an electorate win until the 2020 election, with Chloë Swarbrick's plurality in Auckland Central.

The table below shows the results of the 1999 general election:

Key

National	Labour	Alliance	Green	ACT	United NZ
NZ First	Legalise Cannabis	Mauri Pacific	Christian Democrats	Te Tawharau	Independent

Electorate results of the 1999 New Zealand general election
Electorate	Incumbent	Winner	Majority	Runner up	Third place
General electorates
Albany	Murray McCully		4,948	Hamish McCracken	Heather Ann McConachy
Aoraki	Jim Sutton		7,139	Wayne F Marriott	Lynley Simmons
Auckland Central	Judith Tizard		5,285	Martin Poulsen	Sandra Lee
Banks Peninsula	David Carter	Ruth Dyson	1,455	David Carter	Maevis Watson
Bay of Plenty	Tony Ryall		7,102	Terry Hughes	Peter Brown
Christchurch Central	Tim Barnett		9,404	John Stringer	Liz Gordon
Christchurch East	Larry Sutherland	Lianne Dalziel	11,162	John Knox	Paul Piesse
Clutha-Southland	Bill English		6,401	Lesley Soper	Dave Mackie
Coromandel	Murray McLean	Jeanette Fitzsimons	250	Murray McLean	Margaret Hawkeswood
Dunedin North	Pete Hodgson		12,695	Katherine Rich	Quentin Findlay
Dunedin South	Michael Cullen	David Benson-Pope	10,608	Russel Keast	Mark Ryan
East Coast	New electorate	Janet Mackey	3,845	Matthew Parkinson	Gavin MacLean
Epsom	Christine Fletcher	Richard Worth	1,908	Rodney Hide	David Jacobs
Hamilton East	Tony Steel		692	Dianne Yates	Peter Jamieson
Hamilton West	Bob Simcock	Martin Gallagher	1,629	Bob Simcock	Dave Macpherson
Hunua	Warren Kyd		5,195	Paul Schofield	Janice Graham
Hutt South	Trevor Mallard		8,885	Clare Radomske	Christopher Milne
Ilam	Gerry Brownlee		6,792	Alison Wilkie	Lois Griffiths
Invercargill	Mark Peck		7,990	Eric Roy	Stephnie de Ruyter
Kaikoura	Doug Kidd	Lynda Scott	1,486	Brian McNamara	Ian Ewen-Street
Karapiro	John Luxton	Lindsay Tisch	5,216	Paul Cronin	John Pemberton
Mana	Graham Kelly		5,475	Mark Thomas	Moira Ann Lawler
Māngere	Taito Phillip Field		13,047	Sylvia Taylor	Finau Kolo
Manukau East	Ross Robertson		7,086	Ken Yee	Charles Lowndes
Manurewa	George Hawkins		13,062	Enosa Auva'a	Toia Lucas
Maungakiekie	Belinda Vernon	Mark Gosche	2,512	Belinda Vernon	Matt Robson
Mount Albert	New electorate	Helen Clark	13,108	Noelene Buckland	Jill Ovens
Mount Roskill	New electorate	Phil Goff	9,707	Phil Raffills	Sarah Martin
Napier	Geoff Braybrooke		11,863	Anne Tolley	Robin Gwynn
Nelson	Nick Smith		4,521	Simon Fraser	Mary Ellen O'Connor
New Plymouth	Harry Duynhoven		15,092	Len Jury	Tom Smithers
North Shore	Wayne Mapp		7,048	Helen Duncan	Michael Pinkney
Northcote	Ian Revell	Ann Hartley	278	Ian Revell	Grant Gillon
Northland	John Carter		5,454	Les Robertson	Ian Walker
Ohariu-Belmont	Peter Dunne		12,557	Derek Best	Kathryn Asare
Otago	Gavan Herlihy		2,367	Val Dearman	Bill Holvey
Otaki	Judy Keall		7,250	Roger Sowry	Russell Franklin
Pakuranga	Maurice Williamson		5,314	Patrick Hine	Dick Quax
Palmerston North	Steve Maharey		13,153	George Halligan	John Gerard Hehir
Port Waikato	Bill Birch	Paul Hutchison	13,153	Trish Ryan	David Fowler
Rakaia	Jenny Shipley		10,602	Diane Schurgers	Annabel Taylor
Rangitikei	Denis Marshall	Simon Power	289	Craig Walsham	Dion Martin
Rimutaka	Paul Swain		8,374	Stuart Blair Roddick	Brendan Tracey
Rodney	Lockwood Smith		6,905	Mark Domney	Jill Jeffs
Rongotai	Annette King		12,928	Stuart Boag	Richard Wernham
Rotorua	Max Bradford	Steve Chadwick	4,978	Max Bradford	Lynne Dempsey
Tamaki	Clem Simich		4,911	Lynne Pillay	Alex Swney
Taranaki-King Country	Shane Ardern		6,510	John Young	Kevin Campbell
Taupo	Mark Burton		3,578	David Steele	Nick Fisher
Tauranga	Winston Peters		63	Katherine O'Regan	Margaret Wilson
Te Atatu	New electorate	Chris Carter	9,262	Vanessa Neeson	Laila Harré
Titirangi	New electorate	David Cunliffe	5,800	Marie Hasler	Stephen Abel
Tukituki	Rick Barker		8,646	Larry White	John Ormond
Waimakariri	Mike Moore	Clayton Cosgrove	1,141	Gideon Couper	John Wright
Wairarapa	Wyatt Creech	Georgina Beyer	3,033	Paul Henry	Cathy Casey
Waitakere	Marie Hasler	Brian Neeson	4,056	Jonathan Hunt	David Clendon
Wellington Central	Richard Prebble	Marian Hobbs	1,482	Richard Prebble	Michael Appleby
West Coast-Tasman	Damien O'Connor		7,378	Rod O'Beirne	Pat O'Dea
Whanganui	Jill Pettis		3,155	Chester Borrows	Mark Middleton
Whangarei	John Banks	Phil Heatley	1,934	Denise Jelicich	Brian Donnelly
Wigram	Jim Anderton		9,885	Angus McKay	Mike Mora
Māori electorates
Hauraki Maori	New electorate	John Tamihere	7,238	Josie Anderson	Willie Jackson
Ikaroa-Rāwhiti	New electorate	Parekura Horomia	695	Derek Fox	Bill Gudgeon
Te Tai Hauāuru	Tuku Morgan	Nanaia Mahuta	6,233	Lorraine Anderson	Tuku Morgan
Te Tai Tokerau	Tau Henare	Dover Samuels	5,692	Anaru George	Tau Henare
Te Tai Tonga	Tu Wyllie	Mahara Okeroa	4,522	Tu Wyllie	Vern Winitana
Waiariki	New electorate	Mita Ririnui	4,369	Tuariki Delamere	Arapeta Tahana

=== List results ===
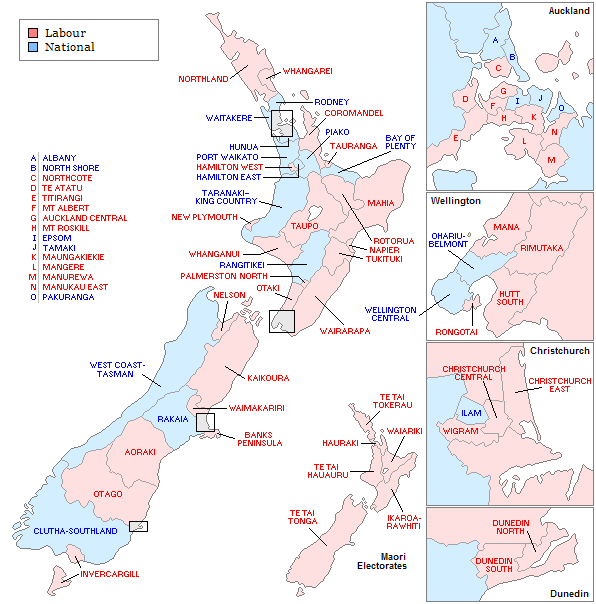
Highest polling party in each electorate.

MPs returned via party lists, and unsuccessful candidates, were as follows:

Labour	Michael Cullen; Jonathan Hunt; Margaret Wilson; Tariana Turia; Dianne Yates; Helen Duncan; Joe Hawke; Luamanuvao Winnie Laban
Labour	Unsuccessful: Lynne Pillay, John Blincoe, George Eru, Lili Tuioti, Ashraf Choudhary, Brenda Lowe-Johnson, Lesley Soper, Gordon Duncan, Denise Jelicich, Warren Lindberg, Derek Best, Josie Karanga, Tuipola Eva Charlton, Terry Hughes, Lindsay Rea, Glen Cameron, Kenneth Barclay, Margaret Hawkeswood, Tapihana Shelford, Hamish McCracken, Val Dearman, David Shearer, Lynette Stutz, Max Purnell, Yani Johanson
National	Wyatt Creech; Don McKinnon^{2} Georgina te Heuheu; Roger Sowry; Belinda Vernon; Pansy Wong; Simon Upton^{2} John Luxton; Max Bradford; Doug Kidd; Annabel Young; Eric Roy; Anne Tolley; David Carter; Bob Simcock; Katherine Rich; Marie Hasler
National	Unsuccessful: Arthur Anae^{1}, Alec Neill^{1}, Katherine O'Regan, Mark Thomas, Phil Raffills, Kerry Prendergast, Martin Poulson, David Steele, Dale Stephens, Angus McKay, Paul Henry, Chester Borrows, George Ngatai, Enosa Auva'a, Bret Bestic, Rod O'Beirne, Wayne Marriott, Stephen Rainbow, Tim Macindoe, George Kahi, Larry White, Ken Yee, Matthew Parkinson, Dawn Honeybun, George Halligan, Grant McCallum, Peggy Burrows, Toni Millar, Noelene Buckland, Stuart Boag
Alliance	Sandra Lee; Matt Robson; John Wright; Phillida Bunkle; Laila Harré; Grant Gillon; Liz Gordon; Willie Jackson; Kevin Campbell
Alliance	Unsuccessful: Mark Ryan, Heather Ann McConachy, Des Ratima, Dave Macpherson, Gerard Hehir, Moira Ann Lawler, Finau Kolo, Trevor Lance Barnard, Tricia Cutforth, Tekarehana Wicks, Robin Gwynn, Stephnie de Ruyter, Vernon Tile, Vern Winitana, Sarah Martin, Brendan Tracey, Cathy Casey, Jill Ovens, Deborah Frederikse, Tony Bird, Rebecca Matthews, Mary Ellen O'Connor, Gavin Maclean, Dion Martin, Evana Belich, Michael Treen, John Pemberton, Peter Jamieson, David Wilson, Donna Pokere-Phillips, Harry Alchin-Smith, Bonnie Johnstone, Janice Graham, Joseph Te Pare, Anna Sutherland, Lois Griffiths, Quentin Findlay, Peter Conrad Romanovsky, Gordon Parr, Lynley Simmons, Wayne Morris, Maevis Watson, Lindsay Mehrtens, John Neill, Bruce Bennett Holm, Pirihira Kaio, Paul Piesse, Bill Mockridge, Patrick Rooney
ACT	Richard Prebble; Ken Shirley; Stephen Franks; Donna Awatere Huata; Rodney Hide; Owen Jennings; Muriel Newman; Penny Webster; Gerry Eckhoff
ACT	Unsuccessful: Heather Roy, Dick Quax, Kathryn Asare, Max Whitehead, Andrew Davies, Hilary Calvert, Alex Wong, Nigel Mattison, Bruce Howat, Mike Steeneveld, Coral Wong, John Ormond, Charles Lowndes, Christopher Milne, Angus Ogilvie, Michael Coote, Brett Ambler, Vijaya Charan, Katharine Sillars, Matt McInnes, Lech Beltowski, Alex Swney, Ian Carline, Moira Irving, Daniel King, Richard Cox, John Thompson, Paul King, Reg Turner, Graham Hewett, John Morrison, Malcolm Spark, Glen Cowie, Alan Beecham, Dean Richardson, Alan Wood, Willie Martin, Ian Swan, Andrew Power, Lynne Cook, Lynley McKerrow, Gavin Denby, Barbara Steinijans, Ria Gray-Lock, Morris Hey, Jean Thompson, Paul Booth, Trevor West, Men Chandler, John Peters, Darryl Ward, Wayne Harris, Stephen Kidby, William Tripe, Kati Unuia, Garry Mallett
Greens	Rod Donald; Ian Ewen-Street; Sue Bradford; Nándor Tánczos; Sue Kedgley; Keith Locke
Greens	Unsuccessful: Mike Ward, Janine McVeagh, Richard Davies, Judy Bischoff, Danna Glendining, Janet McVeagh, Caron Zillwood, Evan Alty, Michael Tritt, Rex Verity, Laurence Boomert, David Clendon, Brendan Hoare, Lynne Dempsey, Frankie Dean, Diana Pennel, Don Murray, Diana Mellor, Angie Denby, Stephen Abel, Craig Potton, Celia Wade-Brown, Toni Atkinson, Karen Summerhays, Jeremy Hall, Deb Harding, Ruth Gardner, Pat McNamara, Wayne Parsonson, Pid Direen, Clive Taylor, Bera MacClement, Cliff Mason, Dianne Gillard, Rich Wernham, James Baynton, Craig Carson, Jane Wells, Chris Marshall, David Rose, Robert Cawte, Olive Gallagher, Chris Hay, John Carapiet, Nick Fisher, Jim Valley, Greg Sawyer
New Zealand First	Peter Brown; Brian Donnelly; Ron Mark; Doug Woolerton
New Zealand First	Unsuccessful: Ian Walker, Suzanne Bruce, Andrew Gin, Josie Anderson, Gilbert Myles, Jonathan Mosen, Kahukore Baker, Chris Comesky, Allan Wise, Rob Harris, David Fowler, Chris Rivers, Pat O'Dea, Pita Paraone, Robyn McDonald, Bill Woods, Jenny Bloxham, Graham Adams, Dave Mackie, Bill Gudgeon, Anaru George, Robert Dixon, Gordon Stewart, Anne Martin, Brent Catchpole, Charles Crofts, Lorraine Anderson, John Ballantyne, Jerry Hohepa, Joy Brett, Dilip Rupa, Edwin Perry, Raymond Hina, Dawn Mullins, Mae Neuman
Christian Heritage	Unsuccessful: Graham Capill, Philip Sherry, Ewen McQueen, Gael Donoghue, John Bryant, Frank Grover, Rosemarie Thomas, Vic Jarvis, Tuhi Vahaakolo, Dick Holland, David Parlour, Grant Bradfield, Rosemary Francis, Barrie Paterson, Chris Salt, Helma Vermeulen, Nick Barber, Robin Corner, Mike Lloyd, Madeleine Flannagan, Max Shierlaw, McGregor Simpson, Geoff Francis, Jim Prime, Mary Paki, Mark Munroe, Derek Blight, Judith Phillips, Renton Maclachlan, Mike Ferguson, Rod Harris, David Simpkin, John Tonson, Steve Williams, Margaret Burgess, Barry Pepperell, Marin Reid, Uaita Levi, Eleanor Goodall, Richard Rangihuna, Leona Emberson-Ready, Joyce Stevens, Ken Moore, Ross Prichard, Tony Corbett, Ned Jack, Mark Jones, Don Moore, Gavin Hockly, Diane Taylor, Russell Zwies, Steve Panapa, Bob Davis, Tony Brebner, Mary-Anne Gladwell, John van der Zee, Ken Andrew, Murray Pirret, Jeannette Shramka, Grant Peck, Hasko Starrenberg, Victor Grubi, David Harris, John Streekstra
Future New Zealand	Unsuccessful: Anthony Walton, David Brown, Murray Smith, Geoffrey Hounsell, Grant Bowater, Kanui Hiha, Daryl Gregory, Kevin Harper, Larry Baldock, Yvonne Palmer, Robert Wheeler, Harold Smithers, David Ogden, Judy Turner, Wayne Chapman, Julie Belding, Walter McGrail, Jason Keiller, Linda Dring, Craig Hunt, Win Murray, David Perkin, Tiwha Blake, Rosemary Drake, Martyn Seddon
Legalise Cannabis	Unsuccessful: Michael Appleby, Allan Webb, Kevin O'Connell, David Moore, Jeanette Saxby, Caleb Armstrong, Paul McMullan, Brian Jensen, Mike Britnell, Daya Moy, Kerry Gooch, Evelyn Adele Shingleton, Teresa Aporo, Christine Mitchell, Daniel Hovell, Benjamin Clark, Riki Joyce
United	Unsuccessful: Mike Sheppard, Aditya Prakash Kashyap, Ram Prakash, Jim Howard, Kim Woon, Graham Butterworth, Kookie Samin, Rehana Qureshi, Colin Jackson, Steven Bright, Maata Fuimaono, Frank Owen, Gray Phillips, Bryan Mockridge, John Hubscher, Kent Clark, Youssuf Qureshi, Murray Callister, Atiqur Rahman, Pathik Vyas, Seyed Hosseni
Libertarianz	Unsuccessful: Lindsay Perigo, Richard McGrath, Deborah Coddington, Bernard Darnton, Tina White, Peter Linton, Larry Timberlake, Sally O'Brien, Julian Darby, Chris Lewis, Peter Cresswell, Paul McDonald, Anna Woolf, Joy Faulkner, Robert Winefield, Scott Alsweiler, Keith Patterson, Andrew Couper, Robert White, Andrew Bates, Michael Murphy, Mark McCombe, Nikolas Haden, Chris Robertson, Mike Webber, Richard Wiig, Russell Watkins, Helen Hughes, Derek Bull, Ken Riddle
Mana Maori	Unsuccessful: Tame Iti, Tuariki Delamere, Angeline Greensill, Richard Kake, Tunuirangi McLean, Tracey Hancy, Ken Mair, Anton Kerekere, Jesse Pene, Mereana Pitman, David Edmonds, Henare Morehu, Te Miringa Hohaia, Gareth Seymour, Himenoa Kake, Tania Rauna, Ellen Amohanga, Diane Prince, Anthony Moke, Lai Toy, Nigel Tairua, Ngahapeaparatuae Lomax, Julie Nathan, Harata Jane Paul, Tehurihanga Heihei, Rangimarie Harding, Wiremu Tairua, Tiare Para
Mauri Pacific	Unsuccessful: Tau Henare, Tuku Morgan, Peta Si'ulepa, Rana Waitai, Ann Batten, Te Orohi Paul, Atawhai Tibble, Amokura Huia Panoho, Rovina Anderson, Eric Chuah, Danny Turia, Rajesh Masters, Martin Kaipo, Helen Akhtari, Trieste Te Awe Awe, Sharon Faloon, Rayna Waitai, Fa'amatuainu Iakopo, Laura Mason, Richard Waitai, Kelly Waitai, Api Malu
Animals First	Unsuccessful: Alistar McKellow, Adrienne Hall, Susan Walker, Terri Walsh, Bettina Brown, Brenda Walker, Janice Strong, Jan Cumming, Peter Crosse, Neville Lynch
McGillicuddy Serious	Unsuccessful: Graeme Cairns, Leanne Ireland, Steve Richards, Rodney Hansen, K T Julian, Val Smith, Peter Caldwell, Greg Smith, Donna Demente, Paul Smith, Robyn West, Adrian Holroyd, Johanna Sanders, Cecil G. Murgatroyd, Penny Bousfield, Grant Knowles, Heidi Borchardt, Paull Cooke, Amy Ross, Rebekah Coogan, Derek Craig, Douglas Mackie, Mark Servian, Bernard Smith, Paul Beere, Worik Turei Stanton, Metiria Stanton Turei, Phil Clayton, Megan Seawright, Timothy Owens, Antony Deaker, Colin Howie, Adrienne Carthew, Jonat Wharton, Paula Hudson, Helen Thornton, Amy MacDonald, David McGregor, Fiona Jack, Michael-Garnet Grimmett, Kerry Hoole, Toni-Ann Alsop, D J Howard, John Creser, Maria McMillan, Jane Hakaria, Catherine Wilson, Ara Nokomis, Dale Taylor, Wendy Clesse, Jeffrey Holdaway, Tricesta Engebretsen, Phillip Sandlant, Robyn Homes, Ross Edgar, Serena Moran, Emma Smith, Nikki Davis, Andrew French, David Sutcliffe, Daniel Mohr, Michael Gemmel, Samuel Cumming, Karl Hewlett
South Island	Unsuccessful: Allan McDonald, Patrick McCarrigan, Margaret McCarrigan, Miles Notman, Gerry Campbell, Joe Price, Paul Mierzejewski
Natural Law	Unsuccessful: Bryan Lee, Ian Douglas, David Lovell-Smith, Gillian Sanson, John Cleary, Graeme Lodge, Gray Tredwell, Bruce Brown, Anthony Martin, Selwyn Austin, Gail Pianta, John Hodgson, Linda Davy, Mark Watts, Paul Moreham, Raymond Cain, Anthony Katavich, John Bird, Raylene Lodge, Ian Smillie, Tim Irwin, Linda Sinden, Michael Hirst, Daniel Meares, Warwick Jones, Bruce Sowry, Wayne Shepherd, Gary Benner, Martin Jelley, Jonathan Muller, Leslie McGrath, Anthony Cornellissen, Russell Mack, Carolyn Drake, Thomas Hopwood, Andrew Sanderson, Ian McCullough, Kay Morgan, Martin Sharp, Bobbie Aubertin, Gilbert Urquhart, Mieke van Basten Batenburg, Leigh Bush, Michael Bartelmeh, Faye McLaren, Grant Bilyard, Brendan Rhodes, Anne Brigid, Roy Neumegen, Ruth Ordish-Benner, Gary Barnard, Lillian Urquhart
One New Zealand	Unsuccessful: Walter Boyd
NMP	Unsuccessful: Vivienne Berry-Evans, Peter Harrison, Pauline Hallows, Cecil Andrew da Latour, Edwina Chmielowski, Graham Mark Atkin, Llyn Renwick, Darag Stuart Rennie, Alison White, Aaziq Mumtaz, Sue Johnstom, Brett K Gifkins, Isabel Montgomery, Peter Archer, Isabel Hutchinson, Alfred James Mitchell, David Pattinson, John Sulu Tau Shepherd, Anthony Phillip Cranston
Freedom Movement	Unsuccessful: Jennifer Waitai-Rapana, Lei Graham, Kororia Ettie Rawinia Aperahama, Miiria Macushla Mako, Helen Te Uruiria Wepiha-Tai, Atareta Kapa Hills, Arahi R Hagger, Priscilla Ann Maxwell, Trevor Sorenson, Kevin Leonard Kapea, Taukiri Abraham, Te Rino Kotene Rapana, Mereana Pari, Myna Yvonne Rangiamohia Paraha-Richmond, Chrissie B Zurcher, Carol Grace Arnold, Whare Ngarare Mehana, Hone Hamiora Piripi Paki, Annette Christine Paki, Wiremu Abraham, Donna Louise Plumridge, Jaaron Turei Moore, Florence Plumridge, Whetu-Ote-Ata Aranui, Okeroa Denise Waitai, Tutere Tai, William Ernest Abraham, Mary-Anne Waitai, Te Wairangi (Lavinia) Pere, Michelle Ngauta Wroe, Bill Nathan Piriwiritua Thompson, Te Kura (Edward) Pairama, Jared Steve Abbot, Catherine Chisholm, Vanessa Tewaa Rangitakatu, Te Aira Nyman, John Haki Huia, Maraea Mere Hapi-Crowe, Kim Sonia Maxwell, Tina Mouri Johnston-Downs
Peoples Choice	Unsuccessful: Rusty Kane, Doug Wilson
Republican	Unsuccessful: Gregory H Smith, Brian Freeth, Graham Gilfillan, Jane Hotere, Sam Mendes, Rose Hotere, William Powell

Notes

1. These party list members later entered parliament in the term as other list MPs elected resigned from parliament.
2. These party list members later resigned during the parliamentary term.

=== Summary of seat changes ===
- Electoral redistributions:
  - A minor reconfiguration of electorates and their boundaries occurred between the 1996 and 1999 elections. Six seats were abolished and eight were created, giving a net gain of two electorates.
  - The seats of Mahia, New Lynn, Owairaka, Waipareira, Te Tai Rawhiti (Maori) and Te Puku O Te Whenua (Maori) ceased to exist.
  - The seats of East Coast, Mt Albert, Mt Roskill, Te Atatu, Titirangi, Hauraki (Maori), Ikaroa-Rawhiti (Maori) and Waiariki (Maori) came into being.
- Seats captured:
  - By Labour: Banks Peninsula, Hamilton West, Maungakiekie, Northcote, Rotorua and Wairarapa were captured from National. Te Tai Hauauru and Te Tai Tokerau were captured from Mauri Pacific. Wellington Central was captured from ACT. Te Tai Tonga was captured from New Zealand First.
  - By the Greens: Coromandel was captured from National.
- Seats transferred from departing MPs to new MPs:
  - Epsom, Kaikoura, Karapiro, Port Waikato, Rangitikei, Waitakere and Whangarei, all held by departing National MPs, were won by new National candidates. Two of the departing MPs remained in Parliament as list MPs, and another won a different electorate seat.
  - The seats of Mana, Dunedin South and Waimakariri, all held by departing Labour MPs, were won by new Labour candidates. One of the departing MPs remained in Parliament as a list MP.
- Labour list seats: Lost 3 (was 11, fell to 8)
  - Became electorate MPs: 7
  - Re-elected: 5
  - Newly elected: 3 (including a former electorate MP)
- National list seats: Gained 3 (was 14, rose to 17)
  - Retired: 4
  - Re-elected: 6
  - Not re-elected: 3
  - Newly elected: 11 (including 9 former electorate MPs)
- Alliance list seats: Lost 2 (was 11, fell to 9)
  - Re-elected: 9
  - (Became Green MPs: 2)
- ACT list seats: Gained 2 (was 7, rose to 9)
  - Retired: 2
  - Re-elected: 5
  - Newly elected: 4 (including a former electorate MP)
- Green list seats: Gained 6 (was 0, rose to 6)
  - (Former Alliance list MPs: 2)
  - Became electorate MP: 1
  - Re-elected: 1
  - Newly elected: 5
- New Zealand First list seats: Lost 3 (was 7, fell to 4)
  - Re-elected: 4
  - Not re-elected: 3
- Christian Heritage list seats: Lost 1 (was 1, fell to 0)
  - Not re-elected: 1
- Mauri Pacific list seats: Lost 2 (was 2, fell to 0)
  - Not re-elected: 2
- Mana Wahine list seats: Lost 1 (was 1, fell to 0)
  - Not re-elected: 1

== Post-election events ==
The result in the Tauranga electorate was an extremely close three way race. New Zealand First leader Winston Peters beat National candidate Katherine O'Regan in a close race with Labour's Margaret Wilson in third. Labour sought a judicial recount; since New Zealand First won less than five percent of the party vote they would have been ejected from Parliament if Peters lost his electorate (allowing Labour to govern solely with the Alliance and not needing the Greens). Peters criticised the recount as a waste of money. The recount resulted in Peters' majority increasing by one vote from 62 to 63.

A by-election to the Wellington City Council was caused after Eastern Ward councillor Sue Kedgley resigned her seat after she was elected a List MP for the Green Party, necessitating a by-election to fill the council vacancy. The by-election was won by Ray Ahipene-Mercer.
