= Murray McLean =

New Zealand politician (born 1949)

Murray Kaid McLean JP (born 1949) is a New Zealand politician. He was a National Party member of Parliament from 1996 to 1999 and councillor at Thames-Coromandel District Council from 2010 to 2022.

== Biography ==
New Zealand Parliament
Years	Term	Electorate	List	Party
1996–1999	45th	Coromandel	none	National

McLean was born in 1949. He was an MP from 1996 to 1999. He was elected to Parliament in the 1996 election as MP for the new seat of Coromandel.

McLean was selected as the National candidate after Robert Anderson, the incumbent National MP for the abolished Kaimai seat, withdrew due to illness. McLean remained in Parliament for only one term, being defeated by Green Party co-leader Jeanette Fitzsimons in the 1999 election by 250 votes. As he was not on National's party list, he did not remain in Parliament. He did not stand again in 2002.

He was elected to the Thames-Coromandel District Council representing the Mercury Bay ward in 2010, and was re-elected in 2013, 2016, and 2019. He did not stand in the 2022 elections. In his final term, he was deputy mayor.

New Zealand Parliament
Vacant Constituency recreated after abolition in 1993 Title last held by Graeme Lee	Member of Parliament for Coromandel; 1996–1999	Succeeded by Jeanette Fitzsimons
