= New Chums Beach =

Beach on the Coromandel Peninsula, New Zealand

Coordinates: 36°42′2″S 175°36′34″E

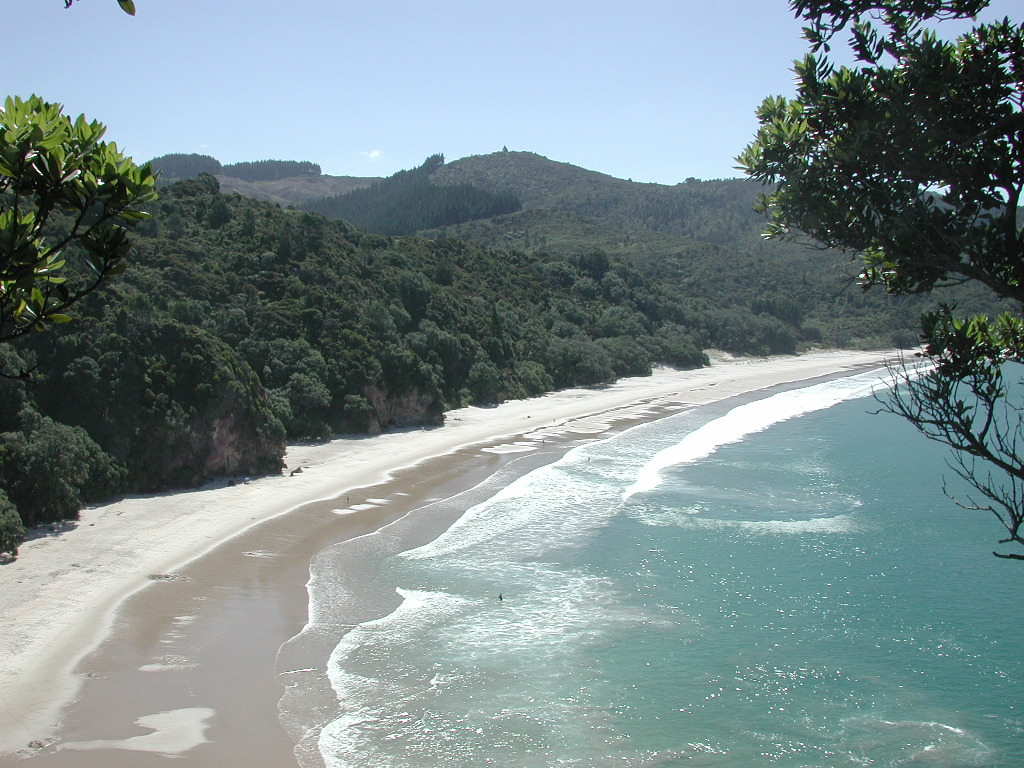
Overlooking New Chums Beach from Motuto Point

New Chums Beach is a beach in the Wainuiototo Bay on the northeast coast of the Coromandel Peninsula, New Zealand, near Whangapoua.

The hills behind the one-kilometre (0.62 mi) white-sand beach are undeveloped and covered in native bush, adding to its unspoiled appeal. In 2006, New Chums Beach was named one of the top 20 deserted beaches in the world by Britain's The Observer and highly rated by Lonely Planet and National Geographic.

In 2010, plans were drawn up to develop 20 houses, a boatshed and ramp on land owned by a Queenstown developer. These were met with considerable resistance, leading to various campaigns to save the beach and surrounding land from any development, as it is one of the last sizable undeveloped beaches in the area.

There is a track that leads to the beach in Whangapoua, that is only accessible at low tide. New Chums Beach is only accessible by the track or by boat.
