= Te Rerenga =

- Interactive map of Te Rerenga
- Coordinates: 36°45′21″S 175°36′3″E
- Country: New Zealand
- Region: Waikato
- District: Thames-Coromandel District
- Ward: Mercury Bay ward
- Community Board: Mercury Bay Community
- Electorates: Coromandel; Hauraki-Waikato (Māori)

Government
  - Council: Thames-Coromandel District Council
  - Regional council: Waikato Regional Council
  - Mayor of Thames-Coromandel: Peter Revell
  - Coromandel MP: Scott Simpson
  - Hauraki-Waikato MP: Hana-Rawhiti Maipi-Clarke

Te Rerenga is a locality on the Whangapoua Harbour, Coromandel Peninsula, New Zealand. State Highway 25 runs through it. Coromandel is 12 km to the west. Whitianga lies to the south east. The Waitekuri and Opitonui Rivers flow from the Coromandel Range in the west and south through the area to drain in the Whangapoua Harbour.

== Demographics ==
Mercury Bay North statistical area covers the northeastern Coromandel from just north of Coroglen to New Chums Beach, but excludes Whitianga. It has an area of 305.27 km^{2} (117.87 sq mi) and had an estimated population of 2,150 as of June 2025, with a population density of 7.0 people per km^{2}.

Historical population for Mercury Bay North
Year	Pop.	±% p.a.
2006	1,260	—
2013	1,317	+0.63%
2018	1,611	+4.11%
2023	2,079	+5.23%

Mercury Bay North had a population of 2,079 in the 2023 New Zealand census, an increase of 468 people (29.1%) since the 2018 census, and an increase of 762 people (57.9%) since the 2013 census. There were 1,056 males, 1,014 females and 9 people of other genders in 885 dwellings. 2.0% of people identified as LGBTIQ+. The median age was 52.8 years (compared with 38.1 years nationally). There were 315 people (15.2%) aged under 15 years, 210 (10.1%) aged 15 to 29, 966 (46.5%) aged 30 to 64, and 588 (28.3%) aged 65 or older.

People could identify as more than one ethnicity. The results were 93.8% European (Pākehā); 13.0% Māori; 1.7% Pasifika; 1.9% Asian; 0.4% Middle Eastern, Latin American and African New Zealanders (MELAA); and 3.6% other, which includes people giving their ethnicity as "New Zealander". English was spoken by 98.4%, Māori language by 2.3%, Samoan by 0.3%, and other languages by 6.5%. No language could be spoken by 1.4% (e.g. too young to talk). New Zealand Sign Language was known by 0.3%. The percentage of people born overseas was 18.3, compared with 28.8% nationally.

Religious affiliations were 23.7% Christian, 0.1% Hindu, 0.3% Islam, 0.6% Buddhist, 1.0% New Age, 0.1% Jewish, and 1.2% other religions. People who answered that they had no religion were 65.7%, and 7.4% of people did not answer the census question.

Of those at least 15 years old, 378 (21.4%) people had a bachelor's or higher degree, 1,029 (58.3%) had a post-high school certificate or diploma, and 363 (20.6%) people exclusively held high school qualifications. The median income was $28,900, compared with $41,500 nationally. 129 people (7.3%) earned over $100,000 compared to 12.1% nationally. The employment status of those at least 15 was that 657 (37.2%) people were employed full-time, 339 (19.2%) were part-time, and 39 (2.2%) were unemployed.

== Education ==
Te Rerenga School is a coeducational full primary (years 1–8) school with a roll of 118 students as of July 2025. The school celebrated its centennial in 2008.

== Climate ==
Climate data for Te Rerenga (1971–2000 normals, extremes 1962–1989)
Month	Jan	Feb	Mar	Apr	May	Jun	Jul	Aug	Sep	Oct	Nov	Dec	Year
Record high °C (°F)	30.1 (86.2)	29.3 (84.7)	28.1 (82.6)	25.6 (78.1)	23.1 (73.6)	21.9 (71.4)	20.3 (68.5)	20.0 (68.0)	24.4 (75.9)	24.8 (76.6)	27.1 (80.8)	29.2 (84.6)	30.1 (86.2)
Mean maximum °C (°F)	28.2 (82.8)	27.7 (81.9)	26.2 (79.2)	24.3 (75.7)	21.5 (70.7)	19.4 (66.9)	18.4 (65.1)	18.9 (66.0)	20.1 (68.2)	22.0 (71.6)	24.5 (76.1)	26.4 (79.5)	28.5 (83.3)
Mean daily maximum °C (°F)	24.5 (76.1)	24.5 (76.1)	23.0 (73.4)	20.6 (69.1)	18.3 (64.9)	15.9 (60.6)	15.3 (59.5)	15.9 (60.6)	17.3 (63.1)	19.0 (66.2)	20.7 (69.3)	22.8 (73.0)	19.8 (67.7)
Daily mean °C (°F)	19.4 (66.9)	19.6 (67.3)	18.0 (64.4)	15.7 (60.3)	13.4 (56.1)	11.4 (52.5)	10.7 (51.3)	11.2 (52.2)	12.8 (55.0)	14.3 (57.7)	15.9 (60.6)	17.7 (63.9)	15.0 (59.0)
Mean daily minimum °C (°F)	14.3 (57.7)	14.6 (58.3)	13.1 (55.6)	10.8 (51.4)	8.6 (47.5)	6.9 (44.4)	6.0 (42.8)	6.6 (43.9)	8.3 (46.9)	9.6 (49.3)	11.0 (51.8)	12.6 (54.7)	10.2 (50.4)
Mean minimum °C (°F)	8.6 (47.5)	8.5 (47.3)	7.0 (44.6)	4.6 (40.3)	1.5 (34.7)	−0.8 (30.6)	−1.0 (30.2)	0.1 (32.2)	1.5 (34.7)	2.8 (37.0)	4.8 (40.6)	7.0 (44.6)	−1.8 (28.8)
Record low °C (°F)	5.0 (41.0)	4.5 (40.1)	1.8 (35.2)	−0.9 (30.4)	−2.6 (27.3)	−3.3 (26.1)	−5.0 (23.0)	−4.2 (24.4)	−0.7 (30.7)	−1.2 (29.8)	0.6 (33.1)	1.9 (35.4)	−5.0 (23.0)
Average rainfall mm (inches)	115.5 (4.55)	96.4 (3.80)	183.1 (7.21)	159.4 (6.28)	150.2 (5.91)	217.0 (8.54)	180.6 (7.11)	191.6 (7.54)	172.5 (6.79)	146.7 (5.78)	102.4 (4.03)	101.7 (4.00)	1,817.1 (71.54)
Source: NIWA
