= Jeanette Fitzsimons =

New Zealand politician and environmentalist (1945–2020)

Jeanette Fitzsimons CNZM
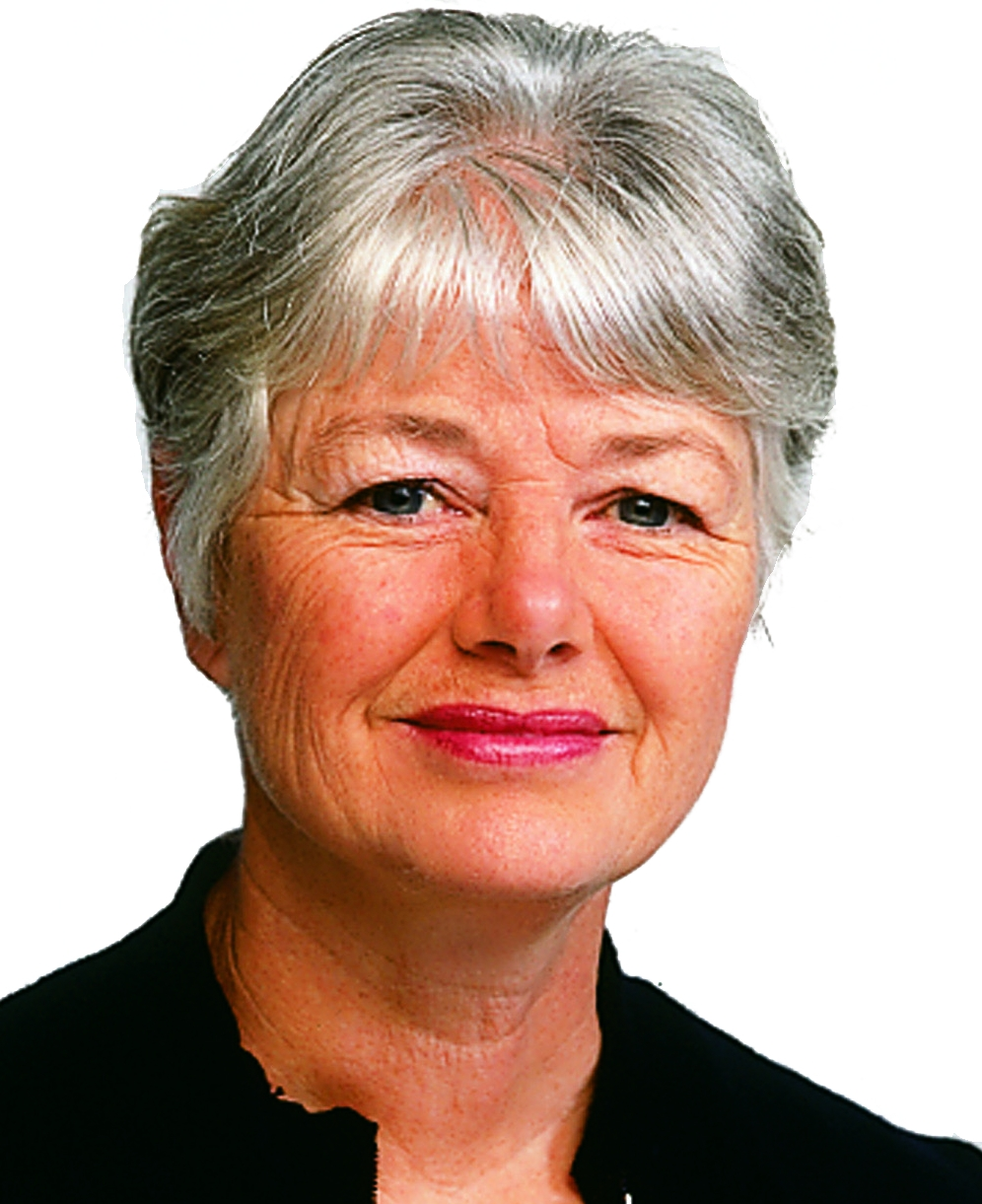

1st Co-leader of the Green Party
- In office 21 May 1995 – 30 May 2009 Co-leading with Rod Donald, then Russel Norman
- Succeeded by: Metiria Turei

Member of the New Zealand Parliament for Green Party list
- In office 27 July 2002 – 11 February 2010
- Succeeded by: Gareth Hughes (Note: Normally, list MPs do not have individual predecessors or successors, but Fitzsimons resigned during a sitting parliament and therefore was succeeded by Hughes.)

Member of the New Zealand Parliament for Coromandel
- In office 27 November 1999 – 27 July 2002
- Preceded by: Murray McLean
- Succeeded by: Sandra Goudie
- Majority: 250 (0.73%)

Member of the New Zealand Parliament for Alliance party list
- In office 12 October 1996 – 27 November 1999

Personal details
- Born: Jeanette Mary Gaston; 17 January 1945 Dunedin, New Zealand
- Died: 5 March 2020 (aged 75) Thames, New Zealand
- Party: Green Party; Alliance; Values Party
- Spouses: 1. Bevin Fitzsimons; (m. 1966; div. 1986): 2. Harry Parke (m. 1994)
- Children: 2
- Education: University of Auckland

Jeanette Mary Fitzsimons CNZM (née Gaston; 17 January 1945 – 5 March 2020) was a New Zealand politician and environmentalist. She was the co-leader of the Green Party of Aotearoa New Zealand from 1995 to 2009, and was a Member of Parliament from 1996 to 2010.

== Early life ==
Born in Dunedin on 17 January 1945, Fitzsimons was the daughter of Doris Mary Gaston (née Harrison) and John Fisher Gaston. She was raised in nearby Mosgiel, and in Waiuku, near Auckland, and was educated at Waiuku District High School from 1957 to 1959, and then Epsom Girls' Grammar School in Auckland between 1960 and 1961. She studied French and music at the University of Auckland from 1962 to 1964, graduating with a Bachelor of Arts degree, and was considered a talented violinist. She also earned a Diploma of Education.

After teaching at her old school, Epsom Girls' Grammar, in 1966 and 1967, Fitzsimons lived in Geneva, Switzerland, from 1968 to 1974, where she joined Friends of the Earth and the Environmental Defence Society. When the Values Party was formed to contest the 1972 New Zealand general election, her father sent her newspaper clippings about the party and she became interested in its environmentalist-based policies. When she returned to New Zealand in 1974, she joined the party.

From 1980 to 1992, Fitzsimons was a lecturer in environmental studies and energy planning at the University of Auckland. She was also active in environmental organisations such as the New Zealand Biological Producers' Council and the Environmental Council and worked as an environmental consultant to local authorities.

== Political career ==
Fitzsimons' first entry into politics was with the Values Party. At the 1977 local body elections she stood as a Values Party candidate for the Auckland Regional Authority in the Auckland City and Waiheke Island ward, she was unsuccessful polling second to last. She was its energy spokesperson from 1977 to 1982, and stood as a candidate in the 1978 and 1981 elections in the Remuera electorate. When the Values Party merged with a number of other groups to form the Green Party, Fitzsimons became an active member of the new organisation.

When the Green Party joined with several other left-wing parties to form the Alliance Party, Fitzsimons became co-deputy leader, a position she held from 1992 to 1999. In the 1993 election, Fitzsimons unsuccessfully contested the Hauraki electorate under the Alliance banner. In 1995, she became co-leader of the Green Party, which remained within the Alliance.

=== Member of Parliament ===
New Zealand Parliament
Years	Term	Electorate	List	Party
1996–1999	45th	List	3	Alliance
1999–2002	46th	Coromandel	1	Green
2002–2005	47th	List	1	Green
2005–2008	48th	List	1	Green
2008–2010	49th	List	1	Green

In the 1996 election, the first to be conducted under the new MMP electoral system, Fitzsimons was placed third on the Alliance party list. She also stood as the party's candidate in the Coromandel. She was unsuccessful in the Coromandel electorate, but entered Parliament on the Alliance list.

In 1998, Fitzsimons' Energy Efficiency Bill was drawn from the member's ballot. It was eventually passed into law as the Energy Efficiency and Conservation Act 2000.

The Greens contested the 1999 election as an independent party, with Fitzsimons and Rod Donald serving as co-leaders. Fitzsimons was placed first on the party's list, and once again contested the Coromandel seat. To observers, it seemed that the Greens' chances of entering parliament were dependent on Fitzsimons' performance in Coromandel; in order to receive proportional representation, the party needed to either gain five percent of the national vote or win an electorate seat, and it appeared that the former option was unlikely. Labour Leader (and Prime Minister after the election) Helen Clark encouraged Labour supporters to give their constituency vote to Fitzsimons and their party vote to Labour. When normal votes had been counted, it appeared that Fitzsimons had been defeated in Coromandel by National's Murray McLean, but when special votes were tallied, Fitzsimons had a narrow lead. This guaranteed the Green Party seats in parliament regardless of whether it crossed the five percent threshold.

In her second term, Fitzsimons promoted bills to extend New Zealand's nuclear-free zone and to reduce road traffic. Both were defeated at their second readings.

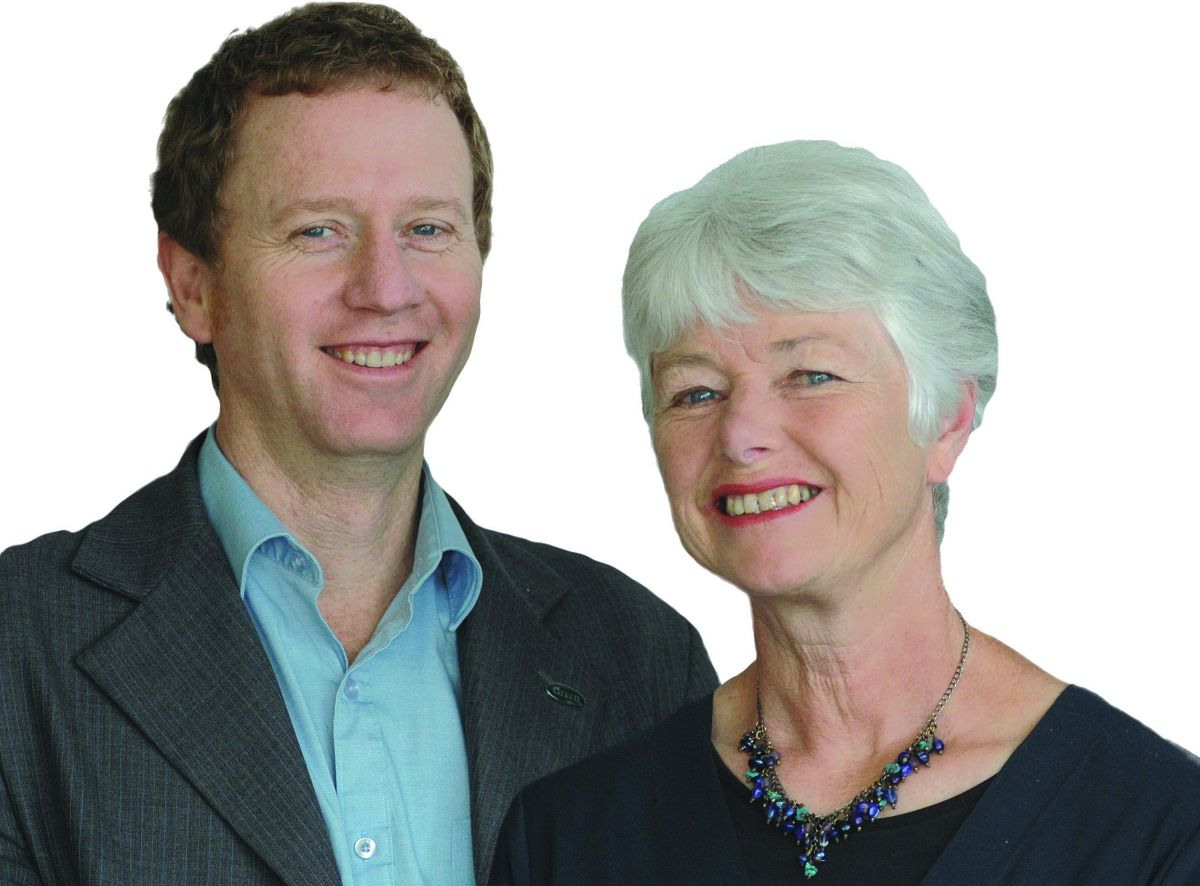
Fitzimons with her co-leader, Russel Norman, c. 2008

In the 2002 election, Fitzsimons was defeated in Coromandel. She remained in Parliament on the Green Party's list, and remained co-leader of the party until 2009.

Following the 2005 election, she became the spokeswoman for the government's solar heating promotion initiatives. This was agreed to as part of a policy package negotiated by the Green Party in exchange for its undertaking not to oppose the Labour-led Government on matters of confidence and supply until the next parliamentary elections. In the 2005 term, Fitzsimons had three member's bills drawn, addressing climate change and dog microchipping. None passed, though her Resource Management (Climate Protection) Amendment Bill did reach a second reading.

Fitzsimons was a list only candidate in the 2008 election and retained a seat in Parliament as she was ranked at number one on the party list.

In February 2009, Fitzsimons announced that she would step down as party co-leader, and she was replaced by Metiria Turei on 30 May 2009. In June 2009, her Sustainable Biofuel Bill was drawn from the member's ballot. The bill passed its first reading, but was subsequently defeated at its second reading on 4 April 2012 by a vote of 69–51, with National, New Zealand First, ACT and United Future opposing it.

Fitzsimons left Parliament on 11 February 2010, and was replaced by the next candidate on the Green Party list, Gareth Hughes, whose biography of Fitzsimons was published in 2022.

She was the Green Party spokesperson on Climate Change, Energy, Finance & Revenue, Genetic Engineering, Research, Science & Technology, Sustainable Economics, Transport and Treaty Issues (Associate Spokesperson).

=== Post-retirement life ===
Fitzsimons continued an active involvement in environmental causes following her retirement from politics. In 2013, she joined Greenpeace executive director Bunny McDiarmid on a ship which was protesting oil drilling off the coast of Raglan. In 2017, she was part of a group of protesters who chained themselves to a gate at Fonterra's Clandeboye factory in South Canterbury as a protest against the company's use of coal.

She was a patron of the Soil & Health Association, and on the advisory board of the University of Otago Centre for Sustainability.

=== Recognition ===
The New Zealand Herald named her New Zealand Politician of the Year in 2007. In October 2008, respondents to a ONE News Colmar Brunton poll regarded Fitzsimons as the most trustworthy political party leader in New Zealand. In the 2010 Queen's Birthday Honours, Fitzsimons was appointed a Companion of the New Zealand Order of Merit for public services.

== Personal life ==
Fitzsimons was married twice. She married her first husband, Bevin Fitzsimons in 1966, and they moved to Geneva, Switzerland in 1968. They lived there for six years and had two sons while in Geneva. After divorcing in 1986, she remarried, to Harry Renford Parke, in 1994. In 1991, Fitzsimons and Parke bought land in the Kauaeranga Valley east of Thames at the base of the Coromandel Peninsula and established Pakaraka Farm. The farm operates from solar power and micro-hydro power systems and sells olive oil, chestnut products, pecans and livestock.

== Death ==
On 5 March 2020, Fitzsimons suffered a fall on her farm. She died in Thames Hospital of a stroke in the evening of the same day, aged 75. Politicians from across the political spectrum including her Green colleagues and Prime Minister Jacinda Ardern paid tribute to her.

== Notes ==
New Zealand Parliament
Preceded by Murray McLean	Member of Parliament for Coromandel; 1999–2002	Succeeded by Sandra Goudie
Party political offices
New political party	Female co-leader of the Green Party; 1995–2009; Served alongside: Rod Donald, Russel Norman	Succeeded by Metiria Turei
New political party	Co-deputy leader of the Alliance; 1992–1999; Served alongside: Sandra Lee	Succeeded by Sandra Lee
