= Robyn McDonald =

New Zealand politician

Hon Robyn Kippenberger (formerly known as Robyn McDonald) is a former New Zealand politician.

== Member of Parliament ==
New Zealand Parliament
Years	Term	Electorate	List	Party
1996–1999	45th	List	14	NZ First

She was a member of parliament from 1996 to 1999, representing the New Zealand First party. She was first elected to Parliament in the 1996 election as a list MP, and was appointed as Minister of Consumer Affairs and Minister for Senior Citizens. When New Zealand First splintered, she was one of the MPs who remained with the party core.

== Later career ==
In the 1999 election, she was ranked in 20th place on the New Zealand First party list, and was not returned to Parliament. Later, McDonald was appointed to a position in Development Wainuiomata, an organisation promoting economic and population growth in the Wainuiomata area. She more recently worked as the National Chief Executive for the RNZSPCA and is known as Robyn Kippenberger.
