= Coromandel (electorate) =

- Single-member general constituency for the New Zealand House of Representatives
- Interactive map of boundaries from the 2026 election
- Formation: 1881, 1972, 1987, 1996
- Region: Waikato
- Character: Rural
- Term: 3 years

Member for Coromandel
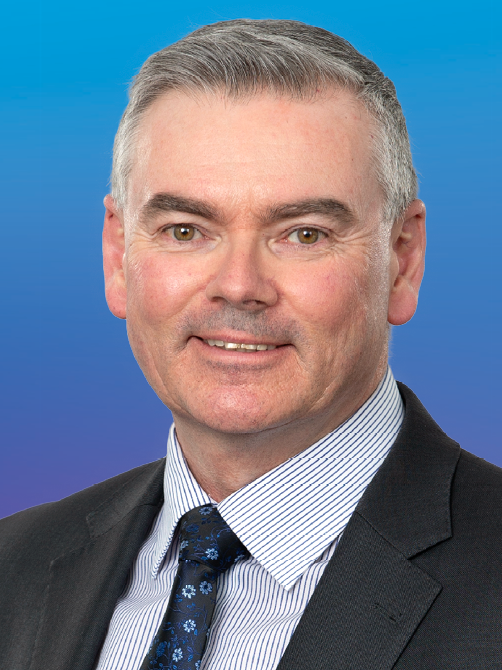
- Scott Simpson since 26 November 2011
- Party: National
- Previous MP: Sandra Goudie (National)
Party vote distribution

Coromandel is a New Zealand electoral division returning one member to the House of Representatives. It is currently represented by Scott Simpson, a member of the National Party.

== Population centres ==
Map of boundaries at the 2020 and 2023 general elections

The previous electoral redistribution was undertaken in 1875 for the 1875–1876 election. In the six years since, New Zealand's European population had increased by 65%. In the 1881 electoral redistribution, the House of Representatives increased the number of European representatives to 91 (up from 84 since the 1875–76 election). The number of Māori electorates was held at four. The House further decided that electorates should not have more than one representative, which led to 35 new electorates being formed, including Coromandel, and two electorates that had previously been abolished to be recreated. This necessitated a major disruption to existing boundaries.

Since the 1969 election, the number of electorates in the South Island was fixed at 25, with continued faster population growth in the North Island leading to an increase in the number of general electorates. There were 84 electorates for the 1969 election, and the 1972 electoral redistribution saw three additional general seats created for the North Island, bringing the total number of electorates to 87. Together with increased urbanisation in Christchurch and Nelson, the changes proved very disruptive to existing electorates. In the South Island, three electorates were abolished, and three electorates were newly created. In the North Island, five electorates were abolished, two electorates were recreated (including Coromandel), and six electorates were newly created.

The 1987 electoral redistribution took the continued population growth in the North Island into account, and two additional general electorates were created, bringing the total number of electorates to 97. In the South Island, the shift of population to Christchurch had continued. Overall, three electorates were newly created, three electorates were recreated (including Coromandel), and four electorates were abolished. All of those electorates were in the North Island. Changes in the South Island were restricted to boundary changes. These changes came into effect with the 1987 election.

The current Coromandel seat is based around the Coromandel Peninsula, and contains the towns of Coromandel, Pauanui, Thames, Whitianga, and Whangamatā. To the south of the electorate is the Hauraki District which contains the main townships of Paeroa, Waihi and Ngatea. It also extends an arm down into the Bay of Plenty, to take the towns of Katikati and Ōmokoroa, with its southern boundary on the edge of the Tauranga urban area.

Following the 2006 Census of Population and Dwellings, the Representation Commission decided to move the southern boundary of Coromandel away from Tauranga, so that Katikati will be the only large Bay of Plenty town in the seat. In exchange for this, the eastern Waikato town of Te Aroha has been transferred from the newly abolished seat of Piako. This is the largest change in Coromandel's makeup to date, and the new seat was fought for the first time at the 2008 election. In the 2014 boundary review, the electorate would extend southwards to the Hunua Ranges. In the 2020 review, the electorate would gain Ōmokoroa to relieve greater population growth in Bay of Plenty, while transferring Te Aroha to Waikato.

== History ==
The Coromandel electorate was first created in 1881 for the 8th session of the New Zealand Parliament. It existed for three terms until 1890 and was represented by Alfred Cadman.

The electorate was recreated in 1972 for the 37th session of the New Zealand Parliament. It existed for two terms until 1978 and was represented by Leo Schultz of the National Party, who had previously represented the Hauraki electorate. The Coromandel electorate was abolished again and the area again covered by the Hauraki electorate.

The electorate was once again recreated in 1987 for the 42nd session of the New Zealand Parliament. It existed for two terms until 1993 and was represented by Graeme Lee representing the National Party. The Coromandel Peninsula was afterwards covered by the Hauraki electorate, with its southern portion going into the Matakana electorate.

The electorate was again recreated in 1996 for the 45th session, which was the first term under the Mixed-member proportional representation (MMP) electoral system.

The new MMP Coromandel electorate was won by Murray McLean of the National Party in 1996. In 1999, Green party co-leader Jeanette Fitzsimons won the electorate, after then Labour Leader (and Prime Minister after the election) Helen Clark openly encouraged Labour supporters to give their constituency vote to Fitzsimons and their party vote to Labour. The Green Party believes that this was the first time in the world that a Green MP had won an electorate in the first past the post voting system, and it would be the only instance of a Green MP being elected by a New Zealand electorate until the party won Auckland Central at the 2020 election. The electorate returned to National in the 2002 election, with Sandra Goudie the representative. Goudie retired at the 2011 election.

== Members of Parliament ==
Key Independent National Green Alliance NZ First

Election	Winner
1881 election	Alfred Cadman
1884 election	Alfred Cadman
1887 election	Alfred Cadman
Electorate abolished 1890–1972
1972 election	Leo Schultz
1975 election	Leo Schultz
Electorate abolished 1978–1987; see Kaimai and Hauraki
1987 election	Graeme Lee
1990 election	Graeme Lee
Electorate abolished 1993–1996
1996 election	Murray McLean
1999 election	Jeanette Fitzsimons
2002 election	Sandra Goudie
2005 election	Sandra Goudie
2008 election	Sandra Goudie
2011 election	Scott Simpson
2014 election	Scott Simpson
2017 election	Scott Simpson
2020 election	Scott Simpson
2023 election	Scott Simpson

=== List MPs ===
Members of Parliament elected from party lists in elections where that person also unsuccessfully contested the Coromandel electorate. Unless otherwise stated, all MPs' terms began and ended at general elections.

Election	Winner
1996 election	Jeanette Fitzsimons
1996 election	Robyn McDonald
2002 election	Jeanette Fitzsimons
2005 election	Jeanette Fitzsimons
2011 election	Catherine Delahunty
2014 election	Catherine Delahunty

== Election results ==
=== 2026 election ===
The next election will be held on 7 November 2026. Candidates for Coromandel are listed at Candidates in the 2026 New Zealand general election by electorate § Coromandel. Official results will be available after 27 November 2026.

=== 2023 election ===
2023 general election: Coromandel
Notes:	Blue background denotes the winner of the electorate vote. Pink background denotes a candidate elected from their party list. Yellow background denotes an electorate win by a list member, or other incumbent. A ✓ or ✗ denotes status of any incumbent, win or lose respectively.						
Party	Candidate	Votes	%	±%	Party votes	%	±%
National	✓ Scott Simpson	24,914	53.31	+8.50	20206	42.83	+10.33
Labour	Beryl Riley	7,900	16.90	−20.50	9223	19.55	−23.66
Green	Pamela Grealey	4,942	10.57	+3.49	3672	7.78	+2.20
ACT	Joanna Verberg	2,725	5.83	+2.54	5588	11.84	+2.22
NZ First	Calleb Ansell	3,145	6.73	-	4895	10.37	+7.37
NZ Loyal	Ray Cobb	2,315	4.95	-	1580	3.34	-
Outdoors	Sarai TePou	273	0.58	−0.32	-	-	-
Opportunities					509	1.07	+0.22
Te Pāti Māori					362	0.76	+0.52
NewZeal					270	0.57	-
Legalise Cannabis					185	0.39	+0.03
Freedoms NZ					126	0.26	-
DemocracyNZ					99	0.20	-
Animal Justice					51	0.10	-
New Conservative					43	0.09	−1.53
Leighton Baker Party					32	0.06	-
Women's Rights					32	0.06	-
New Nation					19	0.04	-
Informal votes		516			284		
Total valid votes		46,730			47,176		
Turnout		47,460					
National hold	Majority	17,014	36.06	+28.63			

=== 2020 election ===
2020 general election: Coromandel
Notes:	Blue background denotes the winner of the electorate vote. Pink background denotes a candidate elected from their party list. Yellow background denotes an electorate win by a list member, or other incumbent. A ✓ or ✗ denotes status of any incumbent, win or lose respectively.						
Party	Candidate	Votes	%	±%	Party votes	%	±%
National	✓ Scott Simpson	21,218	44.81	−10.28	15,471	32.50	−18.73
Labour	Nathaniel Blomfield	17,713	37.40	+16.55	20,568	43.21	+15.42
Green	Pamela Grealey	3357	7.08	−5.02	2658	5.58	+0.27
ACT	David Olsen	1560	3.29	—	4602	9.62	+9.26
New Conservative	Michael Egleton	955	2.01	—	772	1.62	+1.46
Advance NZ	Tony Brljevich	855	1.80	—	733	1.54	—
Outdoors	Steven Hart	424	0.90	—	120	0.25	−0.87
Opportunities	Rob Hunter	418	0.88	—	401	0.85	−0.86
Not A Party	Bob Wessex	32	0.07	—			
NZ First					1429	3.00	−9.26
Legalise Cannabis					171	0.36	+0.04
Māori Party					116	0.24	+0.01
ONE					103	0.22	—
Sustainable NZ					30	0.06	—
Vision NZ					18	0.04	—
Social Credit					15	0.03	+0.01
Heartland					14	0.03	—
TEA					6	0.01	—
Informal votes		818			369		
Total valid votes		47,350			47,596		
Turnout		47,715					
National hold	Majority	3,505	7.40	−26.61			

=== 2017 election ===
2017 general election: Coromandel
Notes:	Blue background denotes the winner of the electorate vote. Pink background denotes a candidate elected from their party list. Yellow background denotes an electorate win by a list member, or other incumbent. A ✓ or ✗ denotes status of any incumbent, win or lose respectively.						
Party	Candidate	Votes	%	±%	Party votes	%	±%
National	✓ Scott Simpson	23,053	55.09	−3.64	21,786	51.23	−2.94
Labour	Nathaniel Blomfield	8,727	20.85	+9.51	11,820	27.79	+12.08
Green	Scott Summerfield	5,066	12.10	−4.31	2,259	5.31	−4.51
NZ First	Anna-Marie Andrews	4,142	9.88	+1.34	5,216	12.26	−0.23
Ban 1080	Clyde Graf	859	2.05	+0.93	125	0.29	0.00
Opportunities					728	1.71	—
ACT					174	0.41	+0.03
Legalise Cannabis					137	0.32	−0.04
Māori Party					100	0.23	−0.25
Conservative					66	0.16	−5.13
Outdoors					52	1.12	—
People's Party					30	0.07	—
United Future					13	0.03	−0.14
Mana Party					11	0.03	−0.66 (Note: 2017 Mana Party swing is relative to the votes for Internet-Mana in 2014; it shared a party list with the Internet Party in the 2014 election)
Democrats					8	0.02	−0.03
Internet					5	0.01	−0.67 (Note: 2017 Internet Party swing is relative to the votes for Internet-Mana in 2014; it shared a party list with Mana Party in the 2014 election)
Informal votes		477			205		
Total valid votes		42,324			42,735		
Turnout		42,735					
National hold	Majority	14,236	34.01	−8.28			

=== 2014 election ===
2014 general election: Coromandel
Notes:	Blue background denotes the winner of the electorate vote. Pink background denotes a candidate elected from their party list. Yellow background denotes an electorate win by a list member, or other incumbent. A ✓ or ✗ denotes status of any incumbent, win or lose respectively.						
Party	Candidate	Votes	%	±%	Party votes	%	±%
National	✓ Scott Simpson	21,934	58.72	+3.67	20,547	54.17	+2.03
Green	Catherine Delahunty	6,133	16.42	−0.36	3,724	9.82	−1.55
Labour	Korbinian Poschl	4,236	11.34	−5.94	5,960	15.71	−2.34
NZ First	Grant Ertel	3,158	8.45	+2.17	4,741	12.50	+1.47
Conservative	David Walkden	1,133	3.03	+0.50	2,004	5.28	+1.38
Ban 1080	Mike Downard	420	1.12	—	112	0.30	—
Māori Party	Hiria Pakinga	176	0.47	—	184	0.49	+0.05
ACT	David Edward Olsen	161	0.43	+0.43	142	0.37	−1.00
Internet Mana					259	0.68	+0.43 (Note: 2014 Internet Mana swing is relative to the votes for Mana in 2011; it shared a party list with Internet in the 2014 election)
Legalise Cannabis					139	0.37	−0.26
United Future					64	0.17	−0.51
Democrats					20	0.05	−0.01
Independent Coalition					17	0.04	—
Civilian					11	0.03	—
Focus					7	0.02	—
Informal votes		313			117		
Total valid votes		37,664			38,048		
National hold	Majority	15,801	42.30	+4.54			

=== 2011 election ===
2011 general election: Coromandel
Notes:	Blue background denotes the winner of the electorate vote. Pink background denotes a candidate elected from their party list. Yellow background denotes an electorate win by a list member, or other incumbent. A ✓ or ✗ denotes status of any incumbent, win or lose respectively.						
Party	Candidate	Votes	%	±%	Party votes	%	±%
National	Scott Simpson	18,571	55.05	−8.00	18,021	52.14	+0.49
Labour	Hugh Kininmonth	5,831	17.28	−5.24	6,239	18.05	−7.94
Green	Catherine Delahunty	5,660	16.18	+5.09	3,929	11.37	+3.77
NZ First	Kevin Stone	2,118	6.28	—	3,813	11.03	+4.70
Conservative	Bruce Rurehe	853	2.53	—	1,349	3.90	—
Legalise Cannabis	Jay Fitton	454	1.35	+1.35	217	0.63	+0.24
United Future	Steve Graf	195	0.58	+0.58	236	0.68	−0.06
Independent	Mapuna Turner	54	0.16	—			
ACT					473	1.37	−3.03
Māori Party					151	0.44	−0.30
Mana					87	0.25	—
Libertarianz					24	0.07	+0.03
Democrats					21	0.06	+0.02
Alliance					4	0.01	−0.07
Informal votes		843			286		
Total valid votes		33,736			34,564		
National hold	Majority	12,740	37.76	−2.76			

Electorate (as at 26 November 2011): 45,697

=== 2008 election ===
2008 general election: Coromandel
Notes:	Blue background denotes the winner of the electorate vote. Pink background denotes a candidate elected from their party list. Yellow background denotes an electorate win by a list member, or other incumbent. A ✓ or ✗ denotes status of any incumbent, win or lose respectively.						
Party	Candidate	Votes	%	±%	Party votes	%	±%
National	✓ Sandra Goudie	22,653	63.05	+10.10	18,855	51.65	+7.49
Labour	Hugh Kininmonth	8,093	22.52	−1.05	9,487	25.99	−5.72
Green	James Redwood	4,201	11.69	−3.73	2,773	7.60	+0.14
ACT	Ray Basett	624	1.74	+1.26	1,605	4.40	+3.42
Kiwi	Huey Rurehe	360	1.00	—	239	0.65	—
NZ First					2,312	6.33	−3.74
United Future					272	0.75	−1.71
Māori Party					269	0.74	+0.29
Progressive					217	0.59	−0.39
Bill and Ben					196	0.54	—
Legalise Cannabis					141	0.39	+0.10
Family Party					51	0.14	—
Alliance					29	0.08	+0.06
Democrats					16	0.04	−0.02
Libertarianz					13	0.04	−0.03
Pacific					11	0.03	—
Workers Party					11	0.03	—
RAM					4	0.01	—
RONZ					3	0.01	−0.01
Informal votes		463			204		
Total valid votes		35,931			36,504		
National hold	Majority	14,560	40.52	+11.14			

=== 2005 election ===
2005 general election: Coromandel
Notes:	Blue background denotes the winner of the electorate vote. Pink background denotes a candidate elected from their party list. Yellow background denotes an electorate win by a list member, or other incumbent. A ✓ or ✗ denotes status of any incumbent, win or lose respectively.						
Party	Candidate	Votes	%	±%	Party votes	%	±%
National	✓ Sandra Goudie	19,064	52.95	+9.39	16,062	44.16	+21.78
Labour	Max Purnell	8,486	23.57	−2.34	11,535	31.71	−2.68
Green	Jeanette Fitzsimons	5,554	15.42	−7.46	2,713	7.46	−2.02
NZ First	John Foote	1,792	4.98	—	3,661	10.07	−6.93
United Future	Lee Robertson	652	1.81	−1.49	895	2.46	−3.84
Progressive	Annette Anderson	280	0.78	−0.31	358	0.98	−0.18
ACT	Ray Bassett	172	0.48	−1.80	322	0.98	−5.26
Destiny					211	0.58	—
Māori Party					165	0.45	—
Legalise Cannabis					104	0.29	−0.12
Christian Heritage					25	0.07	−0.82
Democrats					24	0.07	—
Libertarianz					24	0.07	—
One NZ					6	0.02	−0.06
RONZ					9	0.02	—
99 MP					8	0.02	—
Family Rights					7	0.02	—
Alliance					6	0.02	−0.49
Direct Democracy					2	0.01	—
Informal votes		260			133		
Total valid votes		36,007			36,372		
National hold	Majority	10,578	29.38				

=== 2002 election ===
2002 general election:: Coromandel
Notes:	Blue background denotes the winner of the electorate vote. Pink background denotes a candidate elected from their party list. Yellow background denotes an electorate win by a list member, or other incumbent. A ✓ or ✗ denotes status of any incumbent, win or lose respectively.						
Party	Candidate	Votes	%	±%	Party votes	%	±%
National	Sandra Goudie	14,706	43.56	+4.31	7,663	22.38	−8.75
Labour	Max Purnell	8,748	25.91	+14.54	11,778	34.39	−1.49
Green	✗ Jeanette Fitzsimons	7,724	22.88	−17.10	3,232	9.48	+1.83
United Future	Lee Robertson	1,113	3.30	—	2,159	6.30	+1.88 (Note: 2002 United Future swing is compared to the 1999 results of United New Zealand and Future New Zealand, who merged in 2000)
ACT	David Olsen	771	2.28	—	2,137	6.24	−0.09
Progressive	Annette Anderson	367	1.09	—	398	1.16	—
Christian Heritage	David Parlour	329	0.97	—	306	0.89	−1.59
NZ First					5,740	17.00	+10.03
ORNZ					473	1.38	—
Alliance					175	0.51	−5.98
Legalise Cannabis					139	0.41	−0.37
One NZ					27	0.08	−0.02
Mana Māori					10	0.03	+0.01
NMP					7	0.02	−0.06
Informal votes		386			111		
Total valid votes		33,758			34,244		
National gain from Green	Majority	5,958	17.65				

=== 1999 election ===
1999 general election: Coromandel
Notes:	Blue background denotes the winner of the electorate vote. Pink background denotes a candidate elected from their party list. Yellow background denotes an electorate win by a list member, or other incumbent. A ✓ or ✗ denotes status of any incumbent, win or lose respectively.						
Party	Candidate	Votes	%	±%	Party votes	%	±%
Green	Jeanette Fitzsimons (Note: The Green Party split from the Alliance Party, who Fitzsimons had stood for in 1996)	13,682	39.98	+39.98	2,640	7.65	+7.65
National	✗ Murray McLean	13,432	39.25	+6.34	10,747	31.13	–0.77
Labour	Margaret Hawkeswood	3,892	11.37	−0.55	12,390	35.88	+14.14
NZ First	Robyn McDonald	1,237	3.61	−18.61	2,406	6.97	–13.18
Alliance	Tony Bird	1,217	3.56	−23.22	2,241	6.49	–12.19
Christian Heritage	David Parlour	760	2.22	+2.22	855	2.45	+2.45
ACT					2,187	6.33	+1.58
Christian Democrats					336	0.97	+0.97
Legalise Cannabis					268	0.78	–0.82
United NZ					156	0.45	–0.32
Libertarianz					104	0.30	+0.24
McGillicuddy Serious					59	0.17	–0.15
Animals First					39	0.11	+0.11
One NZ					34	0.10	+0.10
NMP					27	0.08	+0.08
Natural Law					11	0.03	–0.15
Mana Māori					8	0.02	+0.01
Freedom Movement					6	0.02	+0.02
Mauri Pacific					6	0.02	+0.02
South Island					3	0.01	+0.01
Republican					2	0.006	+0.006
The People's Choice					2	0.006	+0.006
Informal votes		660			353		
Total valid votes		34,880			34,880		
Green gain from National	Majority	250	0.73				

=== 1996 election ===
1996 general election: Coromandel
Notes:	Blue background denotes the winner of the electorate vote. Pink background denotes a candidate elected from their party list. Yellow background denotes an electorate win by a list member, or other incumbent. A ✓ or ✗ denotes status of any incumbent, win or lose respectively.						
Party	Candidate	Votes	%	±%	Party votes	%	±%
National	Murray McLean	12,011	33.64		11,476	31.90	
Alliance	Jeanette Fitzsimons	9,561	26.78		4,561	12.68	
NZ First	Robyn McDonald	7,932	22.22		7,251	20.15	
Labour	Margaret Hawkeswood	4,255	11.92		7,823	21.74	
ACT	Thomas Howard	833	2.33		1,710	4.75	
United NZ	Gail McIntosh	433	1.21		276	0.77	
McGillicuddy Serious	Gary Young	267	0.75		116	0.32	
Superannuitants & Youth	Vern Byrne	189	0.53		43	0.12	
Progressive Green	Ralph Dell	145	0.41		79	0.22	
Natural Law	Mimousse Hodgson	76	0.21		64	0.18	
Christian Coalition					1,877	5.22	
Legalise Cannabis					576	1.60	
Animals First					48	0.13	
Green Society					23	0.06	
Libertarianz					20	0.06	
Conservatives					14	0.04	
Advance New Zealand					5	0.01	
Asia Pacific United					5	0.01	
Ethnic Minority Party					5	0.01	
Mana Māori					5	0.01	
Te Tawharau					3	0.01	
Informal votes		394			116		
Total valid votes		35,702			35,980		
National win new seat	Majority	2,450	6.86				
