= Scott Simpson (politician) =

New Zealand politician (born 1959)

The Honourable Scott Simpson MP
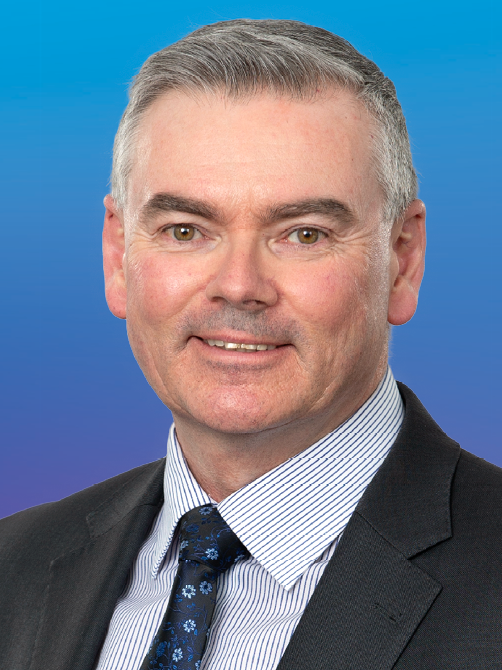
- Simpson in 2023

19th Minister for ACC
- Incumbent
- Assumed office 24 February 2025
- Prime Minister: Christopher Luxon
- Preceded by: Andrew Bayly

29th Minister of Statistics
- In office 2 May 2017 – 26 October 2017
- Prime Minister: Bill English
- Preceded by: Mark Mitchell
- Succeeded by: James Shaw
- Incumbent
- Assumed office 2 April 2026
- Prime Minister: Christopher Luxon
- Preceded by: Shane Reti

17th Minister of Commerce and Consumer Affairs
- Incumbent
- Assumed office 24 February 2025
- Prime Minister: Christopher Luxon
- Preceded by: Andrew Bayly

Deputy Leader of the House
- Incumbent
- Assumed office 2 April 2026
- Prime Minister: Christopher Luxon
- Preceded by: Louise Upston

Chief Government Whip in the House of Representatives
- In office 5 December 2023 – 4 March 2025
- Prime Minister: Christopher Luxon
- Deputy: Suze Redmayne
- Preceded by: Tangi Utikere
- Succeeded by: Stuart Smith

Member of the New Zealand Parliament for Coromandel
- Incumbent
- Assumed office 26 November 2011
- Preceded by: Sandra Goudie
- Majority: 14,596

Personal details
- Born: Scott Anthony Simpson; 4 November 1959 (age 67)
- Party: National Party
- Spouse: Desley Simpson (divorced)
- Occupation: Politician

Scott Anthony Simpson (born 4 November 1959) is a New Zealand politician and a member of the New Zealand House of Representatives. He is a member of the National Party.

Simpson is Minister for ACC and Minister of Commerce and Consumer Affairs in the Sixth National Government, and was previously the Chief Government Whip. He was formerly Minister of Statistics in the Fifth National Government from May to October 2017.

== Early life and career ==
Simpson's ancestors settled in Kūaotunu, on the Coromandel Peninsula, in the 1800s. He grew up in Auckland and was educated at the University of Auckland, graduating with a law degree.

He was chief executive of the New Zealand Make-a-Wish Foundation from 2008 to 2011, and previously a member of the National Party board of directors. He also managed a safety equipment company.

He was married to Desley Simpson, but the couple separated ca. 2004/2005. She is now married to Peter Goodfellow. The former couple has two children.

== Early political career ==
Simpson has been MP for Coromandel since 2011. Prior to his election to Parliament, Simpson held senior positions in the National Party. He was National Party Northern Regional Chair and a member of the National Party's Board of Directors in the 2010s. He stood for the National Party presidency in 2009 but lost to Peter Goodfellow. He previously stood for selection as the National Party candidate for Tamaki in 2004, but lost to Allan Peachey.

== Member of Parliament ==
New Zealand Parliament
Years	Term	Electorate	List	Party
2011–2014	50th	Coromandel	61	National
2014–2017	51st	Coromandel	45	National
2017–2020	52nd	Coromandel	26	National
2020–2023	53rd	Coromandel	10	National
2023–2026	54th	Coromandel	55	National
2026–present	55th	Coromandel	18	National

=== Fifth National Government, 2011–2017 ===
Simpson was selected as the National Party's Coromandel candidate in April 2011. He was elected at the 2011 general election with a majority of 12,740. From 2013 to 2014, Simpson was chair of the Justice and Electoral select committee.

During the 2014 New Zealand general election, Simpson was re-elected in Coromandel by a margin of 15,801, defeating the Green Party's candidate Catherine Delahunty. Simpson chaired the Local Government and Environment select committee until his appointment in May 2017 as Minister of Statistics, Associate Minister of Immigration and Associate Minister for the Environment.

=== In opposition, 2017–2023 ===
During the 2017 New Zealand general election, Simpson was re-elected in Coromandel by a margin of 14,326 votes over Labour's Nathaniel Blomfield. The National Party was not in government and Simpson served as his party's spokesperson for the environment, workplace relations and safety, and climate change.

During the 2020 New Zealand general election, Simpson retained Coromandel for a fourth term by a final margin of 3,505 votes over Labour's Nathaniel Blomfield.

=== Sixth National Government, 2023–present ===
During the 2023 New Zealand general election, Simpson retained Coromandel for a fifth term by a margin of 17,349 votes over Labour's Beryl Riley.

When National formed a government with NZ First and ACT following the 2023 election, Simpson was not appointed to a ministerial position despite having been a minister in the previous National government. Instead, he was made Senior Whip of the National Party and became Chief Government Whip in the 54th New Zealand Parliament when it opened on 5 December 2023. He was chair of the Environment committee from 23 May 2024 until 29 January 2025, replacing David MacLeod, who was removed from that role after failing to declare political donations. On 24 February 2025, Simpson was appointed as Minister for ACC and Minister of Commerce and Consumer Affairs, outside Cabinet, after Andrew Bayly resigned. He was succeeded as Senior Whip by Stuart Smith.

Following a cabinet reshuffle in early April 2026, Simpson was appointed as Minister of Statistics and Deputy Leader of the House.

In late May 2026, Simpson introduced an amendment to the Social Security Act that would allow the Ministry of Social Development to use artificial intelligence to make decisions regarding people's welfare benefits. The bill passed under parliamentary urgency into law on 30 May. While National and its coalition partners supported the bill on the grounds that it would improve efficiency under human supervision and that welfare beneficiaries would be able to review automated decision-making, the opposition Labour, Green Party of Aotearoa New Zealand parties and Te Pāti Māori opposed the bill on the grounds that it would "stigmatise" welfare beneficiaries and similar artificial intelligence technology deployed overseas had resulted in errors.

During the 2026 New Zealand general election, Simpson contested the Coromandel electorate for National. He was ranked 18th on the National Party list. On 7 November, Simpson retained Coromandel by a landslide margin of 14,392 votes.

== Views and positions ==
In the National Party caucus, Simpson is a liberal. He voted in favour of the Marriage (Definition of Marriage) Amendment Act 2013, the End of Life Choice Act 2019 and the Abortion Legislation Act 2020.

He has led the National Party's advisory group on environmental issues, the Bluegreens.

New Zealand Parliament
Preceded by Sandra Goudie	Member of Parliament for Coromandel; 2011–present	Incumbent
