= List of Green Party of Aotearoa New Zealand MPs =

The following is a list of Green Party of Aotearoa New Zealand members of Parliament. It includes all 44 Green Party members of Parliament (MPs) elected to the New Zealand House of Representatives, starting with their first representatives in 1996 (as part of the Alliance), up to the present. The Green Party has had a continuous presence in Parliament since they first entered. Members in bold served as co-leader.

There are currently 15 Green MPs, including Steve Abel, Kahurangi Carter, Marama Davidson (co-leader), Mike Davidson, Julie Anne Genter, Francisco Hernandez, Hūhana Lyndon, Ricardo Menéndez March, Tamatha Paul, Lan Pham, Chlöe Swarbrick (co-leader), Teanau Tuiono, Celia Wade-Brown, Scott Willis, and Lawrence Xu-Nan.

== List of MPs ==
Green Party of Aotearoa New Zealand Members of Parliament
Name	Portrait	First elected	Electorates	Left party / parliament	Notes
Phillida Bunkle (b. 1944)		1996	List (1996–1997)	1997	Remained an Alliance MP until 2002
**Rod Donald** (1957–2005)		1996	List (1996–2005)	2005†	Died in office
**Jeanette Fitzsimons** (1945–2020)		1996	List (1996–1999); Coromandel (1999–2002); List (2002–2010)	2010	Resigned from parliament
Sue Bradford (b. 1952)		1999	List (1999–2009)	2009	Resigned from parliament
Ian Ewen-Street (b. 1949)		1999	List (1999–2005)	2005	
Sue Kedgley (b. 1948)		1999	List (1999–2011)	2011	
Keith Locke (1944–2024)		1999	List (1999–2011)	2011	
Nándor Tánczos (b. 1966)		1999	List (1999–2008)	2008	Resigned from parliament
**Metiria Turei** (b. 1970)		2002	List (2002–2017)	2017	
Mike Ward (b. 1942)		2002	List (2002–2005)	2005	
**Russel Norman** (b. 1967)		2008	List (2008–2015)	2015	Resigned from parliament
Catherine Delahunty (b. 1953)		2008	List (2008–2017)	2017	
Kennedy Graham (b. 1946)		2008	List (2008–2017)	2017	
Kevin Hague (b. 1960)		2008	List (2008–2016)	2016	Resigned from parliament
David Clendon (b. 1955)		2009	List (2009–2017)	2017	
Gareth Hughes (b. 1981)		2010	List (2010–2020)	2020	
Steffan Browning (b. 1954)		2011	List (2011–2017)	2017	
Julie Anne Genter (b. 1979)		2011	List (2011–2023); Rongotai (2023–present)		
Jan Logie (b. 1969)		2011	List (2011–2023)	2023	
Mojo Mathers (b. 1966)		2011	List (2011–2017)	2017	
Denise Roche (b. 1970)		2011	List (2011–2017)	2017	
Eugenie Sage (b. 1963)		2011	List (2011–2023)	2023	
Holly Walker (b. 1982)		2011	List (2011–2014)	2014	
**James Shaw** (b. 1973)		2014	List (2014–2024)	2024	
**Marama Davidson** (b. 1973)		2015	List (2015–present)		
Barry Coates (b. 1956)		2016	List (2016–2017)	2017	
Golriz Ghahraman (b. 1981)		2017	List (2017–2024)	2024	Resigned from parliament
**Chlöe Swarbrick** (b. 1994)		2017	List (2017–2020); Auckland Central (2020–present)		
Teanau Tuiono (b. 1972)		2020	List (2020–present)		
Elizabeth Kerekere (b. 1965 or 1966)		2020	List (2020–2023)	2023	Resigned from the party
Ricardo Menéndez March (b. 1987 or 1988)		2020	List (2020–present)		
Steve Abel		2023	List (2023–present)		
Efeso Collins (1974–2024)		2023	List (2023–2024)	2024†	Died in office
Hūhana Lyndon (b. 1978 or 1979)		2023	List (2023–present)		
Tamatha Paul (b. 1997)		2023	Wellington Central (2023–present)		
Lan Pham (b. 1985 or 1986)		2023	List (2023–present)		
Darleen Tana		2023	List (2023–2024)	2024	Resigned from the party
Scott Willis (b. 1969 or 1970)		2023	List (2023–present)		
Kahurangi Carter (b. 1983 or 1984)		2023	List (2023–present)		
Celia Wade-Brown (b. 1956)		2024	List (2024–present)		
Lawrence Xu-Nan		2024	List (2024–present)		
Francisco Hernandez (b. 1990 or 1991)		2024	List (2024–present)		
Benjamin Doyle (b. 1991 or 1992)		2024	List (2024–2025)	2025	Resigned from parliament in 2025
Mike Davidson (b. 1976)		2025	List (2025–present)		

== Notes ==
†:Died in office

== Sources ==
- Appendices to the Journals of the House of Representatives, H33 and/or E9, various years. E9s since 1994 are available here.
