= Co-leaders of the Green Party of Aotearoa New Zealand =

Leaders of New Zealand's Green party

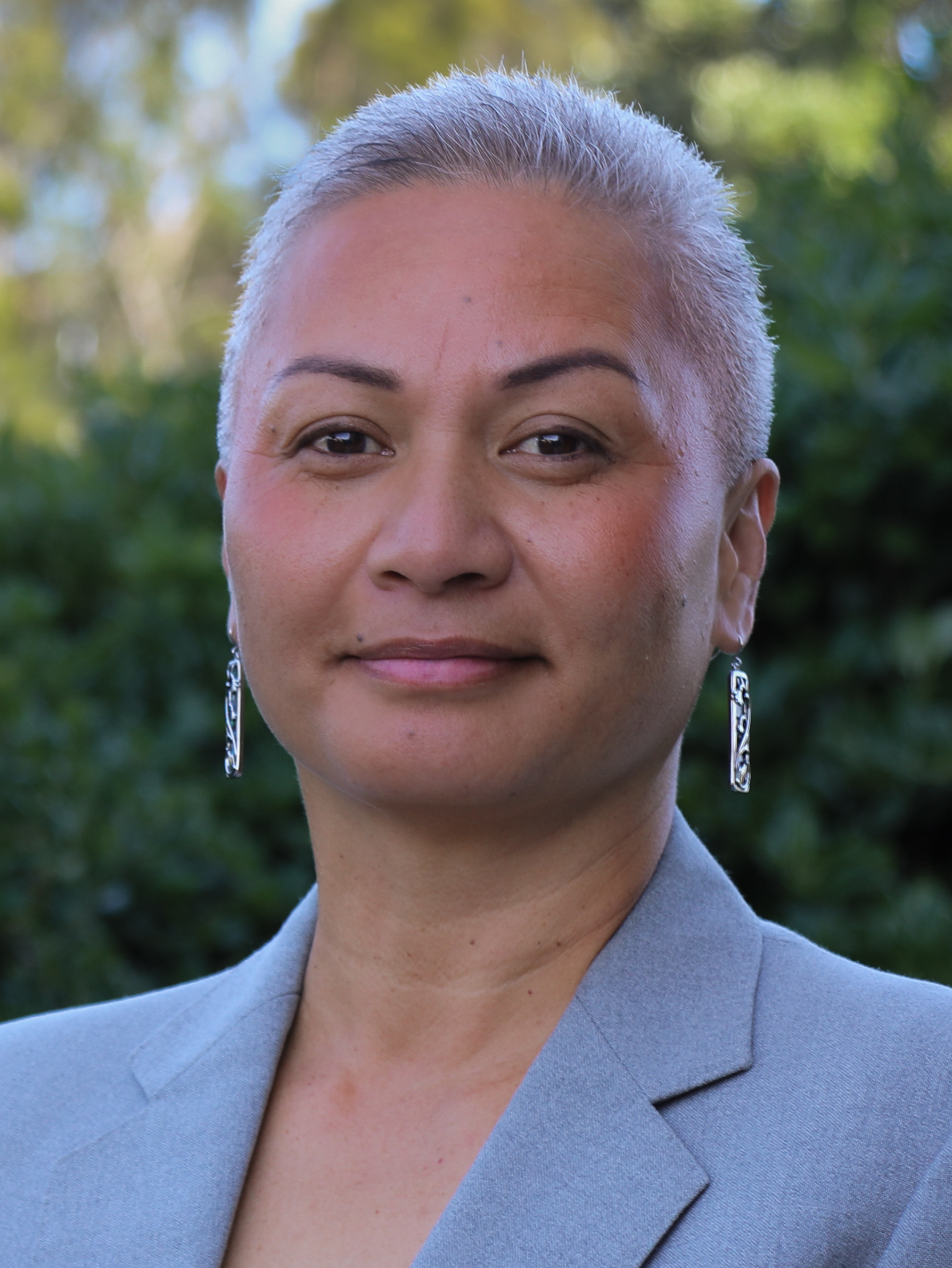
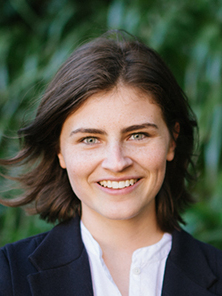
- Davidson in 2026 Swarbrick in 2017 Incumbents; Marama Davidson and Chlöe Swarbrick since 8 April 2018 and 10 March 2024
- Type: Political party office
- Formation: 21 May 1995
- First holder: Jeanette Fitzsimons; Rod Donald
- Website: https://www.greens.org.nz/

The co-leaders of the Green Party of Aotearoa New Zealand are the dual highest-ranking members of the Green Party caucus, chosen by the party membership to represent the party. The current co-leaders are Marama Davidson and Chlöe Swarbrick.

The co-leaders are elected for one year terms at Green Party annual general meetings (AGMs) or at leadership elections held to fill vacancies at other times. Incumbent co-leaders are required to be confirmed in their roles, and to meet a 75% threshold of support in a vote amongst members, at each AGM. Confirmation is usually a formality, although Russel Norman and James Shaw have defeated a challenger in this way in 2013 and 2021 respectively. In 2022, Shaw was briefly removed from the co-leadership due to only garnering 70% of the vote in the first round of voting, but was later re-elected.

Any member of the party can be a candidate for the co-leadership, even those that are not currently members of parliament, as long as they have five other party members willing to nominate them. From the creation of the roles in 1995 until May 2022, the party had a requirement that one co-leader be male and one co-leader be female. This was changed and now it is required that one co-leader be female and one co-leader be Māori. It is not required that these conditions be fulfilled by two different people.

The co-leaders comprise a quarter of the voting members on the Green Party's leadership team, known as Kaunihera (Council). The other members of the team consist of two Te Rōpū Pounamu (Note: The party's Māori membership.) kaiwhakahaere, two party co-convenors, and two policy co-convenors. The general manager of the party also sits as a non-voting member of the Kaunihera. The role of Kaunihera, as stated by the party's constitution, is to "...monitor the performance of the Party against the [party's] Charter, Te Tiriti o Waitangi, the Long-term Strategy [and] any other Party strategies supplementary to the Long-Term Strategy".

== List of co-leaders ==
Co-leaders of the Green Party of Aotearoa New Zealand
No.	Co-Leader	Portrait	Requirement (Note: The Green Party requires certain identities be represented within the co-leadership. Before May 2022 the requirements were 1 male and 1 female co-leader. After May 2022 the requirements are 1 female co-leader and 1 Māori co-leader (these conditions don't have to be met by different people).)	Electorate	List Placement (Note: List placement sources)		Term Start	Term End
1	Rod Donald (1957–2005)	Rod Donald	Gender; Male	List	10th (Alliance)	1996–1999	21 May 1995	6 November 2005†
1	Rod Donald (1957–2005)	Rod Donald	Gender; Male	List	2nd	1999–2005	21 May 1995	6 November 2005†
1	Rod Donald (1957–2005)	Donald joined the Green Party in February 1994 after being the national spokesperson for the Electoral Reform Coalition, which was supporting the implementation of mixed-member proportional voting within New Zealand. He became co-leader in 1995 and entered parliament as an Alliance MP in 1996. Donald died in 2005 due to Campylobacter jejuni food poisoning.						
1	Jeanette Fitzsimons (1945–2020)	Jeanette Fitzsimons	Gender; Female	List	3rd (Alliance)	1996–1999	21 May 1995	30 May 2009
1	Jeanette Fitzsimons (1945–2020)	Jeanette Fitzsimons	Gender; Female	Coromandel	1st	1999–2002	21 May 1995	30 May 2009
1	Jeanette Fitzsimons (1945–2020)	Jeanette Fitzsimons	Gender; Female	List	1st	2002–2010	21 May 1995	30 May 2009
1	Jeanette Fitzsimons (1945–2020)	Fitzsimons was involved in earlier environmental groups such as Friends of the Earth and the Environmental Defence Society. She joined the Values Party in the 1970s. She was a lecturer at the University of Auckland on environmental topics. The Values party would join other groups to form the Green Party, and the Green Party went on to join the Alliance, where Fitzsimons would be co-deputy leader. She became co-leader of the Green Party in 1995 and entered parliament as an Alliance MP in 1996. She won the party's first electorate when she won Coromandel in 1999.						
3	Russel Norman (b. 1967)	Russel Norman	Gender; Male	List	10th	2008	3 June 2006	30 May 2015
3	Russel Norman (b. 1967)	Russel Norman	Gender; Male	List	2nd	2008–2015	3 June 2006	30 May 2015
3	Russel Norman (b. 1967)	Norman grew up in Brisbane, Australia. He moved to New Zealand in 1997 where he was involved with the Alliance, which was also the subject of his political science PhD. He would get involved with the Green Party's Waiheke Island branch, and was executive assistant to Green MP Sue Bradford. He was national campaign manager for the party for the 2005 election. He ran for and won the co-leadership after Donald's death. Norman listed his main achievements as "forcing the Government to back down on mining on Schedule 4 conservation land, and leading a referendum against asset sales".						
4	Metiria Turei (b. 1970)	Metiria Turei	Gender; Female	List	8th	2002–2005	30 May 2009	9 August 2017
4	Metiria Turei (b. 1970)	Metiria Turei	Gender; Female	List	6th	2005–2008	30 May 2009	9 August 2017
4	Metiria Turei (b. 1970)	Metiria Turei	Gender; Female	List	4th	2008–2011	30 May 2009	9 August 2017
4	Metiria Turei (b. 1970)	Metiria Turei	Gender; Female	List	1st	2011–2017	30 May 2009	9 August 2017
4	Metiria Turei (b. 1970)	Turei had studied law at the University of Auckland and worked as a lawyer at Simpson Grierson prior to being elected from the Green Party list in 2002. She had previously stood in 1993 and 1999 for the McGillicuddy Serious Party and in 1996 for the Aotearoa Legalise Cannabis Party. In 2009 she was elected to be the new co-leader to replace Fitzsimons. Turei faced a scandal during the 2017 election when she admitted to benefit fraud; in the 1990s, she had withheld information from the Ministry of Social Development regarding receiving rent from flatmates. She later also admitted to electoral fraud; she had registered at a different address than the one she lived in at the time in order to vote for a friend. Turei resigned from the co-leadership before election day.						
5	James Shaw (b. 1973)	James Shaw	Gender; Male, Any; Ethnicity; Any (Pākehā)	List	12th	2014–2017	30 May 2015	10 March 2024
5	James Shaw (b. 1973)	James Shaw	Gender; Male, Any; Ethnicity; Any (Pākehā)	List	1st	2017–2020	30 May 2015	10 March 2024
5	James Shaw (b. 1973)	James Shaw	Gender; Male, Any; Ethnicity; Any (Pākehā)	List	2nd	2020–2024	30 May 2015	10 March 2024
5	James Shaw (b. 1973)	Shaw came from a corporate background, having worked in the consulting division of PwC and as a consultant at HSBC and the Akina foundation. Shaw has been described as representing the more environmentally focused, non-left side of the party. Shaw entered parliament in 2014, and when Norman resigned in 2015, Shaw put his name forward for, and won, the co-leadership. Shaw faced the 2017 election as the sole co-leader after Turei resigned following scandal. Following the election, Shaw was amongst the first Green Party Ministers, being appointed Minister of Statistics and Minister for Climate Change. The passing of the Climate Change Response (Zero Carbon) Amendment Act is regarded as Shaw's biggest achievement. He resigned following the 2023 election.						
6	Marama Davidson (b. 1973)	Marama Davidson	Gender; Female; Ethnicity; Māori	List	15th	2015–2017	8 April 2018	incumbent
6	Marama Davidson (b. 1973)	Marama Davidson	Gender; Female; Ethnicity; Māori	List	2nd	2017–2020	8 April 2018	incumbent
6	Marama Davidson (b. 1973)	Marama Davidson	Gender; Female; Ethnicity; Māori	List	1st	2020–present	8 April 2018	incumbent
6	Marama Davidson (b. 1973)	Davidson worked for the Human Rights Commission from 2003 to 2012. She was ranked 15th on the Green list at the 2014 election and entered parliament after Norman resigned in 2015. Davidson was elected co-leader to replace Turei in 2018 after the 2017 election. Following the 2020 election, Davidson was appointed Minister for the Prevention of Family and Sexual Violence and also became Associate Minister of Housing.						
7	Chlöe Swarbrick (b. 1994)	Chlöe Swarbrick	Gender; Any (Female); Ethnicity; Any (Pākehā)	List	7th	2017–2020	10 March 2024	incumbent
7	Chlöe Swarbrick (b. 1994)	Chlöe Swarbrick	Gender; Any (Female); Ethnicity; Any (Pākehā)	Auckland Central	3rd	2020–present	10 March 2024	incumbent
7	Chlöe Swarbrick (b. 1994)	Swarbrick ran a high-profile but ultimately unsuccessful campaign in the 2016 Auckland mayoral election. In 2017, she joined the party and was elected to parliament as a list MP. Since entering parliament, she has been the party's spokesperson on drug reform. In the 2020 election, she successfully contested the race for Auckland Central. She maintained the seat in the 2023 election. In 2024, she succeeded Shaw as co-leader, as allowed by the 2022 co-leader requirement rule changes.						

== See also ==
- Leader of the New Zealand Labour Party
- Leader of the New Zealand National Party
- Co-leaders of Te Pāti Māori
- Leader of ACT New Zealand
- Green politics
- Leaders of the Australian Greens
