= 2006 Green Party of Aotearoa New Zealand co-leadership election =

- 3 June 2006
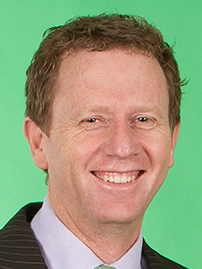

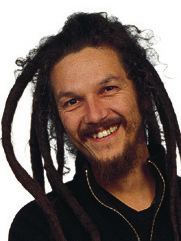

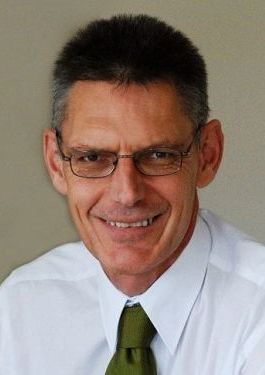

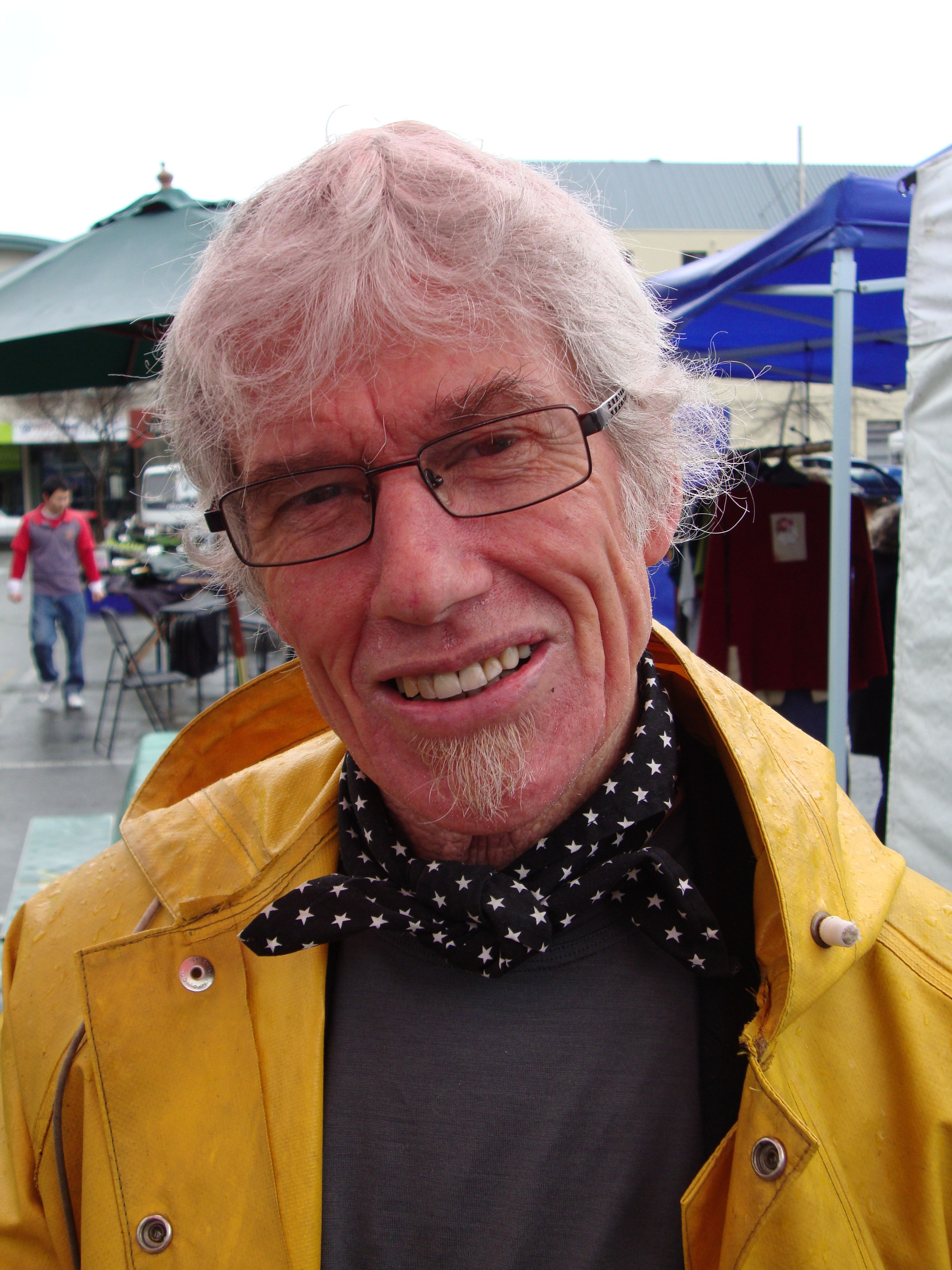
Candidate	Russel Norman	Nándor Tánczos
Popular vote	Elected	Eliminated
Candidate	David Clendon	Mike Ward
Popular vote	Eliminated	Eliminated
Co-leader before election
Vacant
Co-leader after election
Russel Norman

The 2006 Green Party of Aotearoa New Zealand co-leadership election was held to elect a Green Party co-leader following the death of Rod Donald.

The election was won by the party's 2005 election campaign manager Russel Norman.

== Background ==
Male co-leader Rod Donald died on 6 November 2005, the day before his scheduled swearing-in for his fourth term in Parliament, of myocarditis. Donald was replaced as a list MP by Nándor Tánczos (who had been ranked too low to return to parliament prior to Donald's death). Female co-leader Jeanette Fitzsimons stated the party would leave the co-leadership of the party vacant until next party annual general meeting (AGM) the following June. The AGM was held on 3 June 2006 in Lower Hutt with the ballot being conducted via preferential voting.

== Candidates ==
Four candidates were nominated for the leadership:

- David Clendon, a lecturer in environmental management and Green candidate for Waitakere in 1999 and 2005 who had been the national co-convener of the party from 2001 to 2003.
- Russel Norman, the Green Party's development coordinator and 2005 election campaign manager who was the Green candidate for Rimutaka in 2002 and a list candidate in 2005.
- Nándor Tánczos, the co-founder of Hempstore Aotearoa and List MP since 1999.
- Mike Ward, a former Nelson City Councillor, co-leader of the Values Party from 1984 to 1989 and List MP from 2002 to 2005.

Declined

- Keith Locke declined to stand for the leadership stating the party needed a younger leader.

== Campaign ==
There was much media speculation that the leadership contest would be a "two-horse race" between Tánczos and Norman. Clendon, however, took exception to speculation that Tánczos and Norman were the only two serious contenders. During the campaign Ward confirmed he would run for election to be Mayor of Nelson in 2007 regardless of whether he was co-leader or not.

== Result ==
The vote of 110 party delegates was won by Norman on the first ballot by a decisive two-to-one majority over Tánczos, with Clendon third and Ward last.

== Aftermath ==
Norman was not an MP and co-led the party from outside parliament for two years. Tánczos resigned from parliament in June 2008 and Ward was next on the Green party list to re-enter parliament. He initially declined to stand aside so that Norman could take Tánczos's list seat. Ward changed his mind, because of the advantages in having the party co-leader in Parliament during an election year. Norman became an MP on 27 June. He remained in parliament as co-leader until 2015 when he resigned.
