= 2009 Green Party of Aotearoa New Zealand co-leadership election =

- 30 May 2009
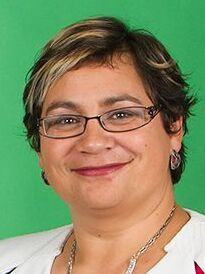

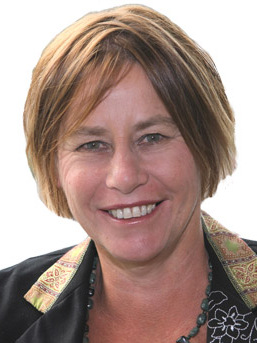
Candidate	Metiria Turei	Sue Bradford
Popular vote	≥61	≤59
Co-leader before election
Jeanette Fitzsimons
Co-leader after election
Metiria Turei

The 2009 Green Party of Aotearoa New Zealand co-leadership election was held was held to elect a Green Party co-leader.

The election was won by list MP Metiria Turei.

== Background ==
The election was triggered when co-leader Jeanette Fitzsimons resigned in February 2009, intending to retire from active politics. The Greens election process for co-leader was decided by a STV (single transferable vote) system. Each electorate could send two delegates to vote in the election. The election was held at the Greens' annual conference, held in Dunedin.

== Candidates ==
Of the many potential candidates only two were nominated:

Declared

- Sue Bradford, former vice-president of the NewLabour Party (1989–1990) and a list MP since 1999
- Metiria Turei, a list MP since 2002 and musterer (whip) since 2005

Declined

- Catherine Delahunty, former co-convenor of the Green Party (2003–2005) and list MP since 2008
- Sue Kedgley, former Wellington City Councillor (1992–2000) and list MP since 1999

== Campaign ==
Turei was "quietly confident" she would win the contest. She stated her leadership style if elected would be focused on the grassroots and represent a "steady as she goes" approach. Her reputation was for placing a Māori analysis on Green issues and more focused on social justice than environmental issues.

Bradford was seen as the underdog, even acknowledging so herself. Like Turei she was seen as having a stronger background in social justice than environmental issues. She was best known publicly for championing controversial changes to child discipline laws, particularly the repeal of Section 59 of the Crimes Act. Bradford accepted it has affected her public image and some party members saw her as "too controversial."

== Result ==
The vote of 120 party delegates was won by Turei by a narrow margin over Bradford.

== Aftermath ==
Bradford announced on 25 September her intention to resign as a Member of Parliament in late October, citing disappointment after her loss in the leadership election as well as wishing to take new directions. Turei was a co-leader of the party until she resigned on 9 August 2017.
