= 1995 Green Party of Aotearoa New Zealand co-leadership elections =

- 21 May 1995
- Male co-leadership election
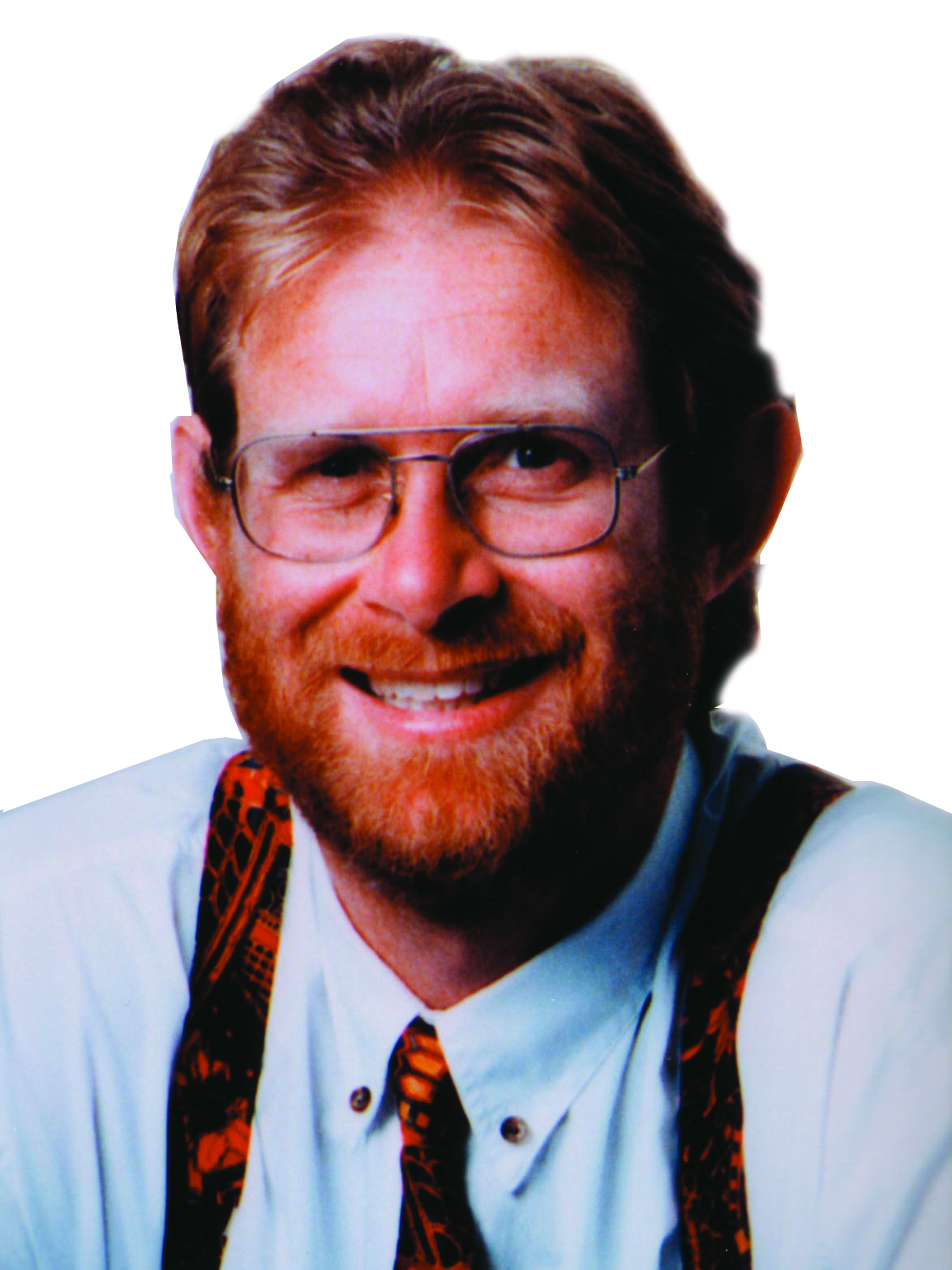

| Candidate | Rod Donald | Joel Cayford | Mike Smith |
| Delegate vote | Elected | Eliminated | Eliminated |
- Female co-leadership election
Candidate
Delegate vote

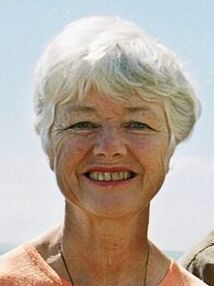
Jeanette Fitzsimons
Unopposed
Co-leaders before election
None
Elected Co-leaders
Rod Donald
Jeanette Fitzsimons

The 1995 Green Party of Aotearoa New Zealand co-leadership elections were elections that took place on 21 May 1995 to determine the future leadership of the Green Party of Aotearoa New Zealand.

The elections were held at the party's annual conference at Tauhara, near Taupō. The conference determined the party would use a gender-based co-leadership model and elected Rod Donald and Jeanette Fitzsimons to fill those roles. Donald and Fitzsimons would lead the Green Party until their respective death and retirement in 2005 and 2009.

== Background ==
The Green Party was founded in May 1990 when the remnants of the Values Party merged with a number of other environmentalist organisations to form the modern Green Party ahead of the 1990 election. When the party formed it deliberately had no formal leadership, using an "organic" rather than "hierarchical" structure. This model was briefly tried in the Values Party (outside election years). In December 1991 the Greens became founding members of the Alliance, a five-party grouping that also consisted of the Democrats, Liberals, Mana Motuhake and NewLabour Party. In May 1992, at the party's annual conference, members voted by a 4 to 1 margin to officially join the Alliance. Unlike the Greens the Alliance had a more formalised leadership structure. Four members of the Greens were required to sit on the Alliance's council which governed the party. Jon Field, Stewart Harrex, Alyson Clarke and Ashok Parbhu were elected to represent the Greens at the council. At the Alliance's inaugural party conference in November 1992 party members elected Green Party member Jeanette Fitzsimons as a co-deputy leader of the Alliance.

By the time of the 1995 Green annual conference in Taupō, the Greens still had no elected leaders. The closest thing the party had to formal leaders were the party's two co-convenors, the equivalent to the party president of other parties. At that conference it was decided that the party should have formal leadership. It was seen as a way to boost the party profile and differentiate itself from the Alliance. It was also argued that the wider public did not understand the "no leaders" leadership structure. Fitzsimons had also experienced that many people, both outside the party and within it, assumed incorrectly that she was the party's leader, likely due to her status as Alliance co-deputy leader. Co-leadership models had been used before by the Values Party from 1981 to 1990, including a period with three co-leaders. Prior to this it had one party leader, the same as all other political parties in New Zealand at the time.

At the conference, the party determined it would have a gender-based co-leadership model. Other options considered included continuing the status quo of no leader, having an Alliance-like model with a leader and two deputy co-leaders, and having two co-leaders and two deputy co-leaders. The gender-based co-leadership model was seen as an evolution of the "team" approach of having no formal leader and was based on Green Party policy of affirmative action for women. Rod Donald would later say he saw gender balance as a means to "effectively represent society and to reflect the gender make-up of society ... at a very practical level, we believe that lots of good women have been held back because of bias in favour of men."

== Candidates ==
Three candidates were nominated for the male co-leadership:

- Rod Donald, an environmental activist from Christchurch and former chairman of the Electoral Reform Coalition.
- Dr. Joel Cayford, an Auckland computer analyst and Alliance candidate for North Shore in 1993.
- Mike Smith, the secretary of the Alliance council and Alliance candidate for Kapiti in 1993.

Only one candidate was nominated for the female co-leadership:

- Jeanette Fitzsimons, a former university lecturer from Auckland and co-deputy leader of the Alliance. She had been a Values Party candidate in the 1970s, as well as the party's energy spokesperson, and Alliance candidate for the Hauraki electorate in 1993.

== Result ==
The voting was conducted by annual conference delegates from electorates across the country. Donald won the secret ballot for the male co-leadership ahead of Cayford and Smith, while Fitzsimons was declared elected unopposed for the female co-leadership.

== Aftermath ==
Both Donald and Fitzsimons were elected as list MPs at the 1996 election for the Alliance. In 1997, feeling that membership of the Alliance was subsuming its identity, the Green Party made the decision to stand candidates as a separate party at the next election. At the 1999 election, the Greens won 5.16% of the vote giving them seven seats in Parliament. Donald continued as co-leader until his death in 2005. Fitzsimons remained co-leader until 2009 when she retired.
