= Metiria Turei =

New Zealand politician

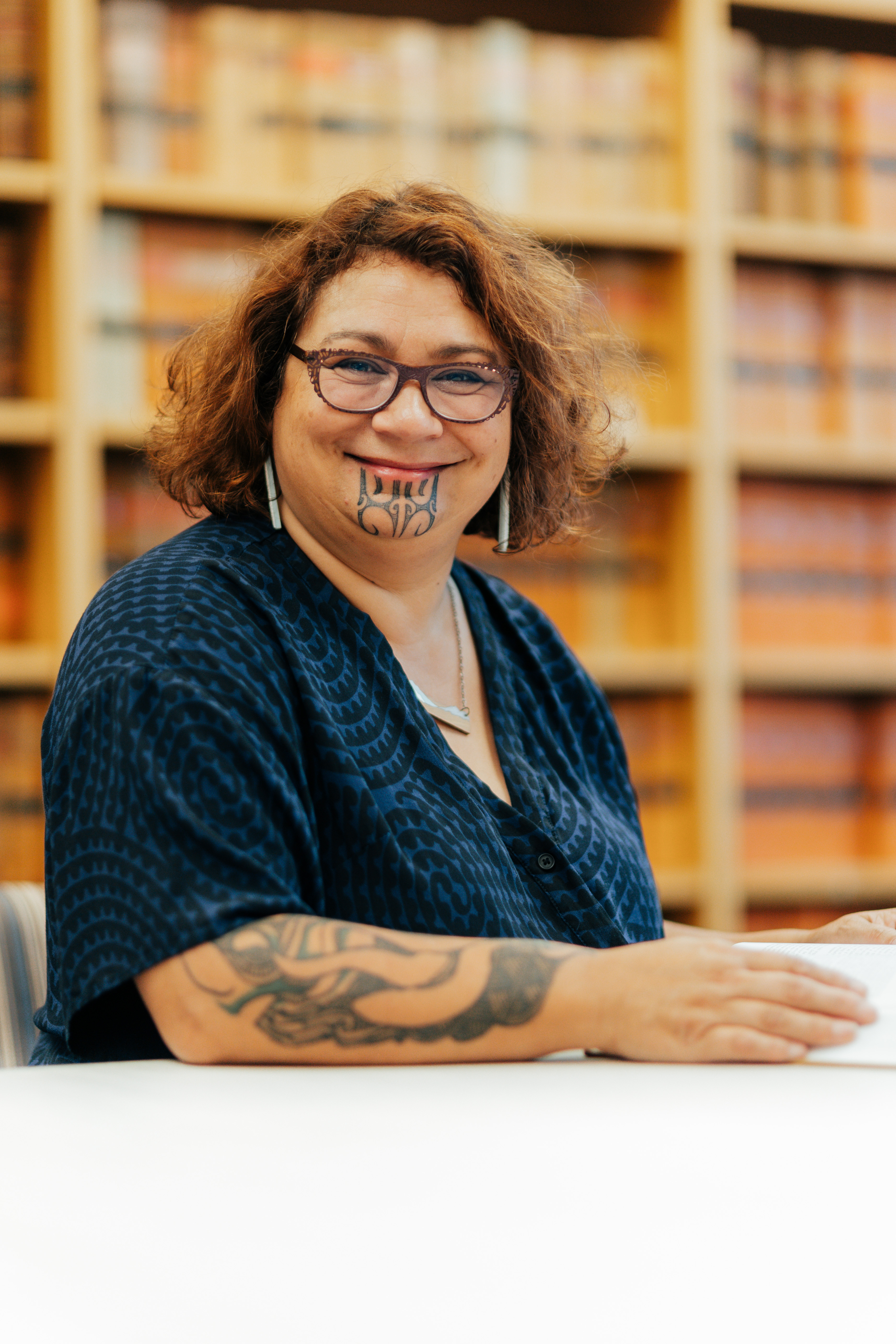
- Turei in 2022

4th Co-leader of the Green Party
- In office 30 May 2009 – 9 August 2017 Co-leading with Russel Norman, then James Shaw
- Preceded by: Jeanette Fitzsimons
- Succeeded by: Marama Davidson

Member of the New Zealand Parliament for Green Party List
- In office 27 July 2002 – 23 September 2017

Personal details
- Born: 13 February 1970 (age 56) Palmerston North, New Zealand
- Party: Green Party (2002–present); Aotearoa Legalise Cannabis Party (1996); McGillicuddy Serious Party (1993, 1999)
- Spouse: Warwick Stanton
- Children: Piupiu Turei (daughter)
- Education: University of Auckland
- Occupation: Commercial lawyer

Metiria Leanne Agnes Stanton Turei (born 1970) is a New Zealand academic and former politician. She was a Member of Parliament from 2002 to 2017, and the female co-leader of the Green Party of Aotearoa New Zealand from 2009 to 2017. Turei resigned from the co-leader position on 9 August 2017 amid a political controversy arising from her admission to lying to the Ministry of Social Development to receive higher payments when she was on the Domestic Purposes Benefit, and later, to being enrolled to vote in an electorate where she was not eligible when she was 23.

She was the Green Party spokesperson on Inequality, Justice, and Building and Housing. She resigned as co-leader of the Green Party and a list candidate immediately prior to the 2017 general election, and retired from politics.

== Early years ==
Metiria Turei grew up in a working-class Māori family in Palmerston North in the North Island. She is of Ngāti Kahungunu and Āti Hau nui a Pāpārangi descent. She failed her high school examinations and in 1987 she worked her first job as a kitchen-hand at the Hard Rock Café in Palmerston North working the late shift. Between 1989 and 1991, Turei was the Tumuaki ("Head") of Te Iwi Maori Rawakore o Aotearoa (Note: Te Iwi Maori Rawakore o Aotearoa is a group whose name translates approximately as "The Impoverished Māori of New Zealand") and involved with Te Roopu Rawakore o Aotearoa. Turei was a founding member of the Random Trollops performance art troupe. She studied law at the University of Auckland and later worked as a commercial lawyer at Simpson Grierson.

== Political career ==
She was a candidate for the McGillicuddy Serious Party in the 1993 election, for the Aotearoa Legalise Cannabis Party in the 1996 election and for McGillicuddy Serious again in the 1999 election. In 2001 she stood as the Green Party candidate for Mayor of Auckland, finishing a distant fifth with 2.05% of the vote.

=== Member of Parliament ===
New Zealand Parliament
Years	Term	Electorate	List	Party
2002–2005	47th	List	8	Green
2005–2008	48th	List	6	Green
2008–2011	49th	List	4	Green
2011–2014	50th	List	1	Green
2014–2017	51st	List	1	Green

In the 2002 general election, the Green Party received 7.00% of the vote, which allowed them 9 seats in Parliament. Turei, standing in Tāmaki Makaurau, was ranked 8th on the Green Party's party list, and so entered Parliament as a list MP. When she was elected, Turei left her job as a corporate lawyer for Simpson Grierson to become a Member of Parliament.

She retained her place in Parliament ranked 6th on the Greens' list in the 2005 election when she stood in Te Tai Tonga.

==== 2005–2008 ====
In 2009, Turei's Misuse of Drugs (Medicinal Cannabis) Amendment Bill was drawn from the member's ballot. The bill received a conscience vote at its first reading, but was defeated 84–34. Later that year, her Liquor Advertising (Television and Radio) Bill was also drawn, but it too was defeated.

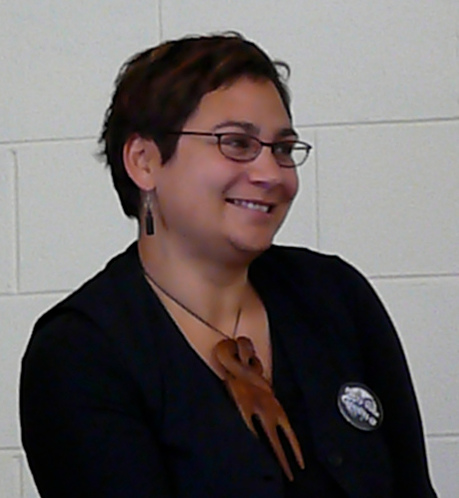
Turei in 2008

In 2008 she was ranked 4th on the Green Party's list and stood in the Dunedin North electorate. She lost the election in Dunedin North to Labour's Pete Hodgson, finishing third with 11.09% of the vote. However she was returned to parliament due to her high ranking on the Green Party list.

==== 2008–2011 ====
On 30 May 2009 Turei was elected as the fourth co-leader (and second female co-leader) of the Green Party. Green Party policy at the time required that there be both a male and a female co-leader. She was elected ahead of veteran MP Sue Bradford.

In July 2009 Turei's Marine Animals Protection Law Reform Bill, intended to strengthen protection for dolphins and other marine mammals, was drawn from the member's ballot. The bill was defeated at its first reading later that month.

In September 2009 Turei led the Green campaign opposing the government's plans to allow mining in New Zealand's national parks. Her Crown Minerals (Protection of Public Conservation Land Listed in the Fourth Schedule) Amendment Bill, which aimed to strengthen the protection for national parks, was drawn from the member's ballot in April 2010.

==== 2011–2014 ====
In October 2012 her Criminal Proceeds (Recovery) Act 2009 (Application to Casinos) Amendment bill was drawn from the ballot. Before its first reading however, National, ACT and United Future said they would not be voting for it.

Turei, along with the rest of the Green Party, voted in support of Marriage (Definition of Marriage) Amendment Act 2013, allowing same-sex couples to legally marry in New Zealand.

==== 2017 general election ====
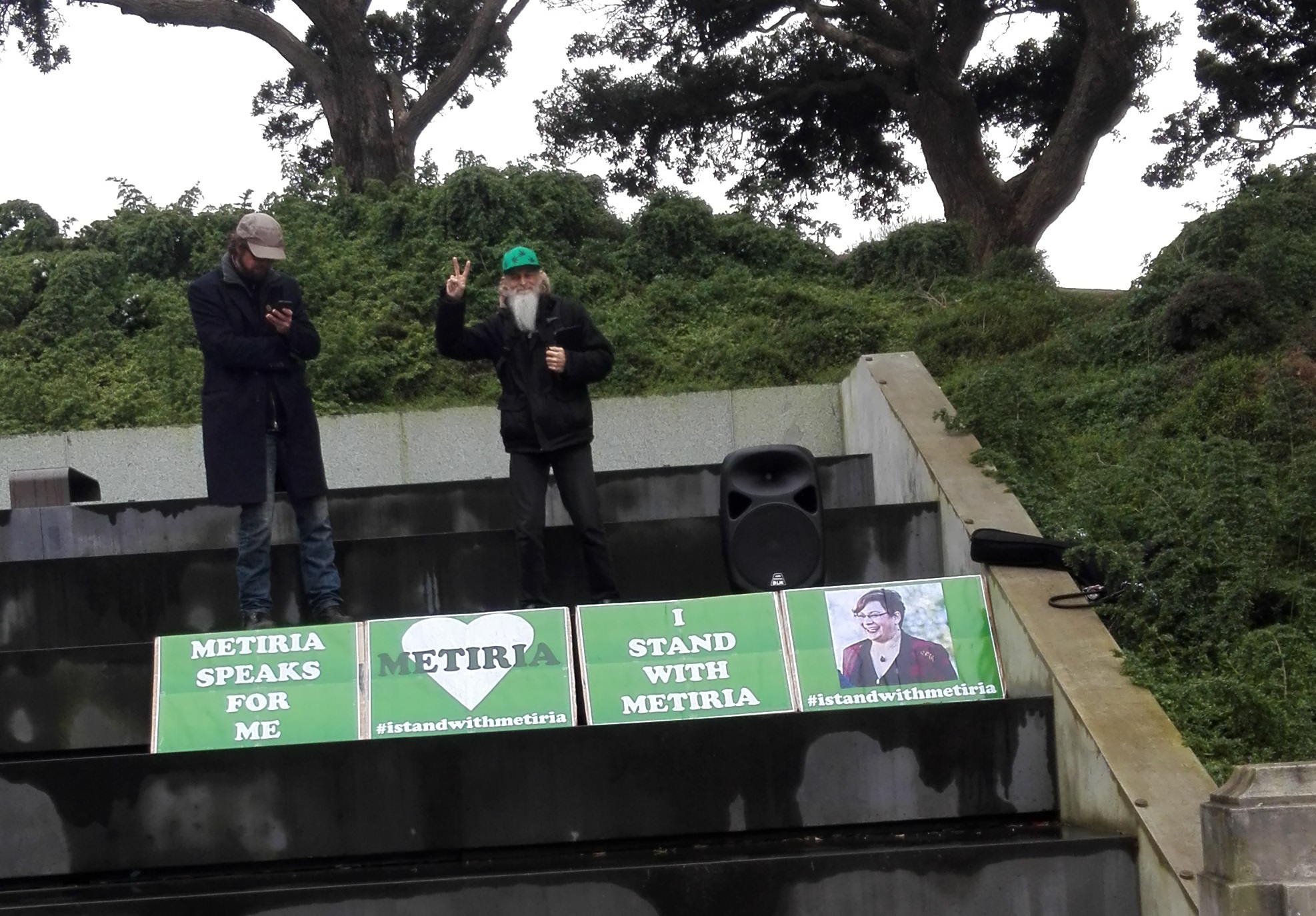
Political activists with banners saying "I stand with Metiria"

During the 2017 election campaign, Turei said during an interview on TVNZ's Q+A Show that the New Zealand First leader Winston Peters "was on a roll partly because of a very racist approach to immigration." Her comments triggered fierce criticism from Peters and NZ First Deputy Leader Tracey Martin, who denied Turei's claims and warned that there would be consequences for the Greens in any post-election talks with NZ First. Turei refused to apologise and reiterated that the Greens would still be committed to negotiating a coalition deal with NZ First following the election.

On 16 July 2017, during the launch of the Green Party's 2017 election campaign, Turei admitted to benefit fraud over a period of three years in the early 1990s, stating that she had not disclosed to Work and Income New Zealand that she was accepting rent from flatmates. Turei justified her action on the grounds that she and her young daughter depended on the Domestic Purposes Benefit to survive. During the campaign, Turei advocated raising the domestic purposes benefit for solo parents and low-income families. Turei's disclosure attracted polarising responses from other politicians, the New Zealand media, and blogosphere, and criticism from Social Development Minister Anne Tolley, Labour Party leader Andrew Little, and media commentators Barry Soper and Patrick Gower. The left-wing journalist Chris Trotter and blogger Martyn Bradbury spoke out in support of her, faulting what they considered Work and Income's "punitive" treatment of beneficiaries. When the next Colmar Brunton poll came out covering the period 22 to 27 July, the Green vote had surged to 15%, with some of the support coming from Labour which had fallen to 24%. The low ratings caused Little to resign the Labour Party leadership on 1 August.

The right-wing pressure group New Zealand Taxpayers' Union announced it would invoice her $57,000 in damages but she said it was a political stunt and she would not respond. Some beneficiaries and anti-poverty advocacy groups spoke in support of Turei and she said she had spoken with other beneficiaries who had been withholding information about their benefit status from Work and Income. Turei also advocated an amnesty on beneficiaries, while acknowledging that she had not been aware of an amnesty instituted during the 1990s. On 26 July 2017, Turei announced that she would be meeting with the Ministry of Social Development's investigative unit to calculate how much she would pay back in compensation. It was then revealed that in 1993 Turei had been enrolled to vote at the same address as her child's father. Turei denied living with the father, which would have disqualified her eligibility for the domestic purposes benefit. She stated that she had enrolled at that address in order to vote for a friend; such conduct constitutes an offence under the Electoral Act.

On 7 August 2017, Green Party MPs David Clendon and Kennedy Graham announced that they were planning to resign as Green Party candidates for the 2017 election, due to the fraud revelations and Turei's handling of the resulting situation. Both Clendon and Graham resigned from the party caucus the following day, after the party made moves to remove them.

Turei resigned as co-leader of the Green Party and as a list candidate for the 2017 election on 9 August 2017, saying that the "scrutiny on [her] family has become unbearable." She stated that her intention was to not return to Parliament after the election. Not being on the list meant that, if she failed to win the electorate of Te Tai Tonga where she was standing, she would not return to Parliament after the election. During August, the Green party fell in opinion polls to around the 5% threshold, below which there wouldn't be representation in Parliament, and Labour's new leader, Jacinda Ardern, generated such a turnaround that by the end of the month, Labour overtook National in the ratings. In its 26 August edition, the New Zealand Listener called Turei's admissions a "spectacular own goal" that "led to Labour's changing of the guard and reversal of fortunes".

The media outcry over the case and extensive coverage given to the benefit fraud by the mainstream media in New Zealand has led to claims of political agendas being promoted by the media. Specifically the case has been contrasted with that of Bill English (and the relative lack of media and public "outrage"), and to a lesser extent, that of John Key.

According to The Spinoff journalist Madeleine Chapman, Turei's resignation had come as a result of Ardern sending two members of her team, rumoured to be Grant Robertson and her chief of staff Neale Jones, to inform Greens co-leader Shaw and his team that Ardern would not be giving Turei a cabinet or ministerial position within a potential Labour government. As a face–saving measure, Turei had organised her own press conference where she announced that she would not ask for a ministerial position in a Labour–led government but would remain co-leader of the Greens until the 2017 election.

During the 2017 election, Turei contested the Te Tai Tonga Māori electorate (which covers Wellington and the entire South Island). She was defeated by Labour's candidate Rino Tirikatene and retired from politics.

=== Electoral history ===
Electoral history of Metiria Turei

1993 general election: New Lynn
Party	Candidate	Votes	%	±%
Labour	Jonathan Hunt	6,974	38.85	−3.09
Alliance	Cliff Robinson	5,376	29.95	
National	Roger Seavill	3,642	20.29	
NZ First	Dawn Mullins	1,474	8.21	
Christian Heritage	Charles Hinds	360	2.00	
McGillicuddy Serious	Metiria Turei	121	0.67	
Majority		1,598	8.90	+2.80
Turnout		17,947	83.95	+4.41
Registered electors		21,378		

2001 Auckland City mayoral election
Party	Candidate	Votes	%	±%
Independent	John Banks	47,059	43.60	
Independent	Christine Fletcher	31,699	29.37	−10.92
Alliance	Matt McCarten	15,785	14.62	
Independent	Tony Gibson	5,714	5.29	
Green	Metiria Turei	2,213	2.05	
Independent	Sue Henry	1,761	1.63	+0.86
Christians Against Abortion	Phil O'Connor	1,258	1.16	+0.24
One NZ	Walter Christie	1,189	1.10	
Communist League	Felicity Coggan	610	0.56	+0.30
Independent	Fran Van Helmond	437	0.40	
Informal votes		203	0.18	
Majority		15,397	14.26	
Turnout		107,928	42.73	−8.47

2002 general election: Tamaki Makaurau
Notes:	Blue background denotes the winner of the electorate vote. Pink background denotes a candidate elected from their party list. Yellow background denotes an electorate win by a list member, or other incumbent. A ✓ or ✗ denotes status of any incumbent, win or lose respectively.						
Party	Candidate	Votes	%	±%	Party votes	%	±%
Labour	John Tamihere	11,445	73.35		9,052	55.97	
Green	Metiria Turei	2,001	12.82		1,659	10.26	
National	George Rongokino Ngatai	785	5.03		516	3.19	
Alliance	Janice Smith	550	3.52		470	2.91	
Christian Heritage	Tuhimareikura Vaha'akolo	472	3.02		240	1.48	
Progressive	Sue Wharewhaka-Topia Watts	351	2.25		228	1.41	
NZ First					2,430	15.03	
Mana Māori					464	2.87	
Legalise Cannabis					423	2.62	
United Future New Zealand					411	2.54	
ACT					223	1.38	
ORNZ					51	0.32	
One NZ					4	0.02	
NMP					2	0.01	
Informal votes		380			122		
Total valid votes		15,604			16,173		
Turnout		16,688	54.22				
Labour win new seat	Majority	9,444	60.52				

2005 general election: Te Tai Tonga
Notes:	Blue background denotes the winner of the electorate vote. Pink background denotes a candidate elected from their party list. Yellow background denotes an electorate win by a list member, or other incumbent. A ✓ or ✗ denotes status of any incumbent, win or lose respectively.						
Party	Candidate	Votes	%	±%	Party votes	%	±%
Labour	✓ Mahara Okeroa	9,015	47.23	−15.94	11,485	57.89	
Māori Party	Monte Ohia	6,512	34.12	+34.12	3,481	17.55	
Green	Metiria Turei	2,296	12.03		1,283	6.47	
Progressive	Russell Caldwell	705	3.69		169	0.85	
Destiny	Maru Samuel	559	2.93		235	1.18	
National					1,462	7.37	
NZ First					1,240	6.25	
United Future					211	1.06	
Legalise Cannabis					159	0.80	
ACT					58	0.29	
Alliance					14	0.07	
Christian Heritage					9	0.05	
Democrats					8	0.04	
Family Rights					7	0.04	
Libertarianz					4	0.02	
One NZ					4	0.02	
99 MP					3	0.02	
Direct Democracy					3	0.02	
RONZ					3	0.02	
Informal votes		655			322		
Total valid votes		19,087			19,838		
Labour hold	Majority	2,503	13.11	−38.99			

2008 general election: Dunedin North
Notes:	Blue background denotes the winner of the electorate vote. Pink background denotes a candidate elected from their party list. Yellow background denotes an electorate win by a list member, or other incumbent. A ✓ or ✗ denotes status of any incumbent, win or lose respectively.						
Party	Candidate	Votes	%	±%	Party votes	%	±%
Labour	✓ Pete Hodgson	17,127	52.62	−2.46	14,608	44.24	−10.58
National	Michael Woodhouse	9,972	30.64	−0.79	9,692	29.35	+4.21
Green	Metiria Turei	3,611	11.09	+3.64	5,221	15.81	+4.99
ACT	Hilary Calvert	573	1.76	+1.15	749	2.27	+1.28
Legalise Cannabis	Julian Crawford	483	1.48	−0.06	143	0.43	+0.14
Alliance	Victor Billot	448	1.38	+0.54	106	0.32	+0.12
United Future New Zealand	Mary Edwards	228	0.70	−1.32	312	0.94	−1.82
Democrats	Olive McRae	105	0.32	+0.32	36	0.11	+0.05
NZ First					1,132	3.43	+0.58
Progressive					310	0.94	−1.38
Bill and Ben					252	0.76	+0.76
Māori Party					230	0.70	+0.41
Kiwi					125	0.38	+0.38
Family Party					57	0.17	+0.17
Workers Party					18	0.05	+0.05
Pacific					14	0.04	+0.04
Libertarianz					9	0.03	−0.01
RAM					4	0.01	+0.01
RONZ					2	0.01	−0.01
Informal votes		234			89		
Total valid votes		32,547			33,020		
Labour hold	Majority	7,155	21.98	−1.67			

2011 general election: Dunedin North
Notes:	Blue background denotes the winner of the electorate vote. Pink background denotes a candidate elected from their party list. Yellow background denotes an electorate win by a list member, or other incumbent. A ✓ or ✗ denotes status of any incumbent, win or lose respectively.						
Party	Candidate	Votes	%	±%	Party votes	%	±%
Labour	David Clark	12,976	44.25	−8.37	10,127	33.80	−10.44
National	Michael Woodhouse	9,487	32.35	+1.71	9,707	32.39	+3.04
Green	Metiria Turei	5,721	19.51	+8.42	7,010	23.39	+7.58
Legalise Cannabis	Julian Crawford	398	1.36	−0.13	172	0.57	+0.14
Alliance	Victor Billot	210	0.72	−0.66	50	0.17	−0.15
Democrats	Jeremy Noble	196	0.67	+0.35	62	0.21	+0.10
United Future New Zealand	Peter George	176	0.60	−0.10	183	0.61	−0.33
ACT	Guy McCallum	159	0.54	−1.22	218	0.73	−1.54
NZ First					1,706	5.69	+2.27
Conservative Party of New Zealand					405	1.35	+1.35
Mana					181	0.60	+0.60
Māori Party					126	0.42	−0.28
Libertarianz					18	0.06	+0.03
Informal votes		448			190		
Total valid votes		29,323			29,965		
Labour hold	Majority	3,489	11.90	−10.09			

2014 general election: Dunedin North
Notes:	Blue background denotes the winner of the electorate vote. Pink background denotes a candidate elected from their party list. Yellow background denotes an electorate win by a list member, or other incumbent. A ✓ or ✗ denotes status of any incumbent, win or lose respectively.						
Party	Candidate	Votes	%	±%	Party votes	%	±%
Labour	✓ David Clark	16,315	47.40	+3.15	11,147	31.82	−1.98
National	Michael Woodhouse	10,398	30.21	−2.14	11,302	32.26	−0.13
Green	Metiria Turei	5,978	17.37	−2.14	8,035	22.94	−0.45
Conservative Party of New Zealand	Jonathan Daley	621	1.80	+1.80	956	2.73	+1.38
Legalise Cannabis	Abe Gray	580	1.69	+0.33	172	0.49	−0.08
Internet	Rob Stewart	255	0.74	+0.74			
Independent	Adrian Daegal Graamans	106	0.31	+0.31			
Democrats	Miriam Mowat	159	0.31	−0.36	37	0.11	−0.10
Independent	Stan Lusby	62	0.18	+0.18			
NZ First					2,364	6.75	+1.06
Internet Mana					603	1.72	+1.12 (Note: 2014 Internet Mana swing is relative to the votes for Mana in 2011; it shared a party list with Internet in the 2014 election.)
Māori Party					124	0.35	−0.07
ACT					111	0.32	−0.41
United Future New Zealand					86	0.25	−0.29
Ban 1080					60	0.17	+0.17
Civilian					27	0.08	+0.08
Independent Coalition					7	0.02	+0.02
Focus					1	0.00	+0.00
Informal votes		216			99		
Total valid votes		34,636			35,131		
Turnout		35,230	79.88	+11.50			
Labour hold	Majority	5,917	17.19	+5.29			

2017 general election: Te Tai Tonga
Notes:	Blue background denotes the winner of the electorate vote. Pink background denotes a candidate elected from their party list. Yellow background denotes an electorate win by a list member, or other incumbent. A ✓ or ✗ denotes status of any incumbent, win or lose respectively.						
Party	Candidate	Votes	%	±%	Party votes	%	±%
Labour	✓ Rino Tirikatene	10,416	44.44	+2.67	13,484	55.80	+19.1
Green	Metiria Turei	5,740	24.50	+8.81	1,963	8.12	−8.29
Māori Party	Mei Reedy-Taare	4,915	20.97	−3.22	2,030	8.40	−2.79
Legalise Cannabis	Emma-Jane Mihaere Kingi	1,625	6.93	+1.96	280	1.16	−15.25
National					3,014	12.47	−2.45
NZ First					1,926	7.80	−5.02
Opportunities					944	3.91	
Mana					123	0.51	
Ban 1080					58	0.24	−0.24
ACT					48	0.20	+0.03
People's Party					20	0.82	
Conservative Party of New Zealand					18	0.075	−0.68
Outdoors					11	0.046	
United Future					10	0.041	−0.049
Internet					6	0.025	
Democrats					5	0.021	−0.5
Informal votes		738			226		
Total valid votes		24,166			23,434		
Labour hold	Majority	4,676	19.95	+2.37			

== Life after politics ==
In October 2018, Metiria Turei gave her first interview since leaving politics. During the interview, she revealed that she is studying art at the Dunedin School of Art, and has work entered in a group show "wā o mua" at the Blue Oyster Art Project Space in Dunedin. Her futurist art collection tūruapō was exhibited at The Wallace Arts Centre in Auckland in 2021.

As of 2025, Turei lectures in law at the University of Otago. In 2026 she was promoted to associate professor. She writes a regular political column in the Otago Daily Times.

== Personal life ==
Metiria Turei has a daughter, Piupiu Turei, and is married to Warwick Stanton. In February 2014, Turei and her husband were living in Waitati, close to the shore of Blueskin Bay, a coastal estuary to the north of Dunedin. She is also a performing arts enthusiast and participated in a performing group called Random Trollops and medieval reenactments at her Blueskin Bay home.

== Bibliography ==
- Chapman, Madeleine (2020). Jacinda Ardern: A New Kind of Leader (Paperback ed.). Sydney: Nero Books. pp. 93–94. ISBN 9781760641818.
- Turei, Metiria (2017). "Stroke of Genius and Luck". In Katene, Selwyn & Katene, Rāhui (eds.). Point of Order, My Speaker?: Modern Māori Political Leaders. Huia Publishers. pp. 177–205. ISBN 978-1-77550-332-3.

Party political offices
Preceded by Jeanette Fitzsimons	Female co-leader of the Green Party; 2009–2017; Served alongside: Russel Norman, James Shaw	Succeeded by Marama Davidson
