= Green Party of Aotearoa New Zealand =

Political party in New Zealand

Green Party of Aotearoa New Zealand Rōpū Kākāriki o Aotearoa, Niu Tireni (Māori)
- Co-leaders: Marama Davidson; Chlöe Swarbrick
- Founded: 26 May 1990; 36 years ago
- Preceded by: Values Party
- Headquarters: Level 5, 108 The Terrace, Wellington
- Youth wing: Young Greens
- LGBTQ wing: Rainbow Greens
- Ideology: Green politics; Social democracy; Faction: Anti-capitalism
- Political position: Centre-left to left-wing
- National affiliation: Alliance (1991–1997)
- Regional affiliation: Asia Pacific Greens Federation
- International affiliation: Global Greens
- Colours: Green
- Slogan: For All of Us (2026 campaign slogan)
- House of Representatives: 15 / 123
- Regional councillors: 3 / 132
- Local councillors: 10 / 718
- Mayors: 1 / 67

Website
- greens.org.nz

The Green Party of Aotearoa New Zealand (Māori: Rōpū Kākāriki o Aotearoa, Niu Tireni), commonly known as the Greens or the Green Party, are an environmentalist and social democratic green political party in New Zealand. They are currently the third largest party in the House of Representatives, with 15 of the 120 members, sitting as the second largest opposition party.

The party has helped form government three times, providing confidence and supply to the Labour–Alliance coalition from 1999 to 2002, the Labour–New Zealand First coalition from 2017 to 2020, and the Labour majority government from 2020 to 2023. During the latter two of these, the party had ministers outside cabinet.

The party traces its origins to the Values Party, founded in 1972. In 1990, the current party was created and was a part of the Alliance from 1991 until 1997. The party first won seats in Parliament in 1996 as part of the Alliance. Since 1997, it has contested general elections independently of the now mainly defunct Alliance, and has achieved above the 5% threshold each time. The party's weakest showing was 2005 when it elected 6 members on 5.3% of the party vote; its strongest was 2023 when it elected 15 members on 11.6% of the party vote (including three electorate MPs).

The party has also successfully run candidates in local body elections; some candidates run under the Green Party brand whilst others run as independents with endorsement. Following the 2025 local elections, the party has thirteen regional and local councillors, and one elected mayor. In Auckland, some Green members run as City Vision candidates, particularly in the city centre. In Christchurch, Green members typically run as part of The People's Choice. Green endorsed mayors have been elected in Dunedin, Wellington, and Whakatāne.

== Precursors ==
The Green Party traces its origins to the Values Party, the world's first national-level environmentalist party. The Values Party originated in 1972 at Victoria University of Wellington.

While it gained a measure of public support in several elections, the first-past-the-post electoral system meant that the party did not win any seats in Parliament. Some of the founding members of the Green Party, including Jeanette Fitzsimons, Rod Donald and Mike Ward, had been active members of the Values Party at the outset of the Green movement in the 1970s.

In 1989, multiple candidates stood for local government positions under a "green" label. It saw the election of New Zealand's first "green" city councillor, Stephen Rainbow, in Wellington. He was joined the next year by councillor Merrin Downing, who left the Citizens' Association to join the Greens.

In May 1990, remnants of the Values Party merged with a number of other environmentalist organisations to form the modern Green Party. This sparked a resurgence of support, with the new group winning 6.85% of the vote (but no seats) in the 1990 election.

== History ==
=== The Alliance (1991–1997) ===
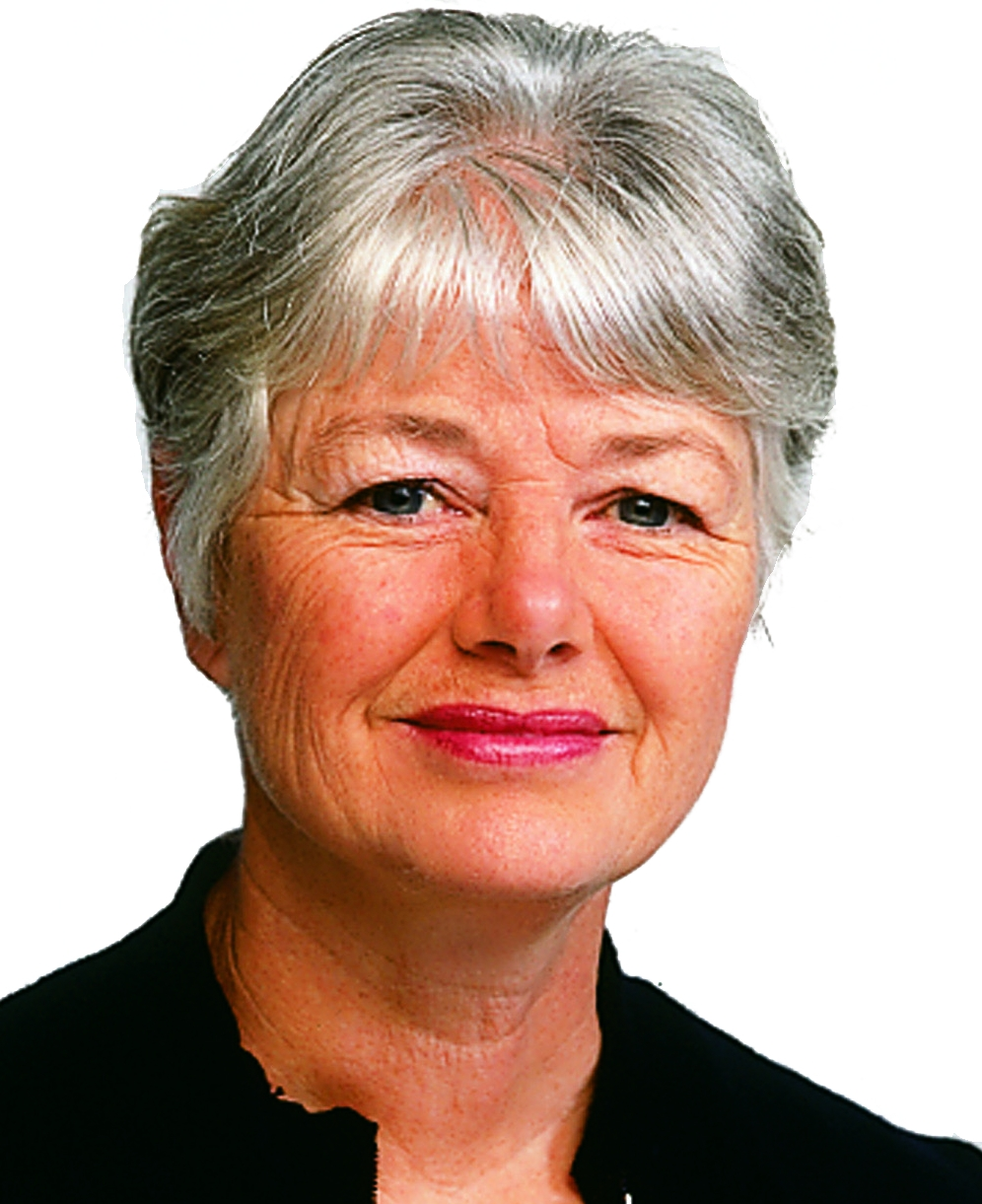
Former Green Party co-leader Jeanette Fitzsimons

The newly formed Green Party became a founding member of the Alliance, a five-party grouping that also included the Democrats, Liberals, Mana Motuhake and NewLabour Party. Immediately prior to this there had been limited co-operation between the parties running joint candidates in several local by-elections in Auckland. One candidate, Ruth Norman, was from the Greens and was elected to the Auckland Regional Council. At the Alliance's inaugural party conference in November 1992, party members elected Jeanette Fitzsimons as one of the co-deputy leaders of the Alliance.

The party contested the 1993 and 1996 elections as part of the Alliance. Membership in the Alliance was a controversial decision with a sizeable minority in the party remaining opposed to it. Consequently, the party was plagued in the following few years by persistent calls for departure from the Alliance. Over time the issue became a more divisive issue internally until eventually a splinter party, the Progressive Green Party, was set up by members who were unhappy at the direction of the Alliance, which they believed was too left-wing and too focused on social justice issues, detracting focus from environmental issues.

Until the 1995 annual conference in Taupō, the party had no elected leaders. At that conference, Jeanette Fitzsimons was elected unopposed as female co-leader, and Rod Donald defeated Joel Cayford and Mike Smith in a three-way contest to become male co-leader.

After New Zealand adopted the mixed-member proportional (MMP) electoral system in 1996, the Alliance gained entry to Parliament, bringing three Green list MPs with them: Jeanette Fitzsimons, Rod Donald and Phillida Bunkle.

In 1997, feeling that membership of the Alliance had subsumed their identity, the party made the decision to stand candidates independently of the Alliance at the next election. While most Green party members left the Alliance, some decided to leave the Green Party and stay in the Alliance (including Bunkle, who would later be appointed Minister of Customs in the Labour-Alliance coalition government). Conversely, some of the Alliance party members, who joined the Alliance via other parties, decided to leave the Alliance and join the Green Party. These notably included Sue Bradford and Keith Locke, who both joined the Alliance from NewLabour.

=== Green Party in Parliament ===
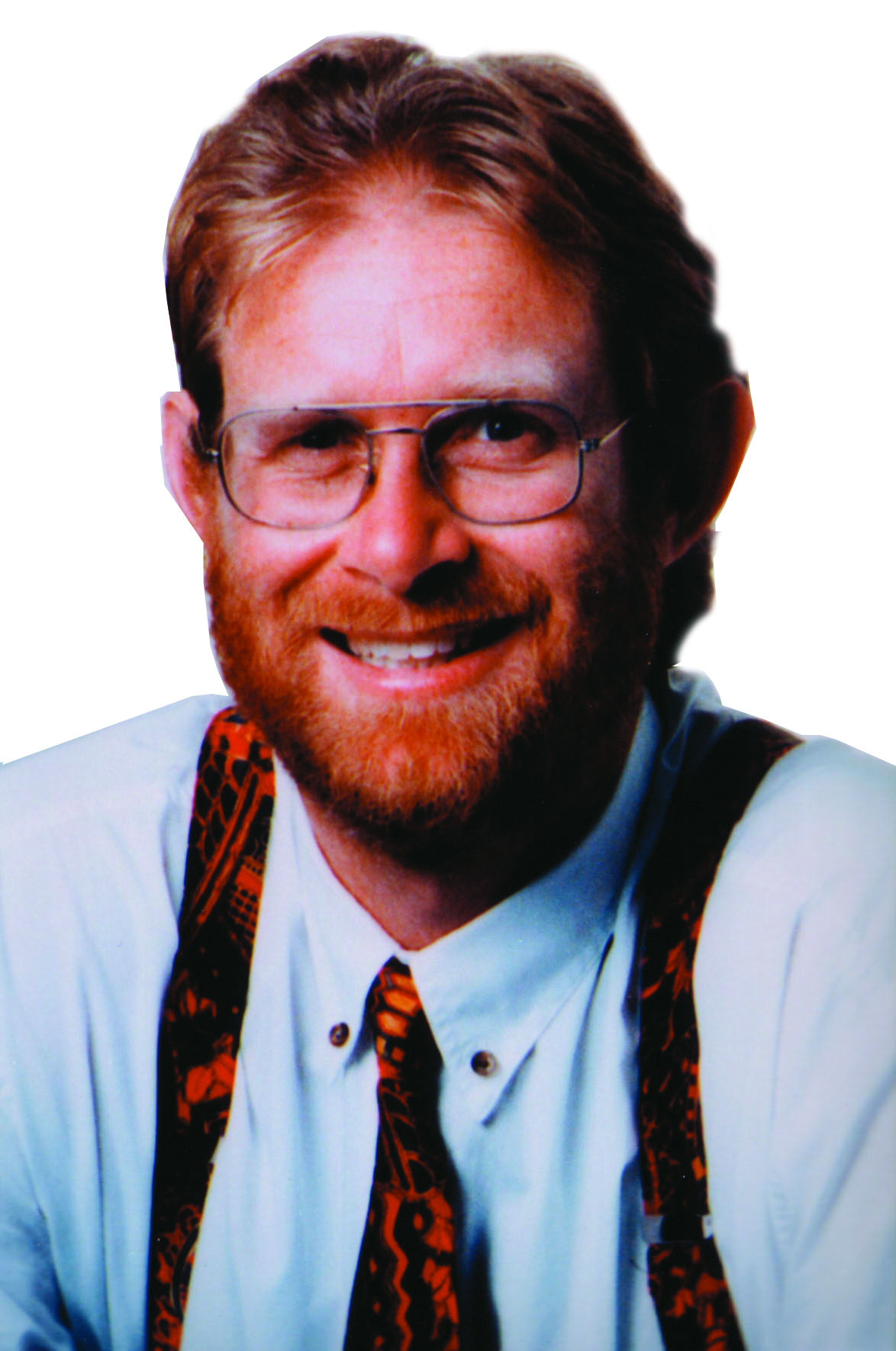
Former Green Party co-leader Rod Donald.

==== 1999 election ====
In the 1999 election, the Greens gained 5.16% of the party vote and seven seats in Parliament. Fitzsimons also won the electorate seat of Coromandel; it is believed that this is the first time a Green candidate won a first-past-the-post parliamentary election. During the ten days it took to count special votes and confirm Fitzsimons' election, Labour concluded a coalition agreement with the Alliance which excluded the Greens. However, the party supported the government on confidence and supply in return for some input into the budget and legislation. This led to the Greens gaining a $15 million energy efficiency and environmental package in the new government's first budget. Over the term, the Greens developed a good working relationship with the government and also had some input into policy, notably Sue Bradford's amendments to the Employment Relations Act 2000.

==== 2002 election ====
In the 2002 election, the Greens polled 7.00%, increasing their strength in Parliament to nine seats, although they lost the Coromandel electorate. The electoral campaign featured strong tensions between the Greens and Labour. The Greens sharply criticised Labour for its plans to allow a moratorium on genetic engineering to expire, and believing that Labour would require their support to form a government, intended to make the extension of this moratorium a non-negotiable part of any deal. After the election, however, Labour and their coalition partner, the Jim Anderton-led Progressive Coalition, instead opted to rely on support from United Future, at that time a party with conservative Christian overtones.

Although the Greens no longer had any input into the budget, they maintained a close working relationship with the government, and the Greens remained involved in the legislation process. Often the government needed to rely on Green votes in the House to pass progressive legislation not approved by United Future. The government won praise from political commentators for juggling the two diametrically-opposed parties.

==== 2005 election ====
In the 2005 election, the Greens won 5.30%, returning six of their MPs to Parliament. Despite expressing clear support for a Labour-led government during the campaign, they were excluded from the resulting coalition, due to a refusal by United Future and NZ First to work with the Greens in cabinet. They were, however, able to negotiate a cooperation agreement which saw limited input into the budget and broad consultation on policy. Both co-leaders were appointed as government spokespeople outside cabinet, with Fitzsimons responsible for Energy Efficiency, and Donald responsible for the Buy Kiwi Made campaign. However, Rod Donald died the day before Parliament was due to sit and the position of government spokesperson on Buy Kiwi Made was filled by Sue Bradford. Nándor Tánczos took up the vacant list position and the co-leader position remained vacant until a new co-leader, Russel Norman was elected at their 2006 annual general meeting. The other contenders for the position were Nándor Tánczos, David Clendon and former MP Mike Ward. Bradford also introduced, in 2005, the members' bill that would become the Crimes (Substituted Section 59) Amendment Act 2007. The bill sought to outlaw the legal defence of "reasonable force" for parents prosecuted for assault against children. It led to widespread debate and accusations that MPs supporting the bill were fostering a 'nanny state' approach. Despite this, the Bill became law after it passed its third reading on 16 May 2007 with an overwhelming majority of 113 votes for and 7 votes against.

==== 2008 election ====
In the 2008 election, the Greens increased their share of the vote to 6.72%, enough for 9 MPs, even though there was a swing throughout the country to the National Party. This initially gave the Greens two extra MPs, but counting the special votes brought in a third. They became the third largest parliamentary party in New Zealand, and signed a memorandum of understanding with the governing National Party.

Metiria Turei was elected at the 2009 annual general meeting after former female co-leader Jeanette Fitzsimons stood down as an MP in February 2009.

==== 2011 election ====
In the 2011 election, the Green Party received nearly a quarter of a million party votes (247,372), equating to 11.06% of the total valid party votes nationwide, earning them 14 seats in the 50th Parliament. Preliminary results on election night showed them with 10.6% of the vote, equivalent to 13 seats, but special votes increased their support enough to gain an extra seat. They remained the third largest parliamentary party in New Zealand.

==== 2014 election ====
In the 2014 general election, the Green Party's share of the party vote fell slightly to 10.70%. Despite this, they retained all of their 14 seats and remained the third largest party in Parliament.

James Shaw was elected at the party's 2015 annual general meeting over fellow MPs Gareth Hughes and Kevin Hague, and party member Vernon Tava. He succeeded Russel Norman, who resigned in November 2015 to work as Executive Director of Greenpeace Aotearoa New Zealand.

==== 2017 election ====
In their 2017 election campaign launch on 9 July 2017, the Green Party proposed charging bottling companies a 10% tax for exporting water, with the revenue being split between local councils and Māori tribes or iwi. They also announced that they would ban new resource consents for bottling companies until the establishment of a new comprehensive commercial water pricing scheme.

In July 2017, co-leader Metiria Turei criticised the populist New Zealand First party and its leader Winston Peters for alleged racism, particularly towards immigration. List MP Barry Coates penned an article in the left-wing "The Daily Blog" claiming that the Greens would call a snap election rather than be excluded from a prospective Labour and New Zealand First coalition government. Turei and Coates' comments were fiercely criticised by both Peters and New Zealand First MP Tracey Martin, who warned that this would affect post-election negotiations between the two parties. Fellow co-leader Shaw later clarified that Coates' remarks did not represent Green Party policy.

On 16 July, in order to raise awareness of the inadequacies of the welfare system, Turei disclosed that she had committed benefit fraud in the past. Turei also advocated for raising the domestic purposes benefit for families during the Green Party's electoral campaign. Her disclosure generated considerable interest from the media, politicians, and the New Zealand blogosphere. Initially the increased coverage lead to the Greens having their highest poll result ever of 15% while Labour had its lowest in 20 years at 24%, eventually leading to Andrew Little's resignation. However media coverage eventual went against Turei. On 7 August, Green MPs Kennedy Graham and party whip David Clendon resigned as Green Party candidates due to their disagreement with Turei's actions and handling of the situation. They formally resigned from the Green Party's parliamentary caucus the following day after the party made moves to remove them "involuntarily."

On 9 August, Turei resigned as co-leader and as a list candidate, stating that the media scrutiny on her family had become unbearable. James Shaw remained the Green Party's sole leader for the 2017 election. Clendon stated that he would not be returning to the Green Party list despite Turei's resignation. Graham sought to return to the party list, but this was declined on 12 August by the Green Party Executive. Leader James Shaw indicated that there was considerable animosity within the party towards Clendon and Graham for their actions.

On 17 August, it was reported that the Green Party had fallen by 11 points to 4% in the 1News–Colmar Brunton Poll, below the 5% threshold needed to enter Parliament under New Zealand's mixed-member proportional system. The party's sharp drop in the opinion poll was attributed to negative publicity around the Green Party's infighting and the ascension of Jacinda Ardern as leader of the centre-left Labour Party, the Greens' nominal ally. By contrast, the Roy Morgan opinion poll placed public support for the Green Party at 9%.

The 2017 general election returned eight list MPs, with 6.3% of the party vote. The Green parliamentary caucus' newest members were Chlöe Swarbrick, who became the youngest member of the House, and Golriz Ghahraman, the first refugee member of the House.

Following the election results, Party Leader Shaw stated that the Greens would not be seeking a coalition with the National Party. He added that the party was pursuing a coalition rather than a support agreement with the Labour and socially-conservative New Zealand First parties. On 9 October, the Greens leader Shaw took part in negotiations with the Labour Party. During the coalition-forming negotiations, NZ First leader Peters turned down Shaw's invitation for the two parties to negotiate directly on the grounds that the Greens and Labour had campaigned together under a memorandum of understanding during the 2017 election.

=== First term in Government (2017–2020) ===
In October 2017, the Greens entered a confidence and supply arrangement with the Labour Party which gave them three ministers outside cabinet and one under-secretary role. This marked the first time the Greens had been in government. Party leader James Shaw was appointed Minister for Climate Change and Statistics and Associate Minister of Finance. Julie Anne Genter was made Minister for Women and Associate Minister of Health and Transport. Eugenie Sage was made Minister of Conservation and Land Information and Associate Minister for the Environment. Jan Logie was appointed Parliamentary Undersecretary to the Minister of Justice with a focus on domestic and sexual violence issues.

As a support partner of the Labour-New Zealand First coalition government, the Greens secured several policies and concessions including a proposed Zero Carbon Act, a referendum on legalising personal cannabis use by 2020, establishing a proposed Climate Commission, a proposed Green Transport Card to reduce public transportation costs, investing in rail and cycle infrastructure, light rail construction to Auckland Airport, increasing the Department of Conservation's funding, eliminating "excessive" benefit sanctions and the gender pay gap, a rent-to-own-scheme as part of KiwiBuild, and re-establishing the Mental Health Commission.

In 2019, a number of Trans members resigned after a Green Party magazine published an article from a member concerned about the growing divide between women in the party and LGBTQIA+ members.

In late August 2020, Shaw was criticised by members of the Green Party, the opposition National Party, school principals and teachers unions for allocating, in his role as Associate Minister of Finance, NZ$11.7 million from the Government's $3 billion COVID-19 "shovel-ready" recovery fund to the private "Green School New Zealand" in Taranaki. This funding boost contradicted the party's own policy of opposing giving government funds to private schools. Shaw had lobbied for the inclusion of the school in the "shovel-ready" fund, claiming that it would have boosted the local economy and created jobs. Former Green MPs Catherine Delahunty, Mojo Mathers and Sue Bradford denounced Shaw's decision as a betrayal of the Green Party's policies and principles. Shaw subsequently apologised to Green MPs during a Zoom call, describing his action as an "error of judgment." On 2 November, it was reported that the Government had reached an agreement with the school's owners, Michael and Rachel Perrett, for the NZ$11.7 million grant to be converted into a loan; a development that was welcomed by local principals.

==== 2020 election ====
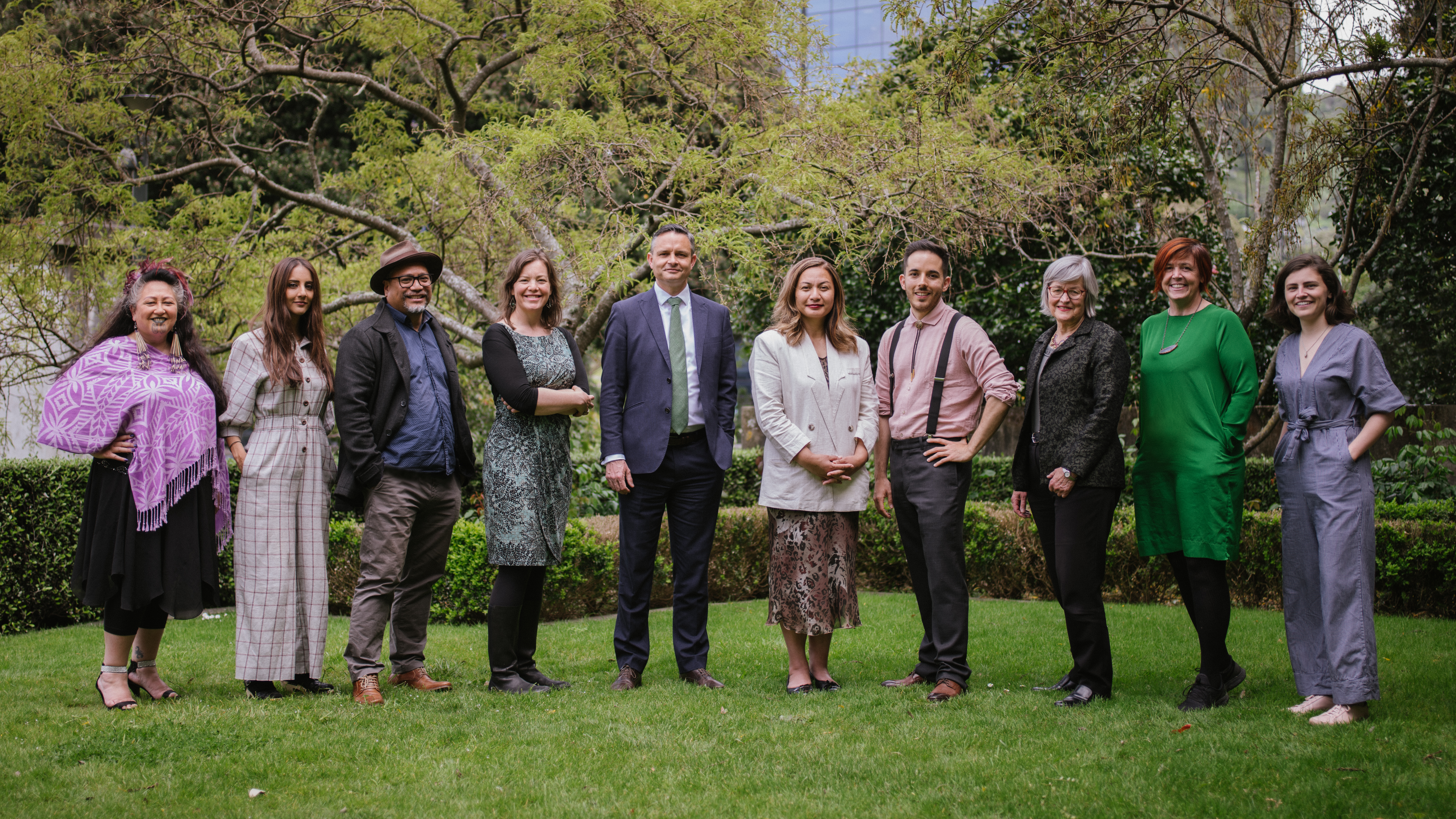
The Green Party caucus, 2020

During the 2020 New Zealand general election held on 17 October, the Greens returned to Parliament with 7.9% of the popular vote, giving them ten seats. In addition, Green MP Chlöe Swarbrick won the Auckland Central electorate seat by 1,068 votes.

Despite the Labour Party winning a parliamentary majority and not needing to form a coalition agreement with other parties, Labour and the Green parties undertook a series of discussions about areas of cooperation. Green co-leader James Shaw had indicated that the Greens would be open to negotiating with Labour about its wealth tax policy as part of coalition negotiations. Earlier, Prime Minister Jacinda Ardern had ruled out supporting the Green's wealth tax policy during campaigning. On 20 October, Newshub reported that Ardern was not seeking a formal coalition between Labour and the Green Party but was exploring a lower-level support arrangement.

=== Second term in Government (2020–2023) ===
Following prolonged negotiations between the Green and Labour parties' leaderships, the Green Party accepted a deal on 31 October under which their co-leaders James Shaw and Marama Davidson would become ministers outside the Cabinet. Under this cooperation agreement, Shaw would remain Minister for Climate Change and become an associate minister for the environment (with responsibility for biodiversity) while Davidson would take the new role of Minister for the Prevention of Family and Sexual Violence and become an associate minister of housing (with responsibility for homelessness). In addition, Green MPs would fill one chair and one deputy chair role on two select committees. Stuff reported that these would likely be held by former ministers Eugenie Sage and Julie Anne Genter on the Environment Committee and Transport Committee, respectively. During a Zoom call, 85% of the 150 Green Party delegates voted to accept this cooperation agreement with Labour.

The agreement was described by Ardern as "honouring the mandate provided to Labour to form a majority Government in our own right" while ensuring the Government "govern[s] for all New Zealanders and to reach as wide a consensus on key issues as possible." Several former Green MPs, including former co-leader Russel Norman, Sue Bradford, and Catherine Delahunty, criticised the cooperation agreement for giving the Greens a weak position to influence the policy process within the newly formed Labour Government.

On 19 May, Ghahraman sponsored a motion on behalf of the Green Party calling for Members of Parliament to recognise the right of Palestinians to self-determination and statehood. The motion was supported by the Greens and the Māori Party but was opposed by the centre-right National and ACT parties. The governing Labour Party also declined to support the Greens' motion, with the Speaker of the House Trevor Mallard criticising Ghahraman for sponsoring the motion despite knowing that it was going to be voted down.

In June 2021, it was revealed the Green Party had received $54,000 in donations from Lindsay Fraser, whom the Royal New Zealand Society for the Prevention of Cruelty to Animals (RNZSPCA) has called the worst animal abuser in New Zealand history.

In July 2021, Shaw's co-leadership of the Greens was challenged by Dunedin climate activist and software developer James Cockle, who expressed dissatisfaction that the Greens were being seen as "Labour's little helper." During a vote at the party's annual general meeting in August 2021, Shaw was overwhelmingly re-elected, winning 116 delegate votes with just four to Cockle.

In January 2022, Radio New Zealand reported that several Green Party executive and policy branch members had resigned from the Party citing disagreement with the Green Party leadership's cooperation agreement with the governing Labour Party, taking issue with what they regarded as the Greens' perceived limited ability to hold the Government to account on policy differences. These former members also alleged Shaw was practising an autocratic leadership style and that the party executive was not holding the parliamentary caucus and leadership to account over policy decisions in government. In addition, several former Green leaders and MPs, including Bradford, Delahunty, and Norman, criticised the party's limited position within the Labour Government, the Government's alleged pro-business policies, and climate change position. In response to criticism, co-leaders Shaw and Davidson claimed that the party was democratic and making "progressive changes" in government.

In early May 2022, the Green Party scrapped its male co-leadership requirement during a weekend special meeting to amend its constitution. Under these changes, the two new co-leaders now need to consist of one woman and one person of any gender (with leadership pathways for non-binary and intersex individuals). In addition, at least one of the future co-leaders is required to be of Māori descent.

On 23 July, an annual general meeting was held online to decide on the party's leadership. While Davidson was re-elected unopposed, 32 of the 107 delegates voted to reopen nominations for Shaw's position, meeting the 25% threshold needed to remove him as co-leader and trigger a leadership election under the party's rules. Shaw was criticised by elements within the party including party member Travis Mischewski and former Green MP Delahunty for his perceived "moderate leadership" and inability to effect change within the Labour Government and tackle climate change. On 25 July, Shaw confirmed that he would contest the co-leadership election. That same day, fellow MPs Chlöe Swarbrick and Elizabeth Kerekere confirmed that they would not be contesting the co-leadership position.

On 10 September, Shaw was re-elected as Green Party co-leader by 142 (97%) of the 145 eligible delegates in the party's special election. Shaw was the only candidate to contest the 2022 co-leadership election.

==== 2023 election ====
As part of the party's policy plan for the 2023 general election it put forward the policy of a guaranteed minimum income for those out of work and those studying of $385 a week for individuals, $770 a week for couples, and $735 for single parents, all after tax. This would be phased in over 2 years and paid for via a wealth tax of 2.5% (two point five percent) on assets worth more than four million New Zealand dollars for couples and two million for singles, as well as a top rate of tax of 45% on incomes over $180,000 and a 33% corporate tax rate. Those with a salary under $125,000 would be granted a tax free threshold of $10,000. The party stated this would result in "tax cuts of between $16 and $26 a week for 3.7 million New Zealanders" and anyone earning under $125,000 would pay less tax as part of its plan.

In the 2023 general election, the Green Party's share of the party vote rose to 11.6% and it increased its number of seats by six to 15: three electorates and 12 list MPs. This is the highest number of Green MPs to ever be elected into Parliament thus far. The party returned to opposition, as support partner Labour came second to National.

=== In opposition (2023–present) ===
In January 2024 Shaw announced that he would be resigning as co-leader of the Green Party and retiring from politics. Amid shoplifting allegations, Golriz Ghahraman resigned in January 2024. She was replaced by Celia Wade-Brown. On 21 February 2024, Fa'anānā Efeso Collins died during a charity run in Auckland. He was replaced by Lawrence Xu-Nan. On 15 March 2024, Darleen Tana was stood down after allegations of migrant exploitation. On 6 May 2024, James Shaw resigned from parliament and was replaced by Francisco Hernandez. In late September 2024, Swarbrick announced that the Greens would hold a special meeting on 17 October to decide whether to expel Tana from Parliament using the waka-jumping legislation. In mid-October, Tana appealed the High Court ruling upholding the Green Party's proceedings to expel her from Parliament. In response, Swarbrick said that the appeal would not affect the special meeting scheduled for 17 October. At that meeting 185 party delegates voted to support the use of the legislation by an overwhelming consensus. On 22 October, House Speaker Gerry Brownlee revoked Tana's ability to attend Parliament and expelled her using the Electoral (Integrity) Amendment Act 2018. She ceased to be an MP immediately following this announcement. In response to the ruling, Tana maintained her innocence but said she respected the speaker's decision due to the waka-jumping law. Benjamin Doyle entered Parliament in November 2024 following the removal of Darleen Tana.

In early November 2024, the Greens' Copyright (Parody and Satire) Amendment Bill, which proposed allowing copyrighted works to be used for parody, satire and memes, was pulled from Parliament's ballot. On 20 November, Green MP Teanau Tuiono's member's bill restoring New Zealand citizenship to people born in Western Samoa between 1924 and 1949 passed into law with unanimous support from all parties.

In early May 2025, Swarbrick unveiled the Greens' alternative budget, which proposed investing $8 billion over the next four years in various green policies including creating a Ministry of Green Works and supporting sustainable infrastructure. Other key Green Budget policies have included a new wealth tax, higher corporate taxes, a private jet tax, higher mining royalties and income tax rates. In response, the ACT party described the Green Budget as a "reckless attack on family farming" while Prime Minister Luxon described the alternative budget as "clown show economics." On 18 May, Swarbrick defended the Green Budget as during an interview with TVNZ journalist Jack Tame, saying that it had been "independently costed."

In mid July 2025, the Greens' supported the National-led coalition government's proposed online casino legislation during its first reading, which would introduce 15 licenses for online casinos operating in New Zealand. On 5 September 2025, Benjamin Doyle announced they would resign from Parliament, effective 3 October, citing safety concerns. Mike Davidson would enter Parliament to fill the vacancy. In mid November 2025, co-leader Davidson announced that a Green government would revoke coal, gold and seabed mining consents approved under the National-led coalition government's Fast-track Approvals Act 2024.

In response to fuel shortages in March 2026 caused by the 2026 Iran war, the Green Party offered to support the National-led coalition government's crisis-relief package in Parliament if the government agreed to subsidise free public transportation, transport relief payments for low income earners and rural residents, increase mileage rates for care and support workers and reverse cuts to school bus funding and the Total Mobility Scheme. On 24 March, the Government announced its NZ$373 million relief package which consisted of a $50 in-work tax credit for 143,000 working families with children from 7 April, and a lower tax credit for another 14,000 families will also be eligible. While beneficiaries and pensioners would be ineligible for the tax credit, their payments would be adjusted from 1 April per procedure. In response, Swarbrick described the tax credits as insufficient for helping low income groups and said it favoured fossil fuels over public transportation.

== Ideology ==
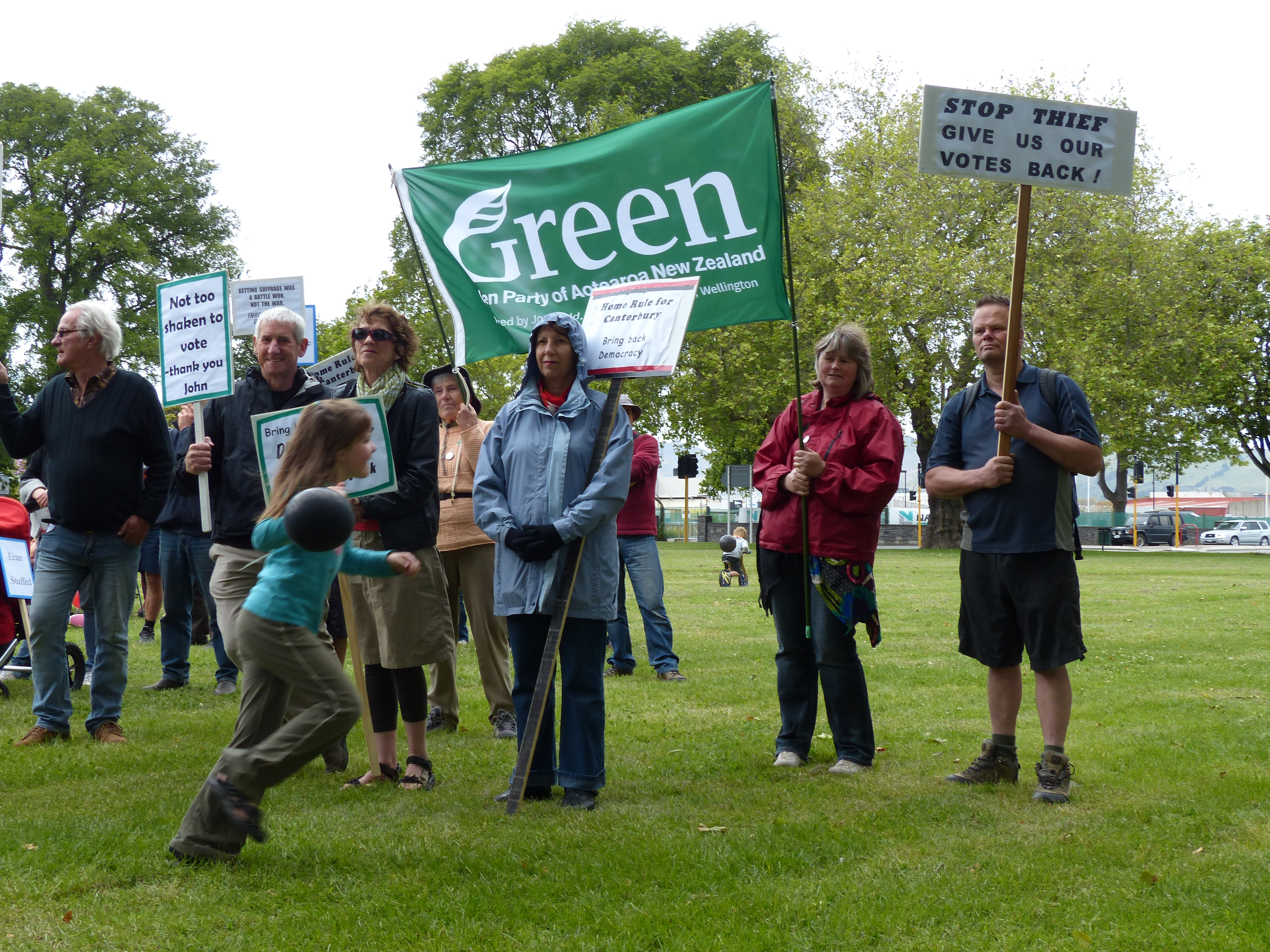
Green Party supporters attending a demonstration in Christchurch on 1 December 2012

=== Green Party Charter ===
The party has four pillars like many green parties around the world; ecological wisdom, social justice, grassroots democracy, and nonviolence. Internationally, it is affiliated with the Global Greens whose common charter includes these. The party accepts the Treaty of Waitangi as the founding document of New Zealand and recognises Māori as tangata whenua ('people of the land').

These charter principles have been read by most Greens as a connected programme, despite media and commentary suggesting an inherent tension between a focus on environmental and social issues. For example, Nandor Tanzcos stated, "anyone who says that the Green party should stick to the environment fundamentally fails to understand what Green politics is by its very nature. The Greens aren't the 'environment party', they're the Green party," and that "Green politics has never been about preserving the environment, it's always been about the relationships we have with each other and the rest of life on this planet."

The Greens have relied heavily on the well-educated, urban demographic for their voter base. Green voters have various priorities but are likely to have a high regard for the environment and environmental issues. However, research indicates very few people who vote Green do so purely for environmental concerns.

The charter has been open to various ideological interpretations with MPs such as Sue Bradford and Keith Locke, high profile former candidate and staffer Jack McDonald believing this necessitates a eco-socialist vision, whereas others have argued it specifically excludes this. 2026 candidate Mike Finlayson describes himself as an ecosocialist. In a 2012 book Beyond Tomorrow: A Values Story, the author Claire Browning said the book "says one thing some members won’t like. The Greens are an ecological economic party, a party that puts the environment first, not a party of the Left – and a party that implicitly, in its first charter principle, stands for diversity and inclusion." Candidate Vernon Tava, and MP Kennedy Graham, agreed with this view.

==== Environment ====
The Greens have campaigned on a number of issues over time such as mining of national parks, fresh water, peak oil and the release of genetically engineered organisms. The party strongly supports efforts to address climate change based on scientific evidence, by transitioning away from the burning of fossil fuels to renewable energy production, as well as making carbon pricing more transparent and bringing the agricultural sector into the Emissions Trading Scheme.

==== Foreign policy ====
There have been four spokespeople Keith Locke, Kennedy Graham, Golriz Ghaharaman and currently Teanau Tuiono. Historically sympathetic in principle to national liberation, self-determination movements. This was used to justify allowing Ukrainian president to address parliament in 2022, breaking with protocol which Greens had previously objected to, with leader Marama Davidson saying she would like other oppressed nations to speak but never raised this formally. Historically a critic of the size and role of military, although unclear whether they want civilian functions like search and rescue to be carried out by military or non-military. Greens supported the Defence Capability Upgrade plan in 2019.

Greens only persistent critics in parliament of deployment of special forces to Afghanistan which began in 2001, as well as Iraq training missions following invasion of Iraq in 2003 however during period of government in 2017 – 2020 Greens offered minimal or no opposition to deployments, an extension of all deployments for six months (late 2017) was not commented on, their extension a year later (2018) limited to a press release on the day of their announcement and asking about their future extension in parliament. Greens claimed that the withdrawal of Iraq training mission was a success of theirs but Winston Peters denied they had anything to do with the decision. In 2026 a former NZSAS soldier Josh Jacbson standing on the Green Party list was featured prominently in the media. Jacobson served in Afghanistan and has not revealed any details such as whether he served in Operation Burnham, stating only "We were there doing work that mattered."

The Green Party has spoken out in support of human rights and against military operations conducted by the United States and other countries in Afghanistan and Iraq. The party has also expressed sympathy for the Palestinians and criticised the Israeli occupation of the Palestinian Territories.

==== Social issues ====
The party is also known for its advocacy on numerous social issues, such as the legalisation of marriage equality, the right to seek asylum and increasing the refugee quota, and gender equality.

==== Indigenous rights ====
The party accepts Te Tiriti o Waitangi (the Māori language version of the treaty) as the founding document of New Zealand and recognises Māori as tangata whenua. The party has expressed misgivings about treaty settlement process, including the government's imposition of 'large natural groupings' concept on Hapū. For example Metiria Turei stated they "gave very serious consideration to abstaining" on the Ngati Ruanui Claims Settlement Bill in 2003. The Greens have rejected calls to make treaty settlements full and final and see the treaty as a living document. Green Party have had an unclear position regarding the legitimacy of iwi authorities as representatives of mana whenua, and whether to oppose policies pursued by iwi authorities which contradict green values — for example at Ihumātao, Shelley Bay (where Green Councillors voted with iwi authority representatives despite opposition within the iwi authority membership to turn public land into commercial housing), and the Ngati Paoa settlement (where a settlement would privatise a public reserve).

==== Economics ====
The Green Party's economic position has shifted over time, being once supportive of a number of unorthodox positions to becoming increasingly mainstream. Once openly skepticial of 'economic growth', the party has shifted to embrace 'green growth' under Russel Norman who also described the Greens as "pro-market" (including the championing of business lobby group Pure Advantage and taking donations from some of its members). The focus on 'green growth' continued under James Shaw who also sought to burnish the Green Party's fiscal responsibility by introducing the Budget Responsibility Rules ahead of the 2017 election. In response to the Greens new fiscal plan announcement in 2025 some commentators have said they have made a 'dramatic break', others have suggested move towards a 'economic populist' framework in their 2026 election campaign.

In its economic policies, the Green Party stresses factors such as sustainability, taxing the indirect costs of pollution, and fair trade. It also states that measuring economic success should concentrate on measuring well-being rather than analysing economic indicators. The party wants the eventual introduction of a universal basic income.

==== Genetically modified organisms ====
While the moratorium on genetic modification has now expired, the Greens remain heavily involved in attempts to prevent any GM releases under the new regulatory framework, and genetic engineering remains a major topic for the party.

==== Drug law reform ====
Drug law reform was previously a major focus of the media when discussing the Greens, particular when Rastafarian Green MP Nandor Tanzcos who was the spokesperson. Undue attention lead him to drop the portfolio. At that time Green policy was decriminalise use but has shifted to advocating for legalisation under Julie Anne Genter. In the 2017–2020 term of the Sixth Labour Government, medicinal cannabis was legalised, but legalisation of recreational cannabis use was rejected in a 2020 referendum.

==== Academic views ====
The party's ideology combines environmentalism with social democratic economic policies, including well-funded and locally controlled public services within the confines of a steady-state economy. The Green Party was founded to counter what it sees as threats to the natural environment. Environmental issues remain its main focus.

== Organisation and structure ==
The party adopted a new constitution in 2022, named Te Waka Framework. This is a Te Tiriti-based structure that is derived from the party's charter and commitment to Te Tiriti o Waitangi. The framework contains four sections: Te Waka, Ngā Haumi, Te Hāpai, and Ngā Tumu, and is based on the journey of a waka.

Te Waka	Te Waka covers the governance and policy development and includes areas such as Kaunihera (Council), Te Rōpū Pounamu, Policy Hub, and Kaumātua Kākāriki.
Ngā Haumi	Ngā Haumi are the administration and operation aspects of the party and covers the party office.
Te Hāpai	Te Hāpai covers membership engagement and representation. It is instructed by and answerable to the membership and includes provinces, branches, and networks. One of the decision making bodies of the party, Member Assembly, also falls under Te Hāpai, as well as Te Awa, the party's magazine.
Ngā Tumu	Ngā Tumu are the leaders of the party and include both parliamentary caucus and local government caucus.

=== Provinces and branches ===
A province is a collection of branches which has sufficient sense of common identity defined by natural geographical boundaries. Branches are a collection of members with an electorate-based geographical area of responsibility.

=== Networks ===
There are a number of identity or interest-based networks across the party. These include:

- Degrowth Greens
- Green Women (a network for women members)
- Inclusive Greens (a network for members living with a disability)
- Pasifika Greens (a network for members with Pasifika ancestry)
- Rainbow Greens (a network for LGBTQIA+ members)
- Rural Greens (a network for members with interests in rural and agricultural issues)
- GreenLeft (a network for left-wing, anti-capitalist members)
- Te Roopu Pounamu (a Māori network)
- Union Greens (representing trade unions)
- Young Greens

== General election results ==
=== National ===
Election	Co-leaders		Votes	%	Seats	+/–	Position	Status
1990	—N/a		124,915	6.9%	0 / 97	Steady	▲3rd	No seats
1993	—N/a		350,063 (Note: As part of the Alliance political party group.)	18.2%	0 / 99	Steady	3rd	No seats
1996	Rod Donald	Jeanette Fitzsimons	209,347	10.1%	3 / 120	▲3	▼4th	Opposition
1999	Rod Donald	Jeanette Fitzsimons	106,560	5.1%	7 / 120	▲4	▲5th	Confidence and supply
2002	Rod Donald	Jeanette Fitzsimons	142,250	7.0%	9 / 120	▲2	5th	Cooperation agreement
2005	Rod Donald	Jeanette Fitzsimons	120,521	5.3%	6 / 121	▼3	▼4th	Cooperation agreement
2008	Russel Norman	Jeanette Fitzsimons	157,613	6.7%	9 / 122	▲3	▲3rd	Opposition
2011	Russel Norman	Metiria Turei	247,372	11.0%	14 / 121	▲5	3rd	Opposition
2014	Russel Norman	Metiria Turei	257,356	10.7%	14 / 121	Steady	3rd	Opposition
2017	James Shaw	—N/a	162,443	6.2%	8 / 120	▼6	▼4th	Confidence and supply
2020	James Shaw	Marama Davidson	226,754	7.8%	10 / 120	▲2	▲3rd	Cooperation agreement
2023	James Shaw	Marama Davidson	330,883	11.6%	15 / 123	▲5	3rd	Opposition
2026	Chlöe Swarbrick	Marama Davidson	TBD	TBD	16 / 131	▲1	3rd	TBD
Source: Electoral Commission

== Local government ==
=== Campaigns ===
==== 2013 ====
In the 2013 local elections, the Greens won three city council and two regional council seats in Wellington, a council seat in Dunedin, and also enjoyed success in Christchurch and Gisborne.

==== 2016 ====
During the 2016 local elections, Green Dunedin candidate Aaron Hawkins was re-elected to the Dunedin City Council and was joined by the Green Party's first successful local or parliamentary Pasifika candidate, Councillor Marie Laufiso. During the 2016 Wellington local election, four Green candidates Sue Kedgley, Iona Pannett, Sarah Free, and David Lee were elected onto the Greater Wellington Regional Council and the Lambton, Eastern, and Southern Wards of the Wellington City Council. Several Green candidates also contested seats on the Auckland Council, local boards, and licensing trusts during the 2016 Auckland local body elections.

In addition, Brent Barrett was elected to Palmerston North City Council.

==== 2019 ====
The 2019 New Zealand local elections were the most successful local body elections ever for the party, culminating in 42 successful candidates. Notably, Aaron Hawkins was elected Mayor of Dunedin, becoming the first Green Party candidate to ever win a mayoralty in New Zealand.

In addition, Brent Barrett was re-elected to the Palmerston North City Council and was joined by a second Green candidate Renee Dingwall. Future Green MP Teanau Tuiono also ran for the position of Mayor of Palmerston North but was defeated by the incumbent Grant Smith.

==== 2022 ====
During the 2022 New Zealand local elections, ten Green branded candidates were elected to local government positions. Though Aaron Hawkins was defeated in his bid to be re-elected as Mayor of Dunedin, the Green-endorsed Tory Whanau was elected as Mayor of Wellington.

Green councillor Tamatha Paul was elected to the Wellington City Council (WCC) and became the chair of its new environment and infrastructure committee. In addition, Laurie Foon and Nīkau Wi Neera were elected to the WCC's Southern General Ward and Te Whanganui-a-Tara Māori ward.

In addition, Yadana Saw, Thomas Nash, and Quentin Duthie were elected on the Green Party ticket to the Greater Wellington Regional Council.

Green councillor Brent Barrett was re-elected for a third term on the Palmerston North City Council (PNCC). In addition, Kaydee Zabelin was elected to the PNCC on the Green ticket.

In Otago, Marie Laufiso was elected to the Dunedin City Council as a councillor. In addition, Alan Somerville was elected to the Dunedin Regional Constituency of the Otago Regional Council. In July 2024, Laufiso resigned from the party over the ousting of Tana, becoming an independent city councillor.

==== 2024 Wellington by-election ====
In February 2024, Green Party candidate Georgie Rogers was elected to the Pukehīnau/Lambton General Ward in the Wellington City Council. The ward had been vacated by Tamatha Paul, who had been elected to Parliament as a Green MP during the 2023 New Zealand general election.

==== 2025 ====
During the 2025 New Zealand local elections and the local referendums on Māori wards and constituencies, the Greens campaigned on retaining Māori wards and constituencies, sustainability and upholding the Treaty of Waitangi. Mayor of Wellington Tory Whanau pulled out of the 2025 Wellington mayoral election as the Green candidate and instead ran for the Wellington City Council's Māori ward as the Green candidate. Whanau was unsuccessful, losing that race to Labour candidate Matthew Reweti. During the 2025 Wellington City Council election, four Green candidates Jonnie Osborne, Geordie Rogers, Rebecca Matthews (a Labour councillor in the previous term) and Laurie Foon were elected to the council. During the 2025 Greater Wellington Regional Council election, two Green candidates Quentin Duthie and Yadana Saw were elected to the Greater Wellington Regional Council.

During the 2025 Palmerston North City Council election, two Green candidates Brent Barrett and Kaydee Zabelin were re-elected to the Palmerston North City Council. During the 2025 Dunedin City Council election, Green candidate Mike Treadwell was elected to the Dunedin City Council. During the 2025 Otago Regional Council election, Green councillor Alan Somerville was re-elected to the Otago Regional Council.

=== Local electoral history ===
Election	Number of candidates (Note: Green endorsed independents are included in the numbers here when known, although not all endorsements are made public. Green Party members who were not officially endorsed are not included here, nor those who ran under other left-wing tickets such as City Vision or The People's Choice)					Winning candidates				
Election	Mayor	Council	Board	Regional council	Total	Mayor	Council	Board	Regional council	Total
2025	2	22	2	7	33	1 / 2	10 / 22	0 / 2	3 / 7	14 / 33 42.4%

== Leadership ==
The party has six equal status office holders that form their leadership group:

- two co-leaders (one female and one of any gender, one of whom must be Māori)
- two party co-convenors (one female and one of any gender)
- two policy co-convenors (one female and one of any gender)

The co-leaders lead the caucus, the party co-convenors lead the party executive, and the policy co-convenors lead the policy committee. The leadership group facilitates high level discussion and co-ordination between the three committees.

=== Co-leaders ===
Historically, the Green Party had one male and one female as co-leaders, but in May 2022 members voted to require one leader be female and one be Māori. Marama Davidson has been the female co-leader since 2018. Chlöe Swarbrick became co-leader in March 2024, succeeding James Shaw, who had been elected as male co-leader in 2015.

No.	Name	Portrait	Term of office		No.	Name	Portrait	Term of office	
1	Rod Donald		21 May 1995	6 November 2005†	1	Jeanette Fitzsimons		21 May 1995	30 May 2009
2	Russel Norman		3 June 2006	30 May 2015	1	Jeanette Fitzsimons		21 May 1995	30 May 2009
2	Russel Norman		3 June 2006	30 May 2015	2	Metiria Turei		30 May 2009	9 August 2017
3	James Shaw		30 May 2015	10 March 2024	2	Metiria Turei		30 May 2009	9 August 2017
3	James Shaw		30 May 2015	10 March 2024	3	Marama Davidson		8 April 2018	incumbent
4	Chlöe Swarbrick		10 March 2024	incumbent	3	Marama Davidson		8 April 2018	incumbent

=== Co-convenors ===
Equivalent to the organisational president of other parties. Historically, there was always one male co-convenor and one female co-convenor. As of May 2022, the party's new constitution requires one female co-convenor and one co-convenor of any gender.

Male/Any gender	Female
Chris Thomas (1990–1992); Harry Parke (1992–1994); Rex Verity (1994–1997); Joel Cayford (1997–1998); Ian Stephens (1998–2000); Richard Davies (2000–2001); David Clendon (2001–2004); Paul de Spa (2004–2006); Roland Sapsford (2006–2012); Pete Huggins (2012–2014); John Ranta (2014–2018); Wiremu Winitana (2018–2022); Sam Ferguson (2022); Rо̄pata Moore (2022–2023); Lawrence Xu-Nan (2023–2024); Sam Ferguson (2024–present)	Meg Collins (1990–1992); Dianna Mellor (1992–1994); Danna Glendining (1994–1997); Leah McBey (1997–1998); Christine Dann (1998–2000); Marg O'Brien (2000–2002); Catherine Delahunty (2002–2004); Karen Davis (2004–2007); Moea Armstrong (2007–2010); Georgina Morrison (2010–2015); Debs Martin (2015–2017); Katy Watabe (2017–2019); Penny Leach (2019–2022); Aroha Lowe (2022–2023); Alyssce Te Huna (2023–2025); Bridget Allan (2025–present)

=== Policy co-convenors ===
Policy co-convenors are the leaders of the policy committee, which is autonomous from both the caucus and the party executive. While lower in public profile than the party co-convenors, the policy co-convenors are considered to have the same status as the party co-convenors, and are elected in the same way. As of May 2022, the party's new constitution requires one female policy co-convenor and one policy co-convenor of any gender.

Male/Any gender	Female
Matthew Grant (2001–2004); Bill Brislen (2004–2005); Ivan Sowry (2005–2009); Richard Leckinger (2009–2013); Paul Bailey (2013–2016); Barry Coates (2016); Julian Lumbreras (2017–2018); Jack McDonald (2018–2019); Leighton Thompson (2019–2020); Lawrence Xu-Nan (2020–2023); Alika Wells (2023–2025); Sally Faisandier (2026–present)	Karen Davis (2001–2004); Nancy Higgins (2004–2007); Caroline Glass (2007–2012); Jeanette Elley (2012–2014); Wendy Harper (2014–2016); Caroline Glass (2016–2022); Alyssce Te Huna (2022–2023); Vicky Edwards (2023–present)

== See also ==
- List of Green Party of Aotearoa New Zealand MPs
- List of green political parties
- Politics of New Zealand
