= Marama Davidson =

New Zealand politician (born 1973)

The Honourable Marama Davidson MP
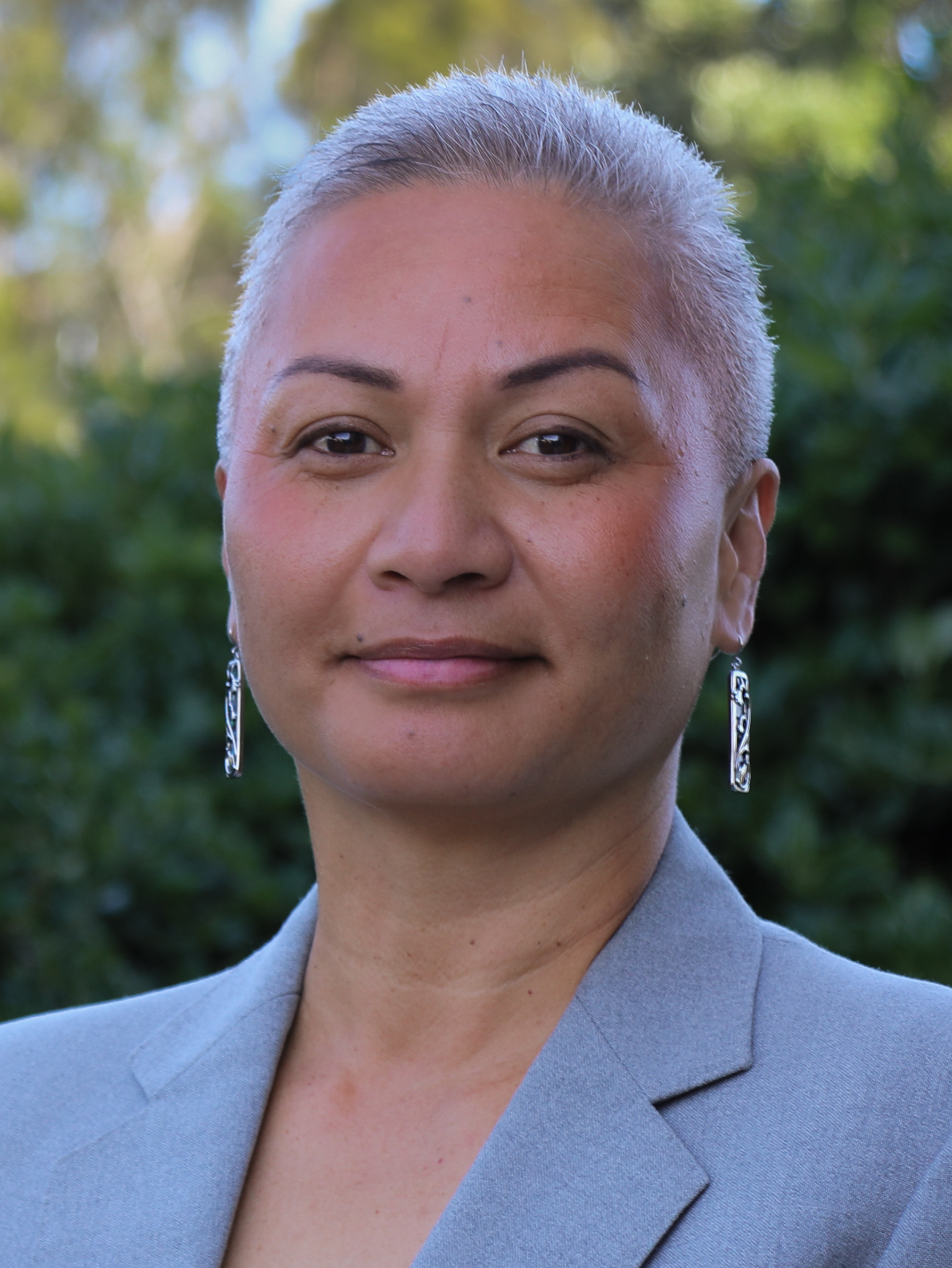
- Davidson in 2026

1st Minister for the Prevention of Family and Sexual Violence
- In office 6 November 2020 – 27 November 2023
- Prime Minister: Jacinda Ardern; Chris Hipkins
- Preceded by: Position established
- Succeeded by: Karen Chhour

6th Co-leader of the Green Party
- Incumbent
- Assumed office 8 April 2018 Co-leader with James Shaw, then Chlöe Swarbrick
- Preceded by: Metiria Turei

Member of the New Zealand Parliament for Green party list
- Incumbent
- Assumed office 4 November 2015
- Preceded by: Russel Norman

Personal details
- Born: Marama Mere-Ana Paratene; 29 December 1973 (age 52) Auckland, New Zealand
- Party: Green
- Spouse: Paul Davidson
- Relations: Rawiri Paratene (father)
- Children: 6
- Website: Green Party profile
- Davidson's voice Davidson introducing herself, recorded October 2016

Marama Mere-Ana Davidson (née Paratene; born 29 December 1973) is a New Zealand politician who has served as a co-leader of the Green Party of Aotearoa New Zealand since 2018.

Davidson entered the New Zealand Parliament in 2015 as a Green Party list MP. She was elected female co-leader in April 2018. (Note: At the time the Green Party required the co-leadership be shared by one woman and one man.) She served alongside James Shaw until 2024, and subsequently with Chlöe Swarbrick.

In October 2020, the Green Party signed a cooperation agreement to support a Labour-led government. Davidson became the Minister outside Cabinet for the Prevention of Family and Sexual Violence, as well as holding the Associate Housing portfolio.

== Early life and education ==
Davidson was born in Auckland and is of Ngāti Porou, Te Rarawa, and Ngāpuhi descent. Her father is the actor Rawiri Paratene. Both her parents were Māori language campaigners in the 1970s. During her youth, the family moved a lot; Davidson started school in Wellington, but subsequently lived in Dunedin and Christchurch. At age nine, her family moved to Whirinaki in the Hokianga, where she spent the rest of her childhood. She started her degree in Hamilton and finished it in Auckland, from where she graduated with a Bachelor of Arts. She also holds a Graduate Diploma in International Diplomacy for Indigenous Studies through Te Whare Wānanga o Awanuiārangi.

== Professional career and community engagement ==
Davidson worked for the Human Rights Commission from 2003 to 2012. She has worked part-time for Breastfeeding New Zealand. She was a 'Think Tank Member' for the Owen Glenn Inquiry on Child Abuse and Domestic Violence. She is a founding member of Te Wharepora Hou Māori Women's Collective.

== Political career ==
New Zealand Parliament
Years	Term	Electorate	List	Party
2015–2017	51st	List	15	Green
2017–2020	52nd	List	2	Green
2020–2023	53rd	List	1	Green
2023–2026	54th	List	1	Green
2026–present	55th	List	1	Green

=== Fifth National Government, 2013–2017 ===
Davidson is an environmentalist and human rights advocate. In June 2013 she stood for the Green Party in the Ikaroa-Rāwhiti by-election, where she came fourth with 11.15% of the vote.

At the 2014 election she stood in the Tāmaki Makaurau electorate. She was ranked 15th on the Green party list and entered Parliament in 2015 with the resignation of Russel Norman.

Davidson has called for liberalisation of abortion law, in addition to better sex education, improved access to contraception, and more support for adoption, having had an abortion as a teenager.

During the 2017 general election, Davidson was ranked second in the Green Party's final candidate list in April 2017. Following the release of the full election results on 7 October, Davidson was reinstated as a list Member of Parliament. The Green Party won 6.3 percent of the votes and eight seats.

=== Sixth Labour Government, 2017–2023 ===
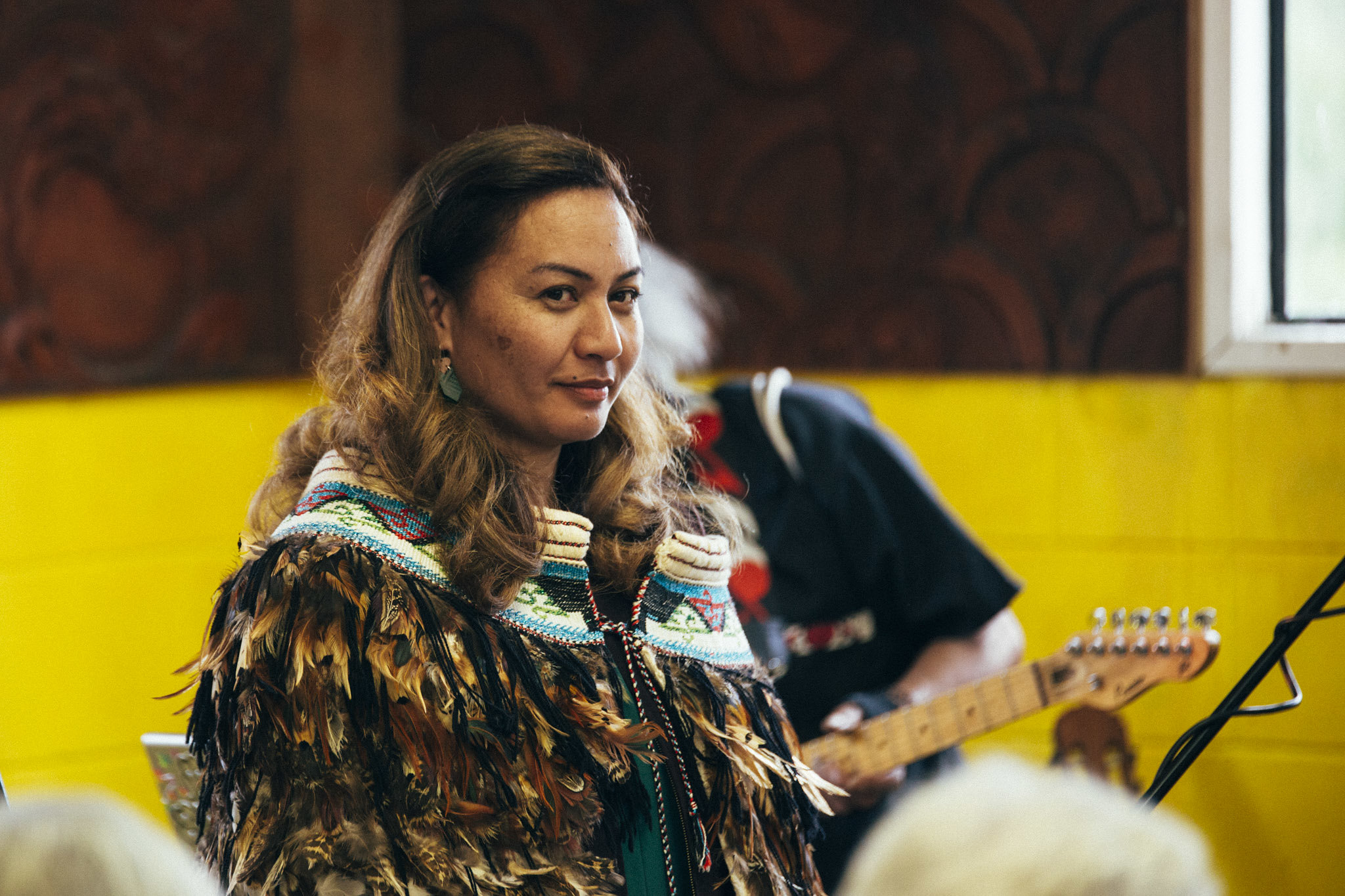
Davidson at her marae, Matai Ara Nui Marae in Whirinaki, following her election as co-leader in 2018

Following the resignation of Metiria Turei as co-leader of the Green Party in 2017, Davidson was poised as a possible contender for the co-leadership. On 4 February 2018, Davidson officially announced her candidacy for co-leader, and on 8 April won the female co-leadership election, defeating fellow MP Julie Anne Genter who also contested the position. After summing the co-leadership of the Greens, Davidson stated that the Greens' responsibility was to push the Labour-led coalition government in a progressive direction including the abolition of letting fees on rental homes.

On 8 July 2018, Davidson reported that she had received rape and death threats against her and her children on social media after tweeting support for the Mayor of Auckland Phil Goff's decision to ban two Canadian far right speakers Lauren Southern and Stefan Molyneux from Auckland Council facilities as part of a speaking tour in August 2018.

In response to this, Davidson stated during an anti-racism rally, attended by families with children, that New Zealand needs to reclaim the word "cunt" and that the word shouldn't be used as abuse.

In 25 March 2020, Davidson became a member of the Epidemic Response Committee, a select committee that considered the government's response to the COVID-19 pandemic.

During the 2020 general election on 17 October, Davidson was re-elected to Parliament on the party list. Davidson also contested Tāmaki Makaurau, coming third place behind Labour incumbent Peeni Henare and the Māori Party's candidate John Tamihere. The Green Party captured 7.9% of the popular vote (226,754).

Following prolonged negotiations between the Greens and Labour which concluded in a "cooperation" agreement on 31 October 2020, Davidson was designated as the Minister for the Prevention of Family and Sexual Violence and also became Associate Minister of Housing with responsibility for homelessness.

Davidson was challenged in May 2021 by the National and Act parties for attending and speaking at a Mongrel Mob gathering at the Waikato Chapters headquarters in Hamilton. Davidson attended the gathering with fellow Green MP Elizabeth Kerekere and the Human Rights Commissioner Paul Hunt. The gathering discussed human rights, justice and racism and Davidson defended attending and speaking at the gathering saying in a tweet that it was a "fabulous community event for justice". Davidson also defended attending the gathering saying that it is vital that a range of communities are engaged with and tweeting that gangs were part of the "diverse communities, who have been subject to enduring and systemic racism".

While canvassing at a counterprotest against Kellie-Jay Keen-Minshull's planned speech in Albert Park in March 2023, Davidson stated during an encounter with Counterspin Media host Hannah Spierer, "I am a prevention violence minister, and I know who causes violence in the world. It is white cis men, that is white cis men who cause violence in the world". She was later criticised for this remark by ACT Party leader David Seymour, National Party leader Christopher Luxon, and New Zealand First leader Winston Peters, who called on her to resign from her ministerial portfolio. The comment was made after she was struck by a passing motorcyclist who was part of a support group of Destiny Church pastor Brian Tamaki. She did not require medical attention at the time, and filed a police report at the scene. She later spoke without mentioning the incident. Prime Minister Chris Hipkins disagreed with her choice of words but stated that he understood the context she had make the remarks following the motorcycle and Counterspin incidents. Her message received support from Te Pāti Māori co-leaders Debbie Ngarewa-Packer and Rawiri Waititi, who accused white men of asking her to apologise for her lived experience after having been assaulted.

On 20 June, Davidson was ejected from House proceedings after claiming that ACT MPs were promoting racism through their line of questioning during a debate about national health service Te Whatu Ora's new "Equity Adjustor Score." Several ACT MPs including Karen Chhour and James McDowall claimed that the Equity Adjustor Score favoured Māori and Pasifika patients over other ethnic groups. In response, Davidson stated that "the nature of these questions are absolutely intended to raise racist opinions amongst the New Zealand public." Speaker Adrian Rurawhe rebuked Davidson for making accusations of racism and ordered her to apologise. Dissatisfied with her apology, Rurawhe ordered Davidson to leave the House. Te Pāti Māori co-leader Ngarewa-Packer defended Davidson, claiming that the opposition parties were engaged in race-baiting against Māori.

=== Sixth National Government, 2023–present ===
The Green Party increased their Members of Parliament from nine after the 2020 election to fifteen after the 2023 New Zealand general election, including Davidson. This was the party's best election result ever. However, a right-wing coalition government was formed, and the Greens joined the opposition. After official results were released, Davidson said the party would "lead the ongoing fight to eliminate poverty, honour Te Tiriti, protect nature, and build a climate-resilient future for our mokopuna".

In late November 2023, Davidson assumed the Green Party's conservation, child poverty reduction, prevention of family violence and sexual violence, and social investment spokesperson portfolios.

On 5 December 2023, Davidson was granted retention of the title The Honourable, in recognition of her term as a member of the Executive Council.

In February 2024, Davidson introduced the Consumer Guarantees (Right to Repair) Amendment Bill, which would compel manufacturers to ensure that repair facilities and spare parts for their products are available in New Zealand. The bill passed its first reading in Parliament on 19 February 2025 with the support of the Green, Labour, Māori and New Zealand First parties. During the select committee phase, NZ First withdrew its support, meaning that Davidson did not have enough support to progress her member's bill further. On 22 October 2025, Davidson's Right to Repair bill was discharged after she arrived 20 seconds late to the debating chamber for its second reading. Consequently, Assistant Speaker Maureen Pugh discharged the bill from Parliament's agenda. Davidson later attempted to have the bill reinstated into Parliament's business agenda but was blocked by Government MPs. Davidson subsequently apologised to the bill's supporters for missing her speaking slot.

During the 2026 New Zealand general election, Davidson was ranked first on the Green Party list. On 7 November, Davidson was re-elected to Parliament via the party list.

== Political views and positions ==
=== Feminism ===
Marama Davidson has a feminism rooted in mana wāhine, standing as a Māori woman first and foremost. She has been inspired by her grandmother, Patricia Broughton nee Hancy, American poet and activist Maya Angelou, and fellow Aotearoa / New Zealand Māori women leaders Metiria Turei, Eva Rickard, Titewhai Harawira, Te Puea Hērangi, Dr Leonie Pihema, Sina Brown Davis and Professor Mera Penehira.

Marama Davidson became the first wāhine Māori / Māori woman to speak at the Oxford Union Debate. As part of the winning team, she opposed the notion "This House believes the sun should never have set on the British Empire", referencing her grandmother, Patricia Charlotte, who had been "beaten in colonial schools for speaking the only language she knew".

Marama Davidson advocates transforming the economy to align with nature and community needs, saying that there is a connection of a patriarchal world to the exploitation of the environment and communities.She believes that "being a woman" means embracing one's feminine strength and spirit and connecting to Papatūānuku, with that feminine spirit not limited to cis-women.

=== Te Tiriti o Waitangi ===
Marama Davidson describes Te Tiriti o Waitangi as a basis for unity, and for collective care for nature and people, which recognises the unique status of iwi and hapū.

=== Donald Trump ===
On 5 June 2020, Davidson and fellow Greens Co-Leader James Shaw described United States President Donald Trump as a racist in response to a question fielded by press gallery journalists following the protests triggered by the murder of George Floyd in late May.

=== Israel-Palestine ===
In October 2016, Davidson took part in the Women's Boat to Gaza, which intended to highlight the Israeli blockade of the Gaza Strip. Other passengers aboard included the Nobel Peace Prize laureate Mairead Maguire and retired US Army colonel Ann Wright. On 5 October, the Women's Peace Flotilla's ship Zaytouna Oliva was intercepted by the Israeli Navy. In response to the boarding of the Women's Peace Flotilla, Green Party co-leader Metiria Turei called on the Israeli authorities to release Davidson and other activists, and to end the blockade of Gaza.

On 11 May 2021, she and 16 other New Zealand Members of Parliament donned keffiyeh to mark World Keffiyeh Day.

In September 2025, Davidson called the situation in Gaza a genocide and said that New Zealand should officially recognise it and take steps to prevent it.

== Personal life and family ==
Marama Davidson is married to Paul Davidson, with whom she has six children; their last child was born in 2008. Davidson is a qualified aerobics instructor and used to teach part-time classes at Les Mills International in order to support her children and university studies.

In late June 2018, Davidson disclosed that she had been sexually abused as an eight-year-old child by a distant relative during a Speaking Secrets podcast, a co-production by The New Zealand Herald and Newstalk ZB. During the New Zealand Parliament's formal apology to homosexual men convicted of consensual acts before the passage of the Homosexual Law Reform Act in 1986, Davidson acknowledged that her uncle had assaulted a gay man after reacting badly to his proposition. Her uncle was subsequently convicted of manslaughter and imprisoned when the victim fell into Wellington Harbour and drowned. Davidson apologised on behalf of her late uncle to the LGBT community in New Zealand.

On 17 June 2024, Davidson announced that she had been diagnosed with breast cancer and would undergo a partial mastectomy. Davidson returned to politics on 3 February 2025 at Waitangi, ahead of Waitangi Day 2025.

== Notes ==
Party political offices
Preceded by Metiria Turei	Female co-leader of the Green Party; 2018–present Served alongside: James Shaw	Incumbent
