= Simpson Grierson =

New Zealand commercial law firm

- Headquarters: Auckland
- No. of offices: 3
- No. of employees: 350+
- Major practice areas: General Practice
- Key people: Phillipa Muir (Chair), Mathew Taylor (Chief Operating Officer)
- Date founded: 1887
- Website: www.simpsongrierson.com

Simpson Grierson is a New Zealand commercial law firm founded in 1887; it is ranked in the top legal firms in that country, and the largest by headcount. The firm is a partnership comprising 45 partners and consultants supported by around 175 lawyers and legal executives in nine practice groups (Banking & Finance, Corporate and Commercial, Construction, Employment, IP/ICT, Litigation, Planning and Environment, Pro Bono and Real Estate). The legal staff are supported by around 100 business services staff (legal administrators, information technology, researchers, finance, people and culture and marketing). It has offices in New Zealand's three largest metropolitan areas Auckland, Wellington and Christchurch.

== Practice areas ==
The firm practises all aspects of commercial law, including banking and finance, corporate law, corporate insolvency and restructuring, marketing, advertising, mergers and acquisitions, property law, taxation law, energy and utilities law (including upstream oil and gas and electricity), and employment law. It is one of New Zealand's leading law firms in the interpretation of the Resource Management Act 1991 and is one of New Zealand's leading public law firms, especially in relation to local government, where it advises nearly two thirds of New Zealand's local authorities, and news media. A significant litigation and dispute resolution practice also exists.

== History ==
The firm's history can be traced back to 1887 when Butler White & Hanna was established in Auckland, specialising initially in maritime law and insurance law, but adding local government law in the 1930s. In 1921 Grierson Jackson was founded followed two years later in 1923, by the founding of Simpson Coates & Clapshaw. In 1982 Grierson Jackson merged with Bruce Bornholdt's practice to form Grierson Bornholdt, acquiring a Wellington presence. The following year, 1983, saw Grierson Bornholdt and Simpson Coates & Clapshaw merge to create Simpson Grierson. Specialist fields include company law, commercial law, arbitration and construction and energy law. In 1985, Simpson Grierson and Butler White & Hanna merge to create Simpson Grierson Butler White. In 1991 the firm was joined by a number of partners from the former Brandon Brookfield, Wellington and in 1995, the firm adopted Simpson Grierson as its permanent name. Its Christchurch office was opened in 2007.

== Affiliations ==
The firm is the sole New Zealand member of Lex Mundi, an alliance of 161 major law firms (including Australia's Clayton Utz).

== See also ==
- Bell Gully
