= Russel Norman =

New Zealand politician

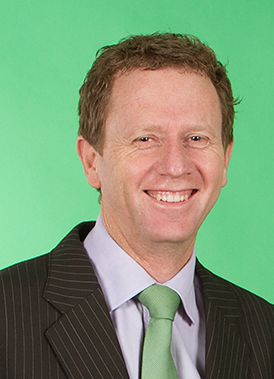

3rd Co-leader of the Green Party
- In office 3 June 2006 – 30 May 2015 Co-leading with Jeanette Fitzsimons, then Metiria Turei
- Preceded by: Rod Donald
- Succeeded by: James Shaw

Member of the New Zealand Parliament for Green Party List
- In office 27 June 2008 – 30 October 2015
- Preceded by: Nándor Tánczos (Note: Normally, list MPs do not have individual predecessors or successors, but Tánczos resigned during a sitting parliament and therefore was succeeded by Norman, who later resigned himself and was succeeded by Davidson.)
- Succeeded by: Marama Davidson

Personal details
- Born: Russel William Norman; 2 June 1967 (age 59) Brisbane, Australia
- Party: Green Party
- Other political affiliations: Democratic Socialist (Australia)
- Domestic partner: Katya Paquin
- Children: 3
- Occupation: Politician and Environmental Campaigner

Russel William Norman (born 2 June 1967) is a New Zealand politician and environmentalist. He was a Member of Parliament and co-leader of the Green Party. Norman resigned as an MP in October 2015 to work as Executive Director of Greenpeace Aotearoa New Zealand.

== Early life ==
Norman was born in Brisbane, Australia, and worked a number of unskilled roles after dropping out of medical school. As a student in Queensland, his first ever vote in 1986 was motivated by the desire to oust the Premier of Queensland at the time, Sir Joh Bjelke-Petersen. Whilst living in Australia, Norman was involved with the Democratic Socialist Party for several years, and contested the House of Representatives for the party at the 1990 federal election, placing fifth of five candidates in the seat of Griffith.

Norman moved to New Zealand in 1997, saying this was to observe the red-green Alliance coalition. He wrote his political science PhD thesis on the Alliance, and was active within the party, editing its party newsletter.

== Involvement in politics ==
In New Zealand Norman became involved in organic farming, and was active in the Auckland branch of the Green Party, helping to set up the Waiheke branch.

Later, he worked as an assistant to Green MPs Sue Kedgley, Nándor Tánczos and Keith Locke. He was a researcher for the party from 2002 to 2004 and was the national campaign manager prior to the 2005 election and the national Party Development Co-ordinator afterwards.

Following the death of Rod Donald, Norman put his name forward as a contender for the male co-leader position. He won the position on 3 June 2006 at the annual meeting, beating Tanczos, David Clendon and former MP Mike Ward in an STV vote by delegates from electorates around the country.

=== Member of Parliament ===
New Zealand Parliament
Years	Term	Electorate	List	Party
2008	48th	List	10	Green
2008–2011	49th	List	2	Green
2011–2014	50th	List	2	Green
2014–2015	51st	List	2	Green

In the 2002 election general election, Norman contested the Rimutaka electorate, where he placed fourth. He was ranked seventeenth on the Green Party list. In the 2005 election, he did not contest an electorate, but was ranked tenth on the Green Party list. On 27 June 2008 Norman was declared elected to parliament when Tanczos resigned after Ward and Catherine Delahunty, who were above Norman on the party list, agreed to stand aside. In the 2008 general election Norman stood in the Rongotai electorate against senior Labour Cabinet Minister Annette King. He placed third in the electorate, but was second on his party's list, and so was returned to parliament.

Norman stood as the Green Party's candidate for the Mount Albert by-election in 2009, following the resignation of Prime Minister Helen Clark. Norman came third with 12.09% of the vote.

In June 2010, Norman claimed he was assaulted by Chinese security staff when he protested against a visiting Chinese delegation of the Vice President Xi Jinping with a Tibetan snow lion flag. Norman lodged a complaint of assault with the New Zealand Police and the Speaker of the House, but police did not find enough evidence to substantiate his claims.

In November 2013 it was announced that Norman would be challenged for the party co-leadership by former Green candidate and Auckland Council policy analyst David Hay. Norman was the first Green co-leader to be openly challenged for the position, stating of Hay "it's an open democratic process, he's entitled to his opinion". Prior to announcing the challenge Hay was informed by the party that he would not be a candidate in the next general election leading to a Green Party spokesperson to say the leadership challenge was "a case of sour grapes". A leadership vote did not eventuate as before the party annual general meeting took place Hay's membership was suspended for one year after an investigation panel found his behaviour breached party rules. Hay admitted breaching the rules after attacking the leadership through via media and leaking internal party documents though also found him to have a genuine grievance for being barred from the candidate pool based on allegations with no evidence. Norman remained leader without being subjected to a delegate vote.

=== Retirement ===
In January 2015, shortly after the birth of his third child, Norman announced he would stand down as co-leader of the Green Party. However, he said he would remain as a Green MP for the foreseeable future. He named what he saw as his key political victories as co-leader as: forcing the Government to reverse its decision to allow mining on Schedule 4 conservation land, and leading a campaign and referendum against National's asset sales programme. Norman was succeeded by James Shaw as co-leader on 30 May 2015. On 11 September 2015, Norman announced that he would resign in October as an MP, and that he would also formally resign from the Green Party, prior to taking on the role of Executive Director of Greenpeace Aotearoa New Zealand. This enabled the next person on the Green Party list, Marama Davidson, to become a member of parliament. In his valedictory speech in Parliament, he spoke about the loss of democracy in New Zealand, and said there were significant problems regarding access to official information.

== Political positions ==
=== Economics ===
In describing his political views Norman said in a 2012 interview that he supports "a market economy with an important role for the state. I am not radically different from an old-style social democrat", stating capitalism was "humanised" between the 1930s and 1950s and "the next challenge is to green it".

=== Socialism ===
Norman stated he was "very wedded to democratic principles and ideals" which is one reason he was turned off socialism although he still shares "a lot of the values of socialism", another was that the socialist movement wasn't taking "sustainability ... seriously enough". Similar comments made in maiden speech to parliament regarding socialism.

=== Foreign policy ===
Norman has stated he is a critic of both the China and US. He replied angrily to 'sloppy journalism' which suggested the Greens had been seduced by the US with meetings with the US embassy and State Department funded trips to the country, "We haven't blunted our approach and we haven't been seduced," citing consistent critique giving the example "It is only the Green Party, for example, that is currently speaking out about the SAS handing over prisoners to be tortured by the US and Afghan forces."

As head of Greenpeace NZ, Norman stated in July 2016 that intended visit of a US warship to NZ — the first in 30 years — would be "an amazing victory for the goal of a nuclear weapons-free world, and an amazing win for us", because "it will be squarely on the nuclear free terms set by New Zealanders 30 years ago". However when the USS Sampson (DDG-102) did visit on November 2016, Prime Minister John Key permitted its entry despite the fact the US continued its policy of neither confirming nor denying the ship was nuclear-powered or armed —the previous basis for a blanket ban on entry of all US vessels. Rather Key made the decision based on officials advice that they were confident that the ship was not nuclear powered or armed.

=== Intelligence and Security ===
Norman criticised the lack of oversight of NZ intelligence agencies, sitting on the Intelligence and Security Committee – which he argued lacked independence (chaired by the minister responsible the PM), lacked power to demand information, amongst other things. Criticised the role and independence of the Inspector of Intelligence and Security – citing the performance of Laurence Greig

== Personal life ==
As of 2011 Norman and his partner, Katya Paquin (sister of Anna Paquin), live with their two sons and a daughter in Hataitai.

In 2012 when Norman and David Shearer shaved their heads for a cancer appeal, he revealed that he had had a melanoma mole removed from his forearm at age 15, leaving a 10 cm scar.

In 2014, Norman was awarded a Bravo award by the New Zealand Skeptics for responding to Steffan Browning's comments on homeopathy stating, "stating that this was not something the Green Party would support as they take 'an evidence based approach'".

== Notes ==
New Zealand Parliament
Preceded by Nándor Tánczos	Member of Parliament for Green Party List; 2008–2015	Succeeded by Marama Davidson
Party political offices
Preceded by Rod Donald	Male co-leader of the Green Party; 2006–2015; Served alongside: Jeanette Fitzsimons, Metiria Turei	Succeeded by James Shaw
