= Olsen (surname) =

Olsen (Danish pronunciation: [ˈoˀlsn̩]) is a Danish-Norwegian patronymic surname meaning "son of Ole". The surname Olesen (pronounced [ˈoːləsn̩]) has a similar origin. The Swedish parallel form is Olsson – "son of Ole". Danish and Norwegian immigrants to English-speaking countries often changed the spelling to Olson in order to accommodate English orthographic rules.

Notable people with the surname include:

== A–K ==
- Aase Olesen (1934–2013), Danish politician
- Andrea Olsen (born 1961), American politician
- Angel Olsen (born 1987), American singer
- Annelise Damm Olesen (born 1942), Danish middle-distance runner
- Anton Olsen (U.S. Navy) (1873–1924), Spanish–American War Medal of Honor recipient
- Arne Olsen (1961/62–2026), Canadian screenwriter
- Ben Olsen (born 1977), American soccer player
- Bjørk Herup Olsen (born 1991), Faroese athlete
- Bjørnar Olsen (born 1958), Norwegian archaeologist
- Brad Olsen (born 1997), New Zealand economist
- Brian Olsen (born 1975), American mixed martial artist
- Carsten Olsen (1891–1974), Danish plant ecologist and physiologist
- Charles Olsen (1910–1970), American poet renowned for his provocative style and large body of works
- Danny Olsen (born 1985), Danish footballer
- Dorothy Olsen (1916–2019), American aircraft pilot and member of the Women Airforce Service Pilots (WASPs)
- Elizabeth Olsen (born 1989), American actress
- Eric Christian Olsen (born 1977), American actor
- Eunice Olsen (born 1977), Singaporean actress and model
- Frances Olsen (born 1945), American law professor at UCLA, feminist law scholar.
- Frederik-Valdemar Olsen (1877–1962), Danish soldier, commander in chief of the Belgian Congo Force Publique
- Gary Olsen (1957–2000), English actor
- Georg Olsen (born 1937), Danish runner
- Greg Olsen (disambiguation), multiple people
- Gregory Olsen (born 1945), American entrepreneur and scientist, space tourist
- Harold Olsen (1895–1953), American college sports coach
- Helle Olsen, better known as Helle Helle, Danish writer born 1965
- Henry Olsen (1887–1978), Norwegian track and field athlete
- Hilde Gunn Olsen (born 1992), Norwegian footballer
- Inger Pors Olsen (born 1966), Danish rower
- Jens Fønsskov Olsen (born 1975), Danish football manager
- Jens Olsen (1872–1945), Danish clockmaker and locksmith
- John Olsen (1928–2023), Australian artist
- John Olsen (born 1945), 42nd Premier of South Australia
- John Olsen Hammerstad (1842–1925), Norwegian-born, American painter
- José María Figueres Olsen (born 1954), 42nd President of Costa Rica
- Karen Olsen Beck (born 1933), Danish American-Costa Rican diplomat and politician
- Ken Olsen (1926–2011), American engineer, co-founder of Digital Equipment Corporation
- Kirsten Olesen (born 1949), Danish actress
- Kjeld Olesen (1932–2024), Danish politician
- Kristoffer Olsen (1883–1948), a Norwegian sailor who competed in the 1920 Summer Olympics
- Kurt Olsen, American attorney who worked on efforts to overturn the 2020 election

== L–Z ==
- Larry Olsen (disambiguation), multiple people
- Lisa Olsen (born 1956), Canadian skydiver
- Lucy Olsen (born 2003), American basketball player
- Mads Olsen (born 2002), Danish politician
- Maria Olsen, South African film producer
- Maria Olsen, New Zealand artist
- Martin Olsen (disambiguation), multiple people
- Mary-Kate and Ashley Olsen (born 1986), American actress twins
- Merlin Olsen, Hall of Fame NFL American football player and TV color commentator
- Michael Olsen (disambiguation), multiple people
- Moroni Olsen (1889–1954), American actor
- Niels Olsen, original name of Cornelius Cruys, 17th century Norwegian-Dutch admiral in Russian service
- Niels Olsen Peet (born 1988), Ecuadorian politician
- Norman Eugene Olsen (1914–1977) was an American football tackle
- Ole Olsen (disambiguation), multiple people
- Ollie Olsen (1958–2024), Australian-based multi-instrumentalist, composer and sound designer.
- Peder Olsen Walløe (1716–1793), Danish-Norwegian Arctic explorer
- Penelope Diane Olsen, Australian ornithologist and author
- Peter B. Olsen (1848–1926), American politician
- Poppy Starr Olsen (born 2000), Australian skateboarder
- Qupanuk Olsen (born 1985), Greenlandic YouTuber, content creator, and engineer
- Regine Olsen (1822-1904), fiancée and muse of Søren Kierkegaard
- Robin Olsen, (born 1990), Swedish football goalkeeper
- Sally Olsen (social worker) (1912–2006), Norwegian-born American social worker and missionary
- Sally Olsen (Minnesota politician) (1934–2022), American lawyer and politician
- Scott Olsen (born 1984), American Major League Baseball pitcher for the Florida Marlins
- Søren Olesen (1891–1973), Danish teacher and politician
- Søren Boel Olesen (born 1984), Danish politician
- Súni Olsen, a Faroese football player
- Susan Olsen (born 1961), American actress best known as Cindy Brady on The Brady Bunch
- Tava Olsen, New Zealand professor in supply chain management
- Thomas Olsen, better known as Tommy Trash (born 1987), Australian EDM producer and DJ
- Thomas Lehne Olsen (born 1991), Norwegian footballer
- Tillie Olsen (1912–2007), American writer, feminist, and political activist
- Tinius Olsen (1845-1932), Norwegian-born, American engineer and inventor
- Urania Marquard Olsen (1856–1932), Danish-Norwegian actress and theatre director
- Viktor Olsen (1924–2023), Norwegian long-distance runner
- Olsen Brothers, Danish rock/pop music duo

== Fictional characters with the surname include ==
- Frank Olsen, a character in the film Mr. Nanny
- Jimmy Olsen, a fictional character who appears in DC Comics' Superman stories
- Tulip Olsen, the main character in Book One of the animated anthology series Infinity Train

== See also ==
- Olson (surname)
- Olsson
