= 2022 Green Party of Aotearoa New Zealand co-leadership election =

- 23 July – 8 September 2022
- Turnout: 107 delegates (first vote); 142 delegates (second vote)
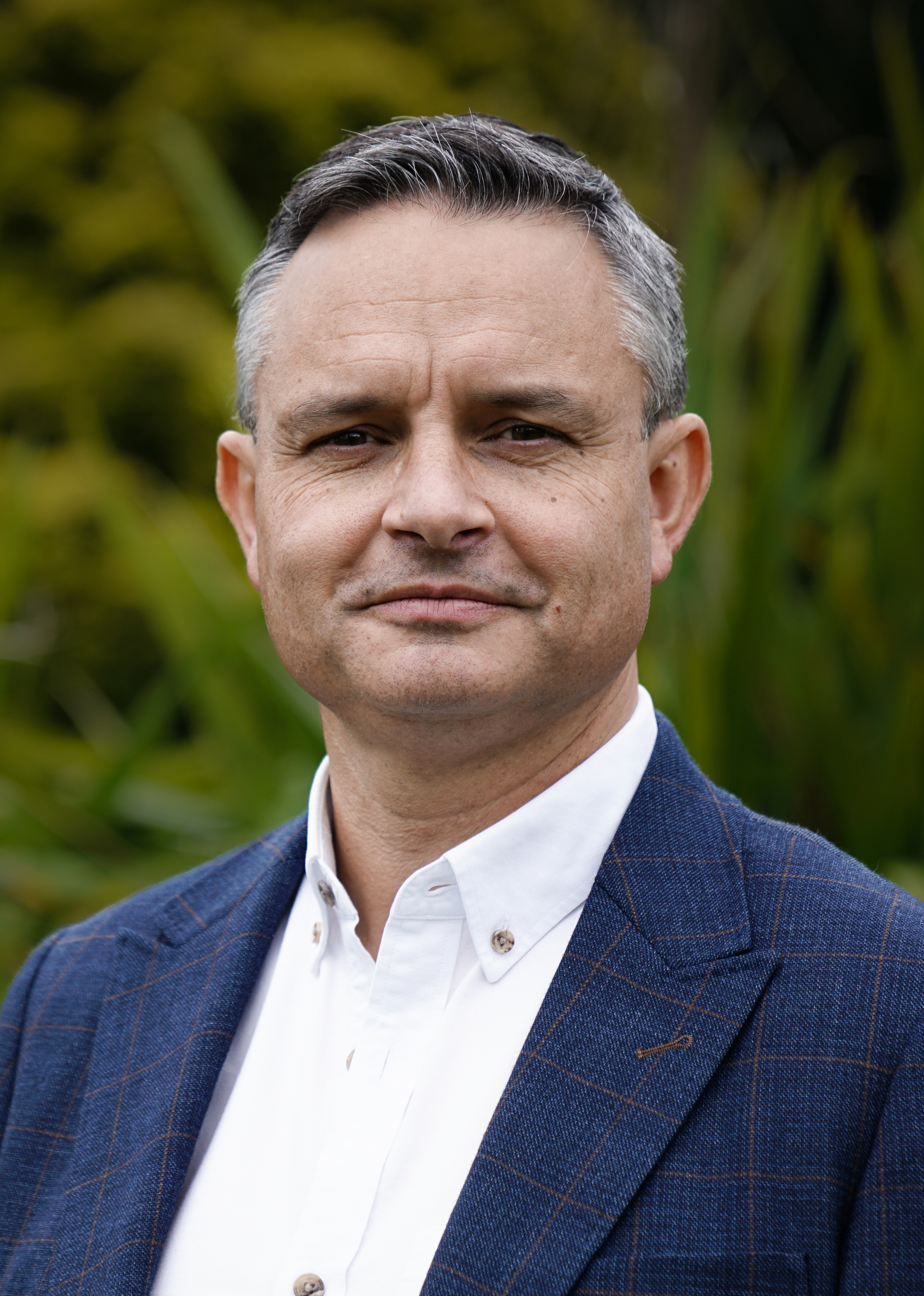

Candidate	James Shaw	Reopen nominations
First vote	75	32
Percentage	70%	30%
Second vote	138	4
Percentage	97%	3%
Co-leaders before election
Marama Davidson
James Shaw
Co-leaders after election
Marama Davidson
James Shaw

The 2022 Green Party of Aotearoa New Zealand co-leadership election was held from July to September. Marama Davidson and James Shaw, the incumbent co-leaders of the Green Party of Aotearoa New Zealand, were re-elected. However, the election for Shaw's position went to a second round. Shaw did not secure a 75 per cent supermajority of party delegates to be re-elected for another year at the party's annual general meeting (AGM) on 23 July, and nominations were reopened. Prior to the AGM, members of the Young Greens had expressed disappointment in Shaw's leadership, particularly in his ministerial portfolios. Davidson served as the sole co-leader until a second election was held.

The second vote was held remotely from 11 August to 8 September. Unlike the secret ballot of the AGM, delegates were required to vote as instructed by their branches. Other Green Members of Parliament, particularly Chlöe Swarbrick, were discussed by media as potential candidates, but ultimately Shaw was the only nominee, and he received 97 per cent of the delegate votes to be re-elected as co-leader.

== Background ==
Under the Green Party's constitution, the party is led by two co-leaders. Historically, it was required that one of the co-leaders be female and the other male. However, the constitution was amended in May 2022 to remove the requirement that one co-leader be male. Additionally, it was resolved that one of the two co-leaders must be Māori. Co-leaders are elected for one-year terms by party delegates at annual general meetings (AGMs). (Note: If a vacancy arises between AGMs, a ballot of delegates or a special general meeting is held to elect a co-leader until the next AGM.) If a leadership position is uncontested, the candidate must secure a 75 per cent majority of party delegates' votes to be confirmed. If this threshold is not met, then nominations for the position are re-opened and a fresh election is held.

James Shaw was first elected to Parliament at the 2014 general election. He came third in the Wellington Central electorate but was ranked twelfth on the party list and was elected as a list MP. After Russel Norman retired from politics in 2015, Shaw was elected to replace him as party co-leader, defeating sitting MPs Kevin Hague and Gareth Hughes and Waitematā Local Board member Vernon Tava. Shaw was re-elected as a list MP at the 2017 and 2020 general elections. Following the 2017 general election, Shaw became a minister in the Sixth Labour Government. At the party's 2021 AGM, Shaw was challenged for the co-leadership position by Dunedin-based activist James Cockle. Shaw received 116 delegate votes to Cockle's 4. Marama Davidson was elected as co-leader in the 2018 leadership election and served continuously alongside Shaw.

== AGM and first vote ==
In mid-July 2022 it was reported that members of the party's youth wing, Young Greens, had expressed disappointment in Shaw's work as Minister for Climate Change and Associate Minister for the Environment and sought to challenge his leadership at the 2022 AGM. Shaw expressed confidence in being reconfirmed, stating "I do expect that there will be some people who vote to reopen nominations, but that happens every year." The party's 2022 AGM was scheduled to be held in Christchurch but was moved online due to the prevalence of COVID-19 at the time, and particularly the risk of members from the North Island becoming infected and being required to isolate in the South Island. When questioned by media, Shaw rejected that the shifting of the meeting from an in-person format to online was related to questions over his leadership.

At the co-leadership vote on 23 July 2022, which was held as a secret ballot, Davidson was reconfirmed in her position, fulfilling both requirements that there be at least one female co-leader and at least one Māori co-leader. Of the 150 eligible delegates, 107 voted. 75 delegates voted for Shaw, and 32 voted to reopen nominations for Shaw's position. Since Shaw received less than 75 per cent of the delegate votes, the position was declared vacant and nominations were re-opened. This was the first time in the party's history that an incumbent co-leader ran unsuccessfully for re-election. At a press conference that evening, Shaw expressed his surprise at the result. Nominations for the co-leadership position were re-opened from 28 July to 4 August. Davidson served as the only party co-leader until the next vote was held. Prime Minister Jacinda Ardern stated that Shaw would continue as a minister regardless of his co-leadership status.

Candidate	Votes	%
James Shaw	75	70.09
Reopen nominations	32	29.91
Turnout	107	71.33
Eligible delegates	150	—N/a

== Second vote ==
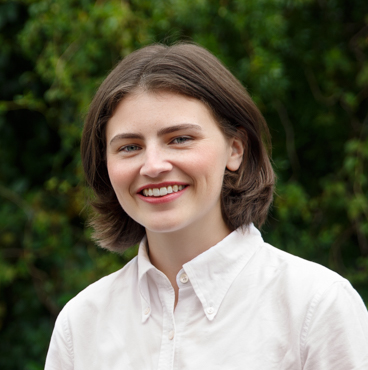
Chlöe Swarbrick was described as the person most likely to challenge Shaw, but declined to run for the co-leadership.

Immediately following the AGM vote on 23 July, Shaw stated that he would take advice but was "inclined" to stand for re-election. On 25 July, he announced that he would seek the co-leadership again. Shaw explained that since the AGM vote he had received messages from party members and some branches whose delegates did not participate in the AGM vote which gave him reassurance that he had the support necessary to be re-elected. Chlöe Swarbrick, MP for Auckland Central, was identified as a potential candidate by some commentators. Toby Manhire of The Spinoff described her as the most likely and possibly only challenger. University of Auckland political scientist Lara Greaves pointed to Swarbrick's 2020 upset victory in Auckland Central as evidence that she is a strong campaigner and suggested that as co-leader she might motivate higher turnout amongst some voters. Writing for The New Zealand Herald, Michael Neilson stated that in the aftermath of the AGM vote "pundits have since speculated that Swarbrick may have a tilt for the co-leadership given her popularity." Swarbrick ruled out running for the co-leadership on 25 July, following the announcement of Shaw's candidacy. She rejected the media speculation around her potential candidacy, stating "If the media wants to talk leadership, let's talk about it", before praising the leadership of School Strike for Climate activists, trade unions, teachers and health professionals.

Elizabeth Kerekere told media she was "considering options", and Teanau Tuiono publicly considered a run against Shaw, but both ultimately declined to stand for the position, and Shaw was the only candidate nominated. Other MPs who ruled out running for the co-leadership position to media were Golriz Ghahraman, Ricardo Menéndez March and Eugenie Sage.

The second vote was held remotely. Delegates again had the options to vote for Shaw or to re-open nominations. To be re-elected, Shaw had to receive 75% of valid delegate votes. Branches met to instruct their delegates on how to vote; unlike the AGM vote's secret ballot, delegate votes had to be witnessed by fellow branch members. Ballots were distributed to party branches on 11 August and were due back on 8 September. Results were announced by the party on 10 September 2022. Of the 145 eligible delegates, 142 cast votes in the election. Shaw received 138 delegate votes or 97 per cent, more than the 75 per cent required, and was re-elected as co-leader.

Candidate	Votes	%
James Shaw	138	97.18
Reopen nominations	4	2.81
Turnout	142	97.93
Eligible delegates	145	—N/a

== Analysis ==
The difference between the AGM vote and the secondary vote was discussed in media. Shaw mused that the secret ballot process of the AGM vote reflected that he was less popular with AGM delegates than the wider party membership. It was reported that delegates who voted to reopen nominations at the AGM did so due to concerns around lack of progress on climate change, a closening relationship with the Labour Party and disengagement with the membership under Shaw's leadership. Prior to the AGM vote, Davidson stated that much of the criticism Shaw receives relates to his role as Minister of Climate Change but that Shaw works hard and had achieved a lot in the role, including a national emissions reduction plan. Following the vote, Davidson said she was "shocked" and "saddened" at the result. Former Green MP Catherine Delahunty speculated that the AGM vote result may have been based on Shaw's desire to build parliamentary consensus on climate change issues. Former MP Gareth Hughes pointed out that the party had a long history of discomfort with leadership.

The Spinoff's Manhire wrote that the low delegate turnout (71 per cent) for the AGM vote may have been due to the late decision to shift the meeting from in-person to online. He described the surprised reactions of Shaw and Davidson to the AGM vote as an indication that they need to pay better attention to the mood of the party membership. Marc Daalder of Newsroom reported that supporters of Shaw believed some AGM delegates voted against the wishes of their branches. Delegates that Daalder interviewed rejected these claims. Daalder also noted that branch meeting attendees are not necessarily representative of the party membership, particularly given that branch meetings are often held in evenings.

The opinion polling for the Green party vote did not significantly change as a result of the co-leadership election. Shaw credited this to the robustness of the party process, adding "I quite like being a member of a party that is uncomfortable with power, and that’s constantly questioning whether it’s doing the right thing, and agonising over the compromises that come with being part of a government." He resolved to be more outspoken about his disagreements with government policy and action on climate change.
