= Tava (disambiguation) =

A tava is a large disc-shaped frying pan.

Tava may also refer to:

== People ==
- Tava Olsen (born 1969), New Zealand business professor
- Tava Smiley, American actress and television host
- Vernon Tava, Australian-born New Zealand barrister and politician

== Business ==
- Tava (soft drink), a carbonated beverage released by PepsiCo, 2008–2009
- Tava Corporation, a short-lived American computer manufacturer and retail company, 1983–1984
- Nokia C2 Tava, an entry-level smartphone

== Other uses ==
- tava, the local Samoan and Tongan names for plant species Pometia pinnata
- Tava bread, an alternative name for Saj bread
- Tava (butterfly), a genus of skipper butterflies in the tribe Moncina
- Transgender American Veterans Association (TAVA), an advocacy group for transgender veterans from the US military
- Birinci Udullu or Tava), a village and municipality, Hajigabul District, Azerbaijan
- Tava Island, in the Bay of Baku, Azerbaijan

== See also ==
- Tava lokam, one of the Seven Logas in Ayyavazhi mythology
- Tavas, a town and district, Denizli Province, Turkey
- Tawa (disambiguation)
