= Hammerstad (surname) =

Hammerstad is a surname. Notable people with the surname include:

- Hans Laurits Olsen Hammerstad (1840–1877), Norwegian politician
- John Olsen Hammerstad (1842–1925), Norwegian-born American painter
- Oddmund Hammerstad (born 1942), Norwegian military officer, businessperson and politician
- Ole Larsen Hammerstad (1817–1873), Norwegian politician
