= Norman Olson (disambiguation) =

Norman Olson (born 1946) is an American militia movement activist.

Norman Olson may also refer to:

- Norman Olsen (1914–1977), American football tackle
- Norman E. Olson (1915–1944), U.S. Army Air Forces World War II flying ace

== See also ==
- Olson (surname)
- Olsen (surname)
