= 2021 Green Party of Aotearoa New Zealand co-leadership election =

New Zealand political party

- 7 August 2021
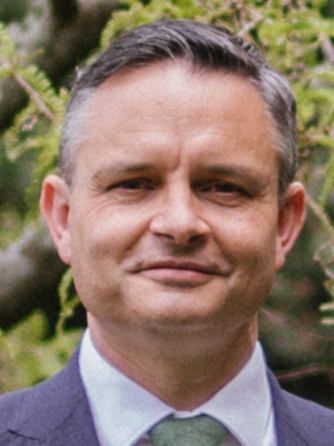

Candidate	James Shaw	Reopen nominations
Delegate count	116	20
Percentage	82.86%	14.29%
Co-leader before election
James Shaw
Co-leader after election
James Shaw

The 2021 Green Party of Aotearoa New Zealand co-leadership election was held to elect a Green Party co-leader. The election was won on the first ballot by incumbent co-leader and List MP, James Shaw.

== Background ==
In July 2021 Green Party member James Cockle announced his intention to stand for co-leader of the Green Party at that years annual general meeting (AGM). This triggered an election to fill the male co-leadership. It was the first time a sitting co-leader had been challenged for the leadership at an AGM since 2013.

== Candidates ==
=== James Cockle ===
Cockle, a climate activist and software developer from Dunedin, ran for the leadership campaigning largely on promoting existing Green Party policy. He stated his unhappiness with the progress the Greens were making during the Parliamentary term and wanted the Greens to become a "major party" and cease being seen as "Labour's little helper".

=== James Shaw ===
James Shaw had been a List MP since 2014 and had been co-leader since 2015. Following the formation of the Sixth Labour Government, which the Green Party supported, he was appointed a minister outside cabinet as Minister for Climate Change (2017–present) and Minister of Statistics (2017–2020). Shaw stated he was "quietly confident" he would be re-elected by party members.

== Result ==
The voting was conducted via ballot of the 140 party delegates from electorates across the country. The following table gives the ballot results:

Candidate	Votes	%
James Shaw	116	82.86
James Cockle	4	2.86
Reopen nominations	20	14.29
Majority	96	68.57
Turnout	140	—N/a
