= Barry Coates =

New Zealand politician

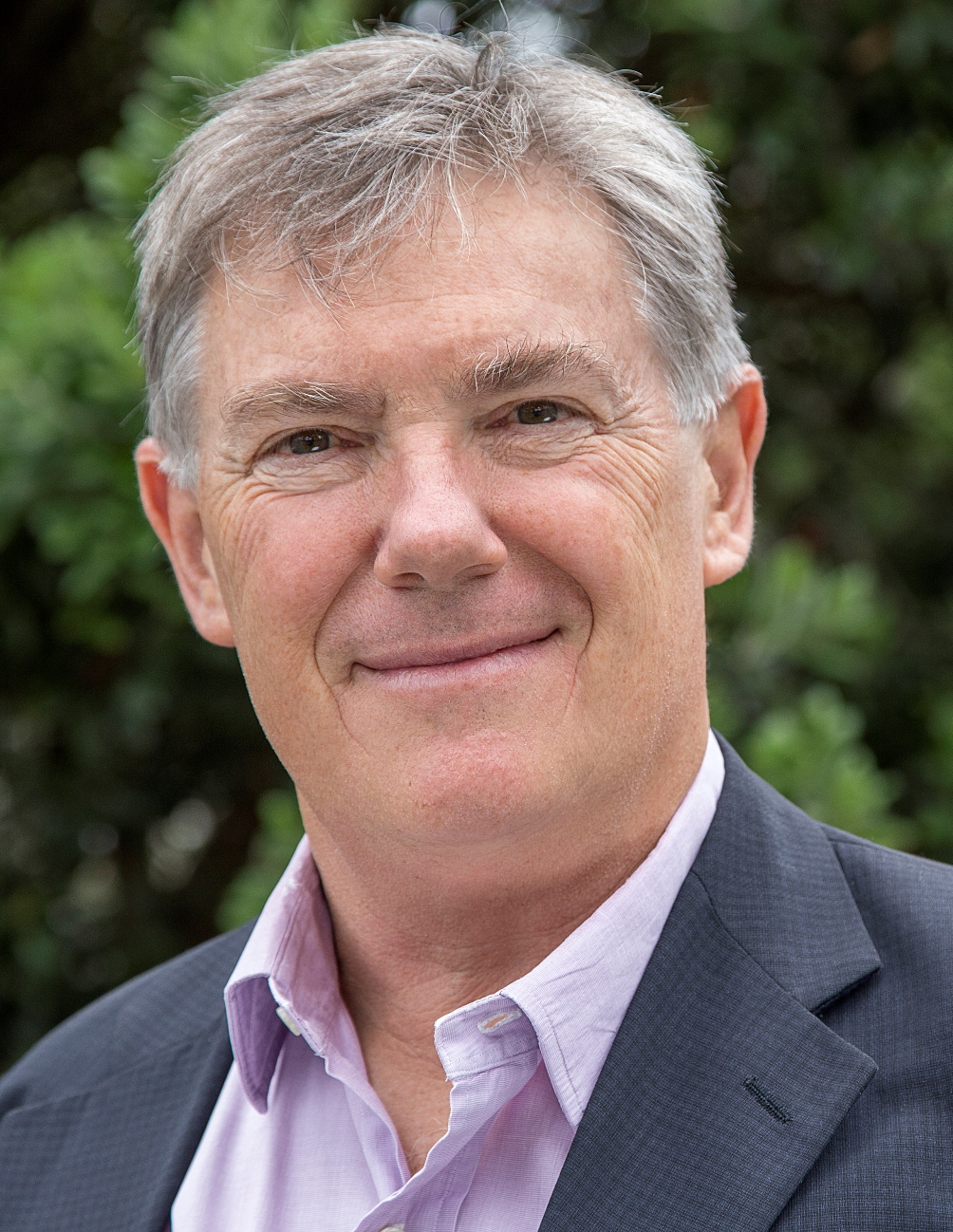

Member of the New Zealand Parliament for Green party list
- In office 7 October 2016 – 23 September 2017
- Preceded by: Kevin Hague

Personal details
- Born: 18 October 1956 (age 70) Auckland, New Zealand
- Party: Greens

Robert Barry Hobson Coates (born 18 October 1956) is a New Zealand politician who was a member of the New Zealand House of Representatives as a representative of the Green Party of Aotearoa New Zealand. Since 2019 he has been chief executive of the ethical investment charity Mindful Money.

== Environmental career ==
Coates worked for the government of Samoa from 1978 to 1980, promoting the development of small business. He has a bachelor of Commerce from the University of Auckland and a Masters in Public and Private Management from the Yale School of Management.

Coates worked at World Wide Fund for Nature WWF-UK from 1991, until 1996. He was an NGO observer on the British government delegation to the Earth Summit (the United Nations Conference on Environment and Development) at Rio de Janeiro in 1992, and was closely involved in sustainable development policy in the UK and internationally.

He was Executive Director of the World Development Movement (subsequently renamed Global Justice Now) from 1996 until 2003. During this time he played a leading role in international research and campaigns on trade and investment agreements, sustainable development, corporate accountability, Third World debt and international aid and development policy.

== Political career ==
New Zealand Parliament
Years	Term	Electorate	List	Party
2016–2017	51st	List	16	Green

Coates was the Executive Director of Oxfam New Zealand from September 2003, and he stepped down on 7 March 2014 to contest the general election for the Green Party in the Mount Roskill electorate. He subsequently developed a programme on sustainability for the University of Auckland Business School, and was Coordinator of "It's Our Future", the campaign against the Trans-Pacific Partnership Agreement (TPPA).

On 5 September 2016, it was announced that Kevin Hague intended to resign from the House of Representatives, and that Coates would replace him as a list MP.

On 7 October 2016, he was officially sworn in as Member of the House of Representatives and member of the Green Party parliamentary caucus.

Coates suggested in a July 2017 post on the left-wing "The Daily Blog" that the Green Party might force a second election if the Labour Party formed a coalition with New Zealand First without the Greens. His comments were challenged by co-leader James Shaw who stated that forcing a hung parliament or second election was "absolutely not" the party's position. As number 10 on the party's list, he was not re-elected when the Greens elected only 8 MPs.

== Post-politics ==
Following the 2017 general election, Coates founded the consumer awareness organisation "Mindful Money", which focuses on ethical investment practices. In October 2019, Coates praised the Sustainable Finance Forum's draft report advocating ethical investment particularly the transition towards a low-emissions economy and inclusiveness. In 2019, Mindful Money convinced several fund managers at KiwiSaver to reconsider their investments in nuclear weapons manufacturing. As a result, investment in nuclear weapons dropped from $100 million in 2019 to below $10 million in 2024. Following the Gaza war, Coates and Francesca Albanese (the United Nations Special Rapporteur on the occupied Palestinian territories) met with 10 KiwiSaver managers to petition them to divest from companies identified by Mindful Money or the United Nations Human Rights Council as support Israeli settlements in the West Bank. Mindful Money was criticised by Dr David Cumin of the pro-Israel lobby group "Israel Institute of New Zealand" for an alleged "undue fixation" on Israel. Coates disagreed with Cumin's assertion, saying that Mindful Matters was focusing on companies violating ethical standards and international humanitarian and human rights laws.
