= Young Greens of Aotearoa New Zealand =

Youth wing of New Zealand Green Party

- Co-Convenors: Lauren Craig; Maioha Hunt
- Founded: 2006; 20 years ago
- Ideology: Green politics
- Political position: Left-wing
- International affiliation: Global Young Greens
- Mother party: Green Party of Aotearoa New Zealand

Website
- younggreens.org.nz

The Young Greens of Aotearoa New Zealand (or simply Young Greens) is the youth wing of the Green Party of Aotearoa New Zealand, and a member of the Global Young Greens. The Young Greens represent Green Party members 35 years of age and under. The Young Greens were founded by MP and then Young Green Gareth Hughes in 2006.

== Activities ==
=== Campaigns ===
The Young Greens have been involved in several different political campaigns, particularly around issues that affect youth. These include Keep It 18, which opposed raising the drinking age from 18 to 21; and petitioning parliament to ban conversion therapy, in a joint effort with fellow youth wing Young Labour.

=== Summer camp ===
Each summer, a camp is traditionally held at Jeanette Fitzsimons' farm in the Coromandel Peninsula.

== Structure ==
=== Executive ===
The Young Greens have a national executive, consisting of two co-convenors, a secretary, a membership secretary, a treasurer, Pou Tikanga, two social media coordinators, a Global Young Greens representatives, an equity officer, and a campus co-ordinator.

=== Campus groups ===
The Young Greens have a presence at New Zealand's largest universities. As of 2018, there are Young Green campus groups at 7 universities.

== Office holders ==
=== Current members of parliament ===
- Chlöe Swarbrick (2017–present)
- Tamatha Paul (2023–present)

=== Former members of parliament ===
- Holly Walker (2011–2014)
- Gareth Hughes (2010–2020)

=== Co-convenors ===
- 2007 – Gareth Hughes
- 2008 – Gareth Hughes/Luke Stewart
- 2009 – Georgina Morrison and Zack Dorner
- 2010 – Holly Walker and Aaryn Barlow
- 2011 – Brooklynne Kennedy and Vernon Tava
- 2012 – Izzy Lomax-Sawyers and Jackson James Wood
- 2013 – Lucy Gordon and Philip Nannestad
- 2014 – Terri Gough and Zane McCarthy
- 2015 – Ana Martin and Zane McCarthy
- 2016 – Ana Martin and Ben Ogilvie/Ricardo Menéndez March
- 2017 – Meg Williams and Elliot Crossan
- 2018 – Mona Oliver and Max Tweedie
- 2019 – Kelsey Lee and Danielle Marks
- 2020 – Matariki Roche and Danielle Marks
- 2021 – Rohan O'Neill-Stevens and Lourdes Vano/Gina Dao-McLay
- 2022 – Gina Dao-McLay and M Grace-Stent
- 2023 – Caeden Tipler and M Grace-Stent
- 2024 – Caitlin Wilson and Donald Mayo
- 2025 – Lauren Craig and Maioha Hunt

== Notable alumni ==
- Ricardo Menéndez March – Member of Parliament
- Rohan O'Neill-Stevens - Nelson City Councillor, Deputy Mayor of Nelson
- Holly Walker – Member of Parliament
- Gareth Hughes – Member of Parliament
- Vernon Tava – leader of Sustainable New Zealand Party
- Caitlin Wilson – Waitematā Local Board Member

== See also ==
- Green Party of Aotearoa New Zealand
- Global Young Greens
