= Young New Zealand First =

Youth wing of NZ First party

- Leader: Keegan Langeveld
- Founded: 2010 (formally incorporated into NZ First constitution in 2015)
- Ideology: Nationalism; Populism

Young New Zealand First (shortened to Young NZ First) is the youth wing and student wing of the New Zealand First party. It was formally incorporated into the party in 2015.

== History ==
=== Foundation and early years ===
According to The Spinoff, Young NZ First was founded in 2010. However, the Dominion Post reported in 2009 on a youth branch of NZ First being created by Tim Manu, a NZ First member, city councillor, and part-time music teacher. Manu said he had been frustrated while a student to see National and Labour groups on campus but no group for NZ First.

It appears that the formation of Young NZ First was driven by the party's leader, Winston Peters. Initial members were reportedly generally left-wing, which contrasted to NZ First's overall centrism. Early membership figures are not clear; a former member reports around a dozen members, while another stated that as of 2012 it had 60 members and multiple branches. The presence of a youth wing allowed NZ First to counteract its image of a party of older members, such as John Key's comments that NZ First supporters were "dying out".

The nascent youth wing had influence over the main party during the 2011 election campaign, with one member taking roles such as being on electoral committees, a campaign manager for a candidate, and an informal media adviser. The youth wing apparently influenced the party to promise to forgive student debt to graduates who remained in New Zealand for five years, and to reduce use of anti-immigration and "race-baiting rhetoric" that had been used in previous campaigns.

A key early figure in the organisation was Curwen Rolinson, who was elected to the party's board of directors at age 20, became the public face of Young NZ First, and had a close relationship with the party's leader, Winston Peters. However, in 2015, Rolinson (aged 25) resigned, having developed a fractious relationship with the party's leadership. Rolinson continued to write a blog called "NZ First Youth" and was associated with NZ First members but was not connected with the party or the youth wing.

=== Incorporation into party structure ===
Young New Zealand First was formally incorporated into the NZ First party structure in 2015. This incorporation was the subject of controversy within the party. Young NZ First had repeatedly attempted to formalise its relationship with the party without success. This led to problems when Rolinson was cited by media as being the leader of the NZ First youth wing, despite such a thing not officially existing. In 2015, Winston Peters released a statement that the NZ First youth wing did not exist and that Rolinson had been "told countless times never to call himself the president or leader of a youth wing." Despite this, Young New Zealand First formally became part of the party, with a role set by the party's constitution, after a remit passed at the party's 2015 convention.

Today, New Zealand First has a permanent position on its board assigned to be filled by a member of Young NZ First. However, Young New Zealand First members who join the party itself are a separate membership category. Board member Julie Carr said in 2019 that this is "because they are inexperienced with political matters and need to be guided and mentored in their role".

In late July 2026, Young NZ First claimed to have tripled its membership in the past 18 months, which it attributed to a face-to-face grassroots campaign and a sense of camaraderie. According to Newsroom, its members claimed that other parties lacked the creativity or courage to "try something new" without copying overseas movements.

== Leadership ==
As of May 2021, the leader of Young New Zealand First is Keegan Langeveld. Previous leaders have included Jay McLaren-Harris and Robert Gore.

== Policies and actions ==
=== Same-sex marriage ===
While the NZ First party opposed the Marriage (Definition of Marriage) Amendment Act 2013 and instead wanted a national referendum on same-sex marriage, Young NZ First signed a joint statement in support of the bill. The decision to do so caused tension in the party and led to Peters and the party leadership becoming increasingly wary of Young NZ First.

=== Restricting voting rights for immigrants ===
At the NZ First party conference in 2018, Young NZ First put forward a remit that would restrict voting rights of immigrants; instead of gaining the right to vote after a year of living in New Zealand, immigrants would need to be a "permanent resident" as defined in the Immigration Act. NZ First party members voted in favour of the remit.

=== Testing of drugs ===
Young NZ First opposed NZ First's policy regarding drug checking at festivals. The Labour and Green parties had proposed legalising testing of drugs at festivals and other events, but New Zealand First opposed the legislation with leader Winston Peters saying "We at New Zealand First say it's not safe, don't do it. If you want to live, then stick to things that are safe". Without NZ First's support the legislation could not progress. By contrast, Young NZ First said that testing would help save lives.

At NZ First's annual conference in October 2019, Young NZ First's chair William Woodward put up a remit calling for the party to reevaluate its policy. Prior to the conference, Peters said he was confident that "a significant majority" of NZ First backed its current position, but NZ First's members voted for the party to reconsider the issue. The party announced it would do so before the upcoming summer festivals, but this did not occur; as of April 2020 the party has made no further comments on the issue either way.

== Controversies ==
In 2016, a group of Young NZ First members chanted "Build the Wall" at Ricardo Menéndez March, a Young Greens member of Mexican descent, during an AUSA Back Benches political event. Young NZ First later apologised to him.

In 2017, it was revealed alt-right groups expressed a desire to "influence NZFirst both directly and through Young NZFirst". When asked if Young New Zealand First were concerned about this, the Young New Zealand First leader at the time, Robert Gore, said “It’s not really a concern at all. At the end of the day, if you want to put your country and your people first, then we’ll take you. But we expect a degree of common decency and politeness.” When asked to confirm he would have no objection to someone identifying as "alt-right" joining, he said "The problem is, I don’t even know what that label means. I’ve never seen one consistent definition for what that word actually means."

In August 2026, The Press newspaper reported that Nicholas Newport, a member of Young NZ First's executive, had appeared at least two far right protests and was linked to social media accounts expressing support for the banned Australian neo-nazi group National Socialist Network.
