= Tawa =

Tawa may refer to:

== Places ==
- Tawa, Edmonton, a residential neighbourhood in Edmonton, Canada
- Tawa, New Zealand, a suburb of Wellington
  - Tawa AFC, an association football club
  - Tawa College, a coeducational school in Tawa, New Zealand
- Tawa, Dahanu, a village in Maharashtra, India
- Tawa River, in central India
- Tawa, Toowoomba, a heritage-listed house in Queensland, Australia

== Other uses ==
- Tava, also called Tawa(h), a frying pan originating on the Indian subcontinent
- Tawa (crater), an impact crater on Rhea
- Tawa hallae, a dinosaur named after the solar deity of the Puebloan peoples (using the Hopi name)
- Tawa (tree), after which the New Zealand suburb is named
- An early variation on the name of the Ottawa tribe
- Tawa (mythology), a solar deity in Hopi mythology
- Bert Marcelo, nicknamed "Tawa", Filipino comedian.

== See also ==
- Tava (disambiguation)
- Tawas City, Michigan, U.S.
