= Ricardo Menéndez March =

New Zealand Green Party politician

Ricardo Menéndez March MP
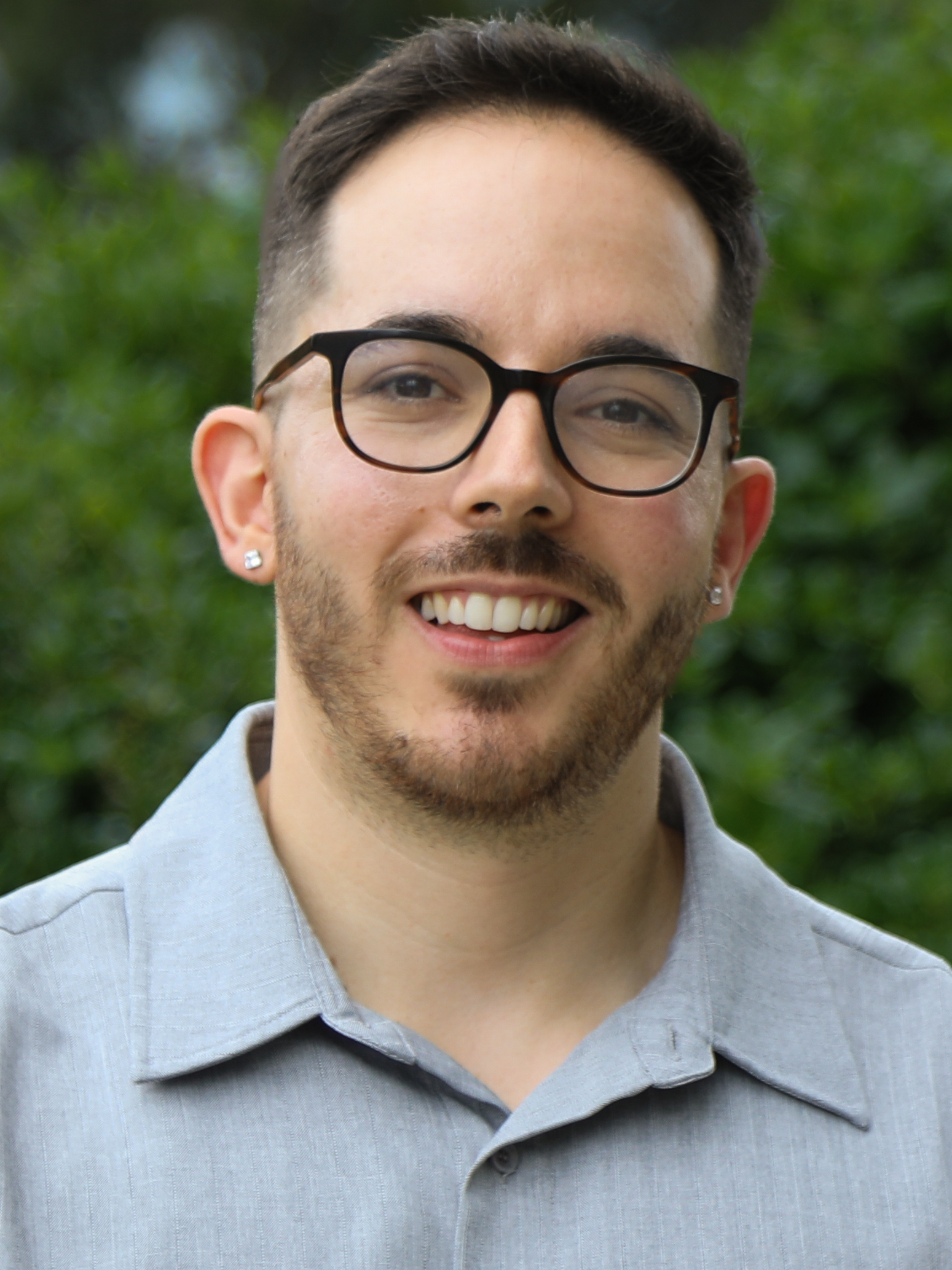
- Menéndez March in 2026

Member of the New Zealand Parliament for Green party list
- Incumbent
- Assumed office 17 October 2020

Personal details
- Born: 1987 or 1988 (age 37–38) Tijuana, Baja California, Mexico
- Party: Green

Ricardo Menéndez March (born 1987 or 1988) is a New Zealand activist and politician who, since 2020, is a Member of Parliament for the Green Party of Aotearoa New Zealand in the House of Representatives.

== Early life and career ==
Menéndez March moved to New Zealand from Tijuana, Baja California, Mexico, in 2006. He worked as a film projectionist for a decade in Auckland, but was made redundant due to film digitisation. After that role, he worked in hospitality, then in migrant advocacy.

Menéndez March served as male co-convenor of Young Greens of Aotearoa New Zealand in 2016. At the University of Auckland Public Policy Club Baby Back Benches debate in 2016, a group of Young New Zealand First members started chanting "Build the Wall" at Menéndez March, who is of Mexican descent. Young New Zealand First later apologised to him.

Menéndez March is the coordinator for Auckland Action Against Poverty, a role he took up in late 2017. A writer for Stuff described him in 2020 as "a thorn in the side of the Labour-led Government in the past few years". In this role, he had frequently appeared on television, radio, and quoted in newspapers – once a week on average, by his estimate – stating that the government had been failing the poor, that benefits are too low and housing is too expensive. Menéndez March has been particularly critical of KiwiBuild, arguing that the scheme should be targeted towards working poor and unemployed families and that the current set up will make homeownership rates fall further by encouraging increased property speculation and gentrification.

Menéndez March is gay.

== Political career ==
New Zealand Parliament
Years	Term	Electorate	List	Party
2020–2023	53rd	List	10	Green
2023–2026	54th	List	8	Green
2026–present	55th	List	9	Green

Menéndez March ran for the Green Party in the 2017 New Zealand general election. He ran in the Mount Roskill electorate and received 1,200 votes. He was 21 on the party list, and was placed too far down to be allocated a seat.

=== First term, 2020–2023 ===
For the 2020 New Zealand general election, Menéndez March was placed tenth on the Green party list, and ran for the Maungakiekie electorate. During the election campaign, he criticised his party co-leader James Shaw for supporting $11.7m of funding for a private green school. Menéndez March did not win the Maungakiekie electorate, coming third place behind the National MP Denise Lee and Labour MP Priyanca Radhakrishnan, with 2,666 votes. However, the Greens received 7.9% of the party vote (226,754), and his list placement was high enough for him to enter Parliament as a list MP. Menéndez March was one of three new Green MPs in the 53rd Parliament.

In December 2020, Menéndez March travelled to Mexico during the COVID-19 pandemic to care for his family. His step-mother had aggressive cancer and had been given months to live, and his father had had major surgery with long-lasting effects. The person who had cared for the couple had become extremely ill herself and was unable to care for them. He was criticised by opposition leader Judith Collins for doing so. In late February, Menéndez March drew media attention after National MP Chris Bishop disclosed that Menéndez March had made two attempts to gain a place in "managed isolation and quarantine" for "national interest" reasons.

In April 2023, the Greens confirmed that Menéndez March would be contesting former Prime Minister Jacinda Ardern's Mount Albert electorate during the 2023 New Zealand general election as part of a "two ticks" campaign.

=== Second term, 2023–2026 ===
During the 2023 election held on 14 October, Menéndez March came third place in Mount Albert behind Labour MP Helen White and National MP Melissa Lee, with 9,296 votes. Despite failing to take Mount Albert, Menéndez March was re-elected to Parliament on the Green party list.

In late November 2023, Menéndez March assumed the Green Party's social development and employment, workforce planning and development, immigration, and associate health (primary health) portfolios. He also became the Musterer for the Green Party.

On 30 July 2024, Trade Minister Todd McClay was recorded as saying "you're not in Mexico now, we don't do things like that here" to Menéndez March during a parliamentary sitting. Menéndez March subsequently raised the matter with Speaker Gerry Brownlee, who ordered McClay to withdraw and apologise. Following the incident, Menéndez March described McClay's remarks as "pretty racist and unacceptable".

In late January 2025, Menéndez March was the subject of verbal attacks by New Zealand First MP Shane Jones, who shouted "send the Mexicans home" during a Parliamentary debate. The Green Party subsequently complained to Prime Minister Christopher Luxon and Speaker of the House Gerry Brownlee. The Mexican Embassy subsequently raised concerns about Jones' remarks with NZ First leader and Foreign Minister Winston Peters.

On 19 February 2025, Menéndez March was criticised by NZ First MPs Peters and Jones for referring to New Zealand as "Aotearoa" while questioning Immigration Minister Erica Stanford. Peters also sought to change standing orders around references to New Zealand. Speaker Gerry Brownlee defended March but reminded MPs to refer to New Zealand by both its English and Māori language names.

In mid-February 2025, Menéndez March met with Associate Immigration Minister Christopher Penk to raise concerns about Immigration New Zealand's deportation proceedings against 18-year old Indian teenager Davan Kumar. While he had lived his entire life in New Zealand, his Indian parents had overstayed their visas since his birth. Penk subsequently used his discretionary powers to grant Kumar a residency visa on 20 February but upheld deportation proceedings against Kumar's parents. March and Kumar's lawyer Alastair McClymont said they would continue fighting for Kumar's parents residency rights.

=== Third term, 2026–present ===
During the 2026 New Zealand general election, Menéndez March was ranked ninth on the Green Party list. He contested the Mount Albert electorate. Based on preliminary results, Menéndez March came fourth place in the Mt Albert race, gaining 3,595 votes. He was elected to Parliament via the Green Party list.

== Views and positions ==
=== Political views ===
Menéndez March identifies as a "proud socialist" and a "true Marxist". He said that the Green Party would work hard to offer support to Labour to enact "genuine bold socialist policy".

=== Anti-monarchism ===
Before sitting in Parliament, Menéndez March expressed reluctance to swearing the required Oath of Allegiance to the Queen of New Zealand, Elizabeth II. He posted a meme about it, which received criticism from monarchists. He did however take the oath.

=== Israel-Palestine ===
In May 2021, Menéndez March drew media attention after he posted pictures on himself on Facebook and Twitter with the caption. "From the river to the sea, Palestine will be free!" in response to the 2021 Israel-Palestine crisis. The New Zealand Jewish Council criticised Menéndez March's post, claiming that the slogan was used by Hamas to promote antisemitism and the ethnic cleansing of Jews. However, the use of the slogan was defended by Alternative Jewish Voice, arguing that freedom is not "a zero-sum business". Menéndez March's posts led the libertarian ACT Party's Deputy Leader Brooke Van Velden to oppose the Green Party's motion calling for Members of Parliament to recognise the right of Palestinians to self-determination and statehood. In response to Van Velden's criticism, Green MP Golriz Ghahraman asserted that Menéndez March was defending the rights of both Arabs and Jews to having equal rights in their homeland.

During the Gaza war, Menéndez March attended a Palestinian solidarity rally where he joined fellow Green MPs Chlöe Swarbrick, Steve Abel and Darleen Tana in chanting "From the river to the sea, Palestine will be free."
