= Ole Olsen =

Ole Olsen may refer to:

- Ole Olsen (baseball) (1894–1980), pitcher for the Detroit Tigers
- Ole Olsen (comedian) (1892–1963), American vaudeville comedian
- Ole Olsen (filmmaker) (1863–1943), Danish film producer and founder of Nordisk Film
- Ole Olsen (musician) (1850–1927), Norwegian organist, composer, and conductor
- Ole Olsen (speedway rider) (born 1946), Danish speedway rider and three-time World Champion
- Ole Olsen (sport shooter) (1869–1944), Danish sport shooter
- Ole Andres Olsen (1845–1915), Norwegian-American Seventh-day Adventist leader
- Ole Birk Olesen (born 1972), Danish politician
- Ola Dybwad-Olsen (born 1946), Norwegian footballer
- Ole H. Olson (1872–1954), governor of North Dakota (1934–1935)
- Ole Kristian Olsen (born 1950), Norwegian footballer
- Ole Tobias Olsen (1830–1924), Norwegian teacher and minister
- Ole Wøhlers Olsen (born 1942), Danish ambassador
- Olle Olsson (born 1948), Swedish handball player
- Ole Olson, an 1889 play by American actor and humorist Gus Heege
