= Larry Olsen =

Larry Olsen may refer to:

- Larry Olsen (jockey) (born 1948), Australian jockey and reporter for Sky News Australia
- Larry C. Olsen (born 1937), materials scientist
- Larry Olsen (actor), in Casanova Brown
- Larry Olsen, co-founder of the Society of Janus

== See also ==
- Lawrence Olsen, Canadian politician
