= Martin Olsen =

Martin Olsen may refer to:

- Martin Olsen (bandy) (1920–1979), Norwegian bandy player
- Martin Olsen (boxer) (1894–1971), Danish boxer
- Martin Spang Olsen (born 1962), lecturer, stuntman, writer and actor

== See also ==
- Martin Olson (born 1952), American comedy writer and television producer
- Martin Olsson (born 1988), Swedish footballer
