= Lisa Olsen =

Canadian-American skydiver (born 1956)

Personal information
- National team: Canada
- Born: October 7, 1956 (age 69) Canada
Medal record
Representing Canada
Women's Parachuting
World Championships
Silver medal – second place	1982 Lucenec, Czechoslovakia	Team Accuracy
Gold medal – first place	1988 Sweden	Individual Accuracy
- Updated on 21 September 2016

Lisa Olsen (born October 7, 1956) is a Canadian-American skydiver.

== Early life ==
Olsen originally studied at the University of Alberta and was a music major. She considered a career as a flutist in a symphony orchestra. However, after joining the university parachuting club and making her first jump, her goals changed. She transferred to the faculty of arts and, after graduating, went into nursing as a career. She acknowledged that she found her first jump terrifying, and stated that all jumpers are terrified the first time jumping. Over time, however, Olsen came to view skydiving as a learning experience rather than a thrill seeking activity.

== Career ==
Olsen won the Gold Medal in Women's Individual Accuracy at the XIX World Parachuting Championships in Sweden in 1988. Although she had fewer jumps than some of her competitors, she edged out two women from China on the final jump. In 1982, Olsen, along with teammates Brenda Blue, Kathy Kangas, Eileen Vaughan, and Bev Watson, won the Silver Medal in Women's Team Accuracy at the XVI World Parachuting Championships in Czechoslovakia—now Slovakia-- after which they posed in bikinis in a 1982 issue of CanPara (Canadian Parachutist). This was the first time a team of Canadian women medaled at the world championships. At the time, Olsen had about 800 jumps.

She later moved to the United States and finished eighth in the Hit'n'Rock competition at the Parachutists Over Phorty Society meet in Jordan in 1997. By 2003, she was living in Carbondale, Colorado and working as an emergency room nurse at Valley View Hospital. By that point she had 2,500 jumps and was training for the 2003 US Nationals, despite still having fewer jumps than many of her competitors. As an emergency room nurse, she well understood the dangers of her sport, but chose to focus solely on performing optimally on every jump rather than on the risks. She did not compete in the Nationals that year. She also served as Chief Judge in Style & Accuracy at the 2004 US National Skydiving Championships.
