= Minister of Statistics (New Zealand) =

New Zealand minister of the Crown

- Coat of arms of New Zealand

- Flag of New Zealand

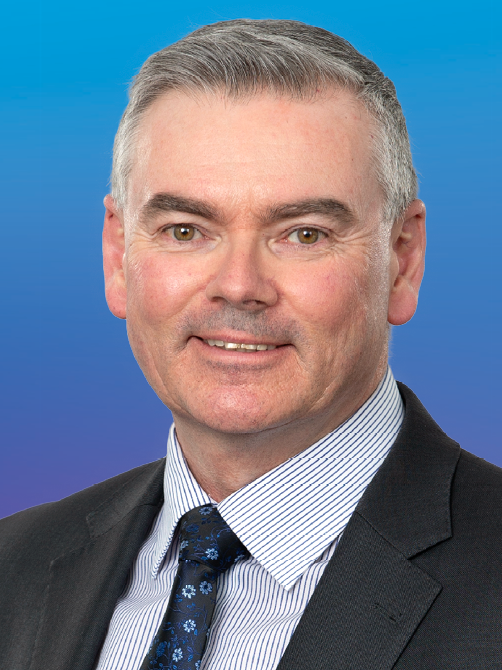
- Incumbent; Scott Simpson since 7 April 2026
- Statistics New Zealand
- Style: The Honourable
- Reports to: Prime Minister of New Zealand
- Appointer: Governor-General of New Zealand
- Term length: At His Majesty's pleasure
- Formation: February 1922
- First holder: William Downie Stewart Jr as Minister in charge of the Department of Statistics
- Salary: $288,900
- Website: www.beehive.govt.nz

The Minister of Statistics is a minister in the New Zealand Government appointed by the Prime Minister to be charged with the responsibility of Statistics New Zealand. The current minister is Scott Simpson.

== List of ministers ==
The following ministers have held the office of Minister of Statistics.

Key

Reform United Labour National Alliance Green

No.	Name	Portrait	Term of Office		Prime Minister
1	William Downie Stewart Jr		February 1922	27 June 1923	Massey
2	Richard Bollard		27 June 1923	25 August 1927	Massey
2	Richard Bollard		27 June 1923	25 August 1927	Bell
2	Richard Bollard		27 June 1923	25 August 1927	Coates
3	Māui Pōmare		25 August 1927	10 December 1928	Coates
4	Philip De La Perrelle		10 December 1928	22 September 1931	Ward
4	Philip De La Perrelle		10 December 1928	22 September 1931	Forbes
5	Adam Hamilton		22 September 1931	6 December 1935	Forbes
6	Walter Nash		6 December 1935	11 October 1936	Savage
-	Dan Sullivan; Acting Minister		11 October 1936	16 August 1937	Savage
(6)	Walter Nash		16 August 1937	13 December 1949	Savage
(6)	Walter Nash		16 August 1937	13 December 1949	Fraser
7	Jack Marshall		13 December 1949	26 November 1954	Holland
8	Jack Watts		26 November 1954	12 December 1957	Holland
8	Jack Watts		26 November 1954	12 December 1957	Holyoake
(6)	Walter Nash		12 December 1957	12 December 1960	Nash
9	Harry Lake		12 December 1960	21 February 1967	Holyoake
10	Robert Muldoon		4 March 1967	8 December 1972	Holyoake
10	Robert Muldoon		4 March 1967	8 December 1972	Marshall
11	Bill Rowling		8 December 1972	10 September 1974	Kirk
12	Mick Connelly		10 September 1974	12 December 1975	Rowling
13	Peter Wilkinson		12 December 1975	8 March 1977	Muldoon
14	Hugh Templeton		8 March 1977	11 December 1981	Muldoon
15	John Falloon		11 December 1981	26 July 1984	Muldoon
16	Bob Tizard		26 July 1984	24 August 1987	Lange
17	Margaret Shields		24 August 1987	2 November 1990	Lange
17	Margaret Shields		24 August 1987	2 November 1990	Palmer
17	Margaret Shields		24 August 1987	2 November 1990	Moore
18	Rob Storey		2 November 1990	1 July 1993	Bolger
19	Maurice Williamson		1 July 1993	10 December 1999	Bolger
19	Maurice Williamson		1 July 1993	10 December 1999	Shipley
20	Paul Swain		10 December 1999	13 November 2000	Clark
21	Laila Harré		13 November 2000	15 August 2002	Clark
22	John Tamihere		15 August 2002	15 October 2004	Clark
-	Michael Cullen; Acting Minister		15 October 2004	21 December 2004	Clark
23	Pete Hodgson		21 December 2004	19 October 2005	Clark
24	Clayton Cosgrove		19 October 2005	5 November 2007	Clark
25	Darren Hughes		5 November 2007	19 November 2008	Clark
(19)	Maurice Williamson		19 November 2008	1 May 2014	Key
26	Nicky Wagner		7 May 2014	8 October 2014	Key
27	Craig Foss		16 October 2014	20 December 2016	Key
28	Mark Mitchell		20 December 2016	2 May 2017	English
29	Scott Simpson		2 May 2017	26 October 2017	English
30	James Shaw		26 October 2017	6 November 2020	Ardern
31	David Clark		6 November 2020	1 February 2023	Ardern
31	David Clark		6 November 2020	1 February 2023	Hipkins
32	Deborah Russell		1 February 2023	27 November 2023	Hipkins
33	Andrew Bayly		27 November 2023	24 January 2025	Luxon
34	Shane Reti		24 January 2025	7 April 2026	Luxon
(29)	Scott Simpson		7 April 2026	Present	Luxon
