= Kevin Hague =

New Zealand politician

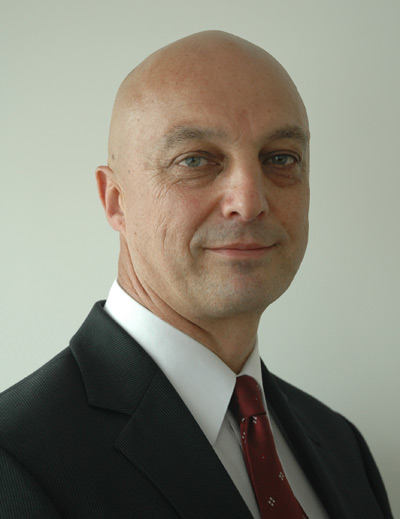
- Hague in 2008

Member of the New Zealand Parliament for Green Party List
- In office 2008–2016
- Succeeded by: Barry Coates

Personal details
- Born: 18 March 1960 (age 66) Aldershot, Hampshire, England
- Party: Green Party
- Children: One
- Occupation: Chief Executive of the Royal Forest & Bird Protection Society of New Zealand; Former Member of Parliament

Kevin Grant Hague (born 18 March 1960) is a New Zealand public servant, activist and a former politician. Since 2025 he has been chief of staff for the Green Party.

Hague was a Member of Parliament for the Green Party from 2008 to 2016. Previously he had been a human rights and gay rights advocate, the executive director of the New Zealand AIDS Foundation, and the chief executive of the West Coast District Health Board. His retirement from Parliament coincided with his appointment as chief executive of the Royal Forest and Bird Protection Society of New Zealand, a role he held until 2022.

== Early life and family ==
Hague was born in Aldershot, Hampshire, England, on 18 March 1960, and moved to New Zealand in 1973 with his family when he was 13 years old. His father, Charles, was a building inspector and his mother, Margaret, was an accounting assistant; he has two siblings. The family settled in Hamilton and Hague attended Hamilton Boys' High School, where he was on the student council and led a successful campaign to reinstate a school house system. He became a naturalised New Zealand citizen in 1978.

Hague studied mathematics and physics at the University of Auckland and was president of the Auckland University Students' Association in 1980. During this time, he was a member of the Young Nationals but later became interested in progressive Scandinavian politics.

Hague met his partner, Ian, in 1984 while protesting an upcoming New Zealand rugby union tour of South Africa, which was later cancelled. He previously lived on Waiheke Island for ten years, where he ran a bookshop, and now lives in Greymouth.

== Career and activism ==
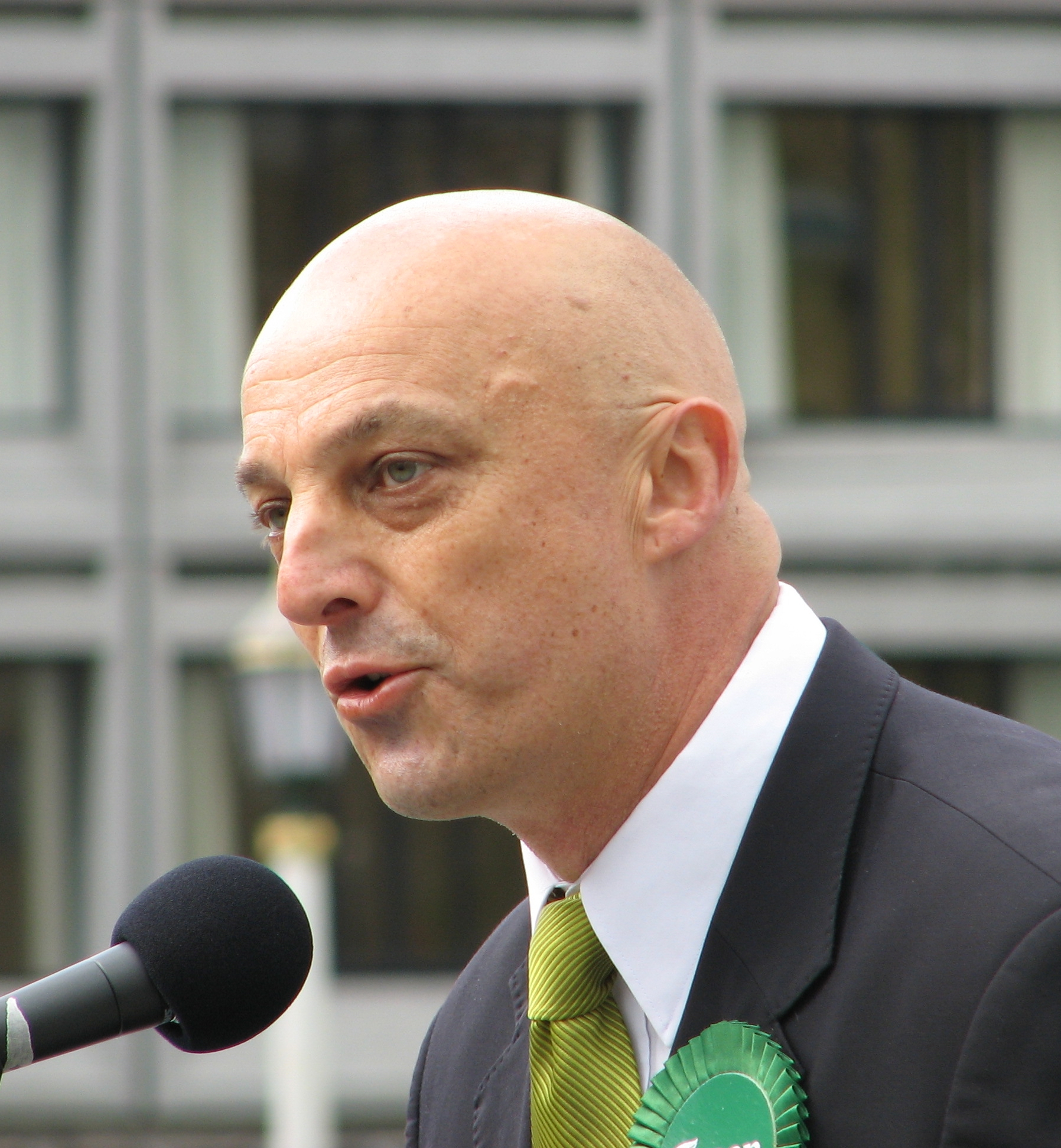
Hague during the 2008 election campaign

Hague has been an activist for a number of causes. In the 1980s he was heavily involved in the campaign against sporting contacts with apartheid South Africa. During protests against the 1981 Springbok tour, Hague was arrested five times, including after participating in a pitch invasion that caused the cancellation of a July match to be played in Hamilton, and he was concussed by police while protesting the September match in Auckland.

Hague is openly gay and in 1988 began work as a research officer for the New Zealand AIDS Foundation, which provides education on HIV/AIDS issues and advocacy and support for those with HIV and AIDS. He edited Terry Stewart's 1996 book Invisible families: a New Zealand resource for parents of lesbian and gay children.

From 1998 to 2003 he was the AIDS Foundation's executive director. As director, Hague criticised the 1999 government decision, promoted by immigration minister Tuariki Delamere, to ban HIV-positive migrants from entering New Zealand, saying it would be un-humanitarian. The ban was eventually lifted in 2021.

Hague served on the National Health Committee from 2001 to 2005 and chaired the Public Health Advisory Committee (a subcommittee of the NHC) from 2002 to 2004. He left the AIDS Foundation in September 2003 to become general manager for planning and funding at the West Coast District Health Board and became the board's chief executive in 2005. In 2007, he was appointed to the government's health quality improvement committee.

== Member of Parliament ==
New Zealand Parliament
Years	Term	Electorate	List	Party
2008–2011	49th	List	7	Green
2011–2014	50th	List	3	Green
2014–2016	51st	List	3	Green

Hague was selected as the Green Party candidate for the West Coast-Tasman electorate ahead of the 2008 general election. Dominion-Post journalist Vernon Small described him as one of the Greens' "impressive new candidates." Hague's candidacy followed several years of political activity with the Greens and unsuccessful attempts from both Labour and National to recruit him to stand for their parties. He finished third in the electorate contest but was elected to Parliament as a list MP for the Green Party, ranked 7 on the party list. He re-contested West Coast-Tasman in the 2011 and 2014 elections and was returned to Parliament as a list MP each time, being placed third on the Green Party list.

During his eight years in Parliament, Hague was the Green Party's health spokesperson and sat on the health committee. He also held responsibility for biosecurity, conservation, rural affairs, rainbow issues, and sport. He successfully campaigned against Meridian Energy's plans to dam the Mōkihinui River between 2009 and 2012, and advocated for reform of the Accident Compensation Corporation in 2012.

Hague had not supported the introduction of civil unions in 2004 because he did not think they provided equality for gay couples with heterosexual couples. He promoted gay rights in Parliament, speaking in favour of the revocation of the gay panic defence in 2009 and drafting legislation to legalise same-sex marriage and to improve adoption law, including for gay adoptions, in 2012. He organised political support for Louisa Wall's Marriage (Definition of Marriage) Amendment Bill, which legalised same-sex marriage in New Zealand in 2013. Hague said once the bill had passed its third reading, in April 2013, there would be a number of "incredibly emotional" weddings between gay couples. Later, he said he had accepted he "was wrong" about civil unions, believing that marriage equality would not have been possible without civil unions as a stepping stone.

Green Party co-leader Russel Norman indicated he would vacate that role in 2015. Hague contested the resulting leadership contest against first-term MP James Shaw. He was seen by commentators as the "safe choice" as the most experienced candidate with the strongest record in Parliament, but lost to Shaw in a 69–56 vote on 30 May 2015. Hague would later say that losing was "a blow." He announced on 5 September 2016 that he would resign from Parliament to become the chief executive of Forest & Bird. He was replaced by Barry Coates.

== Later career ==
Hague was chief executive of the conservation group Forest & Bird for six years from 2016 to 2022. He was succeeded by Nicola Toki.

Hague holds several health sector appointments made by the Sixth Labour Government, which came to power the year after he left Parliament. In 2019, he was appointed a member of the interim board of Te Hiringa Mahara, the Mental Health and Wellbeing Commission and later became its deputy chair. In 2022, following an appointment as chair of the West Coast Primary Health Organisation, he was appointed to chair the Takiwā Poutini Partnership. He was reappointed to the chair of the Public Health Advisory Committee in November 2022 for a three-year term.

In July 2022 he became a volunteer Civil Defence and Emergency Management controller for the West Coast.

In November 2025 Hague was announced as chief of staff for the Green Party.

== Bibliography ==
- Stewart, Terry (1996). Hague, Kevin (ed.). Invisible Families. Heartflags Pty Limited. ISBN 978-0-9805523-0-0.
- Yensen, Helen; Hague, Kevin; McCreanor, Tim (1989). Honouring the Treaty. Auckland, N.Z.; New York, N.Y., USA: Penguin. ISBN 978-0-14-012425-5.
