= Oddmund Hammerstad =

Norwegian military officer, businessperson and politician

Oddmund Håvard Hammerstad (born 15 August 1942), is a Norwegian military officer, businessperson and politician for the Conservative Party.

He was born in Sarpsborg. He finished his secondary education in 1961, attended the compulsory military service, took officer education at Heistadmoen and then the Norwegian Military Academy from 1963 to 1966. He was the best student in his class. From 1968 to 1973 he studied political science at the University of Oslo. He was an aide-de-camp in Brig. N. from 1966 to 1968, in His Majesty The King's Guard from 1968 to 1971, then worked in Industrivernet and Federation of Norwegian Industries from 1971 to 1975. From 1975 to 1979 he worked as a secretary for the Conservative Party, and from 1979 to 1981 as director of Handelens Servicekontor.

Hammerstad had been involved in politics as central board member of the Norwegian Young Conservatives from 1970 to 1972. From 1981 to 1986, during Willoch's First and Second Cabinet, he was a State Secretary in the Norwegian Ministry of Defence. From 1987 to 1992 Hammerstad chaired the Oslo Conservative Party. He served as a deputy representative to the Parliament of Norway from Oslo during the term 1989–1993, and from 1989 to 1990 he met as a regular representative, covering for Jan P. Syse who was Prime Minister. From 1991 to 1992 Hammerstad led the commission that delivered NOU 1992:31.

Hammerstad was the director of Rikshospitalet from 1987 to 1990, and board member of Medisinsk Innovasjon and chairman of Rikshospitalets Apotek during the same period. From 1993 to 2000 he was the municipal director of business in Oslo. He has later been CEO of PolyDisplay from 2000 to 2004, adviser in Oslo municipality from 2004 to 2007 and CEO of Fjord International from 2007. He was the deputy chairman of the Norwegian Defence and Security Industries Association from 2005 to 2007 and has written books on defence and intelligence. He was decorated with the Ordre national du Mérite in 1987.
