= Tawa, Dahanu =

Village in Maharashtra

Tawa
- village
- Location in Maharashtra, India Tawa (India)
- Coordinates: 19.8710859°N 72.9431038°E
- Country: India
- State: Maharashtra
- District: Palghar
- Taluka: Dahanu
- Elevation: 45 m (148 ft)

Population (2011)
  - Total: 1,905
- Time zone: UTC+5:30 (IST)
- 2011 census code: 551710

Tawa is a village in the Palghar district of Maharashtra, India. It is located in the Dahanu taluka.

== Demographics ==
According to the 2011 census of India, Tawa has 289 households. The effective literacy rate (i.e. the literacy rate of population excluding children aged 6 and below) is 65.21%.

Demographics (2011 Census)
	Total	Male	Female
Population	1905	1133	772
Children aged below 6 years	232	128	104
Scheduled caste	3	1	2
Scheduled tribe	1773	1054	719
Literates	1091	788	303
Workers (all)	1059	641	418
Main workers (total)	808	569	239
Main workers: Cultivators	295	178	117
Main workers: Agricultural labourers	97	60	37
Main workers: Household industry workers	15	9	6
Main workers: Other	401	322	79
Marginal workers (total)	251	72	179
Marginal workers: Cultivators	77	39	38
Marginal workers: Agricultural labourers	140	20	120
Marginal workers: Household industry workers	14	6	8
Marginal workers: Others	20	7	13
Non-workers	846	492	354
