= Michael Olsen =

Michael Olsen may refer to:

- Lee Michaels (Michael Olsen, born 1945), American rock musician
- Michael Peter Olsen (born 1974), musician and producer
- Michael-James Olsen (born 1994), Australian/American film actor
- Mike Olsen (born 1968), American stock car racing driver
- Mike Schæfer Olsen (born 1985), Danish musician and producer

== See also ==
- Michael Olson (born 1979), basketball coach
- Michael Fors Olson (born 1966), Catholic bishop
