= 2015 Green Party of Aotearoa New Zealand co-leadership election =

Leadership election within the New Zealand Green Party

- 30 May 2015
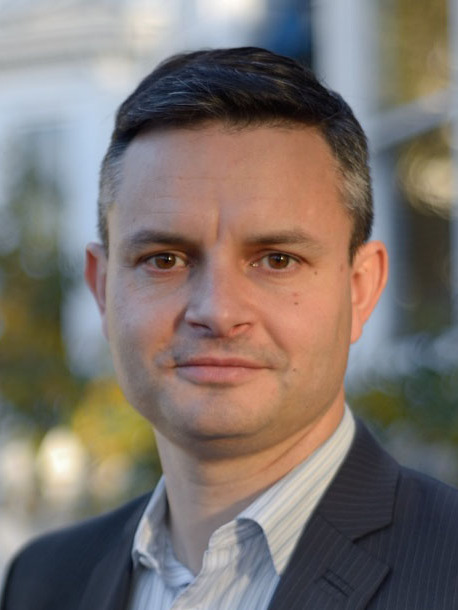

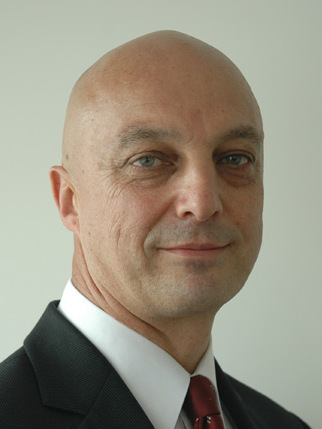
Candidate	James Shaw	Kevin Hague
Delegate count	69	56
Percentage	54.33%	44.09%
Co-leader before election
Russel Norman
Co-leader after election
James Shaw

The 2015 Green Party of Aotearoa New Zealand co-leadership election was held to elect a Green Party co-leader. The election was won on the first ballot by first term List MP James Shaw.

== Background ==
In January 2015, Russel Norman announced his intention to stand down as co-leader of the Green Party. This triggered an election to fill the now vacant male co-leadership.

== Candidates ==
=== James Shaw ===
James Shaw had been a List MP since 2014 and was ranked 12th on the Green Party list. He was the Greens' spokesperson for economic development, justice, trade and small business. He put himself forward as a candidate able to grow the Greens' party vote and strengthen its economic credentials in the minds of voters.

=== Kevin Hague ===
Serving as a List MP since 2008, a former Chief Executive of the West Coast District Health Board and ranked 3rd on the party list, Kevin Hague had the most experience of the four nominees. At the time he was the Greens' spokesperson for ACC, health, housing, rainbow (LGBT) issues. He was seen by commentators as the "safe choice" as the most experienced candidate with the strongest record in Parliament.

=== Gareth Hughes ===
A List MP since 2010, Gareth Hughes was ranked 5th on the party list. He was serving as the Green Party's Musterer (whip) as well as their spokesman for energy, mining, ICT, and science. Hughes (aged 33) was seen as a choice representing a generational shift and was seen as the strongest voice on environmental issues, a key area of concern for the party.

=== Vernon Tava ===
Vernon Tava was a member of the Waitematā Local Board, Green Party Auckland co-convener and was an electorate candidate for Northcote in 2011. Tava was pitched as an outsider (having never been an MP) and pledged a return to the party’s roots and core values as neither left nor right wing and placing the environment back at the top of party priorities.

== Result ==
The voting was conducted via an STV vote by 127 party delegates from electorates across the country. The following table gives the ballot results:

Candidate	Votes	%
James Shaw	69	54.33
Kevin Hague	56	44.09
Gareth Hughes	1	0.78
Vernon Tava	1	0.78
Majority	13	10.23
Turnout	127	—N/a

== Post-election ==
Shaw became the Green Party's third male co-leader and joined Metiria Turei in leadership duties. Shaw set himself the goal of making the Greens "more like modern New Zealand" and an ambitious target to expand the party membership to over 20,000. At the time the party had around 6000 members and he wished to double the membership of the party in a year, then double it again the following year. By the time of the 2017 general election, Shaw was the sole Green Party leader; Turei resigned her co-leadership following public scrutiny of her announcement that she had committed benefit fraud in the early 1990s.

Hague later admitted that losing was a "blow" and when he was approached by Forest & Bird, he decided to resign from the House of Representatives and take up the CEO role for that organisation instead. His resignation was announced in September 2016. Vernon Tava later quit the Green Party altogether believing the party had lost its way from environmentalism and was becoming "too socialist". He joined the 2017 campaign team of National's East Coast Bays candidate Erica Stanford.
