= Tava (soft drink) =

Carbonated beverage

- Type: Diet Soda
- Manufacturer: PepsiCo
- Country of origin: United States
- Introduced: 2008

Tava was a carbonated beverage fortified with vitamins and minerals, released by PepsiCo in the first half of 2008. It was marketed exclusively on the web.

Intended for health-conscious consumers, the beverage's nutrients included vitamins B_{3}, B_{6} and E, and chromium. Tava contained no calories and no caffeine, and instead of being called a "soft drink" was promoted as a "sparkling beverage." The beverage debuted with three flavors: Tahitian Tamure (Tropical Berry Blend), Mediterranean Fiesta (Black Cherry Citrus), and Brazilian Samba (Passion Fruit Lime). Production ceased in early 2009 because it wasn't popular enough.
