= Sustainable New Zealand Party =

- Leader: Vernon Tava
- Founded: August 2019
- Dissolved: 15 December 2021
- Headquarters: 5/66 Emily Pl, Auckland 1010
- Ideology: Green liberalism
- Political position: Centre

Website
- sustainablenz.org.nz

The Sustainable New Zealand Party, also called Sustainable NZ, was a political party in New Zealand. An environmentalist party, it had a focus on water, native species, and sustainable development. It contrasted itself with the larger Green Party by claiming to not be aligned with either side of the political aisle and being prepared to work with either the National Party or the Labour Party.

Waitematā Local Board member Vernon Tava came up with the idea of Sustainable NZ in early 2019 and the party was launched in November 2019. Mainstream media characterised the party as a "teal" or "blue-green" group, labelling rejected by Tava who insisted on characterising Sustainable NZ as a "green-green party".

On 15 December 2021, the party was deregistered and its logo cancelled at its own request.

== Creation ==
New Zealand's largest and longest-lasting environmentalist party, the left-wing Green Party of Aotearoa New Zealand, was founded in 1990 and first entered Parliament in 1996 as part of the Alliance, and later on its own in 1999. The party has been positioned on the left of New Zealand politics throughout its existence. After the 2017 general election, National suggested the idea of a National–Green Party coalition government that would have averted the possibility of New Zealand First in government; the idea was immediately dismissed by Greens leader James Shaw. Consequently, Vernon Tava departed from the party in an effort to establish an environmental party that could work with either major party and potentially always be in government.

== 2020 general election ==
Sustainable NZ applied for registration with the Electoral Commission on 15 November 2019 and was registered on 4 December. In February 2020, the former secretary to the party, Helen Cartwright, declared that she was asked to falsify membership records to get the party registered. Cartwright claimed she had audited the membership fees and found they were 35 short of the 500 required, but that Tava suggested the party edit the party's financial documents to cover the discrepancy. Tava said that the party had acted in full compliance with the Electoral Act. Cartwright says that the party has retained its registration because it ultimately did have enough members.

By February 2020, four months after founding, a small number of members had left the party, including party secretary Helen Cartwright and the party treasurer. Cartwright subsequently formed the Integrity Party of Aotearoa New Zealand.

The party received a broadcasting allocation of $53,840 for the 2020 election.

As of May 2020, the party had not registered in any public polling. By the end of September 2020, it had registered in only one of Colmar-Brunton's polls, receiving 0.1% of support in its mid-September poll.

The party stood 11 list candidates, of which 10 were also electorate candidates. It won 1,880 party votes, 0.1% of the total, and did not enter Parliament.

== Activities after the 2020 election ==
On 15 December 2021, the party was de-registered and its logo cancelled at its own request.

On 18 April 2022, Sustainable New Zealand was listed by Brian Tamaki as one of the parties he was seeking to join The Freedoms & Rights Coalition (TFRC), a proposed umbrella movement of New Zealand minor parties.

== Election results ==
=== House of Representatives ===
Election	Candidates nominated		Seats won	Votes	Vote share %	Position	MPs in parliament
Election	Electorate	List	Seats won	Votes	Vote share %	Position	MPs in parliament
2020	10	11	0	1880	0.1	15th	0 / 120

== See also ==
- Teal Deal
- Progressive Green Party (New Zealand)
