= Tava Olsen =

New Zealand academic

Tava Maryanne Lennon Olsen
- Born: 1969 (age 56–57)
- Education: Stanford University
- Spouse: Timothy Robert Olsen
- Children: 2
- Scientific career
- Fields: Supply chain management
- Workplaces: University of Michigan; Washington University in St. Louis; University of Auckland; University of Melbourne
- Thesis: Response-time approximations for multi-server polling models, with manufacturing applications (1994)

Tava Maryanne Lennon Olsen (born 1969) is a New Zealand academic specialising in supply chain management. She is currently a full professor at the Melbourne Business School, University of Melbourne.

== Academic career ==
After a 1994 PhD titled Response-time approximations for multi-server polling models, with manufacturing applications at the Stanford University, she worked at the University of Michigan and the Olin Business School at Washington University in St. Louis before moving to the University of Auckland, rising to full professor. From there she moved to the University of Melbourne as a full professor and Deputy Dean of the Melbourne Business School.

Olsen has spoken on Auckland-related infrastructure issues, including the question of whether to move the Port of Auckland (no) and whether to introduce road tolls (yes).

== Selected works ==
- Fry, Michael J., Roman Kapuscinski, and Tava Lennon Olsen. "Coordinating production and delivery under a (z, Z)-type vendor-managed inventory contract." Manufacturing & Service Operations Management 3, no. 2 (2001): 151–173.
- Wiler, Jennifer L., Richard T. Griffey, and Tava Olsen. "Review of modeling approaches for emergency department patient flow and crowding research." Academic Emergency Medicine 18, no. 12 (2011): 1371–1379.
- Frater, Michael R., Tava M. Lennon, and Brian DO Anderson. "Optimally efficient estimation of the statistics of rare events in queueing networks." IEEE Transactions on Automatic Control 36, no. 12 (1991): 1395–1405.
- Oh, Seong-Jun, Tava Lennon Olsen, and Kimberly M. Wasserman. "Distributed power control and spreading gain allocation in CDMA data networks." In INFOCOM 2000. Nineteenth Annual Joint Conference of the IEEE Computer and Communications Societies. Proceedings. IEEE, vol. 2, pp. 379–385. IEEE, 2000.
- Katok, Elena, Tava Olsen, and Valery Pavlov. "Wholesale pricing under mild and privately known concerns for fairness." Production and Operations Management 23, no. 2 (2014): 285–302.
