= Norm Olsen =

American football player (1914–1977)

Profile
- Position: Tackle

Personal information
- Born: December 1, 1914; New York City, New York, U.S.
- Died: October 18, 1977 (aged 62); New London, Connecticut
- Listed height: 6 ft 2 in (1.88 m)
- Listed weight: 220 lb (100 kg)

Career information
- College: Alabama

Career history
- Cleveland Rams (1944)
- Stats at Pro Football Reference

Norman Eugene Olsen (December 1, 1914 – October 1977) was an American football tackle who played one season with the Cleveland Rams. He played college football at the University of Alabama. He died in October 1977 at the age of 62.
