= Gareth Hughes (politician) =

New Zealand politician (born 1981)

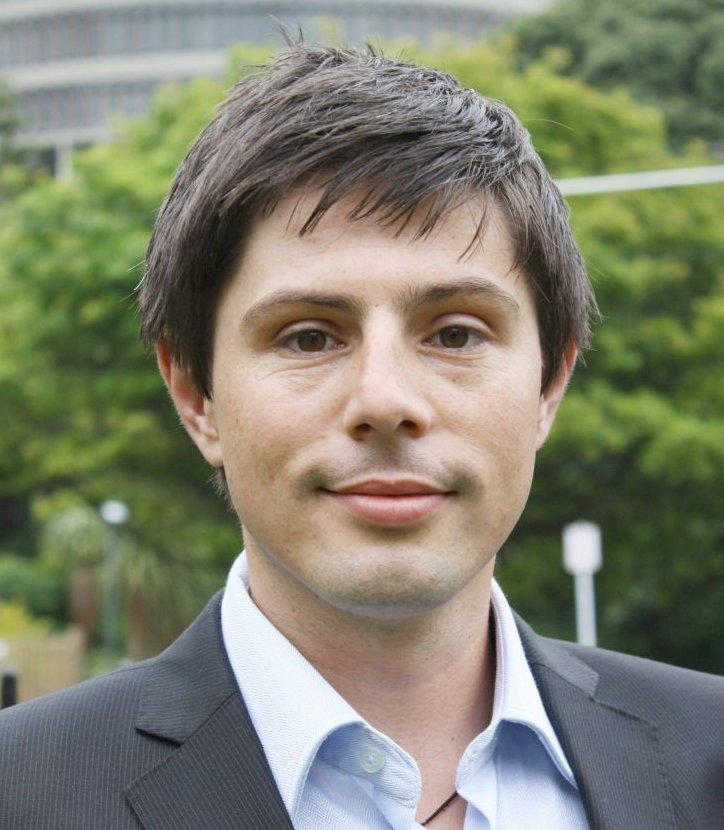
- Hughes in 2010

Member of the New Zealand Parliament for Green party list
- In office 12 February 2010 – 17 October 2020
- Preceded by: Jeanette Fitzsimons (Note: Normally, list MPs do not have individual predecessors or successors, but Fitzsimons resigned during a sitting parliament and therefore was succeeded by Hughes.)

Personal details
- Born: 31 October 1981 (age 45) Gisborne, New Zealand
- Party: Green (formerly)
- Spouse: Meghan Hughes
- Children: Two

Gareth Thomas Llewelyn Hughes (born 31 October 1981) is a New Zealand activist and a former politician of the Green Party. He was a member of the New Zealand Parliament for eleven years, from 2010 to 2020. He first took a seat part way through the 49th Parliament as the next person on the Green party list following the retirement of Jeanette Fitzsimons in February 2010. He did not stand for re-election in the 2020 general election.

== Early life ==
Hughes grew up in Gisborne. After attending Gisborne Boys' High School, he studied religious studies, history and politics at Victoria University of Wellington. He became a vegetarian while a student. He worked for Greenpeace in Australia and New Zealand from 2000 to 2005, and then worked for the Green Party on climate change issues. He is married and has two children.

In May 2004, Hughes was arrested after dressing as Ronald McDonald and chaining himself to the gates of McDonald's New Zealand distribution centre in Wiri, Auckland, protesting against the use of genetically modified chicken feed. In 2009 Hughes co-ordinated Greenpeace New Zealand's 'Sign On' campaign, which called for stronger action on climate change.

== Member of Parliament ==
New Zealand Parliament
Years	Term	Electorate	List	Party
2010–2011	49th	List	11	Green
2011–2014	50th	List	7	Green
2014–2017	51st	List	5	Green
2017–2020	52nd	List	5	Green

Hughes contested the 2008 election for the Green Party. Placed at 11 on the party list and campaigning mostly for the party vote, Hughes finished fourth in the Ōhariu electorate. The party did not poll sufficiently high for Hughes to be elected immediately, but he was declared elected after the retirement of list MP and former co-leader Jeanette Fitzsimons. Hughes was sworn in as an MP on 16 February 2010. He was the youngest MP in Parliament at the time of his election.

In his maiden speech on 24 February 2010, Hughes declared his support for a New Zealand republic. In his first term, Hughes was the Green Party's spokesperson on housing, ICT, libraries and archives, tertiary education, GE, food, oceans, transport, and youth.

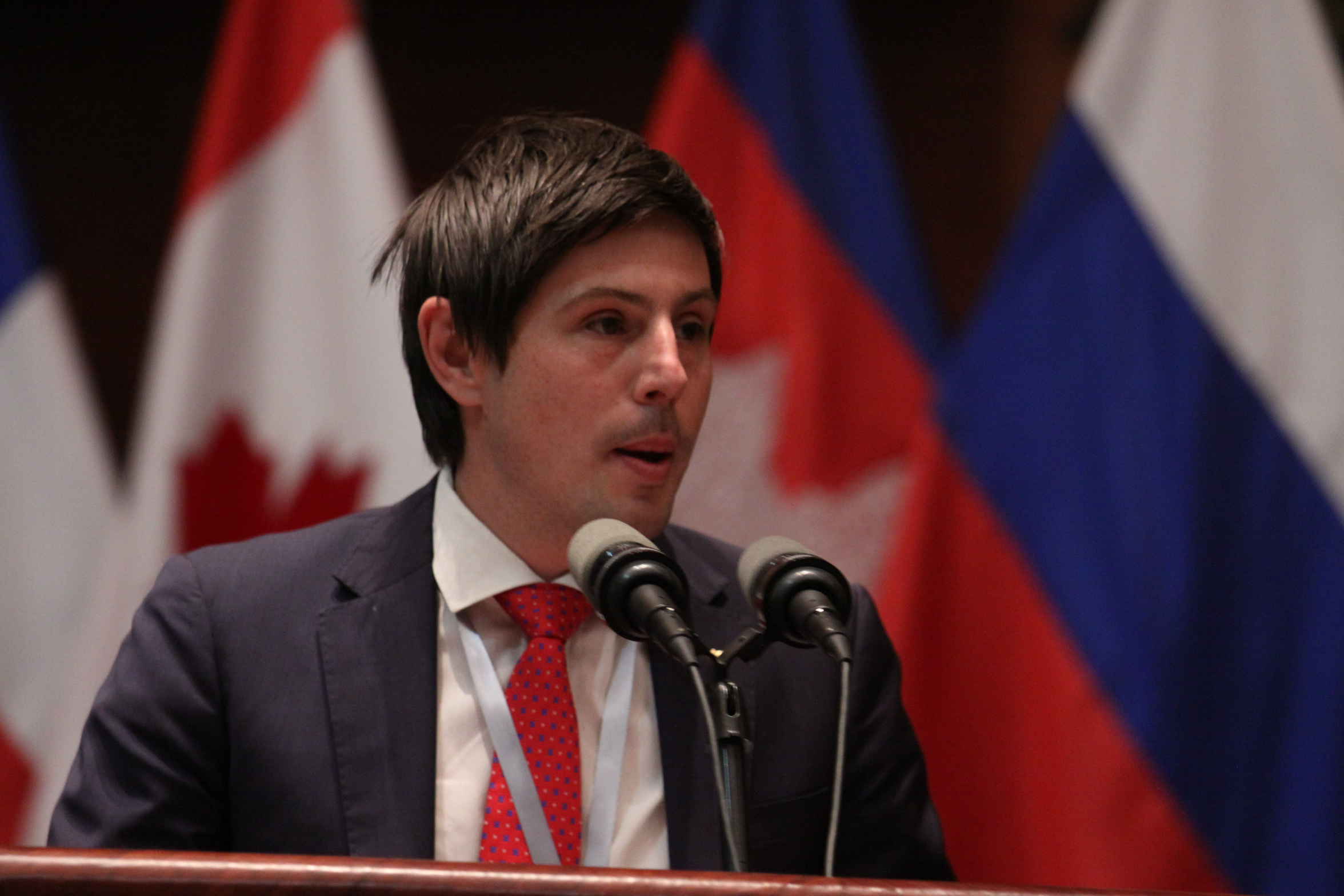
Hughes at the Asia Pacific Parliamentary Forum, 2015

In the 2011 general election he stood in the Ōhariu electorate again and was ranked seventh on the Green party list, and was re-elected as a list MP. In the 2014 general election he stood only on the party list, ranked fifth, and was elected for a third time. During this term of Parliament, the male co-leader of the Party, Russel Norman, resigned and Hughes stood for the vacant co-leadership role as the self-described "underdog." The contest was won by first-term MP James Shaw.

Hughes, along with the rest of the Green Party, voted in support of Marriage (Definition of Marriage) Amendment Act 2013, allowing same-sex couples to legally marry in New Zealand.

In November 2016, it was announced that Hughes would be running for the East Coast electorate against National Party MP Anne Tolley. This electorate is the one he was raised in. He was returned to Parliament as the Greens' fifth-ranked and longest serving list MP. When the Greens agreed to support a Labour–New Zealand First coalition Government, Hughes was not appointed to a ministerial position and instead continued as the party musterer (whip). In 2019, he announced his intention to retire at the next general election. Ahead of his retirement, and for family reasons, he relocated himself to be the Green Party's member of Parliament based in Dunedin.

== After Parliament ==
Hughes was elected chair of the Board of Directors of the animal rights organisation SAFE in 2021. He is the New Zealand lead for the Wellbeing Economy Alliance and no longer a member of the Green Party. Hughes wrote A Gentle Radical, a biography of Fitzsimons published in 2022.
