= John Olsen Hammerstad =

Norwegian born, American painter (1842-1925)

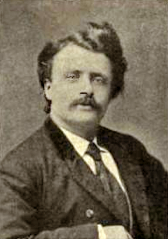
- Born: John Olsen Hammerstad; 19 April 1842; Kristiansund, Møre og Romsdal, Norway
- Died: 1925 (aged 82–83)

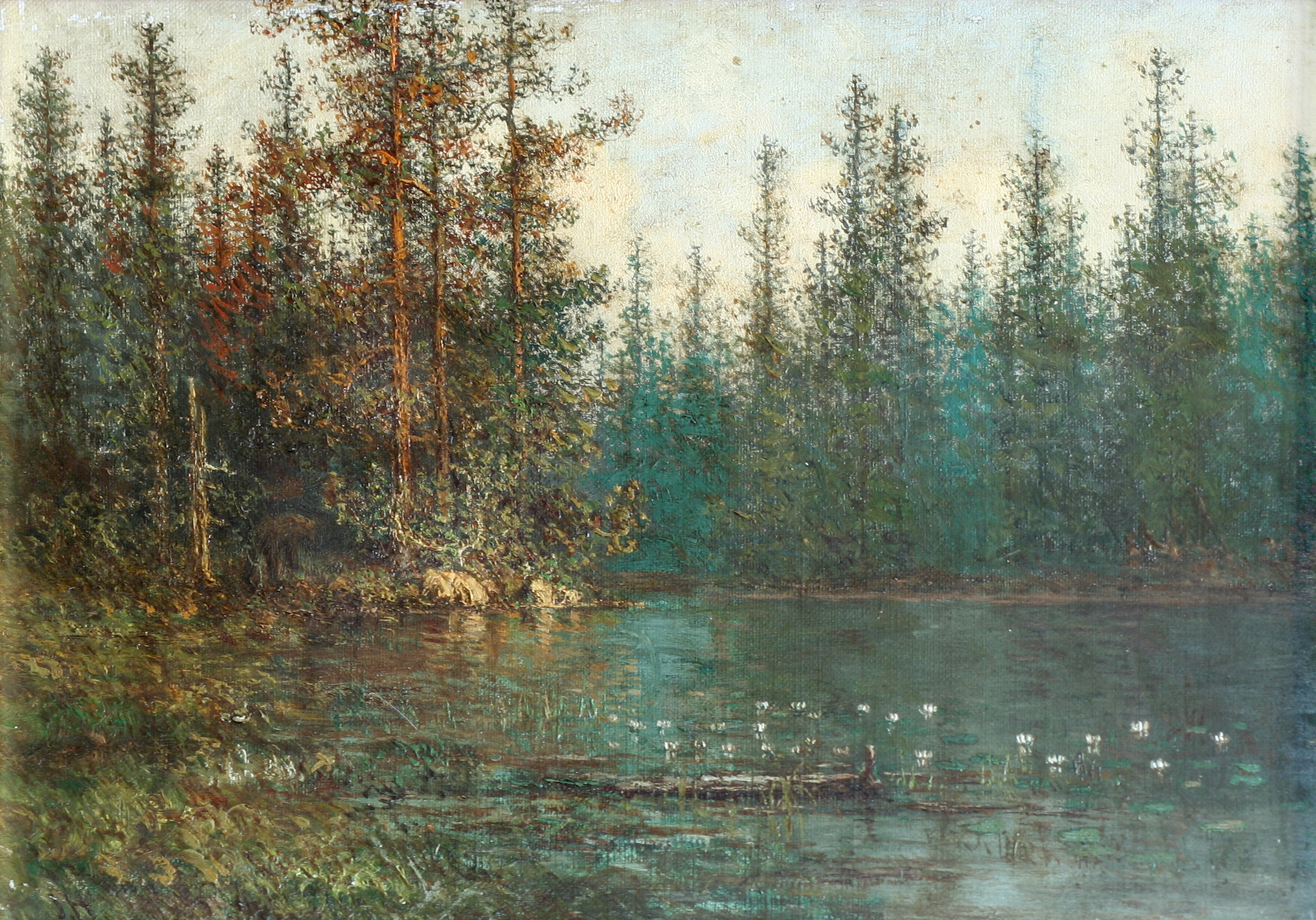
Woodland Pond by John Olsen Hammerstad. Oil on canvas

John Olsen Hammerstad (April 19, 1842 – 1925) was a Norwegian-born American painter who was active in the Chicago area during the late 19th and early 20th centuries.

== Biography ==
Johan Christian Olsen Hammerstad was born at Kristiansund, in Møre og Romsdal, Norway. He was the son of Ole Hammerstad and Magdalena (Schei) Hammerstad. John Hammerstad first served as an apprentice to a painter and decorator. From 1863 to 1866, he studied at Johan Fredrik Eckersberg's academy of painting in Christiania (now Oslo), Norway. Johan Fredrik Eckersberg, who lived from 1822 to 1870, was a representative of the late Romantic Düsseldorf school of painting.

Hammerstad emigrated to the US in 1869. Hammerstad was married to Agnes Klemp (1857-1948), daughter of Mr. And Mrs. Christian Klemp of Fredrikshald, Norway. They had four children and settled in Chicago, Illinois. He was considered to have been the first professional trained painter of Norwegian birth in the Midwest. Starting in the 1870s, Norwegian-American interest in fine arts developed in urban immigrant centers including Chicago, Minneapolis, and Seattle.

He was primarily known as a landscape painter, but also occasionally depicted such subjects as buffalo and boats. His works are characterized by realism and a striking use of light and color. Many were sold to Chicagoans to adorn their Victorian homes. His works still come up for sale with some frequency. Work by Hammerstad is among the holdings at the Fine Art Gallery of Vesterheim Norwegian-American Museum in Decorah, Iowa.

== Selected works ==
- Vinterbilde (1866) Oslo Kunstforening
- Solnedgang (1868) Oslo Kunstforening
- Fjordbilde (1869) Oslo Kunstforening
