= James Shaw (New Zealand politician) =

New Zealand politician (born 1973)

The Honourable James Shaw
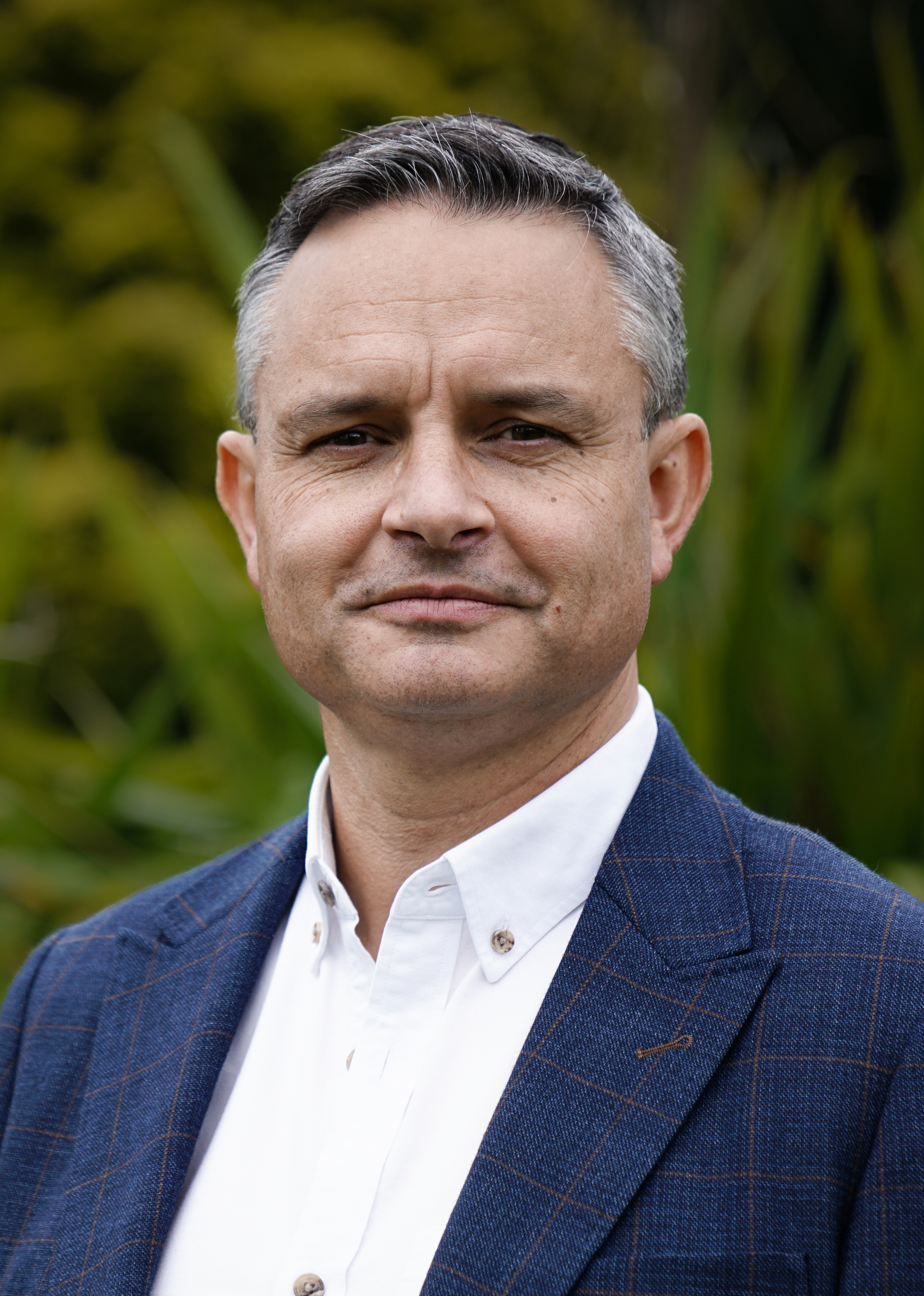
- Shaw in 2023

5th Co-leader of the Green Party
- In office 30 May 2015 – 10 March 2024 Serving with Metiria Turei (2015–2017); Marama Davidson (2018–2024)
- Preceded by: Russel Norman
- Succeeded by: Chlöe Swarbrick

6th Minister for Climate Change
- In office 26 October 2017 – 27 November 2023
- Prime Minister: Jacinda Ardern; Chris Hipkins
- Preceded by: Paula Bennett
- Succeeded by: Simon Watts

30th Minister of Statistics
- In office 26 October 2017 – 6 November 2020
- Prime Minister: Jacinda Ardern
- Preceded by: Scott Simpson
- Succeeded by: David Clark

Member of the New Zealand Parliament for Green party list
- In office 20 September 2014 – 5 May 2024
- Succeeded by: Francisco Hernandez (Note: Normally, list MPs do not have individual predecessors or successors, but Shaw resigned during a sitting parliament and therefore was succeeded by Hernandez.)

Personal details
- Born: James Peter Edward Shaw; 6 May 1973 (age 53) Wellington, New Zealand
- Party: Green
- Spouse: Annabel Shaw
- Profession: Management consultant

James Peter Edward Shaw (born 6 May 1973) is a New Zealand climate activist, businessman, and former politician. He was a Member of Parliament from 2014 to 2024, and a co-leader of the Green Party of Aotearoa New Zealand from 2015 to 2024.

Voters elected Shaw to the New Zealand parliament at the 2014 general election as a list representative of the Green Party. The party selected Shaw as its male co-leader in May 2015. Following Metiria Turei's resignation in August 2017, Shaw became the party's sole leader for the duration of the 2017 general election. From 2018 until his retirement he served alongside Marama Davidson.

In October 2017, the Green Party agreed to support a Labour-led government. Shaw became the Minister of Statistics, Minister for Climate Change, and Associate Minister of Finance (outside Cabinet). Following the 2020 general election, the Greens agreed to cooperate with the Labour majority government, and Shaw was re-appointed as the Minister for Climate Change.

Shaw retired from politics in May 2024. He is currently an operating partner at infrastructure management firm Morrison & Co, a strategic adviser to Sunshine Hydro, a director at Greenbridge Capital Management, a member of the Air New Zealand sustainability advisory panel, and a World Wide Fund for Nature New Zealand board member.

== Early life ==
Shaw was born in Wellington, and was primarily raised by his single mother Cynthia Shaw. When he was twelve years old his mother entered into a relationship with fellow teacher Susanne Jungersen. Shaw credits his two mothers for instilling him with his passion for politics and social justice. He attended Wellington High School (1985–1990) and Victoria University of Wellington. He later moved to London, living there for 12 years, before returning to New Zealand in 2010. Shaw completed an MSc in sustainability and business leadership at the University of Bath School of Management in 2005.

== Career before politics ==
Before returning to Wellington in 2010, Shaw worked in the consulting division at PricewaterhouseCoopers. Between 2011 and 2014, Shaw worked as both a consultant for HSBC bank on "environmental awareness programmes for future leaders" and also at Wellington social enterprise the Akina Foundation.

== Early political career ==
As a teenager Shaw attended a candidates debate in Wellington Central during the 1990 election. He found himself agreeing with the Green Party candidate Stephen Rainbow and decided to volunteer for Rainbow's campaign. At age 19, Shaw stood in the 1992 local elections in the Western ward for the Wellington City Council. Three candidates were elected, with Shaw coming seventh of ten candidates.

In the 2011 election, Shaw stood in the Wellington Central electorate, succeeding Sue Kedgley as the Green Party candidate in this seat. He came third in the candidate vote after Labour and National, but second in the party vote, beating Labour into third place. He was 15th on the 2011 party list and the highest-placed candidate who did not make it into Parliament.

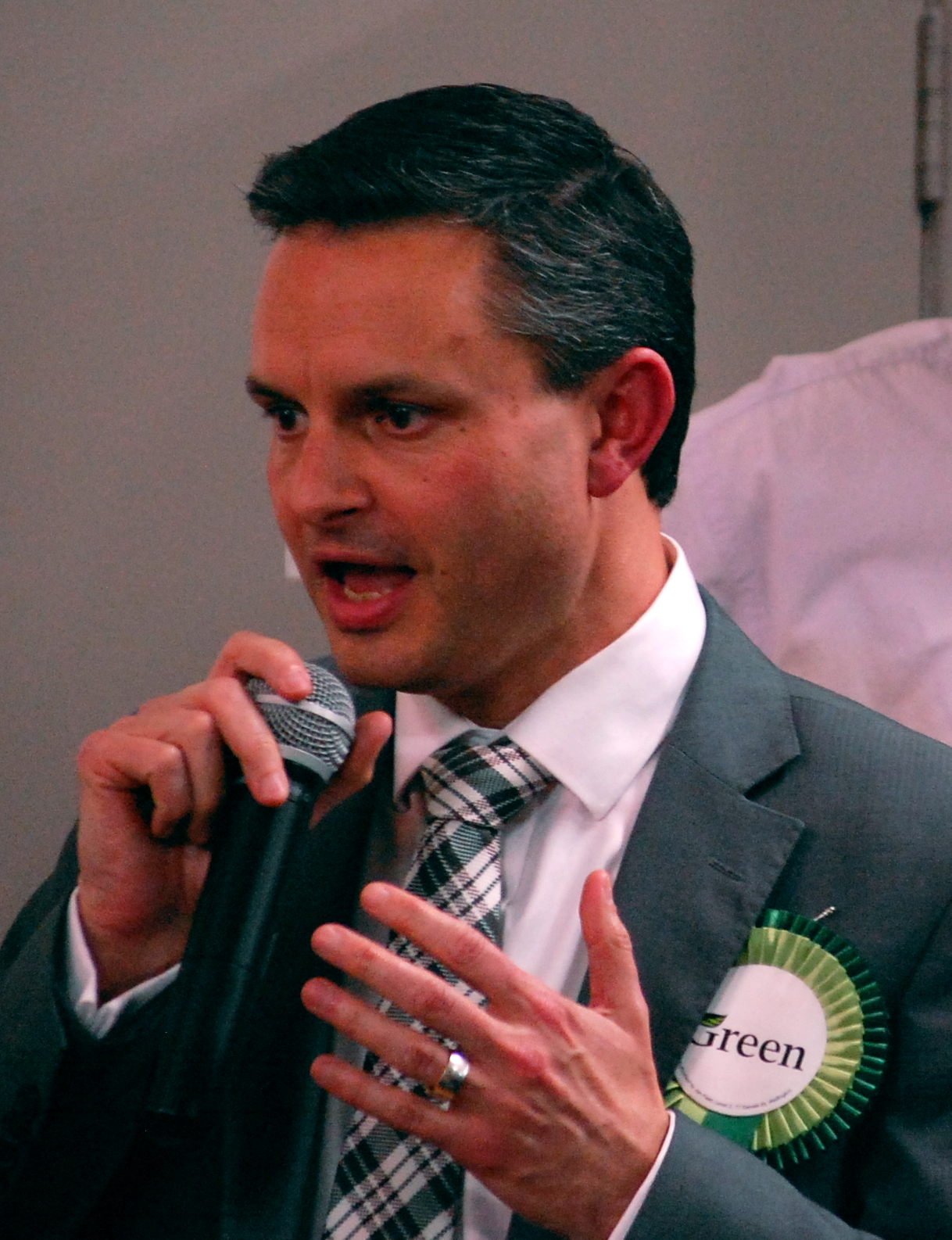
Shaw at the triennial Aro Valley candidates meeting, 2014

Shaw has said that in the 2011 Greens selection process, party members "didn't have a lot of time to get to know me" and disregarded him as "an ex-PWC management consultant in a suit". He says he has proved his worth to the party subsequently and was rewarded with a higher list ranking in both the draft and final party lists for the 2014 election.

Bryce Edwards said in The New Zealand Herald that Shaw represented "the more environmentally-focused, non-left side of the [Green] party – what might be called the New Greens faction – people who are more at home in the business world wearing corporate attire than amongst the far left. ... There will be many that see Shaw as a future co-leader of the party."

== First term in Parliament and ascension to leadership ==
New Zealand Parliament
Years	Term	Electorate	List	Party
2014–2017	51st	List	12	Green
2017–2020	52nd	List	1	Green
2020–2023	53rd	List	2	Green
2023–2024	54th	List	2	Green

Shaw was elected to Parliament for the first time as a Green Party list MP in the 2014 general election. He also unsuccessfully contested the Wellington Central, coming third place to Labour's Grant Robertson and National's Paul Foster-Bell with 5,077 votes. His first term in Parliament was the final term of the John Key and Bill English-led National Government. The Green Party, led by Russel Norman and Metiria Turei, was not part of the Government. Shaw was initially appointed as Green Party spokesperson for a selection of justice and business-related portfolios and made a member of the Justice and Electoral Committee.

Norman announced his retirement from the co-leadership position in January 2015, triggering a leadership contest. Despite having only been an MP for seven months, Shaw successfully contested the election against longer-serving MPs Kevin Hague and Gareth Hughes and extra-parliamentary candidate Vernon Tava. During the campaign, Shaw said that as co-leader he would try and connect with "the 28 per cent of voters that considered voting Green last year and didn't and remove all of the barriers that are currently stopping them voting Green". At the election held at the Green Party AGM on 30 May 2015, Shaw won 54 per cent of the delegates' first preference votes, compared to Hague who won 44 per cent (the other two candidates both won 1 per cent).

The day after becoming co-leader, he called for a cross-party consensus on climate change and said there was room for the Greens and National to work together on the issue. He also said in his first major speech that he wanted the Green Party to be "more like modern New Zealand", and expand its membership both in terms of numbers and to include a more diverse group of people.

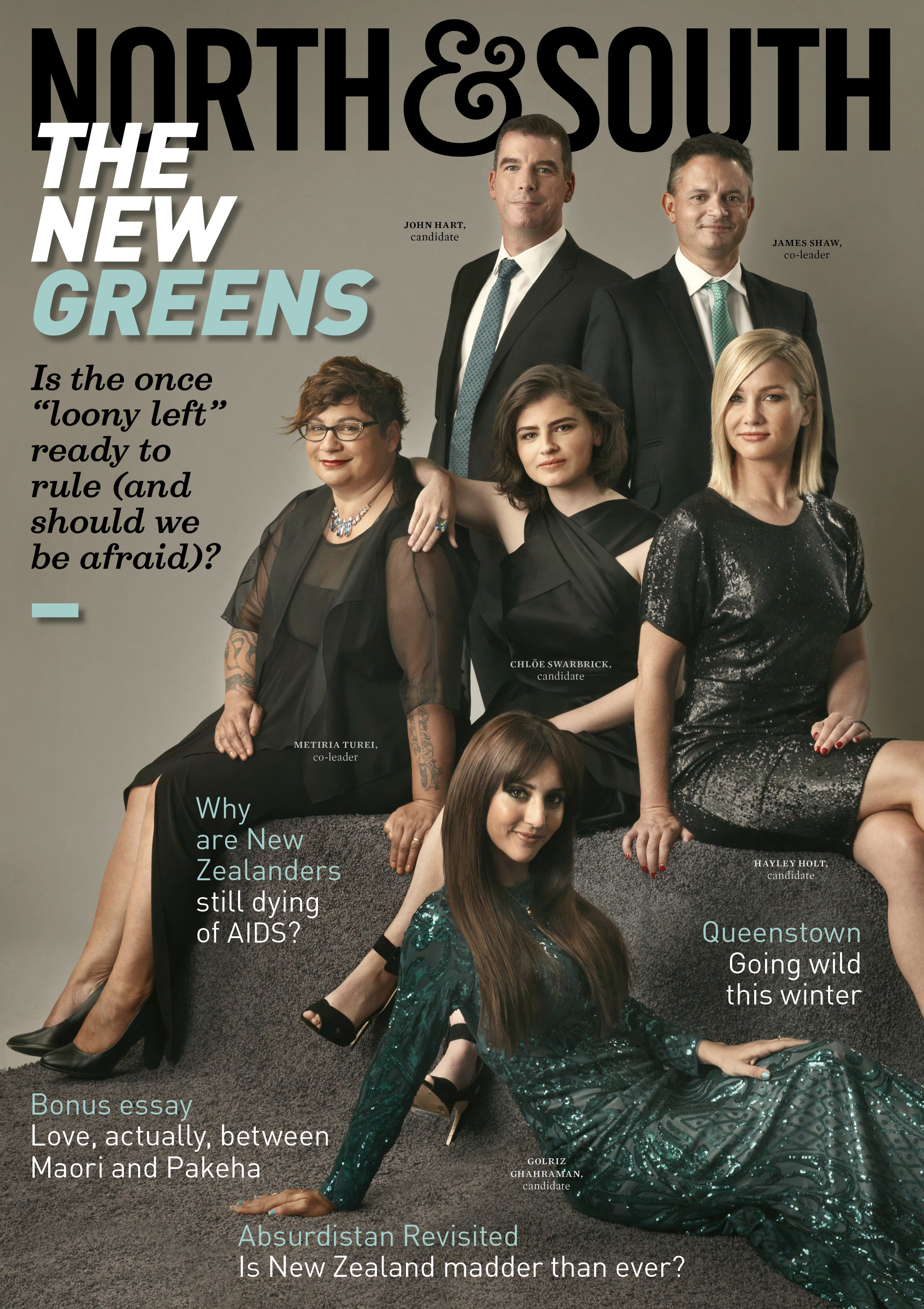
Shaw and "the New Greens" are presented as more mainstream than traditional perceptions of the party. North & South magazine cover, May 2017.

=== 2017 general election ===
The leadership pairing of Turei (a lawyer) and Shaw (a management consultant) pitched itself as a more mainstream, professional version of the party compared to previous incarnations which were associated with "being wacky, smoking dope, hugging trees and eating lentils." A Vanity Fair-style photoshoot presented the co-leaders alongside four new candidates on the cover of North & South magazine in May 2017. Despite this, the party launched "radical" policy reform to the New Zealand welfare system and tax system. In the policy announcement on 16 July, Turei admitted committing benefit fraud in the 1990s and later admitted to electoral fraud in the same period. Under pressure, she eventually resigned on 9 August, leaving Shaw as the Green Party's sole leader for the duration of the 2017 general election campaign.

As sole leader, Shaw relaunched the party's campaign in Auckland and a new slogan ("Love New Zealand") on 13 August. In September, Shaw launched the party's climate policy: a Zero Carbon Act with the goal of net zero carbon emissions by 2050, the establishment of an independent Climate Change Commission, and the replacement of the current New Zealand Emissions Trading Scheme with a Kiwi Climate Fund that pays an annual dividend of $250 to each New Zealander and is generated by taxing farmers for pollution.

The Green Party's share of the party vote dropped to 6.3%, resulting in eight MPs being elected. Shaw was re-elected on the party list. He also contested Wellington Central, coming third place to Labour's Grant Roberston and National's Nicola Willis.

Possible government arrangements after the election included a National/Green government, a Labour/Green/New Zealand First government and a National/New Zealand First government. Shaw ruled out cooperating with the National Party. New Zealand First also negotiated with National but decided to form a coalition government with the Labour Party, with confidence and supply from the Green Party.

== Minister in the Sixth Labour Government ==
=== Coalition Government, 2017–2020 ===
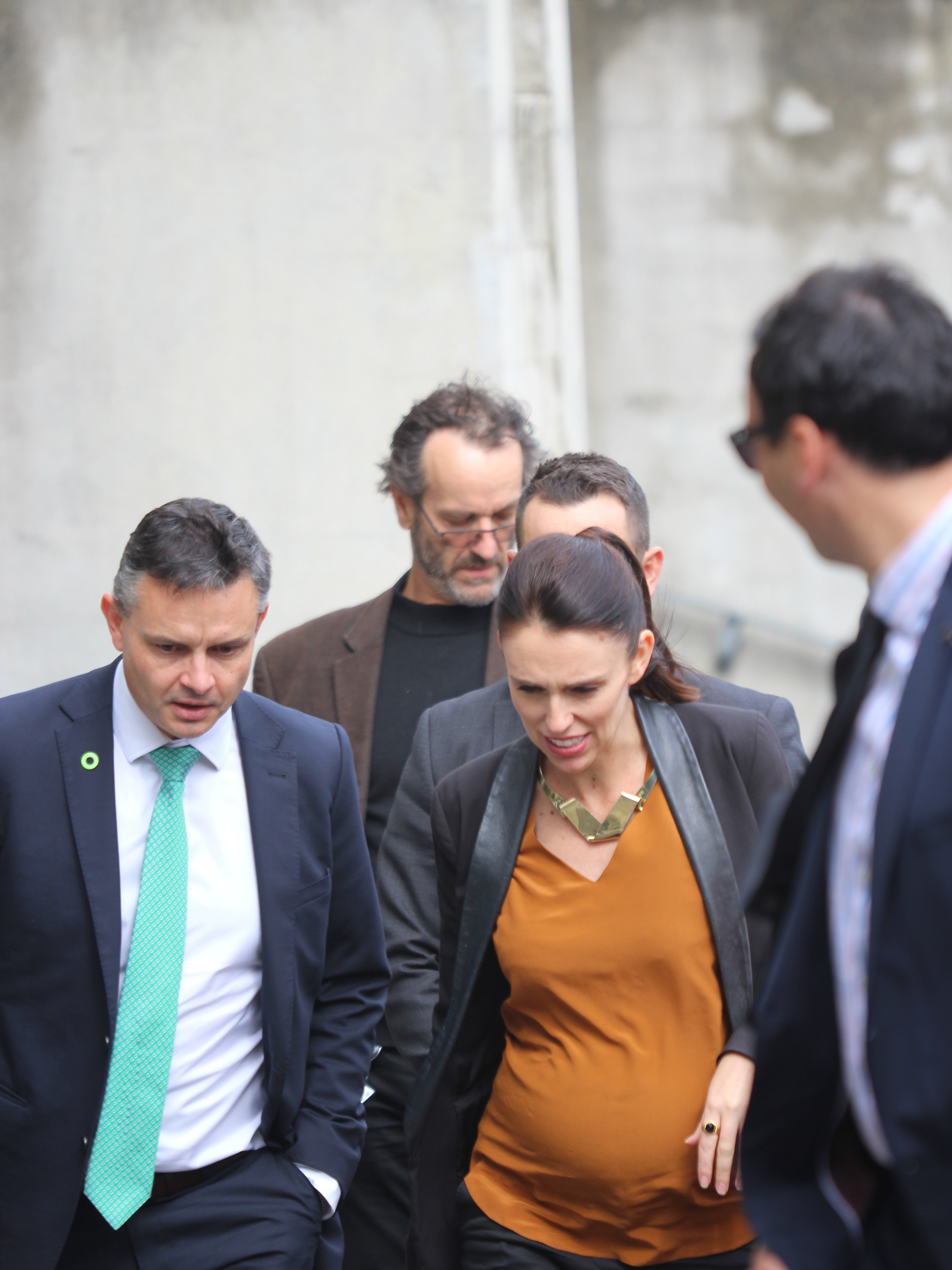
Shaw with Prime Minister Jacinda Ardern in Wellington, 2018

Shaw was appointed Minister of Statistics, Minister for Climate Change and Associate Minister of Finance (outside Cabinet) in the coalition government.

As Minister for Statistics, Shaw received criticism from National MP Nick Smith for the low response rate during the 2018 New Zealand census. Shaw attributed the lower response to a lack of Internet access particularly among the older generation.

In April 2018, Shaw as Minister for Climate Change expressed support for the Government's decision to end future gas and oil exploration, hailing it as the "nuclear-free moment of our generation." He also reiterated the Green Party's support for ending deep-sea oil and gas exploration, stating that "fossil fuels are not our future."

According to figures released by the Department of Internal Affairs, Shaw was the government minister to spend the most on air travel fares in late 2018. Shaw spent NZ$77,771 on international air travel fares during the period between October and December 2018 while Prime Minister Jacinda Ardern spent NZ$54,487 during that same period. Shaw clarified that these air travel fares had been spent on attending multiple international climate change conferences.

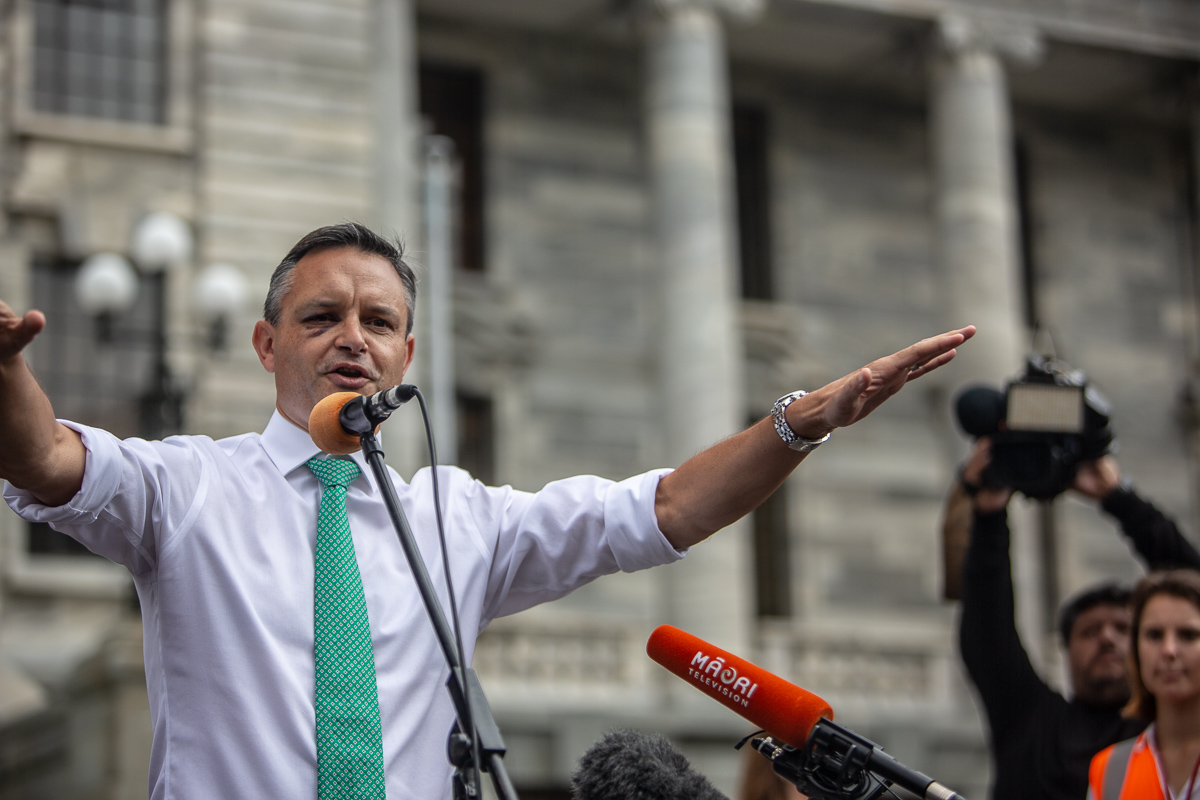
Shaw at the School Strike for Climate in Wellington, 2019

On 14 March 2019, Shaw was assaulted while walking to Parliament, sustaining a black eye and lacerations to his face. The attack was condemned by politicians from all sides of the political spectrum. Police confirmed that a 47-year-old man was arrested and charged with injuring with intent to injure in relation to the incident. During a press conference held the following day, Shaw expressed support for climate change school strikes held across the country calling for governments worldwide to take action on climate change. Shaw declined to give details about the assault, stating it was under police investigation.

On 8 May 2019, Shaw introduced the Climate Change Response (Zero Carbon) Amendment Bill into the New Zealand Parliament. The Bill subsequently passed its first reading on 22 May 2019.

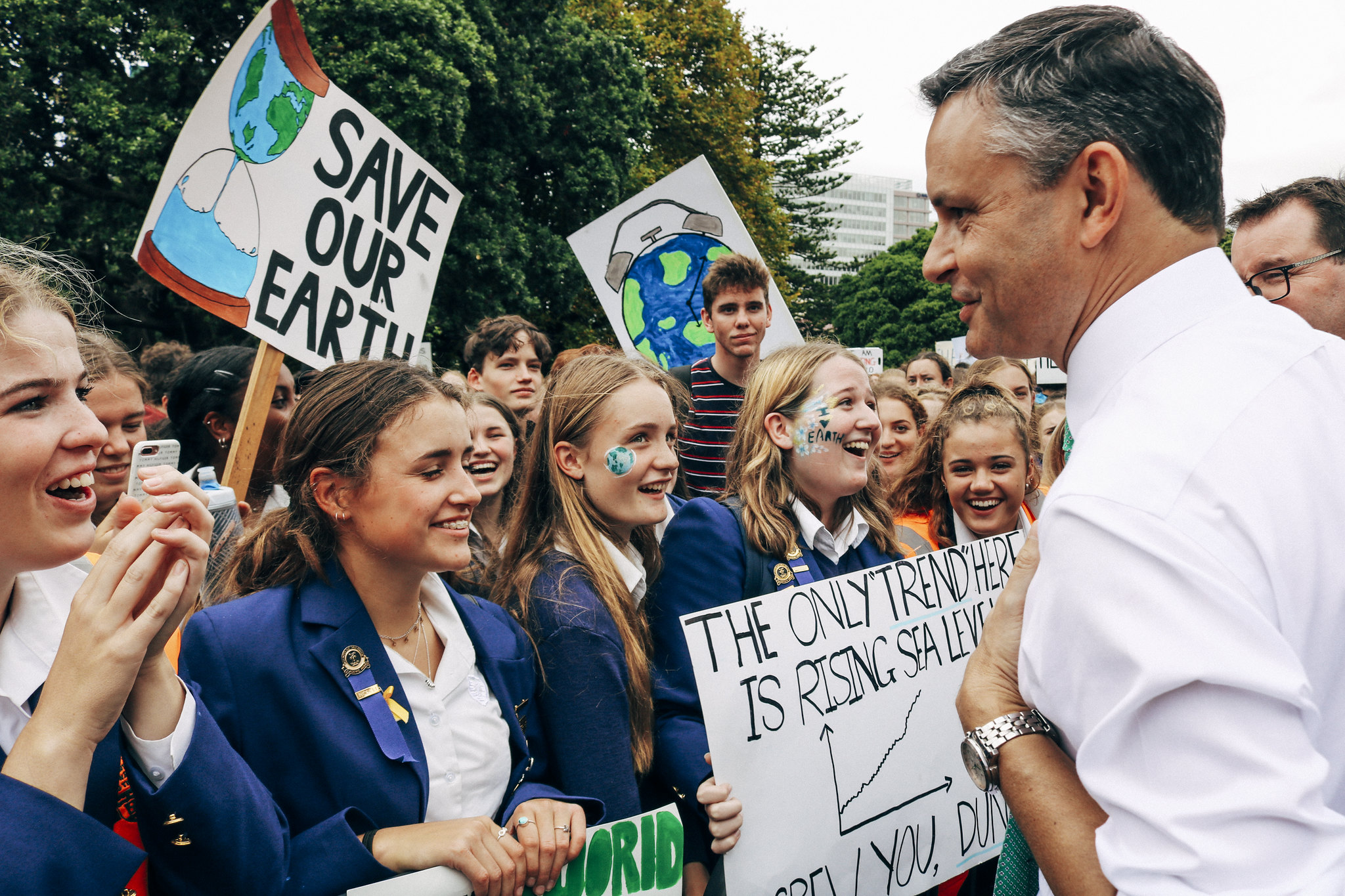
James Shaw at the School Strike for Climate Change, Wellington 2019

In late August 2020, Shaw attracted criticism from the opposition National Party, school principals, teachers unions' and members of his own Green Party after he approved the allocation of NZ$11.7 million from the Government's $3 billion COVID-19 "shovel-ready" recovery fund to the private "Green School New Zealand" in Taranaki. This funding boost violated the Green Party's own policy of opposing state funding being allocated to private schools. Shaw had defended the decision, claiming it would have created 200 jobs and boosted the local economy. Former Green MPs Catherine Delahunty, Mojo Mathers and Sue Bradford criticised Shaw's decision as a betrayal of the Green Party's policies and principles.

According to Newshub, Shaw refused to sign the Government's NZ$3 billion "shovel-ready" infrastructure fund until the Green School in Taranaki was approved. On 1 September, Shaw apologised for approving the funding of the Green School, describing it as "an error of judgment." Shaw has also apologised to Green Party members in a Zoom call. Representatives of the school have reportedly approached the Crown to convert part or all of the Government's grant into a loan. On 3 September, the Education Minister Chris Hipkins disputed Shaw's claim that he had given verbal approval to the allocation of NZ$11.7 million to the private Green School in Taranaki. On 2 November, it was reported that the owners of the Green School had reached a settlement for the Government's NZ$11.7 million grant to be converted into a loan; a development that was welcomed by local principals.

=== Cooperation agreement, 2020–2023 ===
During the 2020 New Zealand general election, Shaw was re-elected on the Green Party list. He also contested the Wellington Central electorate, coming third place to Labour's Grant Robertson and National's Nicola Willis.

Labour won an outright majority in the 2020 general election. Despite this, Labour and the Green Party agreed a "cooperation agreement" on 31 October 2020 that resulted in Shaw retaining the Climate Change portfolio and become Associate Minister for the Environment (Biodiversity).

At the 2021 party annual general meeting Shaw was challenged for the co-leadership by Dunedin climate activist and software developer, James Cockle. Cockle stated his unhappiness with the progress the Greens were making during the Parliamentary term and wanted the Greens to become a "major party" and cease being seen as "Labour's little helper" as was the case under the current leadership. Shaw responded, stating he was "quietly confident" he would be re-elected by party members. Shaw was overwhelmingly re-elected, winning 116 delegate votes with just four to Cockle.

In mid September 2021, Shaw attracted media attention after Prime Minister Ardern granted him and a team of nine diplomats spaces in the managed isolation and quarantine system to attend the upcoming 2021 United Nations Climate Change Conference summit in Glasgow. Shaw's planned trip to the Climate Change conference was criticised by National Party leader Judith Collins and ACT Party leader David Seymour for denying places to homeward bound New Zealanders seeking places in managed isolation.

Shaw was not reconfirmed by Green Party delegates in the annual party co-leadership confirmation in July 2022, triggering a leadership election. Shaw stated Ardern had confirmed that he would retain his position as Climate Change Minister regardless of any potential change to his leadership. Two days after the confirmation vote, Shaw announced that he would put himself forward to continue in the leadership role. On 10 September, Shaw was re-elected as Green Party co-leader by 142 (97%) of the 145 eligible delegates at the party's annual general meeting.

== Retirement from politics ==
During the 2023 New Zealand general election, Shaw was re-elected to Parliament on the party list. The Greens won a total of 15 seats.

In late November 2023, Shaw assumed the Green Party's climate change, finance, public services and regulation spokesperson portfolios.

On 5 December 2023, Shaw was granted retention of the title The Honourable, in recognition of his term as a member of the Executive Council.

In January 2024 Shaw announced that he would be resigning the co-leadership role, effective March 2024, triggering the 2024 Green Party of Aotearoa New Zealand co-leadership election. He remained a member of parliament in the short term to see some remaining legislation, a member's bill to amend the New Zealand Bill of Rights to include the "right to sustainable environment", through its first reading. The bill was defeated at its first reading on 10 April 2024. The following day, Shaw announced that he would retire from Parliament in early May 2024. He gave his valedictory statement on 1 May and his resignation took effect at 11:59 pm on 5 May 2024.

In 2024, Shaw joined infrastructure management firm Morrison & Co and investment management firm Greenbridge Capital Management. He became a member of the Air New Zealand Sustainability Advisory Panel and the New Zealand board of World Wide Fund for Nature. In 2025, he moved to Morrison's Singapore office.

== Political views ==
Shaw believes that the market can be reformed to incorporate sustainability within its normal operations. In an interview with the Aro Valley Valley Voice he put forward his views:

Shaw is one of the new breed of Green MPs who have no problem with leader Russel Norman's statement that the party is 'pro-market'. The fuss around that statement, he says, came from "people who are afraid of the word 'market' because of the switch to a free market economy over the last 30 years" – people, in other words, who don't understand that properly functioning markets can serve the wider good.

On 5 June 2020, Shaw and fellow co-leader Marama Davidson described United States President Donald Trump as racist in response to a question fielded by press gallery journalists in response to the protests triggered by the murder of George Floyd in late May 2020.

== Personal life ==
Shaw and his wife Annabel live in Aro Valley.

== Electoral history ==
=== Parliamentary elections ===
==== 2011 election ====
General election, 2011: Wellington Central
Notes:	Blue background denotes the winner of the electorate vote. Pink background denotes a candidate elected from their party list. Yellow background denotes an electorate win by a list member, or other incumbent. A ✓ or ✗ denotes status of any incumbent, win or lose respectively.						
Party	Candidate	Votes	%	±%	Party votes	%	±%
Labour	✓ Grant Robertson	18,836	49.15	+6.97	10,459	26.56	−8.01
National	Paul Foster-Bell	12,460	32.51	−4.96	15,128	38.42	+3.01
Green	James Shaw	5,225	13.63	−1.14	10,903	27.69	+7.08
ACT	Stephen Whittington	412	1.07	−1.21	462	1.17	−2.78
Legalise Cannabis	Michael Appleby	404	1.05	+0.05	161	0.41	+0.15
NZ First	Ben Craven	279	0.73	+0.73	1,132	2.88	+1.35
Pirate	Gynn Rickerby	277	0.72	+0.72			
Conservative Party of New Zealand	Paul Stipkovits	236	0.62	+0.62	270	0.69	+0.69
Libertarianz	Reagan Cutting	69	0.18	−0.01	40	0.10	−0.01
Alliance	Kelly Buchanan	52	0.14	+0.14	18	0.05	-0.003
New Economics	Laurence Boomert	44	0.11	+0.11			
Independent	Puhi Karena	32	0.08	+0.08			
Māori Party					278	0.71	−0.15
United Future New Zealand					256	0.65	−0.35
Mana					250	0.63	+0.63
Democrats					15	0.04	+0.03
Informal votes		411			153		
Total valid votes		38,326			39,372		
Labour hold	Majority	6,376	16.64	+11.92			

Electorate (as at 26 November 2011): 48,316

==== 2014 election ====
General election, 2014: Wellington Central
Notes:	Blue background denotes the winner of the electorate vote. Pink background denotes a candidate elected from their party list. Yellow background denotes an electorate win by a list member, or other incumbent. A ✓ or ✗ denotes status of any incumbent, win or lose respectively.						
Party	Candidate	Votes	%	±%	Party votes	%	±%
Labour	✓ Grant Robertson	19,807	51.64	+2.49	9,306	23.78	−2.78
National	Paul Foster-Bell	11,540	30.09	−2.42	14,689	37.54	−0.88
Green	James Shaw	5,077	13.24	−0.39	11,545	29.50	+1.81
NZ First	Hugh Barr	580	1.51	+0.78	1,399	3.58	+0.70
Legalise Cannabis	Alistair Gregory	353	0.92	−0.13	127	0.32	−0.09
Conservative Party of New Zealand	Brian Hooper	307	0.80	+0.18	590	1.51	+0.82
Internet	Callum Valentine	217	0.57	+0.57			
Independent	Peter Robinson	90	0.23	+0.23			
Democrats	James Knuckey	57	0.15	+0.15	26	0.07	+0.03
Independent	Puhi Karena	52	0.14	+0.06			
Internet Mana					578	1.48	+0.85 (Note: 2014 Internet Mana swing is relative to the votes for Mana in 2011; it shared a party list with Internet in the 2014 election.)
Māori Party					300	0.77	+0.06
ACT					274	0.70	−0.47
United Future New Zealand					117	0.30	−0.35
Civilian					49	0.13	+0.13
Ban 1080					20	0.05	+0.05
Focus					5	0.01	+0.01
Independent Coalition					5	0.01	+0.01
Informal votes		273			101		
Total valid votes		38,353			39,131		
Turnout		39,232	84.14	+2.33			
Labour hold	Majority	8,267	21.56	+4.92			

==== 2017 election ====
General election, 2017: Wellington Central
Notes:	Blue background denotes the winner of the electorate vote. Pink background denotes a candidate elected from their party list. Yellow background denotes an electorate win by a list member, or other incumbent. A ✓ or ✗ denotes status of any incumbent, win or lose respectively.						
Party	Candidate	Votes	%	±%	Party votes	%	±%
Labour	✓ Grant Robertson	20,873	49.26	−2.38	16,500	38.29	+14.51
National	Nicola Willis	10,910	25.75	−4.34	13,156	30.53	−7.01
Green	James Shaw	6,520	15.39	+2.15	9,198	21.34	−8.16
Opportunities	Geoff Simmons	2,892	6.82	—	2,538	5.89	—
NZ First	Andy Foster	797	1.88	+0.37	972	2.26	−1.32
Independent	Gayaal Iddamalgoda	161	0.38	—			
ACT	Michael Warren	131	0.31	—	330	0.77	+0.07
Independent	Peter Robinson	71	0.17	−0.11			
Independent	Bob Wessex	19	0.04	—			
Māori Party					225	0.52	−0.25
Legalise Cannabis					55	0.13	−0.19
Conservative Party of New Zealand					29	0.07	−1.44
United Future New Zealand					28	0.06	−0.24
Mana					14	0.03	−1.45 (Note: 2017 Mana Party swing is relative to the votes for Internet-Mana in 2014; it shared a party list with the Internet Party in the 2014 election)
Ban 1080					13	0.03	−0.02
Outdoors					11	0.03	—
People's Party					10	0.03	—
Internet					9	0.02 (Note: 2017 Internet Party swing is relative to the votes for Internet-Mana in 2014; it shared a party list with Mana Party in the 2014 election)	−1.46
Democrats					6	0.01	−0.06
Informal votes		194			72		
Total valid votes		42,374			43,094		
Turnout		43,166					
Labour hold	Majority	9,963	23.51	+1.95			

==== 2020 election ====
2020 general election: Wellington Central
Notes:	Blue background denotes the winner of the electorate vote. Pink background denotes a candidate elected from their party list. Yellow background denotes an electorate win by a list member, or other incumbent. A ✓ or ✗ denotes status of any incumbent, win or lose respectively.						
Party	Candidate	Votes	%	±%	Party votes	%	±%
Labour	✓ Grant Robertson	27,366	57.26	+8	20,876	43.4	+5.11
National	Nicola Willis	8,488	17.76	−7.99	6,937	14.43	−16.1
Green	James Shaw	8,381	17.54	+2.15	14,587	30.33	+8.99
Opportunities	Abe Gray	1,031	2.16	−4.66	1,790	3.72	−2.17
ACT	Brooke van Velden	865	1.81	+1.5	2,339	4.86	+4.09
Legalise Cannabis	Michael George Appleby	401	0.84	—	132	0.27	+0.7
Independent	Jesse Richardson	385	0.81				
New Conservative	Liam Richfield	401	0.45		204	0.42	+0.35
Advance NZ	Rose Greally	108	0.23		103	0.21	
ONE	Gina Sunderland	84	0.18		56	0.12	
Outdoors	Bruce Robert	76	0.16		27	0.06	+0.03
NZ First					537	1.11	—1.15
Māori Party					255	0.53	−0.01
Sustainable NZ					32	0.07	
Social Credit					18	0.04	
TEA					12	0.02	
Vision NZ					8	0.01	
Heartland					1	0.00	
Informal votes		47,401			47,914		
Total valid votes		47,787			48,090		
Turnout		48,090	88.97	+2.41			
Labour hold	Majority	18,878	39.5	+15.99			

=== Local elections ===
==== 1992 Wellington local elections ====
Western Ward
Party	Candidate	Votes	%	±%
Independent	Val Bedingfield	5,008	61.50	−5.81
Citizens'	Bryan Weyburne	3,343	41.05	
Citizens'	Andy Foster	2,910	35.74	
Green	Sheila Ahern	2,637	32.38	
Citizens'	Alfie Des Tombe	2,320	28.49	
Capital Action	Colin Robertson	1,997	24.52	
Green	James Shaw	1,820	22.35	
Labour	Frank Mackinnon	1,788	21.96	
Green	Alexander Ewing	1,553	19.07	
Capital Action	Ashley Lewis	1,050	12.89	
Informal votes		380	4.66	+2.78
Registered electors		16,103		

=== Leadership elections ===
==== 2015 leadership election ====
Name	Votes	Percentage
James Shaw	69	54.33
Kevin Hague	56	44.09
Gareth Hughes	1	0.78
Vernon Tava	1	0.78

==== 2021 leadership election ====
Candidate	Votes	%
James Shaw	116	82.85
James Cockle	4	2.85
Abstentions	20	14.28
Majority	112	80.00
Turnout	140	—N/a

Party political offices
Preceded by Russel Norman	Male co-leader of the Green Party; 2015–2024; Served alongside: Metiria Turei, Marama Davidson	Succeeded by Chlöe Swarbrick
Political offices
Preceded by Paula Bennett	Minister for Climate Change; 2017–2023	Succeeded by Simon Watts
Preceded by Scott Simpson	Minister of Statistics; 2017–2020	Succeeded by David Clark
