= Vernon Tava =

Businessman and politician

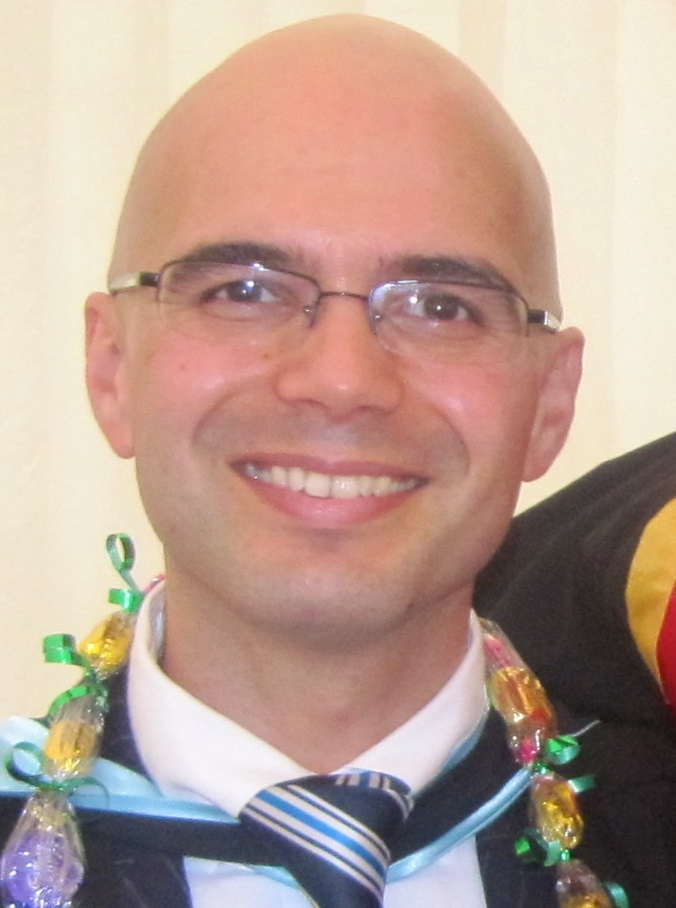

1st leader of the Sustainable New Zealand Party
- In office 10 November 2019 – 15 December 2021
- Succeeded by: Party dissolved

Personal details
- Born: 28 November 1977 (age 48) Sydney, Australia
- Party: Sustainable New Zealand Party (2019–2021)
- Other political affiliations: Green Party (until 2017); National Party (2018)
- Website: vernontava.com

Vernon Ivan Tava is a barrister living in Auckland, New Zealand. He is the founder and leader of the Sustainable New Zealand Party and a former candidate for the Green Party of Aotearoa, New Zealand.

== Education and business career ==
Vernon Tava graduated with a Master of Laws degree (LL.M) with first-class honours from the University of Auckland in 2011 and was awarded the Fowlds Memorial Prize (2010) for the most distinguished postgraduate student in law. He worked as a solicitor at the Grey Lynn Neighbourhood Law Office and Auckland Community Law Centre from 2013-2016. He was a business broker with Divest Business Sales from 2016-2020. He now practices law as a criminal defence barrister.

== Political career ==
=== Local-body politics ===
Tava lives in Auckland and served as a member of the Waitematā Local Board between 2013 and 2019, representing the left-wing City Vision ticket, which is affiliated with both the Labour and Green parties. He also served as a resource consent commissioner during his time as a local board member.

=== Green Party ===
Tava was a member of the Green Party of Aotearoa, New Zealand, until resigning from the party in late February 2017. While a member of the Green Party, he served as their Auckland co-conveyor, Standing Orders Convenor on the National Executive, and as their electorate candidate for Northcote in 2011. In 2015, Tava contested the Green Party's male co-leadership election. He campaigned on returning to the party's roots and core values as neither left nor right wing and placing the environment back at the top of party priorities. The male co-leadership contest was ultimately won by first-term List MP and former management consultant, James Shaw, with Tava coming third-equal with Gareth Hughes MP, both receiving one delegate vote each.

In late February 2017, Tava quit the Green Party, claiming that the party had strayed away from environmentalism and become "too socialist." During the 2017 New Zealand general election, he joined the 2017 campaign team of the centre-right National Party's East Coast Bays candidate Erica Stanford. Tava then sought the National Party nomination in the 2018 Northcote by-election. He did not make National's candidate shortlist.

=== Sustainable New Zealand Party ===
In 2019, Tava launched the Sustainable New Zealand Party, which he pitched as a centrist, sustainability-based political party. By February 2019, Tava had launched a website for his party and began soliciting members. Tava announced that his party was willing to work with both the Labour and National parties. Tava formally launched the Sustainable New Zealand Party in November 2019; with the party formally registered with the Electoral Commission on 4 December.

In mid-February 2020, the Sustainable NZ Party's former secretary, Helen Cartwright, alleged that Tava had suggested that they doctor membership records so that the party could meet the minimum membership threshold of 500 current financial members at the time of application for registration with the Electoral Commission. Cartwright and a small number of members resigned due to her assertion that the party lacked policies and funds. Tava denied Cartwright's allegations, asserting that the party had met the minimum membership threshold by the time the application was approved by the Electoral Commission.

In October 2020, Tava admitted that the woman featured in one of Sustainable New Zealand's online video advertisements (purported to be a small business owner named Jill) was actually an actor who was his partner, Julie. Tava rejected the notion that the ad was misleading and said he believed it was commonplace to use actors for political ads.

During the 2020 New Zealand general election held on 17 October, Tava, standing as the party's candidate for Auckland Central, obtained 120 votes with Sustainable New Zealand obtaining 59 party votes. Nationally, the Sustainable New Zealand Party won 1,880 party votes, in the 2020 election, or 0.1% of the total. On 15 December 2021, the party was deregistered and its logo cancelled at its own request.
