= Opinion polling for the 2014 New Zealand general election =

New Zealand political opinion polls

Opinion polling for the 2014 New Zealand general election has been commissioned throughout the duration of the 50th New Zealand Parliament by various organisations. The five main polling organisations are Fairfax Media (Fairfax Media Ipsos), MediaWorks New Zealand (3 News Reid Research), The New Zealand Herald (Herald Digipoll), Roy Morgan Research, and Television New Zealand (One News Colmar Brunton). The sample size, margin of error and confidence interval of each poll varies by organisation and date.

== Party vote and key events ==
Refusals are generally excluded from the party vote percentages, while question wording and the treatment of "don't know" responses and those not intending to vote may vary between survey organisations.

=== Graphical summary ===
The first graph below shows trend lines averaged across all polls for parties that received 5.0% or more of the party vote at the 2011 election. The second graph shows parties that received 1.0% or more (but less than 5.0%) of the party vote, or won an electorate seat, at the 2011 election. Parties which have polled over 1.0% since the 2011 election are also included.

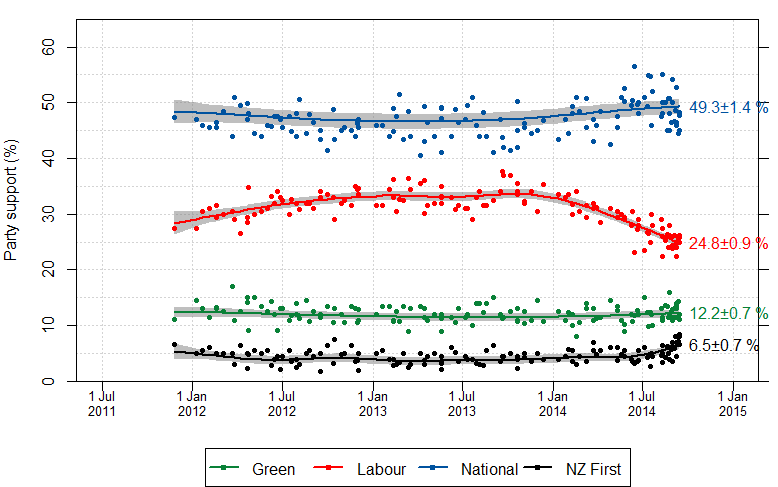
Summary of poll results given below up to and including 17 September 2014. For simplicity, only political parties that received 5.0% or more of the party vote at the 2011 election are shown. Lines give the mean estimated by a GAM smoother, with shaded grey areas showing the corresponding 95% confidence interval for the estimate. Figures to the right show the estimate from the smoothing line at the date of the most recent poll, with 95% confidence interval.

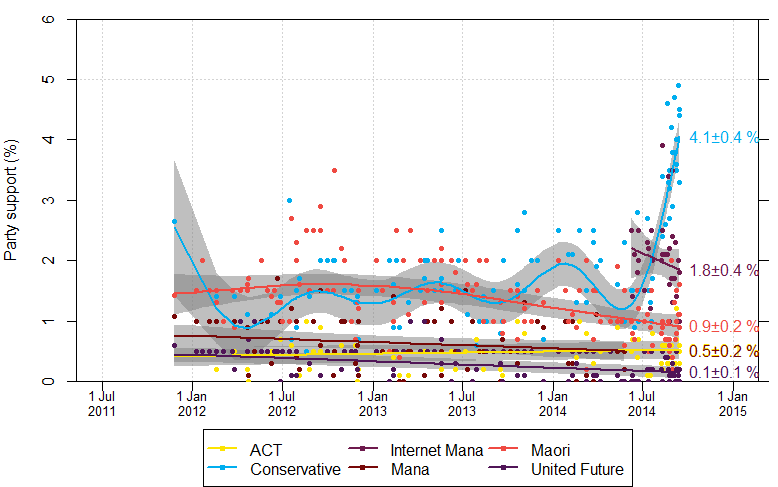
Summary poll results for political parties that received 1.0% or more (but less than 5.0%) of the party vote or won an electorate seat at the 2011 election. It also includes parties contesting the 2014 election which have polled over 1.0% since 2011.

=== Individual polls ===
Poll	Date (Note: These are the survey dates of the poll, or if the survey dates are not stated, the date the poll was released.)	National	Labour	Green	NZ First	Māori	Mana	ACT	United Future	Con	Internet	Internet Mana
2011 election result	26 Nov 2011	47.31	27.48	11.06	6.59	1.43	1.08	1.07	0.60	2.65	—N/a	—N/a
26 Nov 2011 – Don Brash resigns as leader of ACT over the party's low election result. 13 Dec 2011 – David Shearer replaced Phil Goff as leader of the Labour Party. 14 Dec 2011 – The Fifth National Government is sworn in for a second term, continuing their confidence and supply agreements with the ACT, Maori and United Future parties, but with a reduced seven seat-majority. 20 Dec 2011 – The 50th New Zealand Parliament is sworn in.
Roy Morgan Research	3–15 Jan 2012	47	27.5	14.5	5	1.5	1	0.5	0.5			
Roy Morgan Research	16–29 Jan 2012	46	30.5	13	5.5	2	0.5	0.5	0.5			
Roy Morgan Research	30 Jan – 12 Feb 2012	45.5	31	11.5	6	1.5	1	1	0.5			
3 News Reid Research	19 Feb 2012	46.5	29.4	13.3	5.0	1.3	1.3	0.2		1.4		
Roy Morgan Research	13–26 Feb 2012	45.5	31.5	13	5	1.5	1	0.5	0.5			
Roy Morgan Research	27 Feb – 11 Mar 2012	48.5	30	12.5	5	1	0.5	0.5	0.5			
21 Mar 2012 – Nick Smith resigns from his ministerial portfolios and Cabinet over his conduct in 2010 while Minister of ACC.
One News Colmar Brunton	24–28 March 2012	51	29	11	3.1	0.9	1	0.5	0.2	1.4		
Roy Morgan Research	12 Mar – 1 Apr 2012	44	30.5	17	5	1.5	0.5	0.5	0.5			
Roy Morgan Research	2–15 Apr 2012	49.5	26.5	12.5	6.5	1.5	1		1			
3 News Reid Research	22 Apr 2012	49.8	29.4	14.1	2.3	1.6	0.9	0.2		1.1		
Herald-DigiPoll	19–29 Apr 2012	48.1	34.8	9.2	4.9	1.7	0.1	0.0	0.7	0.1		
Roy Morgan Research	16–29 Apr 2012	47	28.5	15	5	1.5	0.5	0.5	0.5			
Roy Morgan Research	30 Apr – 13 May 2012	44.5	30	15	5.5	1	0.5		1			
24 May 2012 – Finance Minister Bill English delivers the 2012 budget, described for the second consecutive year as a "zero" budget. The National government aims to record a $197m surplus in 2014/15, down from $1300m in the 2011 budget.
Roy Morgan Research	14–27 May 2012	44	30.5	13.5	5	2	1	1	0.5			
One News Colmar Brunton	26–30 June 2012	47	33	13	2.2	1.3	1	0.7	0	1.4		
Roy Morgan Research	28 May – 7 Jun 2012	46	31	12.5	5.5	1.5	1		0.5			
3 News Reid Research	10 Jun 2012	45.8	33.2	14.4	2.8	1.4	0.3	0.5		1.1		
Roy Morgan Research	8–24 Jun 2012	47.5	32	12	4	1.5	0.5	0.5	0.5			
Herald-DigiPoll	18–25 Jun 2012	47.5	34.0	9.1	4.4	1.3	1.7	0.5	0.5	0.5		
26 Jun 2012 – The Mixed Ownership Model Bill, which allows the Government to implement its controversial "mixed ownership model" partial privatisation of four state-owned enterprises, passes its third reading.
Roy Morgan Research	25 Jun – 8 Jul 2012	45.5	32.5	13	4.5	1	0.5	0.5	0.5			
Roy Morgan Research	9–22 Jul 2012	47.5	30	11	5.5	1	0.5	1	0.5	3		
Fairfax Media Ipsos	19–23 Jul 2012	44.9	32.6	11.9	3.6	2.7	1.2	0.6	0.1	0.7		
One News Colmar Brunton	28 Jul – 1 Aug 2012	48	32	12	2.5	2.3	0.4	0.5	0.1	0.9		
3 News Reid Research	5 Aug 2012	50.6	30.8	11.2	3.0	1.6	0.2	0.1		1.7		
Roy Morgan Research	23 Jul – 5 Aug 2012	44	32	14	4	2	1	0.5	0.5	1.5		
Roy Morgan Research	13–26 Aug 2012	44.5	32	14.5	5	2.5		1		0.5		
29 Aug 2012 – Labour MP Louisa Wall's member's bill to legalise same-sex marriage in New Zealand passes its first reading 80 votes to 40.
Herald-DigiPoll	20–31 Aug 2012	47.9	32.0	10.7	5.5	1.5	0.3	0.2	0.3	1.4		
Roy Morgan Research	27 Aug – 9 Sep 2012	46.5	31	12.5	4.5	2.5	1	0.5		1		
One News Colmar Brunton	15–19 Sep 2012	45	34	12	1.8	2.9	0.6	0.9	0.1	2		
Roy Morgan Research	10–23 Sep 2012	43.5	33	11.5	5	2.5	1.5	0.5		2		
Roy Morgan Research	24 Sep – 7 Oct 2012	41.5	33.5	13.5	6.5	1.5		0.5	0.5	2		
3 News Reid Research	14 Oct 2012	48.8	33.0	10.6	3.2	1.5	0.1	0.1		2.0		
Roy Morgan Research	8–24 Oct 2012	43.5	29	13	7.5	3.5	0.5	0.5		2		
One News Colmar Brunton	27–31 Oct 2012	45	32	12	4.9	2.2	1	0.6	0.2	1		
Roy Morgan Research	29 Oct – 11 Nov 2012	45.5	32.5	10.5	5	2	1	0.5	0.5	1.5		
Roy Morgan Research	12–25 Nov 2012	45	31.5	13.5	6.5	1		0.5	0.5	1.5		
One News Colmar Brunton	24–28 Nov 2012	44	35	13	3.6	0.7	0.3	0.6	0.5	1.3		
3 News Reid Research	2 Dec 2012	47.0	34.6	12.9	2.0	1.2	0.1	0.2		0.7		
Fairfax Media Ipsos	28 Nov – 3 Dec 2012	46.2	34.4	10.5	3.8	1.3	0.6	0.0	0.2	1.4		
Roy Morgan Research	26 Nov – 9 Dec 2012	45.5	33.5	11	5	1.5	1	1		1		
Roy Morgan Research	2–14 Jan 2013	46	31.5	12	5	2	0.5	0.5	0.5	1.5		
Roy Morgan Research	14–27 Jan 2013	46	31.5	13.5	5.5	1.5	0.5	0.5		0.5		
22 Jan 2013 – Prime Minister John Key announces a cabinet reshuffle, promoting three MPs to Cabinet and dropping three others. 31 January 2013 – David Carter is elected Speaker of the House, after incumbent Speaker Lockwood Smith resigns from Parliament to become High Commissioner to the United Kingdom.
Roy Morgan Research	27 Jan – 10 Feb 2013	44	34.5	13.5	4	0.5	0.5	0.5	0	2		
One News Colmar Brunton	9–13 Feb 2013	49	33	11	3.9	1	0.5	0.1	0.2	0.9		
Fairfax Media Ipsos	10–14 Feb 2013	44.9	36.3	10.7	2.8	1.3	1.4	0.4	0.1	1.6		
3 News Reid Research	24 Feb 2013	51.4	32.6	10.8	3.4	0.4	0	0.1		0.9		
Roy Morgan Research	11–24 Feb 2013	47.5	30.5	12.5	3	2.5	0.5	0.5	0.5	2		
Roy Morgan Research	25 Feb – 10 Mar 2013	43.5	32.5	13.5	5	2	0	0.5	0.5	2		
Herald-DigiPoll	11–17 Mar 2013	48.5	36.4	9.0	2.5	1.1	0.5	0.1		1.3		
Roy Morgan Research	11–24 Mar 2013	44	34.5	13	3	2.5	0.5	0.5	1	1		
Roy Morgan Research	1–14 Apr 2013	40.5	35.5	13.5	5	2	0.5	0.5	0.5	1.5		
17 Apr 2013 – Labour MP Louisa Wall's member's bill to legalise same-sex marriage in New Zealand passes its final reading 77 votes to 44. 18 April 2013 – Labour and the Greens make their first joint policy announcement, NZ Power, a single buyer of electricity
3 News Reid Research	13–18 Apr 2013	49.4	30.2	11.5	3.8	1.0	1.0	0.5		2.0		
One News Colmar Brunton	14–18 Apr 2013	43	36	13	3.0	1.3	0.1	0.1	1.0	1.7		
Roy Morgan Research	15–28 Apr 2013	46.5	31.5	11	4.5	1.5	1	0.5	0.5	2		
29 Apr 2013 – Sitting MP Parekura Horomia (Labour, Ikaroa-Rawhiti) dies from health complications, aged 62.
Roy Morgan Research	29 Apr – 12 May 2013	44	32	12	5	2	1	1.5	0.5	1.5		
10 May 2013 – 49 percent of Mighty River Power is floated on the stock exchange in the first "mixed ownership model" float. The share issue price is set at $2.50, below the government's expected $2.70 to $2.80. 16 May 2013 – Finance Minister Bill English delivers the 2013 budget. The government revised its expected 2014/15 surplus to $75m.
One News Colmar Brunton	18–22 May 2013	49	33	9	3.6	1.3	1.2	0.3	0.7	1.7		
3 News Reid Research	17–23 May 2013	47.1	33.1	12.0	2.2	2.2	0.5	0.2		1.5		
Fairfax Media Ipsos	19–23 May 2013	49.1	31.9	11.2	3.2	1.6	0.1	0.1	0.3	1.6		
Roy Morgan Research	13–26 May 2013	41	35	12	4.5	2	0.5	0.5		2.5		
24 May 2013 – Mighty River Power's share price on the NZX falls below its $2.50 listing price. As of 28 August 2014, it has not traded above its listing price since. 31 May 2013 – United Future is de-registered as a political party by the Electoral Commission after it cannot prove it had at least 500 financial members.
Roy Morgan Research	3–16 Jun 2013	44	33	11.5	6	2	1	0.5	0	2		
Herald-DigiPoll	12–23 Jun 2013	48.8	30.9	10.5	5.1	1.8	0.5	0.2	0.3	1.5		
19 Jun 2013 – Green Party announces u-turn on quantitative easing policy.
Roy Morgan Research	17–30 Jun 2013	46.5	31.5	13	3.5	1.5	0.5		0.5	2		
29 Jun 2013 – Ikaroa-Rawhiti by-election: Meka Whaitiri wins the by-election and retains the electorate for Labour. The Mana Party comes second and the Māori Party third (National did not field a candidate).
Roy Morgan Research	1–14 Jul 2013	47	31	11.5	4.5	2	1.5	0.5		1.5		
3 News Reid Research	9–14 Jul 2013	49.5	31.0	12.0	3.9	1.6	0.2	0.2		1.1		
Roy Morgan Research	15–28 Jul 2013	51	29	10	4	1.5	1	1	0	1.5		
One News Colmar Brunton	27–31 Jul 2013	46	33	14	3.3	1.6	0.2	0.7	0.2	0.6		
1 Aug 2013 – The controversial GCSB Amendment Bill passes its second reading.
Roy Morgan Research	29 Jul – 11 Aug 2013	44	34	14	3	2	0.5	0.5		1		
Fairfax Media Ipsos	10–15 Aug 2013	48.3	31.6	12.3	2.8	1.0	0.5	0.2		1.4		
13 Aug 2013 – United Future is re-registered by the Electoral Commission after confirming it had 500 financial members. 21 August 2013 – The controversial GCSB Amendment Bill passes its third reading and becomes law. 22 August 2013 – David Shearer announced his intention to step down as leader of the Labour Party.
Roy Morgan Research	12–25 Aug 2013	44	31.5	14	5.5	2	0.5	0.5	0.5	1		
Roy Morgan Research	26 Aug – 8 Sep 2013	41	32.5	15	6.5	1	0.5	1	0.5	1.5		
15 Sep 2013 – David Cunliffe is elected as leader of the Labour Party.
One News Colmar Brunton	14–18 Sep 2013	47	34	12	3.6	1.3	0	0.2	0.3	0.8		
Herald-DigiPoll	17–23 Sep 2013	43.7	37.7	11.3	4.4	0.8	0.7	0.1	0	1.0		
Roy Morgan Research	16–29 Sep 2013	42	37	11.5	4.5	1	0.5	0.5	0.5	2		
Roy Morgan Research	30 Sep – 13 Oct 2013	41.5	37	12.5	5	1.5	0.5	0.5		0.5		
12 Oct 2013 – 2013 local body elections: Sitting MP Lianne Dalziel (Labour, Christchurch East) wins the Christchurch mayoralty and subsequently resigns from Parliament.
Fairfax Media Ipsos	19–23 Oct 2013	50.2	33.6	10.7	2.3	0.7	0.7	0.1	0.1	0.7		
One News Colmar Brunton	19–23 Oct 2013	45	34	13	3.9	1.4	0.3	0.5	0.1	1.6		
Roy Morgan Research	14–27 Oct 2013	42	35.5	11	4.5	1.5	0.5	1	0.5	2.5		
3 News Reid Research	3–7 Nov 2013	46.3	32.2	10.4	4.2	1.2	1.3	0.8	0.1	2.8		
Roy Morgan Research	28 Oct – 10 Nov 2013	45.5	32	12.5	5	1	1		0.5	1.5		
Roy Morgan Research	11–24 Nov 2013	44.5	34	11	3.5	1	1	0.5	0.5	2		
30 Nov 2013 – Christchurch East by-election: Poto Williams wins the by-election, retaining the electorate for Labour with 61% of the vote. National comes second, the Green Party third, and the Conservative Party fourth.
Roy Morgan Research	25 Nov – 8 Dec 2013	45	30.5	14.5	5	1.5	1			2		
Herald-DigiPoll	9–17 Dec 2013	46.8	35.4	10.8	3.9	1.3	0.9	0	0	0.7		
Roy Morgan Research	6–19 Jan 2014	43.5	33.5	12.5	4	2	0.5		0.5	2.5		
3 News Reid Research	2 Feb 2014	44.5	33.5	12.4	5.7	1.0	0.3	0.0	0.0	2.1		
Roy Morgan Research	20 Jan – 2 Feb 2014	47	33	11	4.5	1.5	1			1.5	0.5	
Fairfax Media Ipsos	8–10 Feb 2014	49.4	31.8	10.0	3.6	1.1	0.3	0.5	0.1	2.1		
Roy Morgan Research	3–16 Feb 2014	48	30	12	5.5	0.5	1	1	0.5	1	0.5	
One News Colmar Brunton	15–19 Feb 2014	51	34	8	3.1	0.9	0.0	0.4	0.3	1.3		
Roy Morgan Research	17 Feb – 2 Mar 2014	48.5	30.5	10.5	4.5	1.5	0.5	1	0.5	2.5		
10 Mar 2014 – Prime Minister John Key announces that the election would take place on 20 September 2014
Herald-DigiPoll	6–16 Mar 2014	50.8	29.5	13.1	3.6	0.2	0.1	0.8	0	1.3		
Roy Morgan Research	3–16 Mar 2014	45.5	31.5	14	3.5	2		0.5	0.5	1.5		
One News Colmar Brunton	22–26 Mar 2014	47	31	11	7	0.7	0	0.3	0.1	2.3		
3 News Reid Research	30 Mar 2014	45.9	31.2	11.2	4.9	1.5	1.1	1.1	0.1	1.9	0.4	
Roy Morgan Research	17–30 Mar 2014	43	32	13	5.5	1.5	0.5	0.5	0.5	2.5	0.5	
Roy Morgan Research	31 Mar – 14 Apr 2014	48.5	28.5	11.5	5.5	1	1	0.5	0	2	1	
23 Apr 2014 – Labour MP Shane Jones announces he will step down from the Labour Party to take up a government economic development role in the Pacific, focusing on fisheries.
Roy Morgan Research	21 Apr – 4 May 2014	42.5	31	14.5	6	1	1	0.5	0.5	0.5	1.5	
Fairfax Media Ipsos	10–12 May 2014	47.6	29.5	12.7	3.7	1.9	0.5	0.9	0.1	1.6		
13 May 2014 – The Internet Party is registered as a political party by the Electoral Commission. 15 May 2014 – Finance Minister Bill English delivers the 2014 budget. Surplus for 2014/15-year is $372m. Key initiatives include extending free GP visits to children 12 and under (currently 5 and under), increasing paid maternity leave from 14 to 18 weeks, and increasing Working for Families parental tax credit from $150 to $220 per week. Opposition parties suggest the surplus was produced by "fudging" the numbers and reducing funding for the Christchurch rebuild.
Roy Morgan Research	5–18 May 2014	45.5	30.5	13.5	6	1	1	0.5		1	0.5	
One News Colmar Brunton	17–21 May 2014	51	30	11	4.8	1	0	1	0	1	1	
3 News Reid Research	25 May 2014	50.3	29.5	10.2	5.6	0.6	0.2	0.5	0.0	2.3	0.6	
Roy Morgan Research	19 May – 1 Jun 2014	52.3	29	9	4.5	1.5	0.5	1		1	0.5	
27 May 2014 – The Internet Party and Mana Party announce they will contend the election together with a joint party list, under the name Internet–Mana Party. 5 June 2014 – ACT's sole MP, John Banks is found guilty of filing a false electoral return for his 2010 Auckland mayoral election campaign.
Roy Morgan Research	2–15 Jun 2014	49.5	28	12	4	1		0.5	0.0	1.5		2.5
Herald-DigiPoll	6–16 Jun 2014	50.4	30.5	10.7	3.6	0.8		0.7	0.1	1.5		1.4
Fairfax Media Ipsos	14–17 Jun 2014	55.6	23.2	11.9	3.2	0.7		0.7	0.0	0.9		2.1
18 Jun 2014 – Labour leader David Cunliffe is revealed to have written a letter to the New Zealand immigration service for Chinese businessman Donghua Liu when he was his electorate MP in 2003. NZ Herald reporters had asked Cunliffe about Liu the day before revealing the letter, and he denied any involvement with him.
3 News Reid Research	19–25 Jun 2014	49.7	27.3	12.7	3.6	1.5		0.4	0.0	2.8		1.8
One News Colmar Brunton	21–25 Jun 2014	50	29	12	3.8	1.2		0.7	0	1		2
Roy Morgan Research	16–29 Jun 2014	48	28	12	5.5	1.5		1	0	1		2.5
Roy Morgan Research	30 Jun – 13 Jul 2014	51	23.5	15	6	1		0.5	0.5	1		1.5
3 News Reid Research	8–16 Jul 2014	49.4	26.7	12.4	4.3	1.1		0.1	0.2	2.7		2.3
Fairfax Media Ipsos	17 Jul 2014	54.8	24.9	12.4	2.6	0.9		0.1	0.2	1.3		1.2
Herald-DigiPoll	10–17 Jul 2014	54.9	26.5	9.9	4.6	0.5		0	0	1.5		2.2
One News Colmar Brunton	19–23 Jul 2014	52	28	10	4.4	0.6		0.8	0.2	1.7		2
Roy Morgan Research	14–27 Jul 2014	46	30	12	5	1.5		0.5	0.5	1		2.5
31 Jul 2014 – Last sitting day of the 50th New Zealand Parliament.
Fairfax Media Ipsos	9–13 Aug 2014	55.1	22.5	11.3	3.4	1.0		0.2	0.0	3.4		2.1
One News Colmar Brunton	9–13 Aug 2014	50	26	11	5	0.9		0.6	0	2.4		3.9
3 News Reid Research	5–13 Aug 2014	47.5	29.0	13.0	4.6	0.8		0.3	0.2	2.5		2.0
13 Aug 2014 – Nicky Hager releases the book Dirty Politics, based on leaked e-mails from blogger Cameron Slater, alleging various ways National Party figures participated in Slater's "attack politics." Among other claims, Hager suggests one of John Key's staff members accessed the Labour Party online database, which journalist John Armstrong compared to the Watergate break-in.
Roy Morgan Research	4–17 Aug 2014	48	27.5	11.5	6.5	1		0.5	0.5	1		2.5
Herald-DigiPoll	14–20 Aug 2014	50	25.2	13.7	4.3	0.7		0.6	0.4	2.6		2.1
20 Aug 2014 – Writ Day: The Governor-General issues the writ of election, instructing the Electoral Commission to conduct the 2014 general election. Electoral roll closes for printing with 3.06 million eligible voters (late enrolments must cast special declaration votes). Main campaigning season and radio and television advertising begins.
3 News Reid Research	19–25 Aug 2014	45.0	26.4	13.5	6.3	0.7		0.3	0.4	4.6		2.1
Herald-DigiPoll	21–27 Aug 2014	50.7	24.1	11.4	5	1		0.3	0.2	3.3		3.4
Fairfax Media Ipsos	23–27 Aug 2014	50.8	26.1	11.8	4.0	0.7		0.7	0.1	2.7		2.2
One News Colmar Brunton	23–27 Aug 2014	48	28	12	6	0.6		0.4	0	3.2		1.6
30 Aug 2014 – Judith Collins resigns as a minister due to recurring controversies throughout her tenure as Minister of Justice. Her resignation comes following an accusation by Winston Peters that her office came to him with a possible leadership challenge against John Key, and the revelation of an e-mail from blogger Cameron Slater in 2011 that suggests Collins may have undermined a Director of the Serious Fraud Office.
Roy Morgan Research	18–31 Aug 2014	45	26	16	6	0.5		1	0	3.5		1
3 News Reid Research	26 Aug – 1 Sep 2014	46.4	25.9	12.6	5.8	2.0		0.6	0.1	4.2		1.7
Herald-DigiPoll	28 Aug – 3 Sep 2014	50.1	23.8	11.4	6	0.4		0.4	0.3	3.8		3.5
Fairfax Media Ipsos	30 Aug – 3 Sep 2014	54.2	24.3	12.9	3.6	0.3		0.2	0.1	2.4		1.3
One News Colmar Brunton	30 Aug – 3 Sep 2014	50	26	11	7	0.2		0.1	0.1	2.9		2.4
3 News Reid Research	2–8 Sep 2014	46.7	26.1	13.0	5.9	1.3		0.3	0.1	4.7		1.7
Herald-DigiPoll	4–10 Sep 2014	48.6	24.6	11.5	8.1	0.7		0.3	0	3.8		2.3
One News Colmar Brunton	6–10 Sep 2014	46	25	14	7	0.8		1.2	0.2	4		1.4
Fairfax Media Ipsos	6–10 Sep 2014	52.8	22.4	13.0	4.4	1.0		0.7	0.0	3.6		1.4
Roy Morgan Research	1–14 Sep 2014	46.5	24	13.5	8	1.5		0.5	0.5	3.5		1
3 News Reid Research (Note: Graphs above include polls up to and including this one.)	9–15 Sep 2014	44.5	25.6	14.4	7.1	1.1		0.1	0.1	4.9		2.0
Herald-DigiPoll	11–17 Sep 2014	48.2	25.9	11.1	8.4	1.1		0.5	0.2	3.3		1.0
One News Colmar Brunton	13–17 Sep 2014	45	25	12	8	1.6		0.6	0	4.4		1.8
Fairfax Media Ipsos	13–17 Sep 2014	47.7	26.1	12.0	6.6	0.9		0.3	0.0	4.5		0.9
20 Sep 2014 – Election Day:
2014 election result	20 Sep 2014	47.04	25.13	10.70	8.66	1.32	—N/a	0.69	0.22	3.97	—N/a	1.42
Poll	Date	National	Labour	Green	NZ First	Māori	Mana	ACT	United Future	Con	Internet	Internet Mana

== Preferred prime minister ==
Poll	Date	John Key	David Shearer	Winston Peters	Russel Norman
3 News Reid Research	19 Feb 2012	45.8	10.1	5.7	
One News Colmar Brunton	24–28 Mar 2012	48	11	3	
3 News Reid Research	22 Apr 2012	44.2	10.4	4.2	2.2
Herald-Digipoll	19–29 Apr 2012	63.9	13.1	6.4	
One News Colmar Brunton	4 Jun 2012	48	14		
3 News Reid Research	10 Jun 2012	40.5	12.3	4.8	4.0
Herald-Digipoll	18–25 Jun 2012	63.5	14.2	7.3	2.7
One News Colmar Brunton	5 Aug 2012	45	13		
3 News Reid Research	5 Aug 2012	43.2	8.9	6.2	2.0
Herald-Digipoll	20–31 Aug 2012	65.6	12.9	5.8	1.8
One News Colmar Brunton	23 Sep 2012	44	12	4	
3 News Reid Research	14 Oct 2012	41.0	8.5	5.0	2.4
One News Colmar Brunton	4 Nov 2012	42	11	6	
One News Colmar Brunton	2 Dec 2012	39	15		
3 News Reid Research	2 Dec 2012	37.4	12.6	5.0	2.2
One News Colmar Brunton	13 Feb 2013	44	15	5	2
Herald-Digipoll	21 Mar 2013	63	18.5	4	2.4
Herald-DigiPoll	12–23 Jun 2013	65.2	12.4	6.4	
3 News Reid Research	9–14 Jul 2013	42	12.1		
One News Colmar Brunton	27–31 Jul 2013	41	13	4	3
22 August 2013 – David Shearer announced his intention to step down as leader of the Labour Party. 15 September 2013 – David Cunliffe is elected as leader of the Labour Party.
Poll	Date	John Key	David Cunliffe	Winston Peters	Russel Norman
One News Colmar Brunton	22 Sep 2013	42	12	4	
Herald-DigiPoll	17–23 Sep 2013	55.8	16.8	6.2	3.7
One News Colmar Brunton	19–23 Oct 2013	43	12	4	
Herald on Sunday/Key Research	5–9 Dec 2013	45	18		
Herald-DigiPoll	9–17 Dec 2013	61.9	16.5	7.3	3.4
3 News Reid Research	23–29 Jan 2014	39.0	10.8	5.9	
Fairfax Media-Ipsos	8–10 Feb 2014	51.2	18.2		
One News Colmar Brunton	15–19 Feb 2014	42	8	4	
Herald-DigiPoll	6–16 Mar 2014	66.5	11.1	6.5	4.5
3 News Reid Research	18–26 Mar 2014	42.6	9	6.9	
One News Colmar Brunton	22–26 Mar 2014	42	8	4	
Fairfax Media-Ipsos	10–12 May 2014	48.6	13.4	3.4	1.8
3 News Reid Research	15–21 May 2014	43.1	9.8	7.8	
One News Colmar Brunton	17–21 May 2014	43	10		
Herald-DigiPoll	6–16 Jun 2014	65.9	12.7	6.2	2.5
Fairfax Media-Ipsos	14–17 Jun 2014	51.4	11.1	2.6	2.7
Fairfax Media-Ipsos	17 Jul 2014	58.2	14.2	2.2	2.1
Herald-DigiPoll	21–27 Aug 2014	67.8	11.6	8.2	3.8
Herald-DigiPoll	4–10 Sep 2014	61.6	17.9	7.8	3.3

== Electorate polling ==
The leftmost party columns are the parties, and their sitting Members of Parliament, that held the seats as a result of the 2011 election.

=== Epsom ===
Poll	Date	ACT David Seymour	National Paul Goldsmith	Labour Michael Wood	Green Julie Anne Genter	Conservative Christine Rankin	Mana Patrick O'Dea	Independent Grace Haden
Colmar Brunton (Note: This poll was taken twice, before and after respondents were informed that John Key was encouraging National Party supporters to give their electorate vote to the ACT Party candidate.)	10 August 2014	32	44	10	9	4	0.8	0.3
Colmar Brunton	10 August 2014	45	31	9	10	4	0.8	0.1

=== Tāmaki Makaurau ===
Poll	Date	Māori Rangi McLean	Labour Peeni Henare	Mana Kereama Pene	Green Marama Davidson
Māori TV Reid Research	24 July – 16 August 2014	28	27	14	7

=== Te Tai Tokerau ===
Poll	Date	Mana Hone Harawira	Labour Kelvin Davis	Māori Te Hira Paenga	Independent Clifton Dearlove
Māori TV Reid Research	July – August 2014	38	37	9.4	1.4

=== Te Tai Tonga ===
Poll	Date	Labour Rino Tirikatene	Māori Ngaire Button	Green Dora Roimata Langsbury	Mana Georgina Beyer
Māori TV Reid Research	July 2014	48	17	9	9

=== Waiariki ===
Poll	Date	Māori Te Ururoa Flavell	Mana Annette Sykes	Labour Rawiri Waititi	Independent Coalition Pat Spellman
Māori TV Reid Research	1 September 2014	50	21	17	2

== See also ==
- Opinion polling for the 2011 New Zealand general election
- Opinion polling for the 2017 New Zealand general election
- Politics of New Zealand
