= Opinion polling for the 2017 New Zealand general election =

Various organisations commissioned opinion polls for the 2017 New Zealand general election during the term of the 51st New Zealand Parliament (2014–2017). Roy Morgan Research polled monthly, with MediaWorks New Zealand (3 News/Newshub Reid Research) and Television New Zealand (One News Colmar Brunton) polling less frequently. The last The New Zealand Herald (Herald Digipoll) was in December 2015, and Fairfax Media (Fairfax Media Ipsos) discontinued their poll after the 2014 election. The sample size, margin of error and confidence interval of each poll varied by organisation and date, but were typically 800–1000 participants with a margin of error of just over 3%.

The previous Parliament was elected on Saturday 20 September 2014. The 2017 general election was held on Saturday 23 September 2017.

== Party vote and key events ==
Refusals are generally excluded from the party vote percentages, while question wording and the treatment of "don't know" responses and those not intending to vote may vary between survey organisations.

=== Graphical summary ===
The first graph below shows trend lines averaged across all polls for parties that received 5.0% or more of the party vote at the 2014 election. The second graph shows parties that received between 1.0% and 4.9% of the party vote or won an electorate seat at the 2014 election.

Line graph showing party vote opinion polling leading up to the 2017 New Zealand Election. (Weighted by sample size)

Line graph showing party vote opinion polling for the 2017 New Zealand General Election. (Under 4%)

=== Individual polls ===
| Date (Note: These are the survey dates of the poll, or if the survey dates are not stated, the date the poll was released.) | Poll | NAT | LAB | GRN | NZF | MRI | ACT | UNF | CON | MNA | TOP |
|---|---|---|---|---|---|---|---|---|---|---|---|
| 20 Sep 2014 | 2014 election result | 47.04 | 25.13 | 10.70 | 8.66 | 1.32 | 0.69 | 0.22 | 3.97 | 1.42 (Note: For the Internet MANA party vote alliance.) | N/A |
| 29 Sep – 12 Oct 2014 | Roy Morgan Research | 43.5 | 22.5 | 17.5 | 7 | 2 | 0.5 | 0.5 | 5 | 1 | N/A |
| 27 Oct – 9 Nov 2014 | Roy Morgan Research | 49.5 | 24 | 14.5 | 6.5 | 1 | 0.5 | 0 | 2 | 0.5 | N/A |
| 24 Nov – 7 Dec 2014 | Roy Morgan Research | 46 | 27 | 12 | 7 | 2 | 1.5 | 0 | 2.5 | 1 | N/A |
| 8–21 Dec 2014 | Herald–DigiPoll | 50.4 | 28.9 | 9.5 | 5.6 | 1.5 | 0.4 | 0 | 2.9 | 0.2 | N/A |
| 5–18 Jan 2015 | Roy Morgan Research | 52 | 26 | 11 | 6 | 1.5 | 1 | 0 | 2 | 0 | N/A |
| 20–28 Jan 2015 | 3 News–Reid Research | 49.8 | 29.1 | 9.3 | 6.9 | 1.3 | 0.4 | 0 | 2.7 | 0.6 | N/A |
| 2–15 Feb 2015 | Roy Morgan Research | 49 | 30 | 12 | 6 | 1 | 0 | 0 | 1.5 | 0 | N/A |
| 14–18 Feb 2015 | One News–Colmar Brunton | 49 | 31 | 10 | 6 | 1.5 | 0.3 | 0 | 1.4 | 0.4 | N/A |
| 2–15 Mar 2015 | Roy Morgan Research | 46.5 | 31 | 11 | 6 | 2 | 1 | – | 1.5 | – | N/A |
| 28 Mar 2015 | The Northland by-election is won by New Zealand First leader Winston Peters. | | | | | | | | | | |
| 11–15 Apr 2015 | One News–Colmar Brunton | 49 | 31 | 9 | 7 | 0.8 | 0.5 | – | 1.5 | 1.1 | N/A |
| 6–19 Apr 2015 | Roy Morgan Research | 45.5 | 27.5 | 13.5 | 8 | 1.5 | 1 | – | 1 | – | N/A |
| 17–26 Apr 2015 | Herald-DigiPoll | 51 | 28.7 | 10.8 | 6.1 | 0.8 | 0.8 | – | 1.1 | – | N/A |
| 4–17 May 2015 | Roy Morgan Research | 54 | 25.5 | 10.5 | 6 | 1 | 1 | 0 | 1 | – | N/A |
| 21 May 2015 | The 2015 Budget is delivered. | | | | | | | | | | |
| 23–27 May 2015 | One News–Colmar Brunton | 48 | 31 | 10 | 7 | 1.4 | 0.1 | – | 2.3 | – | N/A |
| 21–27 May 2015 | 3 News–Reid Research | 46.4 | 30.4 | 11.1 | 8.1 | 1.1 | 0.5 | – | 1.9 | 0.1 | N/A |
| 30 May 2015 | James Shaw replaces Russel Norman as the Green Party co-leader. | | | | | | | | | | |
| 8–21 Jun 2015 | Roy Morgan Research | 49.5 | 26 | 13 | 6.5 | 1 | 1 | – | 1 | – | N/A |
| 22–27 Jun 2015 | The Conservative Party disintegrates as leader Colin Craig and all board members resign. Acting leadership of the party is left unclear. | | | | | | | | | | |
| 29 Jun – 12 Jul 2015 | Roy Morgan Research | 43 | 32 | 13 | 7 | 1.5 | 0.5 | – | 1.5 | – | N/A |
| 11–15 Jul 2015 | One News–Colmar Brunton | 47 | 32 | 13 | 7 | 0.4 | 0.4 | – | – | 0.5 | N/A |
| 15–22 Jul 2015 | 3 News–Reid Research | 47 | 31.1 | 11.4 | 8.4 | 0.5 | 0.5 | 0.1 | 0.7 | 0.2 | N/A |
| 3–16 Aug 2015 | Roy Morgan Research | 50.5 | 27 | 11 | 8 | 1.5 | 0.5 | – | – | 0.5 | N/A |
| 14–24 Aug 2015 | Herald-DigiPoll | 50.8 | 31 | 9.2 | 6.9 | 1 | 0.2 | – | 0.6 | 0.2 | N/A |
| 29 Aug – 2 Sep 2015 | One News–Colmar Brunton | 47 | 32 | 12 | 7 | 1.2 | 0.1 | – | 0.1 | 0.2 | N/A |
| 31 Aug – 13 Sep 2015 | Roy Morgan Research | 44.5 | 31 | 15 | 5.5 | 1.5 | 0.5 | 0.5 | 1 | 0.5 | N/A |
| 8–16 Sep 2015 | 3 News–Reid Research | 47.3 | 33 | 10 | 7.9 | 0.5 | 0.6 | – | 0.5 | – | N/A |
| 31 Sep – 11 Oct 2015 | Roy Morgan Research | 50 | 29 | 11.5 | 6.5 | 0.5 | 0.5 | – | 0.5 | 0.5 | N/A |
| 10–14 Oct 2015 | One News–Colmar Brunton | 47 | 31 | 12 | 9 | 0.8 | 0.2 | – | 0.4 | – | N/A |
| 26 Oct – 8 Nov 2015 | Roy Morgan Research | 49 | 29.5 | 12 | 6 | 2 | 0.5 | – | 0.5 | 0.5 | N/A |
| 9–17 Nov 2015 | 3 News–Reid Research | 46.7 | 32.3 | 10.2 | 7.5 | 1.3 | 0.8 | – | 0.7 | 0.2 | N/A |
| 23 Nov – 6 Dec 2015 | Roy Morgan Research | 49 | 28.5 | 13 | 6 | 1.5 | 0.5 | 0.5 | 0.5 | – | N/A |
| 4–14 Dec 2015 | Herald-DigiPoll | 51.3 | 31.1 | 8.2 | 5.7 | 2.1 | 0.8 | 0.3 | – | – | N/A |
| 4–17 Jan 2016 | Roy Morgan Research | 47 | 27.5 | 14 | 6.5 | 3 | 0.5 | – | 1 | – | N/A |
| 4 Feb 2016 | The Trans-Pacific Partnership agreement is signed by the New Zealand government and 12 other partner countries. | | | | | | | | | | |
| 1–14 Feb 2016 | Roy Morgan Research | 48 | 27 | 14.5 | 6 | 1 | 0.5 | – | 1 | 0.5 | N/A |
| 13–17 Feb 2016 | One News–Colmar Brunton | 47 | 32 | 8 | 10 | 1.1 | 0.3 | – | 0.6 | 0.3 | N/A |
| 29 Feb – 13 Mar 2016 | Roy Morgan Research | 46 | 28 | 14 | 9 | 1 | 1 | – | 0.5 | 0.5 | N/A |
| 2–6 Apr 2016 | One News–Colmar Brunton | 50 | 28 | 10 | 9 | 1.1 | 0.7 | – | 0.3 | – | N/A |
| 4–17 Apr 2016 | Roy Morgan Research | 42.5 | 26 | 14.5 | 12.5 | 1.5 | 1.5 | – | 1 | – | N/A |
| 2–15 May 2016 | Roy Morgan Research | 45.5 | 29.5 | 12 | 9.5 | 1 | 1 | 0 | 0.5 | – | N/A |
| 12–22 May 2016 | Newshub Reid Research | 47 | 31.3 | 11.1 | 7.8 | 1 | 0.4 | – | 0.6 | 0.1 | N/A |
| 26 May 2016 | The 2016 Budget is delivered. | | | | | | | | | | |
| 31 May 2016 | The Labour and Green parties undertake a memorandum of understanding. | | | | | | | | | | |
| 28 May – 2 Jun 2016 | One News–Colmar Brunton | 48 | 29 | 12 | 9 | 0.7 | 0.3 | – | 0.7 | 0.1 | N/A |
| 12 Jun 2016 | Roy Morgan Research | 43.5 | 28 | 14.5 | 9 | 2 | 0.5 | – | 1 | 1 | N/A |
| 17 Jul 2016 | Roy Morgan Research | 53 | 25.5 | 11.5 | 7 | 0.5 | 1 | – | 0.5 | 0.5 | N/A |
| 22 Jul – 3 Aug 2016 | Newshub Reid Research | 45.1 | 32.7 | 11.5 | 8.1 | 1.3 | 0.2 | 0.1 | 0.5 | 0.4 | N/A |
| 8–21 Aug 2016 | Roy Morgan Research | 46 | 25.5 | 14.5 | 9.5 | 1.5 | 1 | – | 1 | 0.5 | N/A |
| 3–7 Sep 2016 | One News–Colmar Brunton | 48 | 26 | 13 | 11 | 2 | – | – | 0.3 | – | N/A |
| 5–18 Sep 2016 | Roy Morgan Research | 41.5 | 33.5 | 12 | 8.5 | 2 | 1 | – | 0.5 | – | N/A |
| 10–23 Oct 2016 | Roy Morgan Research | 48 | 26.5 | 11.5 | 10 | 1.5 | 0.5 | – | – | – | N/A |
| 14 Nov 2016 | A 7.8 magnitude earthquake hits the coastal town of Kaikōura. | | | | | | | | | | |
| Nov 2016 | The Opportunities Party is inaugurated by Gareth Morgan. | | | | | | | | | | |
| 12–23 Nov 2016 | One News–Colmar Brunton | 50 | 28 | 11 | 10 | 1 | – | – | 0.2 | – | – |
| 24 Oct – 20 Nov 2016 | Roy Morgan Research | 49.5 | 23.0 | 14.5 | 8.0 | 1.5 | 1.0 | 0.5 | 0.5 | 0.0 | – |
| 3 Dec 2016 | Labour's Michael Wood wins the Mount Roskill by-election. | | | | | | | | | | |
| 5 Dec 2016 | John Key announces that he will resign as Prime Minister of New Zealand, effective 12 December. | | | | | | | | | | |
| 28 Nov – 11 Dec 2016 | Roy Morgan Research | 45.0 | 28.5 | 14.5 | 7.5 | 1.0 | 0.5 | 0.5 | 0.5 | 0.5 | – |
| 12 Dec 2016 | Bill English replaces John Key as Prime Minister of New Zealand and Leader of the National Party. Paula Bennett becomes both Deputy Prime Minister and Deputy Leader. | | | | | | | | | | |
| 3–16 Jan 2017 | Roy Morgan Research | 46.0 | 27.0 | 12.5 | 9.0 | 2.0 | 0.5 | 0.5 | 0.5 | 0.0 | – |
| 1 Feb 2017 | Prime Minister Bill English announces that the election will take place on 23 September 2017. | | | | | | | | | | |
| 30 Jan – 12 Feb 2017 | Roy Morgan Research | 48.0 | 26.0 | 13.0 | 8.0 | 2.0 | 1.0 | 0.0 | 0.0 | 0.0 | – |
| 11–15 Feb 2017 | One News–Colmar Brunton | 46 | 30 | 11 | 11 | 0.7 | 0.8 | 0.3 | 0.2 | 0.8 | 0.0 |
| 25 Feb 2017 | Labour's Jacinda Ardern wins the Mount Albert by-election. | | | | | | | | | | |
| 1 Mar 2017 | Annette King steps down as Labour Party Deputy Leader and announces her retirement from Parliament, effective September. Mount Albert MP Jacinda Ardern is nominated as her successor and is confirmed six days later with the unanimous support of Labour's caucus. | | | | | | | | | | |
| 6 Mar 2017 | The Opportunities Party is registered by the Electoral Commission. | | | | | | | | | | |
| 27 Feb – 12 Mar 2017 | Roy Morgan Research | 43.5 | 29.5 | 14.5 | 7.5 | 2.0 | 0.5 | 0.5 | 0.5 | 0.5 | – |
| 10–19 Mar 2017 | Newshub Reid Research | 47.1 | 30.8 | 11.2 | 7.6 | 0.7 | 0.4 | 0.4 | 0.4 | 0.0 | 0.8 |
| 18–22 Mar 2017 | One News–Colmar Brunton | 46 | 30 | 11 | 8 | 4 | 0.4 | – | 0.3 | 0.2 | 0.4 |
| 3–16 Apr 2017 | Roy Morgan Research | 43.0 | 29.5 | 13.0 | 10.5 | 1.0 | 1.5 | 0.0 | 0.5 | 0.0 | – |
| 1–14 May 2017 | Roy Morgan Research | 43.0 | 28.5 | 14.0 | 10.0 | 1.5 | 0.5 | 0.0 | 0.0 | 0.5 | – |
| 25 May 2017 | The 2017 budget is delivered. | | | | | | | | | | |
| 19–24 May 2017 | Listener: Bauer Media Insights | 43.75 | 23.75 | 16.25 | 10.00 | 1.25 | 1.25 | 0.00 | 1.25 | – | 2.50 |
| 21–31 May 2017 | One News–Colmar Brunton | 49 | 30 | 9 | 9 | 0.6 | 0.5 | – | 0.1 | – | 1.4 |
| 29 May – 11 Jun 2017 | Roy Morgan Research | 46.5 | 25.5 | 14.0 | 9.0 | 1.5 | 1.0 | 0.0 | 0.0 | 0.5 | – |
| 12 Jun 2017 | Newshub Reid Research | 47.4 | 26.4 | 12.5 | 9.4 | 0.7 | 0.9 | 0.3 | 0.8 | 0.3 | 0.8 |
| 21 Jun 2017 | National MP Todd Barclay announces he will not seek re-election after it was revealed that he secretly recorded a staff member's conversations without her consent. Police re-open their investigation five days later, after Bill English stated that Barclay had admitted to him that he made the recording. | | | | | | | | | | |
| 1–5 Jul 2017 | One News–Colmar Brunton | 47 | 27 | 11 | 11 | 1.8 | 0.3 | 0.2 | 0.1 | 0.3 | 1.1 |
| 26 Jun – 9 Jul 2017 | Roy Morgan Research | 43 | 30.5 | 13.5 | 8.0 | 1.5 | 1.0 | 0.0 | 0.0 | 0.0 | – |
| 16 Jul 2017 | Green Party co-leader Metiria Turei admits to not disclosing to Work and Income New Zealand that she was accepting rent from flatmates while on the Domestic Purposes Benefit in the early 1990s. | | | | | | | | | | |
| 22–27 Jul 2017 | One News–Colmar Brunton | 47 | 24 | 15 | 11 | 0.6 | 0.3 | 0.1 | – | – | 1.5 |
| 20–28 Jul 2017 | Newshub Reid Research | 45.2 | 24.1 | 13 | 13 | 1.2 | 0.5 | 0.2 | 0.2 | 0.2 | 2 |
| 1 Aug 2017 | Labour Party leader Andrew Little resigns as Leader of the Labour Party following consecutive poll results that show Labour with low support. Jacinda Ardern is confirmed as Leader shortly after while Kelvin Davis assumes the role of Deputy Leader. | | | | | | | | | | |
| 1–2 Aug 2017 | Listener: Bauer Media Insights | 45.42 | 26.79 | 13.98 | 9.32 | 0.00 | 1.17 | 0.00 | 0.00 | 0.00 | 2.33 |
| 3 Aug 2017 | Green Party co-leader Metiria Turei admits to registering a false residential address to vote for a friend who was running in the Mount Albert electorate in 1993. The controversy leads Green Party MPs David Clendon and Kennedy Graham to withdraw from the party list four days later. | | | | | | | | | | |
| 2–8 Aug 2017 | Newshub Reid Research | 44.4 | 33.1 | 8.3 | 9.2 | 1.5 | 0.6 | 0.1 | 0.3 | 0.3 | 2 |
| 9 Aug 2017 | Green Party co-leader Metiria Turei resigns as co-leader and from the party list following her admission of benefit fraud. | | | | | | | | | | |
| 31 Jul – 13 Aug 2017 | Roy Morgan Research | 42.5 | 32.5 | 9.0 | 11.5 | 1.5 | 0.5 | 0.0 | 0.0 | 0.0 | 2.0 |
| 12–16 Aug 2017 | One News–Colmar Brunton | 44 | 37 | 4.3 | 10 | 1.7 | 0.4 | 0.0 | – | – | 2.1 |
| 21 Aug 2017 | United Future leader and Minister of Internal Affairs Peter Dunne announces his retirement from politics. Damian Light (candidate for Botany) is appointed leader 2 days later. | | | | | | | | | | |
| 27 Aug 2017 | Controversy arises after a leak reveals that NZ First leader Winston Peters was overpaid in his superannuation payments for years. | | | | | | | | | | |
| 22–30 Aug 2017 | Newshub Reid Research | 43.3 | 39.4 | 6.1 | 6.6 | 1.0 | 0.6 | 0.1 | 0.3 | 0.0 | 1.9 |
| 26–30 Aug 2017 | One News–Colmar Brunton | 41 | 43 | 5 | 8 | 0.5 | 0.3 | – | – | – | 0.9 |
| 1–5 Sep 2017 | Listener: Bauer Media Insights | 38.9 | 41.1 | 6.7 | 8.9 | 1.1 | 1.1 | – | – | – | 2.2 |
| 2–6 Sep 2017 | One News–Colmar Brunton | 39 | 43 | 5 | 9 | 2.0 | 0.1 | – | – | – | 1.9 |
| 4–6 Sep 2017 | Newsroom-SSI | 30 | 45 | 6 | 11 | 2 | 1 | – | – | – | 2 |
| 28 Aug – 10 Sep 2017 | Roy Morgan Research | 40 | 39.5 | 9 | 6 | 2 | 0.5 | 0 | 0.5 | – | 2 |
| 6–11 Sep 2017 | Newshub Reid Research | 47.3 | 37.8 | 4.9 | 6.0 | 1.1 | 0.6 | 0.1 | 0.3 | 0.1 | 1.6 |
| 11 Sep 2017 | Advance voting for the election begins. The Electoral Commission predicts up to 50% of voters will cast their vote before election day (up from 30% in 2014). | | | | | | | | | | |
| 9–13 Sep 2017 | One News–Colmar Brunton | 40 | 44 | 7 | 6 | 0.9 | 0.6 | – | – | – | 1.6 |
| 13–20 Sep 2017 | Newshub Reid Research | 45.8 | 37.3 | 7.1 | 7.1 | 0.4 | 0.6 | – | 0.6 | 0.1 | 0.9 |
| 15–19 Sep 2017 | One News–Colmar Brunton | 46 | 37 | 8 | 4.9 | 0.5 | 0.3 | – | – | – | 2.3 |
| 23 Sep 2017 | Election day | | | | | | | | | | |
| 23 Sep 2017 | 2017 election result | 44.4 | 36.9 | 6.3 | 7.2 | 1.2 | 0.5 | 0.1 | 0.2 | 0.1 | 2.4 |
| Date | Poll | NAT | LAB | GRN | NZF | MRI | ACT | UNF | CON | MNA | TOP |

=== Internal polls ===
These polls are typically unpublished and are used internally for Labour (UMR) and National (Curia). Although these polls are sometimes leaked or partially leaked, their details are not publicly available for viewing and scrutinising. Because not all of their polls are made public, it is likely that those which are released are cherry-picked and therefore may not truly indicate ongoing trends.

| Date | Poll | NAT | LAB | GRN | NZF | MRI | ACT | CON | MNA | TOP |
|---|---|---|---|---|---|---|---|---|---|---|
| 20 Sep 2014 | 2014 election result | 47.04 | 25.13 | 10.70 | 8.66 | 1.32 | 0.69 | 3.97 | 1.40 | N/A |
| Oct 2014 | UMR Research | 50 | 24 | 13 | 7.8 | 1.5 | 0.6 | 3.0 | 0.8 | N/A |
| Nov 2014 | UMR Research | 47 | 25 | 13 | 7.6 | 2.7 | 0.4 | 3.0 | 0.8 | N/A |
| Dec 2014 | UMR Research | 45 | 30 | 14 | 6.1 | 0.6 | 0.2 | 3.3 | 0.5 | N/A |
| Jan 2015 | UMR Research | 48 | 31 | 12 | 5.8 | 1.0 | 0.0 | 1.6 | 0.0 | N/A |
| Feb 2015 | UMR Research | 46 | 32 | 12 | 5.0 | 1.5 | 0.7 | 2.7 | 0.3 | N/A |
| Mar 2015 | UMR Research | 46 | 31 | 11 | 6.9 | 1.6 | 0.4 | 3.1 | 0.4 | N/A |
| Apr 2015 | UMR Research | 43 | 32 | 13 | 7.6 | 1.8 | 1.1 | 1.2 | 0.3 | N/A |
| May 2015 | UMR Research | 46 | 31 | 10 | 6.8 | 1.3 | 1.1 | 3.0 | 0.4 | N/A |
| Jun 2015 | UMR Research | 45 | 32 | 13 | 7.5 | 1.2 | 0.5 | 0.9 | 0.2 | N/A |
| Jul 2015 | UMR Research | 41 | 35 | 14 | 6.7 | 1.2 | 0.3 | 3.0 | 0.5 | N/A |
| Aug 2015 | UMR Research | 42 | 31 | 14 | 8.5 | 1.5 | 0.5 | 0.4 | 0.4 | N/A |
| Sep 2015 | UMR Research | 45 | 31 | 13 | 8.7 | 0.1 | 0.8 | 1.0 | 0.4 | N/A |
| Oct 2015 | UMR Research | 48 | 31 | 10 | 7.9 | 1.1 | 1.0 | 0.5 | 0.2 | N/A |
| Nov 2015 | UMR Research | 44 | 31 | 13 | 8.0 | 1.5 | 0.5 | 1.2 | 0.1 | N/A |
| Dec 2015 | UMR Research | 45 | 35 | 10 | 8.3 | 1.0 | 1.0 | 0.2 | 0.2 | N/A |
| 31 Aug – 5 Sep 2016 | UMR Research | 40 | 31 | 14 | 11 | – | – | – | – | N/A |
| Early Jan 2017 | UMR Research | 46 | 30 | 11 | 9 | – | – | – | – | – |
| Early Feb 2017 | UMR Research | 44 | 30 | 12 | 11 | – | – | – | – | – |
| Late Feb 2017 | UMR Research | 48 | 28 | 12 | 8 | – | – | – | – | – |
| Early Mar 2017 | UMR Research | 42 | 30 | 14 | 10 | – | – | – | – | – |
| Late Mar 2017 | UMR Research | 44 | 30 | 12 | 10 | – | – | – | – | – |
| Early Apr 2017 | UMR Research | 43 | 28 | 13 | 12 | – | – | – | – | – |
| Late Apr 2017 | UMR Research | 43 | 28 | 12 | 12 | – | – | – | – | – |
| Early May 2017 | UMR Research | 42 | 34 | 13 | 9 | – | – | – | – | – |
| Late May 2017 | UMR Research | 44 | 30 | 13 | 9 | – | – | – | – | – |
| Early Jun 2017 | UMR Research | 42 | 32 | 13 | 9 | – | – | – | – | – |
| Late Jun 2017 | UMR Research | 43 | 29 | 12 | 11 | – | – | – | – | – |
| 5–10 Jul 2017 | UMR Research | 42 | 26 | 13 | 14 | – | – | – | – | – |
| Late Jul 2017 | UMR Research | 42 | 23 | 15 | 16 | – | – | – | – | – |
| 1–8 Aug 2017 | UMR Research | 43 | 36 | 8 | 8 | – | – | – | – | 3 |
| 11–16 Aug 2017 | UMR Research | 40 | 37 | 8 | 9 | – | – | – | – | 3.5 |
| 20 Sep 2017 | Curia | 43 | 39 | 6 | 6 | – | – | – | – | – |

== Preferred prime minister ==
=== Graphical summary ===
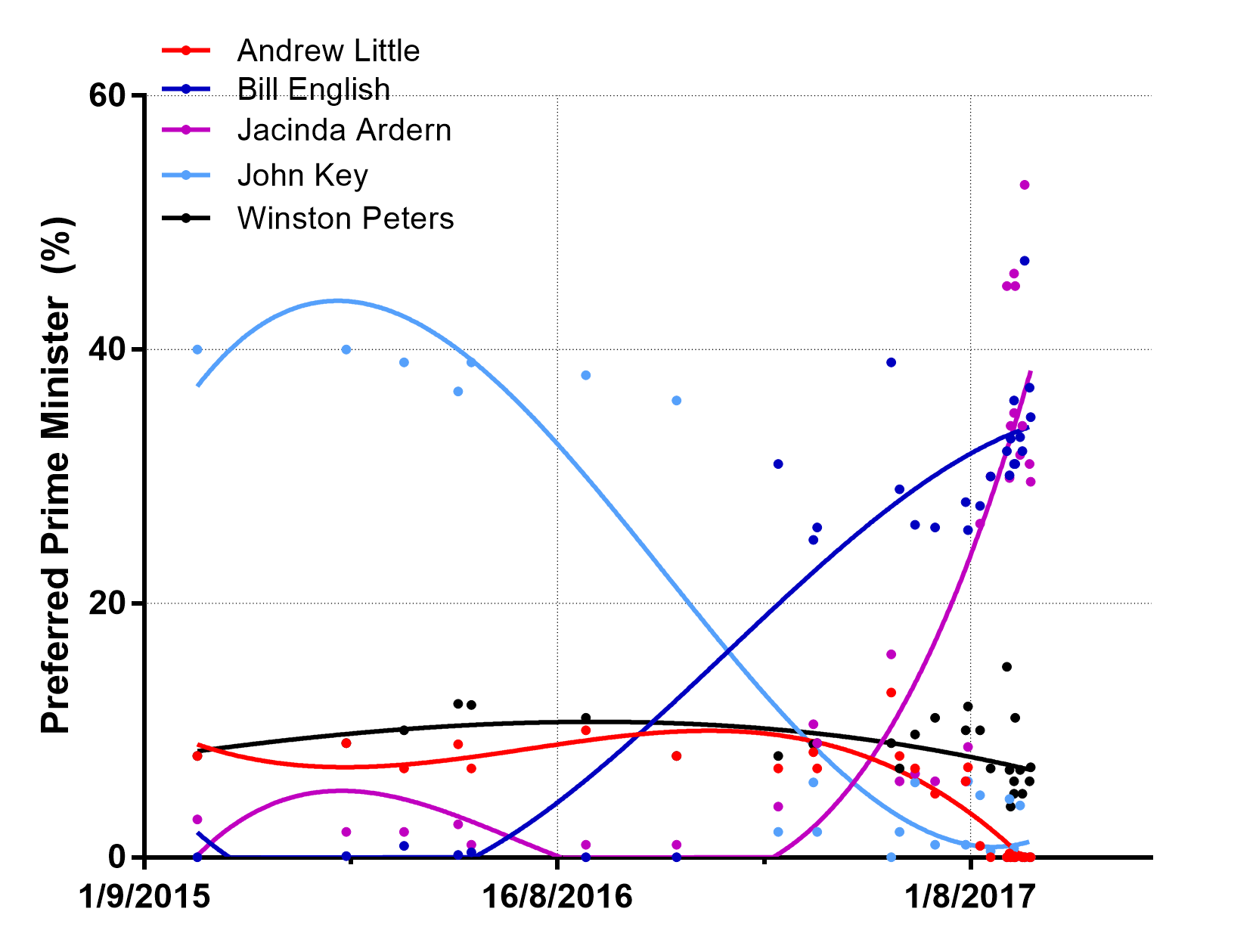
Summary of Preferred Prime Minister Polls from 2015 to September 2017. Lines show the mean, as estimated by a Loess smoother. Figures to the right show the estimate from the smoothing line at the date of the most recent poll, with 95% confidence interval.

=== Individual polls ===
| Poll | Date | Bill English | Jacinda Ardern | Winston Peters | James Shaw | Hone Harawira | Gareth Morgan | Peter Dunne | Metiria Turei | Andrew Little | John Key |
|---|---|---|---|---|---|---|---|---|---|---|---|
| Herald-DigiPoll | 8–21 Dec 2014 | – | 1.7 | – | – | – | – | – | – | 13.6 | 65 |
| 3 News-Reid Research | 20–28 Jan 2015 | 0.3 | – | 7.6 | – | – | – | – | – | 9.8 | 44.0 |
| One News-Colmar Brunton | 14–18 Feb 2015 | 0.6 | 0.7 | 7.0 | – | 0.4 | – | – | 1.1 | 12.0 | 41.0 |
| Herald-DigiPoll | 17–26 Apr 2015 | – | – | 12 | – | – | – | – | – | 13.9 | 64.6 |
| 3 News Reid Research | 21–27 May 2015 | 0.6 | – | 11.2 | – | – | – | – | – | 11.6 | 39.4 |
| 3 News Reid Research | 15–22 Jul 2015 | 0.2 | – | 11.3 | 0.2 | – | – | – | – | 10.2 | 38.3 |
| Herald-DigiPoll | 14–24 Aug 2015 | – | 3.9 | 11.6 | 0.6 | – | – | – | 0.9 | 13.3 | 63.7 |
| 3 News Reid Research | 8–16 Sep 2015 | 0.3 | 3.5 | 8.6 | 0.2 | – | – | 0.1 | – | 10.8 | 39.5 |
| 3 News Reid Research | 9–17 Nov 2015 | 0.7 | 4.2 | 9.3 | – | – | – | 0.1 | – | 10.4 | 38.3 |
| Herald-DigiPoll | 4–14 Dec 2015 | – | 2.8 | 7.9 | – | – | – | – | – | 16.2 | 65.2 |
| One News Colmar Brunton | 2–6 Apr 2016 | 0.9 | 2 | 10 | 0.4 | – | – | – | – | 7 | 39 |
| Newshub Reid Research | 12–22 May 2016 | 0.2 | 2.6 | 12.1 | 0.5 | – | – | – | – | 8.9 | 36.7 |
| One News Colmar Brunton | 28 May – 2 Jun 2016 | 0.4 | 1 | 12 | 0.4 | – | – | – | – | 7 | 39 |
| Newshub Reid Research | 22 Jul – 3 Aug 2016 | 0.3 | 2.9 | 10.9 | 0.9 | – | 0.3 | – | 1 | 10.5 | 36.7 |
| One News Colmar Brunton | 3–7 Sep 2016 | – | 1 | 11 | 0.1 | – | – | – | – | 10 | 38 |
| One News Colmar Brunton | 12–23 Nov 2016 | – | 1 | 8 | 0.3 | – | 0.1 | 0.3 | 1 | 8 | 36 |
12 Dec 2016 – Bill English replaces John Key as Prime Minister of New Zealand and Leader of the National Party.
| One News Colmar Brunton | 11–15 Feb 2017 | 31 | 4 | 8 | 0.3 | – | 0.1 | – | 2 | 7 | 2 |
| Newshub Reid Research | 10–19 Mar 2017 | 25 | 10.5 | 8.9 | – | – | 0.1 | – | 1 | 8.3 | 5.9 |
| One News Colmar Brunton | 18–22 Mar 2017 | 26 | 9 | 9 | 0.5 | 0.3 | – | 0.2 | 0.4 | 7 | 2 |
| Listener: Bauer Media Insights | 19–24 May 2017 | 39 | 16 | 9 | 2 | – | 2 | – | 3 | 13 | – |
| One News Colmar Brunton | 21–31 May 2017 | 29 | 6 | 7 | 0.4 | – | 0.2 | 0.1 | 0.7 | 8 | 2 |
| Newshub Reid Research | 2–12 Jun 2017 | 26.2 | 6.6 | 9.7 | 0.7 | 0.3 | 0.5 | 0.3 | 1.4 | 7 | 5.9 |
| One News Colmar Brunton | 1–5 Jul 2017 | 26 | 6 | 11 | 0.5 | 0.5 | 0.7 | – | 0.2 | 5 | 1 |
| One News Colmar Brunton | 22–27 Jul 2017 | 28 | 6 | 10 | 0.2 | – | 0.3 | 0.2 | 1 | 6 | 1 |
| Newshub Reid Research | 20–28 Jul 2017 | 25.8 | 8.7 | 11.9 | 0.7 | 0.2 | 0.8 | 0.4 | 1.6 | 7.1 | 6 |
1 Aug 2017 – Jacinda Ardern replaces Andrew Little as Leader of the Opposition and Leader of the Labour Party.
| Newshub Reid Research | 2–8 Aug 2017 | 27.7 | 26.3 | 10 | 0.2 | 0.5 | 0.6 | – | 0.8 | 0.9 | 4.9 |
9 Aug 2017 – Metiria Turei resigns as co-leader of the Green Party.
| One News Colmar Brunton | 12–16 Aug 2017 | 30 | 30 | 7 | 0.3 | 0.4 | 0.7 | – | – | – | 0.5 |
21–23 Aug 2017 – Peter Dunne retires as leader of United Future and is replaced by Damian Light.
| Newshub Reid Research | 22–30 Aug 2017 | 30.1 | 29.9 | 6.9 | 0.5 | 0.1 | 0.6 | 0 | 0.8 | 0.3 | 4.6 |
| One News Colmar Brunton | 26–30 Aug 2017 | 33 | 34 | 4 | 0.4 | – | 0.4 | – | 0.8 | – | – |
| Listener: Bauer Media Insights | 1–5 Sep 2017 | 36 | 46 | 6 | 1 | – | 1 | – | – | – | – |
| One News Colmar Brunton | 2–6 Sep 2017 | 31 | 35 | 5 | 1 | 0.1 | 0.5 | – | – | 0.1 | 0.7 |
| Newsroom: SSI | 4–6 Sep 2017 | 31 | 45 | 11 | – | – | – | – | – | – | – |
| Newshub Reid Research | 6–11 Sep 2017 | 33.1 | 31.7 | 6.9 | 0.6 | 0.3 | 0.8 | 0.2 | 0.8 | 0.1 | 4.1 |
| One News Colmar Brunton | 9–13 Sep 2017 | 32 | 34 | 5 | 0.3 | – | 0.3 | – | 0.2 | – | 0.6 |
| Newshub Reid Research | 13–20 Sep 2017 | 34.7 | 29.6 | 7.1 | 0.6 | – | 0.5 | 0.1 | 0.5 | 0.4 | 3.6 |
| One News Colmar Brunton | 15–19 Sep 2017 | 37 | 31 | 6 | 0.3 | 0.3 | 0.2 | – | 0.1 | – | 0.7 |
| Poll | Date | Bill English | Jacinda Ardern | Winston Peters | James Shaw | Hone Harawira | Gareth Morgan | Peter Dunne | Metiria Turei | Andrew Little | John Key |

== Electorate polling ==
=== Ōhāriu ===
==== Party vote ====
| Poll | Date | National | Labour | Green | NZ First | TOP | United Future | Māori | ACT |
|---|---|---|---|---|---|---|---|---|---|
| 2014 election result | 20 September 2014 | 50.23 | 23.42 | 15.01 | 4.76 | —N/a* | 0.73 | 0.57 | 0.67 |
| Q+A Colmar Brunton | 5 – 9 Aug 2017 | 46 | 35 | 12 | 4 | 1.8 | 0.5 | 0.4 | 0.3 |

* The Opportunities Party did not exist until 2016.

==== Candidate vote ====
| Poll | Date | Labour Greg O'Connor | United Future Peter Dunne | National Brett Hudson | Green Tane Woodley | TOP Jessica Hammond Doube | ACT Andie Moore | Labour Ginny Andersen | ACT Sean Fitzpatrick |
|---|---|---|---|---|---|---|---|---|---|
| 2014 election result | 20 September 2014 | —N/a | 36.23 | 16.34 | 7.38 | —N/a* | —N/a | 34.34 | 0.55 |
14 Feb 2017 – Green Party choose not to stand a candidate to help Labour candidate Greg O'Connor defeat Peter Dunne.
| Q+A Colmar Brunton | 5 – 9 August 2017 | 48 | 34 | 14 | — | 2 | 1 | —N/a | —N/a |
21 Aug 2017 – Ōhāriu Incumbent Peter Dunne (leader of United Future) announces that he will now be retiring from politics. 23 Aug 2017 – United Future stand Bale Nadakuitavuki as a candidate and Green Party reinstate Tane Woodley as a candidate.

* The Opportunities Party did not exist until 2016.

=== Waiariki ===
==== Party vote ====
| Poll | Date | Labour | Māori | NZ First | National | Green |
|---|---|---|---|---|---|---|
| 2014 election result | 20 September 2014 | 38.37 | 21.79 | 12.54 | 5.00 | 7.98 |
| Community Engagement Ltd | 19 – 22 July 2017 | 19.4 | 18.9 | 25.7 | 13.4 | 12.1 |
| Maori TV-Reid Research | July – 3 September 2017 | 49.6 | 26.5 | 10.2 | 5.6 | 4.8 |

==== Candidate vote ====
| Poll | Date | Māori Te Ururoa Flavell | Labour Tāmati Coffey | Labour Rawiri Waititi | Mana Annette Sykes |
|---|---|---|---|---|---|
| 2014 election result | 20 September 2014 | 43.42 | —N/a | 26.06 | 24.48 |
26 Aug 2016 – Rawiri Waititi cuts allegiances with Labour after being inspired by the Māori King to encourage Mana and Māori parties to win all Māori electorates by working together. 7 Oct 2016 – Tāmati Coffey is announced as Labour candidate for Waiariki electorate. Coffey ran for Rotorua electorate in 2014 gaining 33.18% of the vote against Todd McClay who won with 54.97% of the vote. 20 Feb 2017 – Mana begin a memorandum of understanding with the Māori Party to not contest in any electorates where Māori Party have candidates, in an attempt to win back the Māori electorates from Labour.
| Community Engagement Ltd | 19 – 22 July 2017 | 31.6 | 30.1 | —N/a | —N/a |
| Maori TV-Reid Research | July – 3 September 2017 | 60.1 | 39.9 | —N/a | —N/a |

=== The Māori roll (all 7 electorates) ===
| Poll | Date | Labour | Māori | NZ First | National | Green | Mana | TOP |
|---|---|---|---|---|---|---|---|---|
| 2014 election result | 20 September 2014 | 41.22 | 14.05 | 12.98 | 7.93 | 11.17 | 10.22 | N/A* |
| Māori TV, Reid Research Poll | 11 Jul – 17 Aug 2017 | 46.5 | 17.5 | 13.8 | 9.5 | 9.0 | 1.8 | 1.5 |

* The Opportunities Party did not exist until 2016.

=== Whangarei ===
==== Party vote ====
| Poll | Date | National | Labour | NZ First | Green | Māori | ACT | TOP |
|---|---|---|---|---|---|---|---|---|
| 2014 election result | 20 September 2014 | 50.08 | 17.80 | 13.36 | 9.77 | 0.53 | 0.55 | N/A* |
30 Jun 2017 – Shane Jones is confirmed as the New Zealand First candidate in Whangarei (National have held the Whangarei seat since 1975).
| Q+A Colmar Brunton | 19 – 22 Aug 2017 | 41 | 37 | 16 | 3.6 | 1.3 | 1.0 | 0.4 |

* The Opportunities Party did not exist until 2016.

==== Candidate vote ====
| Poll | Date | National Shane Reti | NZ First Shane Jones | Labour Tony Savage | Green Ash Holwell | DFSC Chris Leitch | ACT Robin Grieve | Labour Kelly Ellis | NZ First Pita Paraone | Green Paul Doherty |
|---|---|---|---|---|---|---|---|---|---|---|
| 2014 election result | 20 September 2014 | 55.07 | N/A | N/A | N/A | 2.68 | 0.78 | 19.01 | 8.06 | 8.66 |
30 Jun 2017 – Shane Jones is confirmed as the New Zealand First candidate in Whangarei (National have held the Whangarei seat since 1975).
| Q+A Colmar Brunton | 19 – 22 Aug 2017 | 42 | 24 | 22 | 10 | 1.7 | 0.1 | N/A | N/A | N/A |

=== Ikaroa-Rāwhiti ===
==== Party vote ====
| Poll | Date | Labour | Māori | Mana | National | NZ First | Green | ACT | TOP |
|---|---|---|---|---|---|---|---|---|---|
| 2014 election result | 20 September 2014 | 47.38 | 12.19 | —N/a | 5.37 | 11.25 | 10.28 | 0.11 | —N/a |
| Māori TV Reid Research | 11 Jul – 17 Aug 2017 | 50.4 | 21.1 | 1.3 | 5.9 | 12 | 7.5 | 0.3 | 1.6 |

==== Candidate vote ====
| Poll | Date | Labour Meka Whaitiri | Māori Marama Fox | Green Elizabeth Kerekere |
|---|---|---|---|---|
| Māori TV Reid Research | 11 Jul – 17 Aug 2017 | 55 | 39 | 6 |

=== Te Tai Hauāuru ===
==== Party vote ====
| Poll | Date | Labour | Māori | National | Green | NZ First | Mana | TOP |
|---|---|---|---|---|---|---|---|---|
| 2014 election result | 20 September 2014 | 42.23 | 17.64 | 7.11 | 11.93 | 11.79 | 6.82 | —N/a |
| Māori TV Reid Research | 11 Jul – 17 Aug 2017 | 41.8 | 24 | 11.2 | 9.1 | 11 | 1.3 | 1.3 |

==== Candidate vote ====
| Poll | Date | Labour Adrian Rurawhe | Māori Howie Tamati | Green Jack McDonald |
|---|---|---|---|---|
| Māori TV Reid Research | 11 Jul – 17 Aug 2017 | 39 | 52 | 9.1 |

=== Te Tai Tonga ===
==== Party vote ====
| Poll | Date | Labour | National | Māori | Green | NZ First | ACT | TOP |
|---|---|---|---|---|---|---|---|---|
| 2014 election result | 20 September 2014 | 36.7 | 14.92 | 11.19 | 16.41 | 12.82 | 0.17 | —N/a |
| Māori TV Reid Research | 11 Jul – 17 Aug 2017 | 47.6 | 14.1 | 11.7 | 9.3 | 14.4 | 0.3 | 2.4 |

==== Candidate vote ====
| Poll | Date | Labour Rino Tirikatene | Māori Mei Reedy-Taare | Green Metiria Turei |
|---|---|---|---|---|
| Māori TV Reid Research | 11 Jul – 17 Aug 2017 | 57.1 | 22.1 | 20.7 |

=== Hauraki-Waikato ===
==== Party vote ====
| Poll | Date | Labour | NZ First | Māori |
|---|---|---|---|---|
| 2014 election result | 20 September 2014 | 46.50 | 13.37 | 11.97 |
| Māori TV-Reid Research | 11 Jul – 3 Sept 2017 | 52.6 | 15.1 | 14.5 |

==== Candidate vote ====
| Poll | Date | Labour Nanaia Mahuta | Māori Rahui Papa | Mana Susan Cullen |
|---|---|---|---|---|
| 2014 election result | 20 September 2014 | 59.54 | 21.96 | 15.22 |
| Māori TV-Reid Research | 11 Jul – 3 Sept 2017 | 78 | 22 | —N/a |

=== Tāmaki Makaurau ===
==== Party vote ====
| Poll | Date | Labour | NZ First | Māori | Green | National |
|---|---|---|---|---|---|---|
| 2014 election result | 20 September 2014 | 40.45 | 13.98 | 12.72 | 11.69 | 7.55 |
| Māori TV-Reid Research | 12 Jul – 5 Sept 2017 | 47.0 | 12.6 | 14.5 | 11.3 | 12.6 |

==== Candidate vote ====
| Poll | Date | Labour Peeni Henare | Māori Shane Taurima | Green Marama Davidson | Māori Rangi McLean |
|---|---|---|---|---|---|
| 2014 election result | 20 September 2014 | 37.48 | —N/a | 15.60 | 30.21 |
| Māori TV-Reid Research | 12 Jul – 5 Sept 2017 | 46.0 | 32.6 | 21.4 | —N/a |

=== Te Tai Tokerau ===
==== Party vote ====
| Poll | Date | Labour | NZ First | Māori | Green | National | Mana |
|---|---|---|---|---|---|---|---|
| 2014 election result | 20 September 2014 | 38.8 | 8.1 | 9.1 | 8.7 | 10.2 | 16.3 |
| Māori TV-Reid Research | 12 Jul – 5 Sept 2017 | 49.7 | 14.7 | 9.7 | 10.3 | 7.9 | 6.1 |

==== Candidate vote ====
| Poll | Date | Labour Kelvin Davis | Mana Hone Harawira | Green Godfrey Rudoplh |
|---|---|---|---|---|
| 2014 election result | 20 September 2014 | 43.90 | 40.53 | —N/a |
| Māori TV-Reid Research | 12 Jul – 5 Sept 2017 | 67.4 | 30.3 | 2.3 |

== Forecasts ==
The use of mixed-member proportional representation allows ready conversion of a party's support into a party vote percentage and therefore a number of seats in Parliament. Projections generally assume no changes to electorate seats each party holds (ACT retains Epsom, Māori retains Waiariki, Labour retains Te Tai Tokerau, etc.) unless there is a specific reason to assume change. For example, after Peter Dunne announced his retirement, projections stopped assuming United Future would retain Ōhāriu. Other parties that do not pass the 5% threshold are assumed not to win an electorate and therefore gain no seats.

Radio New Zealand takes a "poll of polls" average to produce their forecast. The New Zealand Herald bases theirs on a predictive model incorporating poll data as well as past election results and past poll accuracy. Newshub and 1 News and produce projections based on their own polls only.

When determining the scenarios for the overall result, the minimum parties necessary to form majority governments are listed (provided parties have indicated openness to working together). Actual governments formed may include other parties beyond the minimum required for a majority. This happened after the 2014 election, when National only needed one seat from another party to reach a 61-seat majority, but they formed a 64-seat government with Māori, ACT and United Future.

| Party | Newshub 13–20 Sep 2017 poll [final] | 1 News 15–19 Sep 2017 poll [final] | Roy Morgan 28 Aug–10 Sep 2017 poll [final] | Radio NZ as of 21 Sep 2017 [final] | NZ Herald as of 22 Sep 2017 [final] | Stuff as of 22 Sep 2017 [final] | Official result |
|---|---|---|---|---|---|---|---|
| National | 56 | 58 | 50 | 55 | 56 (±2) | 54 | 56 |
| Labour | 45 | 46 | 49 | 46 | 47 (±3) | 46 | 46 |
| NZ First | 9 | 6 | 7 | 8 | 9 (±2) | 7 | 9 |
| Green | 9 | 9 | 11 | 9 | 7 (±2) | 10 | 8 |
| ACT | 1 | 1* | 1 | 1 | 1 | 1 | 1 |
| Māori Party | 2** | 1 | 2 | 1 | 1 | 1 | 0 |
| Seats in Parliament | 122 | 121 | 120 | 120 | 120 (Note: The Herald's forecasted numbers are the medians of all likely outcomes for that party. The sum of the parties' forecasted seats does not necessarily equal the total likely seats in Parliament. In this table, "Seats in Parliament" is calculated by adding the number of forecast overhang seats to 120, even if the individual parties' seat projections do not add up to this number.) | 120 (Note: Stuff's projected numbers add up to 119, but this outcome is impossible. Calculation (based on exact percentage) shows that 120th and last seat would be allocated to Labour. Taking into account that the polling average have three significant figures it is not possible to decide which party get the last seat.) | 120 |
| Overall result (majority) | National−NZ First (65) | National−NZ First (64) | Labour−Green−Māori (62) | National–NZ First (63) | National–NZ First (65) | National–NZ First (61) | National–NZ First (65) |
| Overall result (majority) | Labour−Green−NZ First (63) | Labour−Green−NZ First (61) | Labour−Green−Māori (62) | Labour−Green−NZ First (63) | Labour−Green–NZ First (62) | Labour−Green–NZ First (63) | Labour−Green–NZ First (63) |

* indicates an overhang seat

New Zealand does not have a strong tradition of third-party forecast models. Some private individuals have created their own projection models.

== See also ==
- Opinion polling for the 2020 New Zealand general election
- Opinion polling for the 2014 New Zealand general election
- Politics of New Zealand
