= Fifth National Government of New Zealand =

Government of New Zealand from 2008–2017

Fifth National Government
- Ministries of New Zealand
- 2008–2017
- Date formed: 19 November 2008
- Date dissolved: 26 October 2017

People and organisations
- Monarch: Elizabeth II
- Governor-General: Sir Anand Satyanand (2008–2011); Lt Gen Sir Jerry Mateparae (2011–2016); Dame Patsy Reddy (2016–2017)
- Prime Minister: John Key (2008–2016); Bill English (2016–2017)
- Deputy Prime Minister: Bill English (2008–2016); Paula Bennett (2016–2017)
- Member party: National Party; ACT as confidence and supply; United Future as confidence and supply; Māori Party as confidence and supply
- Status in legislature: Minority with confidence and supply from ACT, United Future, Māori
- Opposition party: New Zealand Labour Party; Green Party of Aotearoa New Zealand; Progressive (2008–2011); New Zealand First (2011–2017); Mana Movement (2011–2014)
- Opposition leader: Phil Goff (2008–2011); David Shearer (2011–2013); David Cunliffe (2013–2014); Andrew Little (2014–2017); Jacinda Ardern (2017)

History
- Elections: 2008 general election; 2011 general election; 2014 general election
- Outgoing election: 2017 general election
- Legislature terms: 49th Parliament; 50th Parliament; 51st Parliament
- Budgets: 2009 budget; 2010 budget; 2011 budget; 2012 budget; 2013 budget; 2014 budget; 2015 budget; 2016 budget; 2017 budget
- Predecessor: Fifth Labour Government of New Zealand
- Successor: Sixth Labour Government of New Zealand

The Fifth National Government of New Zealand was the government of New Zealand for three parliamentary terms from 19 November 2008 to 26 October 2017. John Key served as National Leader and prime minister until December 2016, after which Bill English assumed the premiership until the National Government's defeat following the October 2017 government-forming negotiations.

After the 2008 general election the National Party and its allies were able to form a government, taking over from Helen Clark's Fifth Labour Government. It was subsequently reformed after the 2011 general election with a reduced number of seats, and after the 2014 general election with a reduced share of the party vote but the same number of seats. The Government had confidence and supply agreements with the following parties: ACT, United Future, and the Māori Party – which gave the Government a majority on major legislation. The National Party also signed a memorandum of understanding with the Green Party after the 2008 election, but this lapsed in 2011 and was not renewed.

== Significant policies ==
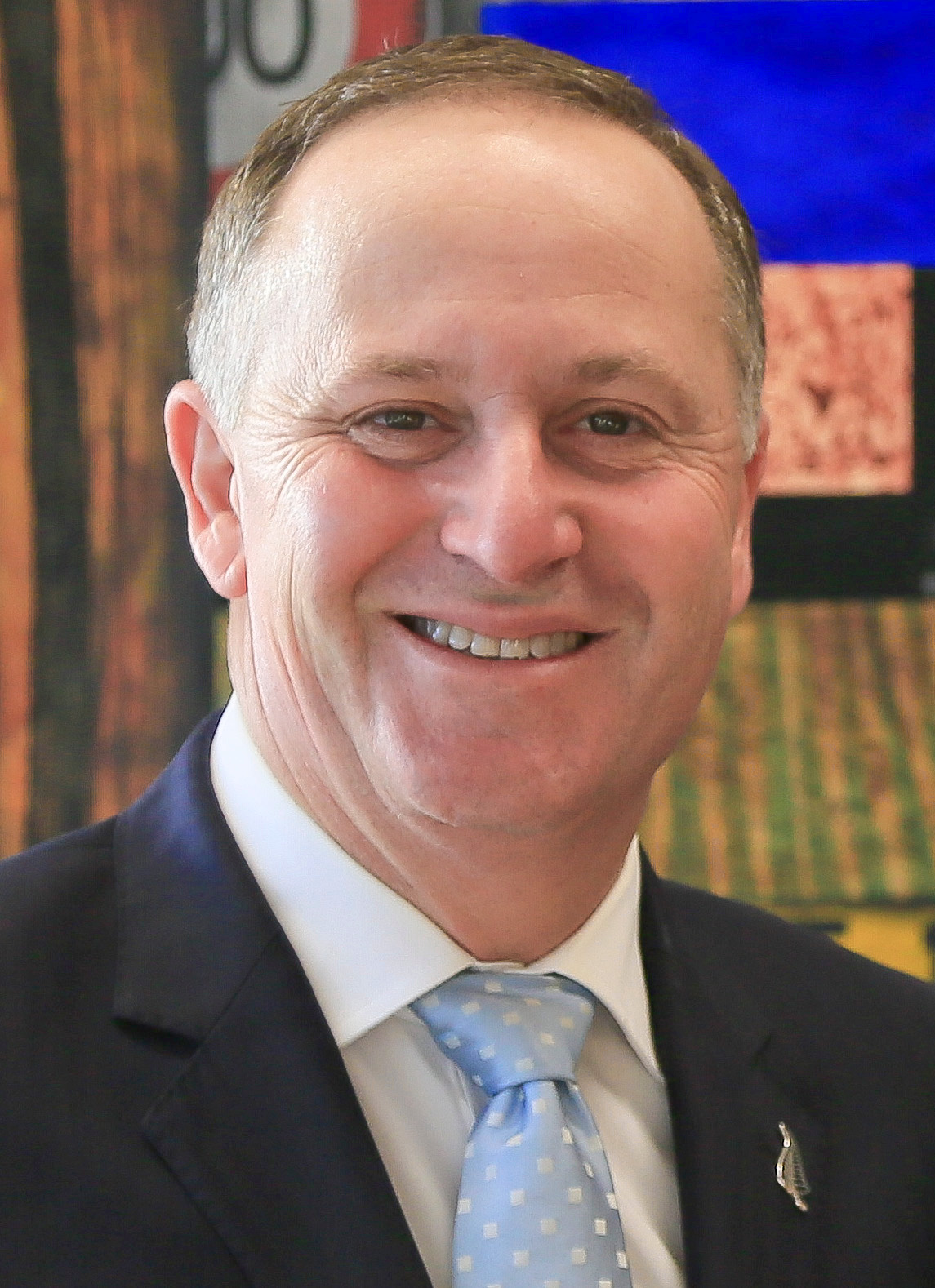
John Key, Prime Minister, (2008–2016)

=== Economic ===
The Government was elected in the context of the late 2000s recession.

- The Fifth Labour Government's Emissions Trading Scheme was delayed and the Emissions Trading Scheme Review Committee was set up to review the New Zealand Emissions Trading Scheme in accordance with the coalition agreement with the ACT Party. In November 2009, an amended version of the New Zealand Emissions Trading Scheme was adopted.
- Personal tax cuts, reducing taxes on all income; the top personal tax rate was lowered from 39% to 38% and then 33%.
- Abolished the Loss Attributing Qualifying Company (LAQC) tax structure, which had allowed individuals (mainly property investors) to reduce their individual income tax by off setting their LAQCs losses (the Look-through company structure replaced LAQCs, but without the tax benefits).
- Increased GST from 12.5% to 15% in October 2010.
- Increased the minimum wage from $12.00 per hour to $13.00 per hour in its first term, and to $14.25 in its second term. This represents a nominal 3.1% average annual increase, significantly lower than the previous government's nominal 7.9% annual average increase.
- Suspended payments to the New Zealand Superannuation Fund.
- Introduced the nine-day working fortnight for businesses who were considering laying off staff.
- Capped the minimum employers' contributions to KiwiSaver at 2%, the amount was due to increase to 4% by 2011 and gave employees the option to contribute as little as 2% of their income to KiwiSaver where previously the smallest contribution amount was 4%. The minimum employee and minimum employer contributions were raised to 3% in April 2013.
- Significant investments in the rebuilding of Christchurch after the Canterbury earthquakes

=== Constitution ===
- Repealed the Electoral Finance Act 2007
- Introduced the Governor-General Act 2010, to reform the Governor-General's salary and allowances.
- A second referendum alongside the 2011 election on the voting system, and after the majority voted in the referendum to retain the existing mixed member proportional system, an independent review on the workings of the MMP system.
- A Constitutional Review (as part of confidence and supply agreement with the Māori Party) starting in 2011.

=== Social policy ===
- Extended the paid parental leave scheme by four weeks
- Introduced the Employment Relations Amendment Act 2008 (the "90-day working bill") in December 2008 which allowed employers with less than 20 staff to dismiss an employee within the first 90 days of employment for no particular reason. In 2010 the bill was extended to all employers.
- Allowed employees to cash in their fourth week of annual leave, employees can now take 3 weeks holiday and be paid for the fourth while still working. The fourth week of annual leave was introduced by the previous government.
- A lifetime limit on student loans was introduced: if a student has studied more than 7 EFTS within their lifetime the student can no longer take out any further loans. Students receiving New Zealand Superannuation Fund payments or Veterans Pension can no longer receive the Student Allowance at the same time. Students are now required to pass more than half of their studies each year to receive a Student Loan or Allowance the following year, previously this requirement only affected the Student Allowance.
- Reformed social security benefits by consolidating seven major benefits into three new ones.
- In 2015, introduced a $790 million of extra spending to reduce hardship among children in New Zealand's poorest families.
- Invested in insulating New Zealand homes via the Warm Up New Zealand: Healthy Homes programme which targets low-income households.

=== Foreign affairs ===
- Allowed a U.S. navy ship into New Zealand for the New Zealand Navy 75th anniversary without confirmation regarding nuclear weapons for the first time in 33 years
- Won a seat on the UN Security Council in the 2014 election, a process that started in 2004.

=== Defence ===
- In 2012, New Zealand and the U.S. signed the Washington Declaration, strengthening military cooperation and defence relations, for the first time in more than 30 years.
- Removal of the position of Minister of Disarmament and Arms Control.
- The government released a new Defence White Paper in 2016, outlining the New Zealand government's strategic defence policy objectives and how the Defence Force will be structured to meet these objectives by 2030 and beyond.

=== National identity ===
- Restored titles ('Sir' and 'Dame') in the New Zealand honours system.
- Officially ended appointments to the Privy Council of the United Kingdom, which would have meant that no new designations of "The Right Honourable" would be made, and that instead ministers will be known simply as "The Honorable". However, on 2 August 2010 it was announced by the Queen of New Zealand that those appointed to offices of Governor-General, Prime Minister, Speaker, and Chief Justice would be given the title "The Right Honourable" for life, "to preserve an important mark of distinction for the holders of the nation's highest public offices". Prime Minister John Key said "he appreciated the title" and also stated "Her Majesty believes it is appropriate also to acknowledge the service of the Governor-General, the Queen's representative in New Zealand, the Speaker, the highest officer in the House of Representatives, and the Chief Justice, the head of the judicial branch of government".
- Two referendums on flag change; one to determine a possible alternative, the other to decide whether to change or not.

=== Education ===
- Introduction of National Standards for primary and intermediate school children.
- Planned to change teacher to student ratios in the 2012 Budget, but withdrew two weeks later due to miscalculations regarding the effect of changes on intermediate schools and public opposition.
- Removal of all student allowances for postgraduate study at University.
- Rejected a bill for state-funded breakfast and lunch to be provided to students at all low-decile schools.
- Invested $359 million to strengthen leadership and quality teaching across schools. This investment created new principal and teacher roles.
- In 2016 invested $883 million in a building programme to deliver various building projects including 480 new classrooms and nine new schools. This includes $168 million for the Christchurch schools rebuild programme.

=== Health ===
- Increased amounts of elective surgery
- Provided free GP visits and free prescriptions for children aged under 13 from July 2015.
- Provided funding for the rheumatic fever prevention programme
- Rebuilt Christchurch Hospital and Burwood Hospitals

=== Infrastructure, energy and natural resources ===
- Introduced the "mixed ownership model" plan, in which the Government planned to reduce its share in Genesis Energy, Meridian Energy, Mighty River Power and Solid Energy from 100% to 51% and Air New Zealand from 74% to 51%, and sell off the remainder. The plans to sell down Solid Energy were later axed due to the company's poor financial position. A citizens-initiated referendum on the sell-downs returned a 67.3% vote in opposition (on a turnout of 45.1%).
- Ultra-Fast Broadband rollout of fibre to the house to 87% of households
- Seven Roads of National Significance

=== Local government ===
- In 2009 and 2010, the Government merged four city councils, three district councils and the Auckland Regional Council into one unitary "Super City" under the Local Government (Auckland Council) Act 2009. The Government's action differed from the recommendations of the Royal Commission on Auckland Governance.
- In March 2010, the Government removed the Environment Canterbury's Councillors and replaced them with appointed commissioners. The elections in 2010 of Environment Canterbury councillors which were pending in 2013 were postponed to ensure a Water Management Plan for Canterbury would be created.

=== Māori issues and the Treaty of Waitangi ===
The involvement of the National government within this particular area was seen through their approach in settlements. National government's involvement of Treaty affairs:

- Ngai Tuhoe deed of settlement

These involved discussion and planning of guidelines which were negotiated with two significant iwis of Taranaki. This also involved Minister for Treaty of Waitangi Negotiations Christopher Finlayson.

- Apology to affiliate Te Arawa

In relation to past Treaty breaches and the actions of the previous governments at the time of the land wars. John Key apologised for the actions and doings of the abuses to the Te Arawa iwi and hapu.

- Negotiation with Te Atiawa and Taranaki iwi

== History ==
=== 2008 election ===
The 2008 general election saw the Fifth National Government elected to power with 44.93 per cent of the popular vote, ending nine years of Labour government. National formed a minority government with confidence-and-supply support from the ACT, United Future and Māori parties. The Governor-General swore Key in as New Zealand's 38th Prime Minister on 19 November 2008.

=== 2011 election ===
The 2011 general election saw the Fifth National Government continue with confidence-and-supply from the ACT, United Future and Maori parties. National increased its share of the party vote to 47.3 percent, but gained only one additional seat to 59 due to a reduced wasted vote (down to 3.4 percent from 6.5 percent in 2008), largely stemming from the return of the New Zealand First party to Parliament after a one term absence. National's increased share of votes however largely came at the expense of its support parties, which saw decreases in vote share and seats. ACT only gained a third of its 2008 vote with 1.07 percent, reducing its seats from five to just one, while the defection of Hone Harawira to form the Mana Party saw the Maori Party's share of vote split, reducing the party to 1.43 percent and reducing the number of seats to three. The United Future Party saw its party vote drop by a quarter to 0.60 percent, but retained its single seat. The reformed Government and its supporters therefore held 50.41 percent of the party vote and 64 of the 121 seats in Parliament.

=== 2014 election ===
The 2014 general election saw the Fifth National Government returned again, gaining a plurality with 47.0% of the party vote and 60 of the 121 seats. On election night counts the party appeared to hold the first majority since 1994 with 61 seats, but lost a list seat (for Maureen Pugh) to the Green Party on the official count (including special votes) of the party vote. National re-entered confidence and supply agreements with the centrist United Future, the classical liberal ACT Party, and the indigenous rights-based Māori Party to form a minority government.

Subsequently, with the sudden resignation of Mike Sabin the National MP for Northland in January 2015, and his replacement in the subsequent 2015 by-election by New Zealand First leader Winston Peters, the government became more dependent on the support parties.

== Election results ==
The table below shows the total party votes for National and the three parties that supported the National-led government. National received support on matters of confidence and supply from ACT, the Māori Party and United Future in each of the three terms. For more details of election results, see the election articles.

Election	Parliament	Seats	Total votes	Percentage	Gain/loss	Seats won	Change	Majority
2008	49th	122	1,215,371	51.84%	-	69	-	7
2011	50th	121	1,127,952	50.41%	–1.43%	64	−5	3
2014	51st	121	1,185,526	49.28%	−1.13%	64	0	3
2017	52nd	120	1,195,730	46.13%	−3.15%	Nat 56, ACT 1	Nat −3, Māori −2, ACT =1, UF -1	-

== Prime minister ==
National Party leader John Key was prime minister between when the government was elected in the 2008 elections, up until his resignation on 12 December 2016.

The National Party held a leadership election to determine Key's successor as National Party leader and prime minister. Deputy Prime Minister Bill English announced that he would be standing for the leadership on 6 December 2016. Health Minister Jonathan Coleman and Police and Corrections Minister Judith Collins also announced their intention to seek the leadership, but dropped out due to low support from National Party colleagues. After Coleman and Collins' withdrawal, English was sworn in as the 39th prime minister on 12 December 2016. State Services Minister Paula Bennett and Transport Minister Simon Bridges announced they would contest the consequential vacancy for Deputy Leader; Bridges dropped out of the race after it was clear Bennett had greater support.

== Cabinet Ministers ==
Portfolio	Minister	Party	Start	End
Prime Minister	John Key	National	19 November 2008	12 December 2016
Prime Minister	Bill English	National	12 December 2016	26 October 2017
Deputy Prime Minister	Bill English	National	19 November 2008	12 December 2016
Deputy Prime Minister	Paula Bennett	National	12 December 2016	26 October 2017
Minister of Agriculture	David Carter	National	19 November 2008	14 December 2011
Minister for Arts, Culture and Heritage	Chris Finlayson	National	19 November 2008	8 October 2014
Minister for Arts, Culture and Heritage	Maggie Barry	National	8 October 2014	26 October 2017
Attorney-General	Chris Finlayson	National	19 November 2008	26 October 2017
Minister of Broadcasting	Steven Joyce	National	19 November 2008	14 December 2011
Minister of Broadcasting	Amy Adams	National	14 December 2011	20 December 2016
Minister of Broadcasting	Simon Bridges	National	20 December 2016	26 October 2017
Minister for Building and Construction	Maurice Williamson	National	19 November 2008	1 May 2014
Minister for Building and Construction	Nick Smith	National	1 May 2014	26 October 2017
Minister for Civil Defence	John Carter	National	19 November 2008	8 June 2011
Minister for Civil Defence	Craig Foss	National	8 June 2011	14 December 2011
Minister for Civil Defence	Chris Tremain	National	14 December 2011	30 January 2013
Minister for Civil Defence	Nikki Kaye	National	30 January 2013	20 December 2016
Minister for Civil Defence	Gerry Brownlee	National	20 December 2016	2 May 2017
Minister for Civil Defence	Nathan Guy	National	2 May 2017	26 October 2017
Minister of Commerce	Simon Power	National	19 November 2008	12 December 2011
Minister of Commerce	Craig Foss	National	12 December 2011	8 October 2014
Minister of Commerce	Paul Goldsmith	National	8 October 2014	20 December 2016
Minister of Commerce	Jacqui Dean	National	20 December 2016	26 October 2017
Minister for the Community and Voluntary Sector	Tariana Turia	Māori Party	19 November 2008	12 December 2011
Minister for the Community and Voluntary Sector	Jo Goodhew	National	12 December 2011	20 December 2016
Minister for the Community and Voluntary Sector	Alfred Ngaro	National	20 December 2016	26 October 2017
Minister of Conservation	Tim Groser	National	19 November 2008	27 January 2010
Minister of Conservation	Kate Wilkinson	National	27 January 2010	22 January 2013
Minister of Conservation	Nick Smith	National	22 January 2013	8 October 2014
Minister of Conservation	Maggie Barry	National	8 October 2014	26 October 2017
Minister of Consumer Affairs	Heather Roy	ACT	19 November 2008	17 August 2010
Minister of Consumer Affairs	John Boscawen	ACT	17 August 2010	3 May 2011
Minister of Consumer Affairs	Simon Power	National	4 May 2011	14 December 2011
Minister of Consumer Affairs	Chris Tremain	National	14 December 2011	3 April 2012
Minister of Consumer Affairs	Simon Bridges	National	3 April 2012	30 January 2013
Minister of Consumer Affairs	Craig Foss	National	30 January 2013	6 October 2014
Minister of Corrections	Judith Collins	National	19 November 2008	12 December 2011
Minister of Corrections	Anne Tolley	National	12 December 2011	8 October 2014
Minister of Corrections	Sam Lotu-Iiga	National	8 October 2014	14 December 2015
Minister of Corrections	Judith Collins	National	14 December 2015	20 December 2016
Minister of Corrections	Louise Upston	National	20 December 2016	26 October 2017
Minister of Customs	Maurice Williamson	National	19 November 2008	1 May 2014
Minister of Customs	Nicky Wagner	National	1 May 2014	2 May 2017
Minister of Customs	Tim Macindoe	National	2 May 2017	26 October 2017
Minister of Defence	Wayne Mapp	National	19 November 2008	14 December 2011
Minister of Defence	Jonathan Coleman	National	14 December 2011	6 October 2014
Minister of Defence	Gerry Brownlee	National	6 October 2014	2 May 2017
Minister of Defence	Mark Mitchell	National	2 May 2017	26 October 2017
Minister of Economic Development	Gerry Brownlee	National	19 November 2008	13 December 2011
Minister of Economic Development	David Carter	National	24 February 2011	13 December 2011
Minister of Economic Development	Steven Joyce	National	13 December 2011	20 December 2016
Minister of Economic Development	Simon Bridges	National	20 December 2016	26 October 2017
Minister of Education	Anne Tolley	National	19 November 2008	12 December 2011
Minister of Education	Hekia Parata	National	12 December 2011	2 May 2017
Minister of Education	Nikki Kaye	National	2 May 2017	26 October 2017
Minister of Energy and Resources	Gerry Brownlee	National	19 November 2008	14 December 2011
Minister of Energy and Resources	Phil Heatley	National	14 December 2011	29 January 2013
Minister of Energy and Resources	Simon Bridges	National	29 January 2013	20 December 2016
Minister of Energy and Resources	Judith Collins	National	20 December 2016	26 October 2017
Minister for the Environment	Nick Smith	National	19 November 2008	21 March 2012
Minister for the Environment	Chris Finlayson	National	21 March 2012	2 April 2012
Minister for the Environment	Amy Adams	National	3 April 2012	6 October 2014
Minister for the Environment	Nick Smith	National	8 October 2014	26 October 2017
Minister of Finance	Bill English	National	19 November 2008	12 December 2016
Minister of Finance	Steven Joyce	National	12 December 2016	26 October 2017
Minister of Fisheries	Phil Heatley	National	19 November 2008	14 December 2011
Minister of Foreign Affairs	Murray McCully	National	19 November 2008	2 May 2017
Minister of Foreign Affairs	Gerry Brownlee	National	2 May 2017	26 October 2017
Minister of Forestry	David Carter	National	19 November 2008	14 December 2011
Minister of Health	Tony Ryall	National	19 November 2008	6 October 2014
Minister of Health	Jonathan Coleman	National	6 October 2014	26 October 2017
Minister of Housing	Phil Heatley	National	19 November 2008	22 January 2013
Minister of Housing	Nick Smith	National	22 January 2013	20 December 2016
Minister of Housing	Amy Adams	National	20 December 2016	26 October 2017
Minister of Immigration	Jonathan Coleman	National	19 November 2008	14 December 2011
Minister of Immigration	Nathan Guy	National	14 December 2011	31 January 2013
Minister of Immigration	Michael Woodhouse	National	31 January 2013	26 October 2017
Minister of Internal Affairs	Richard Worth	National	19 November 2008	2 June 2009
Minister of Internal Affairs	Nathan Guy	National	16 June 2009	13 December 2011
Minister of Internal Affairs	Amy Adams	National	14 December 2011	2 April 2012
Minister of Internal Affairs	Chris Tremain	National	3 April 2012	27 January 2014
Minister of Internal Affairs	Peter Dunne	United Future	28 January 2014	26 October 2017
Minister of Justice	Simon Power	National	19 November 2008	12 December 2011
Minister of Justice	Judith Collins	National	12 December 2011	30 August 2014
Minister of Justice	Amy Adams	National	30 August 2014	26 October 2017
Minister of Labour	Kate Wilkinson	National	19 November 2008	6 November 2012
Minister of Labour	Chris Finlayson	National	6 November 2012	31 January 2013
Minister of Labour	Simon Bridges	National	31 January 2013	26 October 2017
Leader of the House	Gerry Brownlee	National	19 November 2008	2 May 2017
Leader of the House	Simon Bridges	National	2 May 2017	26 October 2017
Minister of Local Government	Rodney Hide	ACT	19 November 2008	14 December 2011
Minister of Local Government	Nick Smith	National	14 December 2011	3 August 2012
Minister of Local Government	David Carter	National	3 August 2012	31 January 2013
Minister of Local Government	Chris Tremain	National	31 January 2013	28 January 2014
Minister of Local Government	Paula Bennett	National	28 January 2014	20 December 2016
Minister of Local Government	Anne Tolley	National	20 December 2016	26 October 2017
Minister for Māori Development	Pita Sharples	Māori Party	19 November 2008	8 October 2014
Minister for Māori Development	Te Ururoa Flavell	Māori Party	8 October 2014	26 October 2017
Minister of Police	Judith Collins	National	19 November 2008	12 December 2011
Minister of Police	Anne Tolley	National	12 December 2011	7 October 2014
Minister of Police	Michael Woodhouse	National	8 October 2014	14 December 2015
Minister of Police	Judith Collins	National	14 December 2015	20 December 2016
Minister of Police	Paula Bennett	National	20 December 2016	26 October 2017
Minister of Revenue	Peter Dunne	United Future	19 November 2008	7 June 2013
Minister of Revenue	Todd McClay	National	7 June 2013	14 December 2015
Minister of Revenue	Michael Woodhouse	National	14 December 2015	20 December 2016
Minister of Revenue	Judith Collins	National	20 December 2016	26 October 2017
Minister for Social Development	Paula Bennett	National	19 November 2008	6 October 2014
Minister for Social Development	Anne Tolley	National	6 October 2014	26 October 2017
Minister for Sport and Recreation	Murray McCully	National	19 November 2008	6 October 2014
Minister for Sport and Recreation	Jonathan Coleman	National	6 October 2014	26 October 2017
Minister for State Owned Enterprises	Simon Power	National	19 November 2008	13 April 2011
Minister for State Owned Enterprises	Tony Ryall	National	13 April 2011	8 October 2014
Minister for State Owned Enterprises	Todd McClay	National	8 October 2014	26 October 2017
Minister of Statistics	Maurice Williamson	National	19 November 2008	1 May 2014
Minister of Statistics	Nicky Wagner	National	1 May 2014	8 October 2014
Minister of Statistics	Craig Foss	National	16 October 2014	20 December 2016
Minister of Statistics	Mark Mitchell	National	20 December 2016	2 May 2017
Minister of Statistics	Scott Simpson	National	2 May 2017	26 October 2017
Minister of Tourism	John Key	National	19 November 2008	12 December 2016
Minister of Tourism	Paula Bennett	National	12 December 2016	26 October 2017
Minister of Trade	Tim Groser	National	19 November 2008	14 December 2015
Minister of Trade	Todd McClay	National	14 December 2015	26 October 2017
Minister of Transport	Steven Joyce	National	19 November 2008	12 December 2011
Minister of Transport	Gerry Brownlee	National	12 December 2011	6 October 2014
Minister of Transport	Simon Bridges	National	6 October 2014	26 October 2017
Minister for Treaty of Waitangi Negotiations	Chris Finlayson	National	19 November 2008	26 October 2017
Minister for Women	Pansy Wong	National	19 November 2008	12 November 2010
Minister for Women	Georgina te Heuheu	National	12 November 2010	8 December 2010
Minister for Women	Hekia Parata	National	8 December 2010	13 December 2011
Minister for Women	Jo Goodhew	National	13 December 2011	8 October 2014
Minister for Women	Louise Upston	National	8 October 2014	20 December 2016
Minister for Women	Paula Bennett	National	20 December 2016	26 October 2017
