= KiwiSaver =

New Zealand savings scheme

The KiwiSaver scheme logo

KiwiSaver is a New Zealand savings scheme. Started operating on 2 July 2007, the scheme allows participants to normally access their KiwiSaver funds only after the age of 65, but can withdraw them earlier in certain limited circumstances, for example if undergoing significant financial hardship or to use as a deposit for a first home.

A policy initiative of the Fifth Labour Government of New Zealand (in office 1999–2008), KiwiSaver is governed by various acts of Parliament, including the KiwiSaver Act 2006, which was passed in September 2006.

As at 31 March 2025, the Financial Markets Authority reported 3,385,856 New Zealand citizens were members of KiwiSaver, with an average balance of $36,349 per member. Annual contributions were $12.2 billion with investment gains of $6.4 billion, and with $123.1 billion in assets managed by KiwiSaver providers.

== Basic operation ==
Anyone who is entitled to live in New Zealand indefinitely and who normally lives in New Zealand is entitled to join KiwiSaver. Those under 18 require parental consent to join. Participants choose to put their savings in one of several "approved savings schemes". They can only belong to one scheme at a time but can change schemes at any time. If they do not choose a scheme, and the participant is aged 18 or over, they will be assigned either to the employer's default scheme or to a government-selected default scheme. Each scheme offers several managed funds to invest the participants' savings in, with varying degrees of expected risk and return.

Contributions are made up of three main components:

- Employee contribution: Employee participants must contribute a minimum of 3% (3.5% starting 1 April 2026, 4%, 6%, 8% or 10% of their gross pay, and can switch rates three months after setting a rate (unless employers agree to a shorter time frame). These contributions are deducted from an employee's pay and sent by the employer to Inland Revenue alongside their PAYE tax returns. The self-employed and unemployed can choose how much they want to contribute. All eligible participants aged 18 to 64 starting a new job, with some exceptions, are automatically enrolled in KiwiSaver. New employees can choose to opt out from day 14 to day 56 of their employment.
- Employer contribution: Employers are required to contribute at least 3% of an employee's gross pay to the employee's KiwiSaver account. The employer contribution is taxed at the employee's "employer superannuation contribution tax" (ESCT) rate. ESCT brackets have slightly higher income thresholds than the corresponding income tax brackets, meaning they are taxed slightly less. So the after tax contribution the employee receives in their account is between 2.135%% and 3.1325%.
- Government contribution: Anyone who contributes over the minimum threshold $1,042.86 between 1 July and 30 June receives a government contribution of $260.72.

From the start of the scheme until May 2015, those who joined KiwiSaver received a $1,000 tax-free "kick start" to their KiwiSaver account from the government. The Fifth National Government removed it effective from 21 May 2015 as part of its 2015 budget. Those aged 16 and over also receive from the government a "member tax credit" (MTC) of 25 cents per dollar contributed (or part thereof) for the first $1,042.86 contributed per year (1 July to 30 June; previously 50 cents per dollar prior to July 2025). The MTC is not a true tax credit; it is a monetary contribution paid by the government via Inland Revenue, mainly to offset the tax paid on interest earned. Those withdrawing KiwiSaver funds to help buy a first home may also get a deposit subsidy of up to $5,000 (existing homes) or $10,000 (new builds) from Housing New Zealand, provided they meet the required income, deposit and house price requirements.

A participant can access all their KiwiSaver contributions once they reach the age of entitlement for New Zealand Superannuation (currently 65), as long as they have been a KiwiSaver member for five years. Otherwise, KiwiSaver contributions can only be accessed (with restrictions) in the following circumstances:

- a one-off withdrawal after three years to help buy a first home
- serious illness or death
- significant financial hardship
- permanent emigration from New Zealand to a country other than Australia

== Mortgage diversion ==
Some provider funds offer a mortgage diversion scheme where some of the employee contributions can be used to make mortgage repayments instead of going towards Kiwisaver after a person has been signed up for 12 months. This is only allowed for repayments on the main home, and not for other properties such as investment or holiday homes. Employer contributions will not be able to be used for the mortgage.

This option was abolished by the National Government that came into power in 2008, though employees who used this option prior to June 2009 can continue to use it as long as their provider offers it.

== Savings suspension ==
Persons on the scheme can take savings suspension (previously known as a contribution holiday) after 12 months for any period from three months to five years without any limits on future savings suspension.

== Children ==
People aged under 18 may join KiwiSaver if the provider allows their enrolment. If not employed, the child has to agree to a level of contributions with the provider. As soon as the child is employed they must contribute and can never opt out. Children are entitled to the tax credits.

As of August 2021, there were 252,000 KiwiSaver members aged under eighteen.

== Funds ==
Each scheme offers several managed funds to invest the participants' KiwiSaver savings in, and members may invest parts of their savings in different funds. Each managed fund has different risks, returns, investment composition and fees.

=== Categories ===
Inland Revenue and the Commission for Financial Literacy and Retirement Income both divide funds into five broad categories, based on their investment composition:

- Cash funds or defensive funds invest less than 10% of savings in growth assets, such as shares and property, and more than 90% of savings in income assets, such as bank deposits and bonds. These funds are low risk but offer low returns.
- Conservative funds invest between 10% and 35% of savings in growth assets and between 65% and 90% in income assets. These funds are a medium-low risk but offer medium-low returns. If a member doesn't choose a fund, or they are in a default scheme, their savings are automatically put into a conservative fund.
- Balanced funds invest between 35% and 63% of savings in growth assets and between 37% and 65% in income assets. These funds offer medium returns with medium risk.
- Growth funds invest between 63% and 90% of savings in growth assets and between 10% and 37% in income assets. These funds offer medium-high returns but with medium-high risk.
- Aggressive funds invest more than 90% of savings in growth assets and less than 10% in income assets. These funds offer high returns but with high risk.

Some providers offer a "lifetime" fund option, which sees the member's savings move to more defensive funds as the member ages. An example may have members aged under 35 in an aggressive fund, those aged 35 to 49 in a growth fund, those aged 50 to 59 in a balanced fund, those aged 60 to 64 in a conservative fund, and those aged 65 and over in a defensive fund.

=== Ethical concerns ===
There have been concerns raised that members are not easily able to choose ethical investing due to a lack of information about the makeup of funds. In particular, investments which include profits the production of cluster munitions, landmines, and nuclear weapons have been highlighted as being illegal in New Zealand.

There are, however, now at least five funds aimed specifically at these concerns, describing themselves as variously as "socially responsible", "The ethical KiwiSaver scheme for Christians", or expressly excluding "companies involved in cluster bombs, landmines, tobacco, gambling and pornography".

== Withdrawing savings ==
As the main purpose of the KiwiSaver fund is for retirement savings, money can be withdrawn from the fund at the age at which the person is eligible for the government superannuation, currently 65, as long as they have been a KiwiSaver member for five years.

However, money can be withdrawn before retirement in a number of circumstances which are outlined in Schedule 1 (KiwiSaver scheme rules), of the KiwiSaver Act 2006.

- After three years contributions can be withdrawn to buy the first home. This excludes the government kickstart of $1000, and until 1 April 2015, the tax credits.
- In the event of significant financial hardship. This excludes the government $1000 kickstart and tax credits.
- In the event of serious illness.
- If a person permanently emigrates from New Zealand to a country other than Australia. This excludes the government tax credit.
- Divorce or the end of a de facto relationship longer than 3 years (less if there are children). KiwiSaver savings earned during the marriage, civil union or de facto relationship are considered relationship property under the Property (Relationships) Act 1976 and can be claimed against by an ex-partner as with any other relationship property. KiwiSaver savings earned prior to the relationship are considered separate property and cannot be claimed against by an ex-partner.
- Death. KiwiSaver savings are paid into the deceased person's estate.

If a New Zealander permanently emigrates to Australia, they may choose to keep their KiwiSaver savings in New Zealand or transfer them to a complying Australian superannuation fund. Likewise, if an Australian permanently emigrates to New Zealand, they may choose to keep the Australian superannuation savings in Australia or transfer them to a complying KiwiSaver fund. Regardless of where the money is held, Australian superannuation savings can be withdrawn once the person turns 60 and retires from working, or turns 65 regardless of employment status. Australian savings cannot be withdrawn to help buy a first home.

== Grant for first home ==
KiwiSaver contributors meeting certain criteria can apply for a cash grant to purchase their first home or a piece of land. This grant is for individuals earning less than $85,000 per year or two or more individuals earning $130,000 per year in total. This grant is in addition to the withdrawing savings option.

== Political issues ==
The KiwiSaver scheme was one of the promises on Prime Minister Helen Clark's controversial 2005 pledge card as part of the Labour Party's promises for that election. In 2008 John Key, then Leader of the Opposition stated that a National led government would mean that "there won't be radical changes...there will be some modest changes to KiwiSaver". KiwiSaver therefore has broad political support.

Additionally, fee subsidy for those people who become members after 1 April 2009, has been removed and for those people who joined before 1 April 2009 only 1 or 2 years fee subsidy will be paid (depending upon the date the member joined).

On 16 July 2009, the governments of New Zealand and Australia announced plans to allow funds in KiwiSaver and Australian superannuation to be transferred between the two schemes. This would allow New Zealanders who have worked in Australia to repatriate their superannuation money to New Zealand, and likewise for Australians who have worked in New Zealand to repatriate their KiwiSaver money to Australia. Trans-Tasman portability of retirement savings came into force on 1 July 2013; from that date, New Zealanders could no longer withdraw their KiwiSaver funds in cash on the basis of permanent emigration to Australia.

In 2012 the National-led government introduced the employer superannuation contribution tax (ESCT). Previously the employer contribution was tax free.

In 2013 Labour said it would like to make the KiwiSaver scheme universal, in the face of the rising cost of superannuation, while financial organisations called for raising the minimum contributions to 7 per cent.

As part of the 2015 New Zealand budget, the National-led Government repealed the $1,000 "kick-start" payment. Following the presentation of the budget, Finance Minister Bill English indicated the government was considering "mass auto-enrolment" of all workers under the age of 65.

In 2025 the National-led government reduced the maximum government contribution from $521.43 to $260.72 from 1 July 2025, and increased the minimum employee and employer contributions from 3% to 3.5% starting 1 April 2026.

=== History ===
KiwiSaver has similarities to the brief New Zealand Superannuation Scheme (not to be confused with the modern NZ Super Fund) established by the Third Labour Government of New Zealand in 1974, scrapped 11 months later by the National Government led by Robert Muldoon. Like the New Zealand Superannuation Scheme was, KiwiSaver is a defined contribution rather than defined benefit approach to retirement savings. Unlike the New Zealand Superannuation Scheme, KiwiSaver accounts and investments are managed by private KiwiSaver providers. The scheme is not compulsory, and funds can be more easily withdrawn.

== Criticisms ==
KiwiSaver has been critiqued as being a part of a strategy to reduce New Zealand Universal Superannuation provision and expand New Zealanders' reliance on private financial institutions to fund retirement income, and can be seen as part of the wider global strategy of pension privatisation originally promoted by the World Bank and others. Winston Peters has critiqued KiwiSaver as a 'billion dollar rort' by the finance industry and proposed alternatively that private KiwiSaver funds should be invested in a government run "KiwiFund" which would invest mainly in New Zealand assets and infrastructure. KiwiSaver has also been criticised for frequent changes by successive governments, including the removal of a number of incentives originally designed to encourage KiwiSaver enrolment. KiwiSaver has been labelled a "poor cousin" by international standards, including comparable government supported schemes in the UK, US, Australia, and Singapore. In most cases the tax advantages in other countries are substantial, and earlier withdrawal options are possible in most cases.

Russel Norman of the Green Party has earlier proposed directing KiwiSaver funds into the New Zealand Superannuation Fund (also known as the "Cullen Fund") to reduce high fees paid to financial industry.

== Enrolment ==
It was announced on 30 August 2007 that nearly 130,000 New Zealanders had signed up for the scheme.

In October 2007, after 3 months of operation, 200,000 people had signed up, leading Revenue Minister Peter Dunne to say that

If take-up continues at this rate it might be easier to make the scheme compulsory, thereby removing the employer compliance costs associated with people opting out.

He said that these were his personal views and not those of the government.

On 6 December 2007, 5 months after the start of KiwiSaver, it was announced that 316,000 people had signed up. Over half were under 45, nearly 20% were under 25, and 33,000 were under 20. By 31 May 2008 uptake had more than doubled to 673,000, with more than $900 million having been paid into KiwiSaver schemes.

KiwiSaver statistics
| As at | Active members | % of population under 65 | Total contributions $m (year) | Total contributions $m (cumulative) |
|---|---|---|---|---|
| 30 June 2008 | 716,600 | 19.2% | 1,037 | 1,037 |
| 30 June 2009 | 1,100,500 | 29.2% | 2,116 | 3,154 |
| 30 June 2010 | 1,459,900 | 38.4% | 2,648 | 5,801 |
| 30 June 2011 | 1,755,900 | 46.0% | 2,911 | 8,712 |
| 30 June 2012 | 1,966,400 | 51.5% | 3,248 | 11,960 |
| 30 June 2013 | 2,146,800 | 56.0% | 3,070 | 15,030 |
| 30 June 2014 | 2,350,600 | 60.9% | 4,096 | 19,126 |
| 30 June 2015 | 2,488,994 | 64.5% | 4,900 | 24,365 |
| 30 June 2016 | 2,608,383 | 72.8% | 5,000 | 33,364 |
| 30 June 2017 | 2,722,147 | 86.77% | 5,500 | 40,800 |

As a comparison, the cost of New Zealand Superannuation for 2014/15 is $11,589 million.

== Similar schemes in other countries ==
- Registered Retirement Savings Plan (RRSP) and Tax-Free Savings Account (TFSA) in Canada
- Individual Retirement Account (IRA) and 401K in the United States
- Self-Invested Personal Pension (SIPP) and Individual Savings Account (ISA) in the United Kingdom
- (Republic of Ireland) Personal Retirement Savings Account (PRSA) in Ireland
- Superannuation in Australia – Australia and New Zealand have a reciprocal agreement allowing New Zealanders moving to Australia to transfer their Australian superannuation scheme to approved KiwiSaver funds, and vice versa.
- iDeCo in Japan
- Employees Provident Fund in India
- Mandatory Provident Fund in Hong Kong
- Vanuatu National Provident Fund – compulsory savings scheme for retirement for employees who receive a salary of Vt3,000 or more a month.
- Central Provident Fund in Singapore
- Employees Provident Fund (Malaysia)
- Pensions in Chile

== See also ==
- Pension
- Pension system
