= 2017 New Zealand budget =

- Submitted by: Steven Joyce
- Presented: 25 May 2017
- Country: New Zealand
- Parliament: New Zealand Parliament
- Party: National
- Surplus: ▲$1.8 billion
- Website: Budget 2017
- ^{ǂ}Numbers in italics are projections.

The New Zealand budget for fiscal year 2017/18 was presented to the New Zealand House of Representatives by Finance Minister Steven Joyce on 25 May 2017. It was the ninth budget of the Fifth National Government, and the first presented by Joyce in his role as Minister of Finance. This was the last budget presented by the Fifth National government which was defeated at the 2017 general election.

== Major announcements ==
=== Economic Development and Infrastructure ===
- $812 million for repairs to State Highway 1 and the Main North rail line between Picton and Christchurch following the November 2016 Kaikōura earthquake.
- $102 million over four years to help develop tourism-related infrastructure such as car parks, toilets and waste facilities.
- $436 million to the City Rail Link project.

=== Environment ===
- $76 million over four years for Department of Conservation tourism-related infrastructure.

=== Finance and Government Administration ===
- Personal income tax thresholds adjusted to give tax cuts from 1 April 2018. New rates are 10.5% on the first $22,000 of income (previously $14,000), 17.5% on income between $22,001 and $52,000 (previously $48,000), 30% from $52,001 to $70,000 (no change), and 33% from $70,001 and up.

=== Health ===
- $60 million over four years to increase Pharmac's pharmaceutical subsidy budget.
- $59.2 million over four years to enable double-crewing of all emergency ambulances.

=== Māori, Other Populations and Cultural ===
- $10.1 million to upgrade Archives New Zealand's and the National Library of New Zealand's long-term storage facilities.

=== Social Development and Housing ===
- Investing NZ$194 million for Social Development initiatives including $64 million to put people into employment and $38 million for the development of a new Social Investment Agency.
- NZ$185 million for social housing including expanding the Housing First programme and a housing pathway for newly-released inmates.

== Reaction ==
As is tradition, the Leader of the Opposition, Andrew Little, moved a motion of no confidence in reply to the Budget speech.
