= Government Communications Security Bureau Act 2003 =

Act of Parliament in New Zealand

New Zealand Parliament
- Royal assent: 1 April 2003
- Repealed: 28 September 2017
- Administered by: Government Communications Security Bureau

Legislative history
- Passed: 2003
- Status: Repealed

The Government Communications Security Bureau Act 2003 is a repealed New Zealand Act of Parliament. It formalised the role of the Government Communications Security Bureau (the GCSB), which had previously existed in various states of secrecy since 1977, as the national authority for signals intelligence and information systems security, and put it on a similar legislative footing to the New Zealand Security Intelligence Service.

The Act also specified the objective and functions of the GCSB, and the conditions under which the GCSB must operate. The Minister responsible for the Act was, by convention, the Prime Minister.

The Act was repealed and replaced with the Intelligence and Security Act 2017.

== Amendment and review ==
Controversial changes to the Act (the "GCSB Bill") were announced by Prime Minister John Key in May 2013. The intention of the GCSB Bill was to update the GCSB statutory framework to respond to the changing security environment and public law environment, and to enhance the external oversight mechanisms that apply to the intelligence agencies by strengthening the office of the Inspector-General of Intelligence and Security and by improving the operation of Parliament's Intelligence and Security Committee.

The Labour Party was opposed to the GCSB Bill. It stated it would review the law and if necessary repeal it. Dame Anne Salmond, who is a distinguished professor at the University of Auckland and the then New Zealander of the Year, condemned the legislation as being in breach of the Bill of Rights. Protests were held around the country in July and August 2013, with speakers at one event in Auckland including Salmond, unionist Helen Kelly and Internet tycoon Kim Dotcom, who had previously been illegally spied on by the GCSB. Despite the protests, the changes were passed by Parliament and came into force in August 2013.

The GCSB Bill also amended the Intelligence and Security Committee Act 1996 to require an independent review of the New Zealand intelligence agencies and the legislation governing them every five to seven years. The Government opened the first Independent Review of Intelligence and Security in 2015. Former Labour deputy prime minister Sir Michael Cullen and future governor-general Dame Patsy Reddy were appointed as independent reviewers.

== Repeal ==
The Independent Review reported back on 29 February 2016, making 107 recommendations. A key recommendation was to repeal four enactments that provide the statutory framework for the functions and oversight of the New Zealand intelligence agencies and to replace them with a single Intelligence and Security Act. The Government agreed to most of the recommendations, and introduced the Intelligence and Security Bill. This Bill repealed the GCSB Act, the New Zealand Security Intelligence Service Act 1969, the Intelligence and Security Committee Act 1996 and the Inspector-General of Intelligence and Security Act 1996. These acts are now consolidated as the Intelligence and Security Act 2017.

== See also ==
- New Zealand intelligence agencies
- Lists of Statutes of New Zealand
