= 2013 New Zealand budget =

- Submitted by: Bill English
- Presented: 16 May 2013
- Parliament: Parliament of New Zealand
- Party: National
- Total revenue: ▲$68.4 billion
- Total expenditures: ▲$72.4 billion
- Program Spending: $5.1 billion
- Deficit: ▲ -$6.3 billion
- Debt: ▼$58 billion (Net) ▼26.2% Net debt to GDP
- Website: http://www.treasury.govt.nz/budget/2013
- ^{ǂ}Numbers in italics are projections.

The New Zealand budget for fiscal year 2013/14 was presented to the New Zealand House of Representatives by Finance Minister Bill English on 16 May 2013. This was the fifth budget English has presented as Minister of Finance.

== Outline ==
Budget 2013 "progressed the Government's programme while on track to surplus":

- Forecast economic growth to average between 2 and 3% a year to 2017;
- $100 million per annum on "internationally focused growth and innovation package to boost investment in science, research and development, and tourism."
- $1.5 billion additional of investments from the Future Investment Fund to spend proceeds from the Government's Mixed Ownership Model:
  - $426 million for the redevelopment of Christchurch and Burwood Hospitals. As announced previously, this will be the single biggest hospital investment in New Zealand's history.
  - $50 million to speed up the School Network Upgrade Project, which will see state school local area networks (LAN) upgraded to handle increased digital technology usage and the arrival of fibre optic internet access.
  - $94 million for the fourth year of KiwiRail's Turnaround Plan.
  - $80 million for irrigation projects, as announced previously.
  - Meridian Energy will be the next company to be partially privatised under the "mixed ownership model" plan, in the second half of 2013 pursuant to market conditions.
  - Legislation will be introduced to improve housing affordability by delivering flexible regulatory tools to councils under accords between the Government and councils in areas where housing is least affordable.
  - A memorandum of understanding with the Reserve Bank Governor confirms a range of measures, if required, to protect the economy from periods of excessive growth in credit and asset prices, and to promote financial system stability.
  - A number of revenue measures, including a proposal to allow loss-making start-up companies to claim tax losses on research and development.
- Cuts to Accident Compensation Corporation levies on households and businesses of $300 million in 2014/15, increasing to $1 billion in 2015/16;
- Provides significant extra money to help low-income families through a number of targeted initiatives.
- $5.1 billion of new operating spending in the current year and over the next four years for initiatives across areas such as health, education, welfare, and housing.
- $2.1 billion additional to help rebuild Christchurch, taking the Government's total share of the rebuild to around $15 billion.

(All figures for four years to 2016/17 unless otherwise stated).

The 2013 budget re-iterated the Government's targets – returning to surplus by 2014/15 and bringing net government debt back down to 20% of GDP by 2020:

- Forecasts show an operating surplus before gains and losses of $75 million in 2014/15 – compared to the record $18.4 billion deficit in 2010/11.
- Net core Crown debt is forecast to peak at 28.7% of GDP in 2014/15, before falling to 17.6% of GDP by 2020/21.
- Core Crown expenses are expected to drop below 31% of GDP by 2014/15, down from 35% of GDP two years ago.

Budget 2013 confirmed the Government's decisions to cap and reduce debt:

- The operating allowance is $900 million in Budget 2013, compared with $800 million signalled previously, and $1 billion in Budget 2014, compared with $1.2 billion signalled previously. From 2015 onwards, operating allowances will grow by 2% per Budget.
- The Government intends to delay contributions to the New Zealand Superannuation Fund until net core Crown debt is no higher than 20% of GDP. This is expected in 2020/21.

== Public services ==
The Ministerial Committee on Poverty has endorsed a number of important initiatives to help low-income families. They include:

- $100 million over three years for the Warm Up New Zealand: Healthy Homes programme targeting low-income households, particularly those with children or high health needs, for home insulation.
- More than $21 million over the next four years for rheumatic fever prevention.
- An extra $1.5 million for Budgeting Services in 2013/14, in addition to the $8.9 million provided already in 2012/13.
- A whiteware procurement programme to enable beneficiaries to purchase new appliances under warranty using Ministry of Social Development repayable grants.
- A commitment to investigate and pilot a partnership with NGOs and financial institutions to support the provision of low or no interest loans for low-income borrowers.
- The trial on Housing New Zealand properties of a Warrant of Fitness programme for rental housing.

== Welfare ==
$188.6 million extra over four years in social welfare. This follows a $287.5 million investment in Budget 2012, and includes:

- 354 extra Work and Income staff to provide intensive help and support.
- People receiving the sole parent support or supported living payments, who go off the benefit and don't have work expectations to retain some of their benefit in the first few weeks.
- Additional funding to allow Work and Income to contract external providers to deliver case management and wrap-around services for particular groups of beneficiaries.
- Further developing the investment approach to welfare.
- Additional funding to provide for an independent workability assessment by experts to establish a client's work-readiness.

== Health ==
$1.6 billion additional is to be spent on public health over four years for new health initiatives and to meet cost pressures and population growth. This takes total health spending to $14.7 billion in 2013/14. $1 billion of this extra funding goes to District Health Boards to take account of population changes and inflationary pressures. Extra health spending over the next four years includes:

- $70 million for aged care and dementia services.
- $35.5 million for diabetes and heart disease.
- $100 million extra to meet population changes and cost pressures in disability support services.
- $48 million for more elective operations such as hip replacements and cataracts.
- $25 million to increase the number of people being screened for diseases, particularly breast cancer.
- More than $21 million to reduce the incidence of rheumatic fever and undertake rheumatic fever vaccine research.
- $18.2 million for a new mothers and babies initiative, with details to be announced shortly.
- $12.8 million for patients with long-term conditions such as diabetes and asthma.
- $7.3 million for 20 additional medical student places.
- $7 million to increase coverage of preventative health tests for four-year-olds.
- $4.3 million to improve care and men's awareness of prostate cancer.

== Education ==
In the current year and over the next four years, around $900 million extra will be spent on education initiatives across early childhood, primary and secondary education. The total spending in these sectors will be $9.7 billion in 2013/14.

Extra education spending in the current year and over the next four years includes:

- $173 million for early childhood education, including $41 million for equity funding and $39 million for universal subsidies.
- $215 million for schooling, including nearly $80 million for operations grants, $64 million for Positive Behaviour for Learning and $38 million for teaching quality initiatives.
- $92.4 million for Greater Christchurch Education Recovery and Renewal and 21st Century Schools.
- $73.1 million of operating expenditure to support the ongoing maintenance and costs of the school property network.

More than $130 million over four years and reprioritised funding in tertiary education. It includes:

- $36 million for the expansion of Māori and Pasifika trades training.
- $27 million to boost funding for science and engineering courses.
- Nearly $29 million to equalise funding rates between Private Training Establishments and Tertiary Education Institutions.
- $32 million to support an increase in the proportion of young people with higher-level qualifications.

== Law and order ==
- Police will reprioritise more than $160 million over several years to give frontline officers access to new technology such as smartphones and tablets, which will improve their performance and productivity.
- The Ministry of Justice will receive $4.4 million from the Justice Sector Fund to expand its restorative justice services.
- The Department of Corrections will invest $10 million over two years from the Justice Sector Fund to increase support for offenders after their release, with the goal of reducing reoffending.

== Housing ==
- $26.6 million to extend the income-related rent subsidy scheme to non-government providers.
- Legislation will allow community housing providers to become registered prior to receiving an income related rent subsidy for new, eligible tenants.
- $46.8 million to extend reviewable tenancies to all Housing Corporation tenants who signed up to their existing properties before 1 July 2011.
- Responsibility for assessing entitlement to social housing support will be shifted from Housing New Zealand to the Ministry of Social Development.

== Christchurch Rebuild ==
- The total estimated cost of the earthquake damage in Christchurch has been increased to $40 billion from the $30 billion of previous estimates.
- Budget 2013 confirms $2.1 billion of additional government funding to the earthquake recovery, including $900 million of new capital from the Future Investment Fund. This will take the Government's total share of the rebuild to around $15 billion. This extra funding includes:
- An additional $300 million earmarked for the Central City recovery.
- Funding for final land zoning decisions.
- Work of the Canterbury Earthquake Recovery Authority.
- Redevelopment of the Christchurch and Burwood hospitals, a justice and emergency services precinct, and tertiary education institutions.

== Reactions ==
Business New Zealand welcomed the budget, but also added that it wanted to see "bolder reform in the areas such as retirement savings and age of eligibility for superannuation and interest-free student loans." President of the New Zealand Council of Trade Unions, Helen Kelly said the budget "has not addressed the big issues" and said the budget did nothing to "support struggling families; it does not do enough to alleviate our shocking child poverty and continues to prioritise short-term debt reduction over creating jobs and fairness."
