= Vanuatu National Provident Fund =

Agency overview
- Formed: 1986
- Jurisdiction: Government of Vanuatu
- Motto: Sevem Tudei, Enjoyem Tumoro ("Save today, enjoy tomorrow")
- Agency executive: Parmod Achary, General Manager

The Vanuatu National Provident Fund (VNPF) is a compulsory pension scheme in Vanuatu. It was established in 1986 and commenced operation in 1987. The General Manager is Parmod Achary.

From 1992 to 1995 VNPF was involved in controversy due to its housing loan scheme. In 2017 an inquiry found that it was "poorly managed and suffered from interference from a board unqualified and ill-suited to the task."
