= 2016 New Zealand budget =

- Submitted by: Bill English
- Presented: 26 May 2016
- Country: New Zealand
- Parliament: Parliament of New Zealand
- Party: National
- Total revenue: ▲$78.5b
- Total expenditures: ▲$77.4b
- Surplus: ▲$1.1b
- Debt: ▲$62.3b net debt ▼24.9% net debt to GDP
- Website: www.treasury.govt.nz/budget/2016
- ^{ǂ}Numbers in italics are projections.

The New Zealand budget for fiscal year 2016/17 was presented to the New Zealand House of Representatives by Finance Minister Bill English on 26 May 2016. It was the eighth budget English has presented as Minister of Finance, and the eighth budget of the Fifth National Government.

== Breakdown by sector ==
=== Economic Development and Infrastructure ===
- $22.2 million over four years to increase national cyber security, including establishing a new government agency to assist in detecting and responding to cyber security threats.
- $20 million over four years to the tourism sector, to fund small infrastructure projects to cope with increasing tourist numbers and to target growing tourism markets.

=== Education ===
- $15.3 million over four years to provide extra teacher aide support for students with special needs.

=== Health ===
- $39 million extra funding in 2016/17 and $124 million over four years to increase Pharmac's annual pharmaceutical budget.

=== Māori, Other Populations and Cultural ===
- $303 million over five years to combine the New Zealand Fire Service, the National Rural Fire Authority and rural fire authorities into one organisation.
- $12.6 million over four years to the Māori Housing Network for Māori housing projects.

=== Social Development and Housing ===
- $41.1 million over four years to provide for 3000 emergency housing places.
