= 2012 New Zealand budget =

- Submitted by: Bill English
- Country: New Zealand
- Parliament: Parliament of New Zealand
- Party: National
- Total revenue: ▲$60.6 billion
- Total expenditures: ▼$69.1 billion
- Deficit: ▲ -$9.2 billion
- Debt: ▼$50.7b (Net) ▼24.3% (Net debt to GDP)

The New Zealand budget for fiscal year 2012–2013 was presented to the New Zealand House of Representatives by Finance Minister Bill English on 24 May 2012.

This was the fourth budget Bill English has presented as Minister of Finance.

== Outline ==
Budget 2012 set out the Government's main priorities:

- Responsibly managing the Government's finances.
- Building a more productive and competitive economy.
- Delivering better public services within tight financial constraints.
- Rebuilding Christchurch.

The Budget set out $4.4 billion of new operating spending over the succeeding four years matched by a combination of savings and revenue initiatives.

Budget forecasts show an operating deficit before gains and losses of $8.4 billion in 2011/12, which compares with the $12.1 billion deficit forecast in the Budget Policy Statement in February 2012. This reflects lower-than-expected government spending and a delay in some expenses, such as earthquake costs.

The Budget forecast the deficit falling to $7.9 billion in 2012/13 and $2 billion in 2013/14, before a $197 million surplus in 2014/15.

The forecasts also showed Budget decisions will keep net core Crown debt below 30% of gross domestic product. It forecast a peak at 28.7% of GDP in 2013/14.

Budget forecasts also showed economic growth picking up from 2% in 2012 to more than 3% in 2014 and 2015.

The Treasury forecast a further 154,000 New Zealanders to gain work over the next four years, on top of the 60,000 increase in employment over the past two years.

The Government's annual spending on science and innovation increased by $385 million over four years, taking total science and innovation spending across government to more than $1.3 billion by 2015/16.

Free "Youth Guarantee" places increased to 3,000 at a cost of $37.7 million over four years.

The Government established the Future Investment Fund to invest the expected $5 billion to $7 billion proceeds from selling minority shares in five state-owned enterprises, into modern schools and hospitals, innovation, and transport.

The fund's first $558.8 million allocation is:

- The first $33.8 million of $1 billion ring-fenced for modernising and transforming New Zealand schools as part of the Government's 21st Century Schools program.
- A further $250 million towards the KiwiRail Turnaround Plan.
- $88.1 million for the health sector, most of which will go towards hospital redevelopments.
- $76.1 million for the creation of the Advanced Technology Institute.

In addition to the previously announced target of having 85% of 18-year-olds achieving NCEA Level 2 or equivalent qualification in five years, the Budget added two more measurable targets for the next three to five years:

- Reducing prisoner reoffending by 25% by 2017. Reaching this target would mean 18,500 fewer victims of crime every year.
- Increasing the rate of participation in early childhood education to 98% by 2016 from 94.7% currently.

In the first phase of welfare reform, Budget 2012 invests $287.5 million on education and training. This includes $148.8 million over four years for youth services, including wrap-around support.

Over the four years from 2012, the Government is committed almost $1.5 billion extra to health. District Health Boards will receive $1.11 billion of additional funding.

Education will focus on increasing student achievement. Over the next four years, the Government will commit $511.9 million towards new early childhood and schooling initiatives, in addition to setting aside further funding in tagged contingencies. In tertiary education, the Government will continue to better target student assistance to where it is most needed and ensure better value for taxpayers.

=== Rebuilding Christchurch ===
Budget 2012 continued the Government's commitment to rebuilding Christchurch following the 2010 and 2011 earthquakes. The total cost of the damage was estimated at more than $20 billion.

$5.5 billion was allocated in the 2011 New Zealand budget for the Canterbury Earthquake Recovery Fund, and the Canterbury Earthquake Recovery Authority was established. More than $3.46 billion of the Recovery Fund was forecast to have been spent by June 2013, with the rest to be spent by 2015/16.

== Analysis ==
The New Zealand Herald's Brian Fallow noted a higher than expected tax take and lower spending gave the deficit a "rosier glow". Fran O'Sullivan criticised the government for "side-stepping" the issue of New Zealand's ageing population.
