= Colmar Brunton =

Former New Zealand market research agency

- The logo of Colmar Brunton as of 2007
- Type: Private
- Industry: Market research
- Founded: 1981 (New Zealand)
- Founders: Dick Brunton, Pauline Colmar
- Defunct: 2020 (Australia), 2021 (New Zealand)
- Fate: Merged into Kantar Group
- Headquarters: Auckland, New Zealand (NZ); * Sydney, Australia (AU)
- Area served: Asia-Pacific
- Key people: Dick Brunton, Pauline Colmar
- Services: Market research, qualitative and quantitative studies
- Parent: Kantar Group

Colmar Brunton was a market research agency founded in New Zealand in 1981. It was later merged with Kantar in Australia and New Zealand in 2020–21.

== Services ==
There are two Colmar Brunton organizations, which operate in the Asia Pacific Region. The first Colmar Brunton was founded in New Zealand and operated with its head office in Auckland. Colmar Brunton Australia is an international market research agency split from Colmar Brunton New Zealand in the 1990s.

== New Zealand ==
Colmar Brunton was formed by Dick Brunton and Pauline Colmar in 1986. Millward Brown bought a 20% stake in Colmar Brunton in 2005.

The brand was retired in 2021 after Colmar Brunton was merged with the Kantar Group.

== Australia ==
Colmar Brunton Australia is Australia's largest independent market research agency. Its head office is in Sydney, with offices in the cities of Melbourne, Brisbane, Adelaide and Canberra. It specialises in qualitative and quantitative research, using a wide variety of research methodologies. Its sister companies also provide performance benchmarking and marketing consultancy services.

Colmar Brunton has undertaken work for the Government of Australia through various agencies and departments. In 2011. The firm provided services related to "Evaluation of Welfare Reform and Employment" in the NTER. In 2015, Colmar Brunton provided services to the government agency Austrade.

Other agencies and departments that have engaged Colmar Brunton include the Department of Families, Housing, Community Services and Indigenous Affairs, Medicare Australia, Department of Health, Attorney-General's Department, Australian Taxation Office, Family Court and Federal Circuit Court, Department of Immigration and Border Protection, Department of Finance, Department of Education, Department of the Treasury and the Australian Competition & Consumer Commission.

The Government of South Australia engaged Colmar Brunton to provide market research services for the Motor Accident Commission from 2008 to 2010 and 2011 until 2013. In 2016, Colmar Brunton won a $1 million 6-month contract to provide Nuclear Fuel Cycle Research Services to the Department of the Premier and Cabinet of the Government of South Australia. In February. the work was awarded during the Nuclear Fuel Cycle Royal Commission, with work undertaken from June through December.

Colmar Brunton has worked for the Victorian Government and the Queensland Government.

Colmar Brunton's private sector clients include Fuji Xerox, Canstar Blue, the Australian Farmers Markets Association, the Bavarian Beer Cafe, and others.

In December 2019, the Kantar Group acquired Colmar Brunton as part of its acquisition of WPPAUNZ's Data Investment Management division. In February 2020, Colmar Brunton in Australia was fully integrated into Kantar, and the Colmar Brunton brand retired in Australia.
