= 2014 New Zealand budget =

- Submitted by: Bill English
- Presented: 15 May 2014
- Country: New Zealand
- Parliament: Parliament of New Zealand
- Party: National
- Total revenue: ▲$70.9 billion
- Total expenditures: ▲$71.5 billion
- Deficit: ▲ -$684m
- Debt: ▼$59.4 billion (Net) ▲25.6% (Net debt to GDP)
- Website: www.treasury.govt.nz/budget/2014
- ^{ǂ}Numbers in italics are projections.

The New Zealand budget for fiscal year 2014/15 was presented to the New Zealand House of Representatives by Finance Minister Bill English on 15 May 2014. This was the sixth budget English has presented as Minister of Finance.

== Reactions ==
- Economics commentator Bernard Hickey said the budget "buried" a "[p]opulation forecast [that] will mean higher interest rates".
- Political columnist John Armstrong stated the budget "robs Labour of election punch".
