= 2011 New Zealand budget =

- Submitted by: Bill English
- Parliament: Parliament of New Zealand
- Party: National
- Total revenue: ▲$57 billion
- Total expenditures: ▲$72.8 billion
- Deficit: ▼ -$16.7 billion
- Debt: ▼$41.5 billion (Net) ▼20.8% (Net debt to GDP)
- ^{ǂ}Numbers in italics are projections.

The New Zealand budget for fiscal year 2011-2012 was presented to the New Zealand House of Representatives by Finance Minister Bill English on 19 May 2011.

This was the third budget Bill English has presented as Minister of Finance.

== Outline ==
Budget 2011 was delivered following earthquakes which devastated Christchurch and included a $5.5 billion rebuild package for the city.

The 2011 Budget was a "zero Budget" meaning no net new spending over four years. $5.2 billion was prioritised over four years for spending on mostly targeted at health, education and infrastructure. Individual and employer KiwiSaver contributions were increased.

The Budget announced the part-sale of five state-owned enterprises with the Government keeping majority (51%) control.

The 2011 Budget forecast a return to fiscal surplus to 2014/15.
