= 2015 New Zealand budget =

- Submitted by: Bill English
- Presented: 21 May 2015
- Country: New Zealand
- Parliament: Parliament of New Zealand
- Party: National
- Total revenue: ▲$71b
- Total expenditures: ▲$70.5b
- Surplus: ▲$414m
- Debt: ▲$60.6b net debt ▼25.1% net debt to GDP
- Website: www.treasury.govt.nz/budget/2015
- ^{ǂ}Numbers in italics are projections.

The New Zealand budget for fiscal year 2015/16 was presented to the New Zealand House of Representatives by Finance Minister Bill English on 21 May 2015. It was the seventh budget English presented as Minister of Finance.

In response to the budget, Leader of the Opposition Andrew Little called it a "fiddle-it-round budget, a fudge-it budget", while New Zealand First leader Winston Peters called it a "Split Enz budget – I see red, I see red, I see red".
