= Tākuta Ferris =

Member of parliament in New Zealand

Tākuta Ferris MP
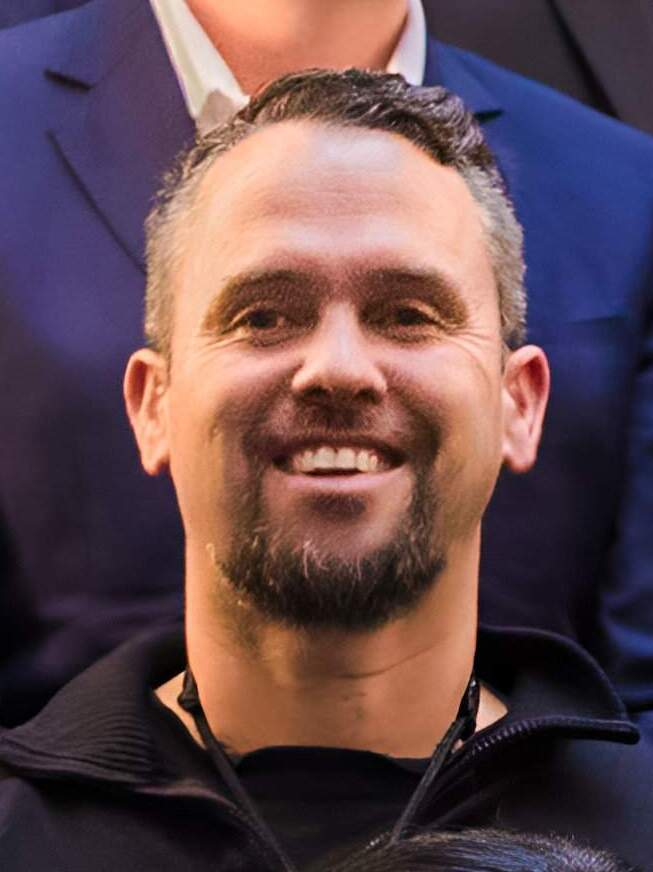
- Ferris in 2023

Member of the New Zealand Parliament for Te Tai Tonga
- In office 14 October 2023 – 7 November 2026
- Preceded by: Rino Tirikatene
- Succeeded by: Mananui Ramsden

Personal details
- Born: 1978 (age 47–48)
- Party: Te Pāti Māori (2023–2025); Independent (2025–present)
- Relatives: Piri Sciascia (uncle)

Tākuta "Doc" Ferris (born 1978) is a New Zealand politician, currently representing Te Tai Tonga in the New Zealand House of Representatives as an independent. He was elected at the 2023 general election as a Te Pāti Māori candidate. Ferris was expelled from the party in November 2025. He subsequently contested the 2026 general election as an independent candidate and was unseated by New Zealand Labour Party candidate Mananui Ramsden.

== Early life and career ==
Ferris was born in 1978 and was named after his father, Doc Ferris Snr. Ferris Snr got his name from the doctor, Dr. Romaine, that saved both his and his mother's lives during a difficult birth. Tākuta simply means 'doctor' in Māori.

Piri Sciascia was his uncle. Ferris has a degree in Māori design and art, as well as a degree in mātauranga Māori, both from Te Wānanga o Raukawa. He is of the Ngāi Tahu, Ngāti Kuia, Ngāti Kahungunu and Ngāti Porou iwi. Ferris was a lecturer and adviser at Massey University's Manawatū campus. He describes himself as "a fisherman, a diver, and an artist".

== Political career ==
=== 2020 election campaign ===
On 10 May 2020, Tākuta Ferris was selected as the Māori Party candidate for Te Tai Tonga for the 2020 election. Ferris was quoted as saying that "the status quo is no longer acceptable. It is our responsibility to challenge it and change the development narrative for our tamariki and mokopuna." Ferris was beaten by the incumbent, Rino Tirikatene, by a margin of over 6,800 votes. Following the announcement of the proposed closure of the Tiwai Point Aluminium Smelter, Ferris called for the government to put whānau first, arguing that central and regional government should intervene with an aim for a more diversified regional economy.

=== 2023 election campaign ===
Ferris was re-selected to stand in Te Tai Tonga for Te Pāti Māori in the 2023 election. (Note: During 2023, the Māori Party formally changed its name to Te Pāti Māori) His campaign strategy targeted younger voters because older people are "entrapped in the status quo". He stated he intended to increase support for himself from younger people over three to fifteen years as they grow up. Ferris stood in for his party's co-leaders in The Press leaders' debate. He was praised for his contributions to the debate; despite sparring against two senior politicians—Winston Peters and David Seymour—Ferris "stood out from the pack" and was "shining". However, journalists considered Ferris "still has little chance of making it to Parliament" since the incumbent Tirikatene's family had represented Te Tai Tonga and its predecessor electorate for 72 of the last 91 years and an opinion poll in late September 2023 had Tirikatene ahead with an 11-point margin. Despite these predictions, Ferris defeated Tirikatene with a 2,800-vote margin.

New Zealand Parliament
Years	Term	Electorate	List	Party
2023–2025	54th	Te Tai Tonga	5	Te Pāti Māori
2025–2026	Changed allegiance to:			Independent

=== First term, 2023–2026 ===
During his maiden speech on 12 December, Ferris stated that he was there not to service the needs of the New Zealand House of Representatives but rather to "contest it." He also criticised the National-led coalition government's policies which he claimed attacked Māori language and culture. He was appointed Te Pāti Māori's education, Te Tiriti o Waitangi, justice, police, corrections, drug law reform, water, fisheries, forestry, broadcasting and public service spokesperson and sits on Parliament's justice committee.

On 25 September 2024, Speaker of the House Gerry Brownlee referred Ferris to Parliament's Privileges Committee after he made remarks accusing members of Parliament of lying. He said:

"Politicians call this obfuscation. The art of making something unclear, intentionally vague, ambiguous, to conceal or obscure the truth, to confuse others. Lies – in other words. Many in this House are masters of it, and it is a disservice to those who voted you into your positions."

In response, New Zealand First leader Winston Peters called for a point of order. When Brownlee asked Ferris to withdraw the comment and apologise, he denied making the comment. Brownlee referred Ferris to the Privileges Committee on the grounds that Ferris had "deliberately misled" the House. The Committee reported back in February 2025, finding that Ferris did deliberately mislead the House and recommended that he apologise.

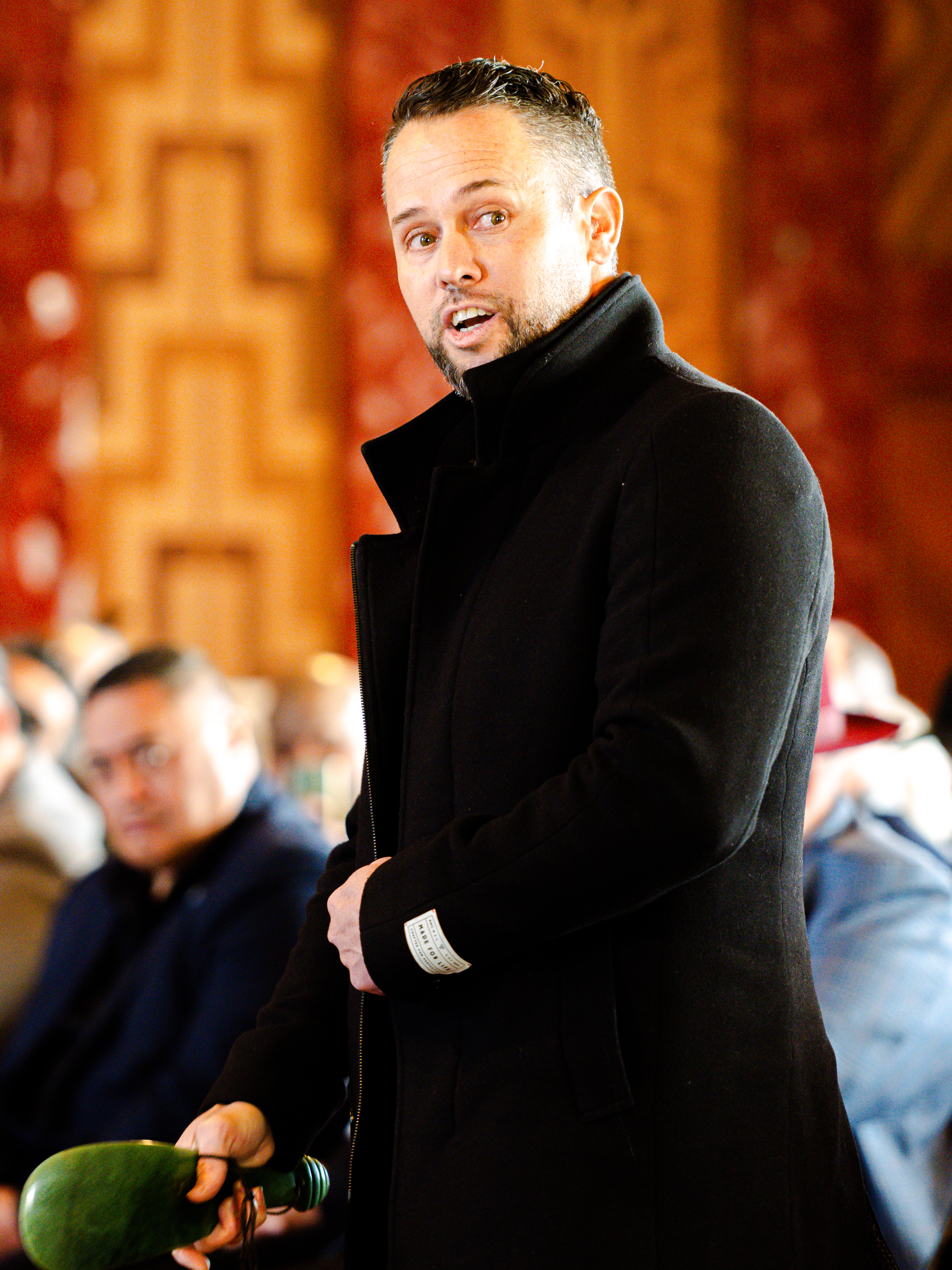
Ferris in 2024

In early September 2025, Ferris published a controversial social media post criticising the ethnicity of several Labour Party campaign volunteers during the 2025 Tāmaki Makaurau by-election. In response, Te Pāti Māori disavowed Ferris' post, issued an apology and ordered him to remove it. Labour MP Willie Jackson condemned Ferris' social media remarks as offensive and reiterated his party's commitment to representing all ethnic communities. Following the by-election, the Electoral Commission confirmed it was investigating a social media post by Ferris published on the day of the by-election urging people to vote for Te Pāti Māori.

Around midnight 10 September 2025, Ferris released an Instagram video defending his earlier social media post criticising non-Māori Labour campaign volunteers during the Tāmaki Makaurau election. In the video, Ferris said that the presence of these volunteers "reflected attempts to homogenise Māori as just another minority group rather than tangata whenua ("People of the Land") with distinct rights under the Treaty of Waitangi." Te Pāti Māori released a statement distancing themselves from Ferris' remarks and said they would respond to Ferris' remarks. Ferris' video remarks were criticised by politicians from across the political spectrum including Green Party co-leader Marama Davidson, Labour leader Chris Hipkins, National Party MP and Minister of Māori Development Tama Potaka, New Zealand First leader Winston Peters and cabinet minister Shane Jones.

In response, the anti-racism group "People's Action Plan Against Racism in Aotearoa" met with TPM leaders to raise concerns about Ferris' remarks and to discuss how to respond the situation. On 11 September, Ferris defended his social media posts during an interview with ThreeNews. On 12 September, TPM President John Tamihere confirmed that Ferris was undergoing a tikanga Māori (Māori customary) process to resolve the dispute regarding his racially charged social media posts. On 16 September, Tamihere defended the substance of Ferris' comments, stating that "it's wrong for other folk to politic in Māori seats." In response, Labour leader Hipkins expressed disagreement with Tamihere and Ferris's views and warned this could affect Labour's relationship with Te Pāti Māori.

Following the passage of the National Government's Marine and Coastal Area (Takutai Moana) (Customary Marine Title) Amendment Act 2025 (MACA) into law on 21 October 2025, Ferris and TPM co-leader Debbie Ngarewa-Packer posted a social media video of themselves burning a copy of the legislation on the grounds of Parliament. The MACA legislation raises the legal threshold for Māori making claims to ancestral titles on foreshore and seabed. In response, Speaker Gerry Brownlee condemned the two MPs' actions and said he was "currently taking advice".

On 3 November 2025, Tamihere called on Ferris and fellow TPM MP Mariameno Kapa-Kingi to resign, accusing the duo of "greed, avarice, and entitlement" and attempting to overthrow the party's co-leaders Waititi and Ngarewa-Packer. Despite attempts at mediation by the National Iwi Chairs Forum, the national council of Te Pāti Māori subsequently voted to expel Ferris and Kapa-Kingi on 9 November. In response, he denounced the decision, stating "I do not acknowledge the decisions and illegal resolutions made through unilateral measures." On 25 November, Ferris alleged that the party's leadership had attempted to unseat the late TPM MP Takutai Tarsh Kemp from her Tāmaki Makaurau electorate seat several months prior to her death in June 2025. Tamihere declined to comment on Ferris' allegation.

=== 2026 election campaign ===
On 21 March 2026, Ferris announced his intention to run for the Te Tai Tonga electorate as an independent in the 2026 election. On 7 November, he came fourth place in the Te Tai Tonga contest with 4,716 votes, based on preliminary results. He was unseated by Labour Party MP Mananui Ramsden.

== Footnotes ==
New Zealand Parliament
Preceded by Rino Tirikatene	Member of Parliament for Te Tai Tonga; 2023–present	Incumbent
