= Whatarangi Winiata =

New Zealand accountant, academic and Māori leader (1934–2206)

- Born: 22 July 1935; Hokio, New Zealand
- Died: 3 June 2026 (aged 90)
- Occupation: Academic
- Known for: Founding Te Wānanga o Raukawa
- Awards: Lifetime Achievement Award, National Māori Language Awards (2018); Te Whare Pūkenga Award, National Iwi Chairs Forum (2022)

Academic background
- Education: University of Michigan
- Thesis: United States managerial investment in Japan, 1950–1964: an interview study (1966)

Academic work
- Institutions: University of British Columbia; Victoria University of Wellington

Whatarangi Winiata (22 July 1935 – 3 June 2026) was a New Zealand accountant, academic and Māori leader. From 1994 to 2007, he was chief executive of Te Wānanga o Raukawa, a Māori tertiary education institution. He had been professor of accountancy at the Victoria University of Wellington from 1974. He was the inaugural president of the Māori Party, serving from 2004 to 2009.

== Early life and career ==
Winiata was born on 22 July 1935 at Hokio in Horowhenua. He was affiliated with the Māori iwi Ngāti Raukawa. He was the second Māori to graduate with a Bachelor of Commerce degree, from Victoria University College in 1957.

He earned MBA and PhD degrees from the University of Michigan. He lived also in Canada working at the University of British Columbia. In about 1975, he and his family returned to New Zealand.

Winiata worked establishing and revitalising te reo Māori for Ngāti Raukawa, having observed that there were no Māori language speakers under the age of 30 in 1975 within the tribe. Winiata was the architect of the 25-year Whakatupuranga Rua Mano (Generation 2000) iwi development programme that led to the establishment of Te Wānanga o Raukawa based in Ōtaki. Ōtaki is a bilingual town, with Māori spoken in 50% of its homes.

Hirini Moko Mead said of Winiata, he is "a leading thinker of the Māori world, and of te ao Pākehā as well".

Winiata was founding president of the Māori Party.

== Personal life and death ==
Winiata married Francie Aratema in 1961 and they had four children. He died on 3 June 2026, at the age of 90.

== Awards ==
- 2018 – Lifetime Achievement Award, National Māori Language Awards
- 2022 – Te Whare Pūkenga Award, National Iwi Chairs Forum for being a 'living taonga'

Party political offices
New title	President of the Māori Party; 2004 to 2009	Succeeded by Pem Bird
