= Hannah Tamaki =

Vision NZ Party candidate in the 2020 and 2023 New Zealand general election

Hannah Tamaki JP
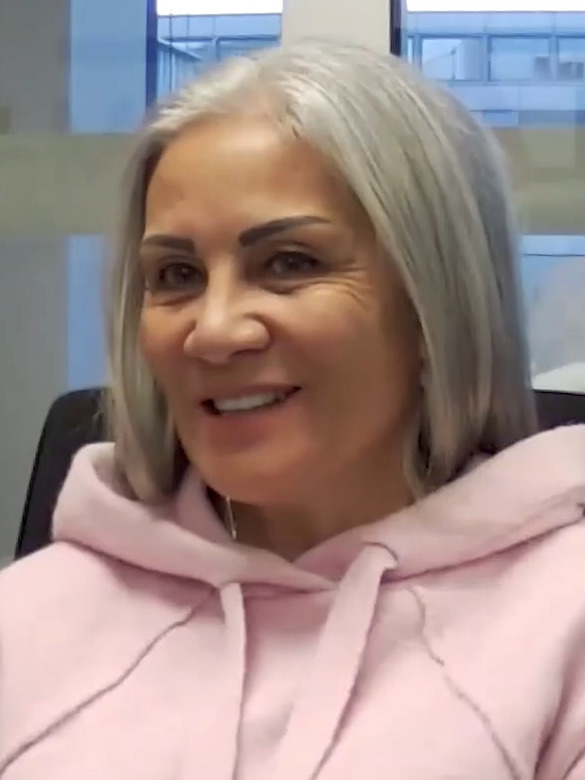
- Tamaki on The Platform in 2022

Leader of Vision NZ
- Incumbent
- Assumed office 23 May 2019
- Deputy: Heker Robertson

Personal details
- Born: Hannah Lee; 1960 (age 65–66) Tokoroa, New Zealand
- Other political affiliations: Freedoms New Zealand
- Spouse: Brian Tamaki (m. 1980)
- Children: 3
- Known for: Wife of Brian Tamaki, the founder of Destiny Church (New Zealand)

Hannah Tamaki JP (née Lee; born 1960) is the wife of Brian Tamaki, the leader of the Pentecostal fundamentalist movement Destiny Church. She is also the leader of the Christian fundamentalist political party Vision NZ.

== Personal life ==
Hannah Lee was born in Tokoroa, New Zealand in 1960 as the daughter of a European father named Basil Lee and a Māori mother named Polly. She has seven half-brothers and half-sisters. Basil worked as the foreman of the Tokoroa cheese factory.

Hannah is the wife of Brian Tamaki, the leader of Destiny Church. The couple have three children and six grandchildren.

== Meeting Brian and religious conversion ==
Hannah attended Tokoroa High School where she played netball, softball and hash harriers. In 1976, she dropped out of school at the age of 15 and found work at the SuperValue supermarket in Tokoroa. She met her future husband Brian Tamaki (who was two years older) and the two developed a romantic relationship. In August 1978, the couple moved to Te Awamutu where Brian became the manager at a dairy farm belonging to one of his relatives. In February 1979, Hannah gave birth to the couple's first child, Jasmine. Hannah bore a second daughter, named Jamie, 14 months later.

In early 1979, Hannah underwent a "born-again" experience after Brian's parents Duke and Margaret Tamaki underwent a born-again experience following a meeting with Pastor Roy Beach, a former motorcycle-gang member turned pastor. The couple subsequently returned to Tokoroa in August 1979, staying with Basil. Hannah resumed her supermarket job while Brian found work tree-felling. Brian subsequently underwent a similar born-again experience in late 1979. The couple married on 22 March 1980.

In January 1982, Hannah and her daughters accompanied her husband Brian to Te Nikau Bible College near Paraparaumu, which was affiliated with Pentecostal and Charismatic movements. During that period, Hannah gave birth to a son named Samuel. Hannah also took two courses at the Bible college, gaining an understanding of Christian theology. After Brian completed his ministerial training at Te Nikau Bible College, Hannah returned to her supermarket job. Brian took up a leadership role at Tokoroa Apostolic Church and became the manager of government employment-scheme.

Hannah accompanied her husband as he pastored Rosetown Community Church in Te Awamutu and Lake City Church in Rotorua during the 1980s and 1990s. While in Te Awamutu, Hannah coached a netball team in order to increase their church's local contacts. In 1994, Brian seceded from the Apostolic Church denomination and founded his own movement, which subsequently became known as Destiny Church.

== Destiny Church ==
In 1998, the Tamakis moved to Auckland and established City Church Auckland, which opened on 4 July. Destiny Church regards this date as its official commencement. Around 2002, Hannah Tamaki founded the Healing Hands Ministry as a small organisation to earn money from the Destiny women's meetings and to support people undergoing treatment, particularly for cancer.

According to the historian Peter Lineham, Hannah served as the "business brains" of Destiny Church, complementing her husband Brian who was primarily a visionary. Hannah also helped to manage her husband's image and to guard the structure and direction of the movement. Hannah played an active role in the leadership of Destiny Church, frequently leading worship and was always portrayed as the partner of her husband in all his ministries. In addition, Tamaki received a salary due to Brian's view that wives should be paid for their ministry if they were working alongside husbands who were employed by the church.

Hannah and Anne Williamson, the wife of Destiny leader Neil Williamson, played an important role in securing funding for the church's bilingual early childhood centre Nga Tamariki Puawai, which opened in 2002. The early childhood centre received a favourable review from the Education Review Office and later had six staff who were trained in the Māori language and general institutions.

== Political involvement ==
=== Destiny New Zealand ===
According to Lineham, Hannah supported Anne Williamson's proposal that Destiny Church start its own political party. Destiny New Zealand was subsequently registered with the Electoral Commission on 1 June 2003. The party contested the 2005 New Zealand general election, gaining only 0.62% of the popular vote (14,210 votes), and winning no seats in the New Zealand House of Representatives. Destiny New Zealand was subsequently deregistered in September 2007.

=== Vision NZ ===
On 23 May 2019, Hannah and her husband Brian announced the launch of a new political party called "Coalition New Zealand." Hannah was confirmed as the leader of the new party, which she described as "a party not just for Christians but for everyone who feels frustrated with the current government." Tamaki identified the legalisation of marijuana, euthanasia and late-term abortion as key motivating factors that spurred her decision to launch a new party. In August 2019, the Electoral Commission initially declined to register the new party on the grounds that its name and logo was likely to mislead voters. In October 2019, the party announced a new name, Vision NZ, and a new logo, and was registered with the Electoral Commission.

During the 2020 New Zealand general election, Vision campaigned on a mixture of socially conservative and Māori oriented policies. The party adopted "hard-right" views on abortion, homosexuality, and immigration. Tamaki opposed the construction of new mosques but backtracked on her initial policies calling for a ban on immigration and refugees. In addition, Tamaki advocated greater financial autonomy for Māori people, including a Māori-owned bank and Tūhoe ownership of Te Urewera. She also called for government funding of Destiny Church's Tu Tangata, Man Up, Legacy and Youth Nation volunteer programmes.

During the 2020 election, Vision New Zealand received 4,236 party votes (or 0.1% of the popular vote) and failed to win any seats in Parliament. Tamaki herself secured 1,171 votes in the Waiariki electorate, coming third place behind the Māori Party's Rawiri Waititi and Labour's Tāmati Coffey. Despite winning no seats, Tamaki claimed after the election that she and Vision had succeeded in defeating Labour's Waiariki candidate Coffey.

On 13 July 2023, Tamaki announced that she would stand as Vision New Zealand's candidate in the Tāmaki Makaurau electorate during the 2023 New Zealand general election. She also confirmed that the party would be contesting all seven Māori electorates as part of her husband Brian's Freedoms New Zealand coalition.

On 11 July 2025, Tamaki confirmed that she would contest the Tāmaki Makaurau seat at the 2025 Tāmaki Makaurau by-election scheduled for 6 September 2025. On 20 August, Tamaki was excluded from a candidate debate at Ngā Whare Waatea Marae in Māngere hosted by Radio Waatea. During the by-election, Tamaki received 146 votes according to preliminary results.

During the 2026 New Zealand general election, Tamaki stood as leader of Vision NZ, ranking first on the party list. She also contested the Papakura electorate. On 7 November, Tamaki came fifth place in the Papakura electorate, with 470 votes based on preliminary results. Vision NZ won 1,529 votes or 0.06% of the party vote based on preliminary results, below the five percent threshold needed to enter Parliament.

=== The Freedoms & Rights Coalition ===
In March 2021, Hannah and Brian attracted media attention after the couple left Auckland while the region was under an Alert Level 2 lockdown and visited Rotorua before traveling to Te Anau in the South Island. The couple's actions were criticised by COVID-19 Response Minister Chris Hipkins, Mayor of Invercargill Tim Shadbolt, and Director-General of Health Ashley Bloomfield. The Mayor of Invercargill Tim Shadbolt stated that the Tamakis were not welcome in the South Island city. In addition, the couple courted controversy when they stated that they would not be vaccinated against COVID-19.

In late October 2021, Tamaki addressed a crowd of 5,000 anti-lockdown protesters who gathered at the Auckland Museum in the Auckland Domain. She claimed that residents of Auckland were being held prisoner and argued that people had the right to choose to be vaccinated. Tamaki spoke in the absence of her husband Brian, who had previously been arrested for leading two anti-lockdown protests in Auckland and was on bail pending trial. Tamaki later led a march outside a police station calling for the release of Brian from his bail conditions. Auckland Police have confirmed they will be prosecuting the organisers for breaching Level 3 restrictions.

In early November 2021, Stuff reported that Hannah and her husband maintained contact with Groundswell NZ's Pukekohe and Auckland coordinator Scott Bright, who donated vegetables to the anti-lockdown "The Freedoms & Rights Coalition" (TFRC) and participated in an anti-lockdown protest organised by the TFRC. Stuff had earlier identified Tamaki's husband Brian as the "founder and architect" behind "The Freedoms & Rights Coalition," which had staged several anti-lockdown protests across New Zealand. In addition, Stuff reported that the TFRC's web domain was owned by Jenny Marshall, the church's director of operations who confirmed Brian's leadership of the TFRC but claimed that the group's donations and merchandising was separate from Destiny Church's finances.

On 20 November, Hannah and Brian attended an anti-lockdown protest organised by the TFRC in the Auckland Domain. At the time, Brian was still subject to bail conditions barring him from participating in further protests. On 23 November, the couple were summoned to the Auckland Central Police station due to their participation in protest on 20 November. In response, 100 supporters gathered outside the Police station in solidarity with the Tamakis. Prior to the meeting, Hannah published a live video thanking supporters including "people of faith" for praying for them. Tamaki was charged with two counts of failing to comply with a COVID-19 order and scheduled to appear in court on 1 April 2022.

On 17 January 2022, Tamaki's husband Brian was arrested and remanded at Mount Eden Correctional Facility for violating his bail conditions by attending the Christchurch protest. A judge subsequently ordered his release on bail, ruling that the decision to remand him in prison had been wrong. As part of his bail conditions, Tamaki was ordered to avoid future anti-lockdown protests and was ordered to remain under a 24-hour curfew at his family home. Hannah welcomed her husband's release, stating that she was a "very happy lady."

On 16 August 2022, Tamaki and Brian were issued with traffic infringement notices for causing traffic disruption during a TFRC protest march held in Auckland on 23 July.

In early November 2024, Tamaki, Brian, Jennifer Marshall, and Kaleb Cave faced trial at the Auckland District Court on charges of organising a series of large public gatherings between September and October 2021 in contravention of Level 3 COVID-19 restrictions at the time. The Tamakis and their co-defendants were defended by Ron Mansfield KC, who argued that they did not intentionally break lockdown rules and that the group were unfairly targeted by Police. In mid-November, Judge June Jelas agreed to dismiss all charges against Tamaki. On 20 November, Jelas, with the approval of the Crown prosecutor, dismissed the remaining charges against her husband Brian and Marshall.

=== Freedoms New Zealand ===
On 23 August 2022 Tamaki and her husband attended an anti-government protest outside the New Zealand Parliament, where Brian launched a new umbrella party called Freedoms New Zealand. This coalition included Tamaki's Vision New Zealand, the New Nation Party, Vision New Zealand, and the NZ Outdoors & Freedom Party.

On 28 September 2023, Hannah and her husband Brian led a TFRC protest against a scheduled "Agenda 2030" conference at the New Zealand Parliament in Wellington. They along with Outdoors Party leader Sue Grey addressed the protesters. Members of the Pōneke Anti-Fascist Coalition staged a counter-protest outside Parliament. The Coalition's march coincided with similar protest activities in Wellington organised by Julian Batchelor's Stop Co-Governance movement, the farming advocacy group Groundswell NZ, and a gang hīkoi protesting against the National and ACT parties' anti-gang policies.

During the 2023 New Zealand general election, Tamaki unsuccessfully contested the Tāmaki Makaurau electorate, coming fifth place with 829 votes. Freedoms NZ failed to enter Parliament, gaining 0.33% of the popular vote (9,586 votes). Following the release of preliminary results, Tamaki praised incoming Prime Minister Christopher Luxon as a "family man" while criticising the incumbent Prime Minister Chris Hipkins' relationship with Toni.

Freedom NZ was subsequently deregistered on 2 May 2025.

== Community involvement ==
=== Māori Women's Welfare League presidential candidacy ===
In May 2011, Hannah Tamaki campaigned for the presidency of the Māori Women's Welfare League, citing the past involvement of her own mother Polly and other relatives in the League. Since Tamaki joined the League five years previously, Destiny Church created thirteen branches of the League within the church in order to boost her chances of being elected as president, recruiting 1,100 members. Former League president Christine Panapa objected to Tamaki's candidacy, stating that the League was a non-sectarian organisation and alleging that Destiny Church was a sect. Similar sentiments were echoed by former League president Denise Ewe, who claimed that Hannah's support was only coming from "Destiny-grown branches."

Destiny Church exploited the League's constitutional rule that branches were entitled to a maximum of 10 votes at national meetings; with the maximum number going to a branch with 90 members. Since the Destiny branches had over 90 members each, this maximised the value of these new branches. However, the League's executive deemed the Destiny-affiliated branches as unconstitutional since they were formed on a sectarian bases and declined to send voting papers to them. The League also distributed voting papers without Tamaki's name and suspended links with those branches and church members pending an inquiry. In July 2011, Tamaki challenged the League's actions at the High Court.

Justice Stephen Kos ordered that Tamaki's name be reinstated on the ballot but ordered that ten of the Destiny–affiliated branches established after 2 May be excluded from the election on the grounds that they had been established contrary to the practices and tikanga of the League. Hannah welcomed the Court's decision reinstating her on the League's ballot and allowing three of the Destiny-affiliated branches to participate in the leadership election.

Tamaki was unsuccessful during the 2011 leadership election, with Kataraina O'Brien being elected as the League's president. The League subsequently revised its policies allowing its National Executive the power to vet presidential and vice-presidential nominations as well as membership applicants. In June 2012, the League's National Executive banned Tamaki from holding any regional office for three years and disestablished the three remaining League branches affiliated with her and Destiny Church. In response, Tamaki announced she would not appeal the ban but would consider establishing a rival organisation.

=== Justice of the Peace ===
In December 2019, the Labour Party-led New Zealand Government, appointed Tamaki as a Justice of the Peace. The-then National Party leader and Leader of the Opposition Simon Bridges described the Government's decision as "bizzare".

=== Dancing with the Stars, 2020 ===
On 23 February 2020, The New Zealand Herald reported that Hannah Tamaki was tipped to join the dancing television show Dancing with the Stars. After a major backlash online, MediaWorks New Zealand confirmed that Tamaki would no longer be joining the series.
