= 2025 Tāmaki Makaurau by-election =

New Zealand by-election

- 6 September 2025

Tāmaki Makaurau Māori constituency of the House of Representatives
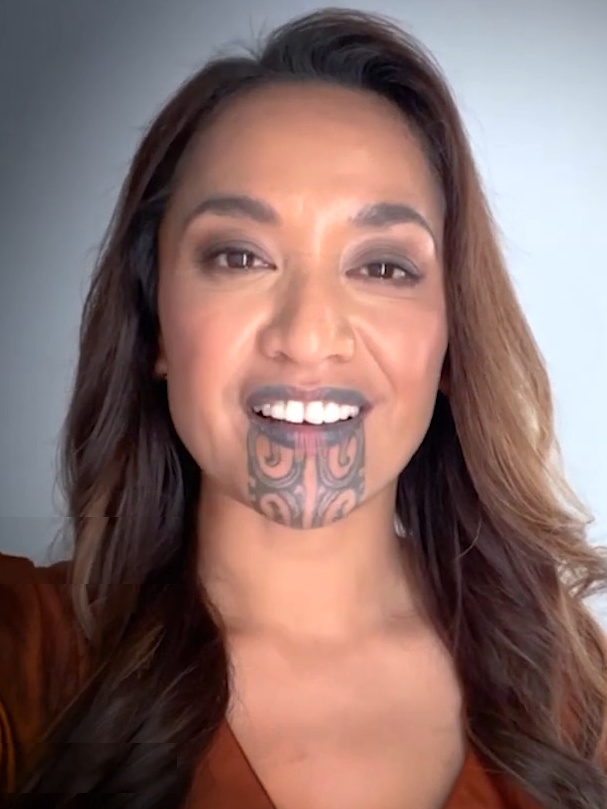

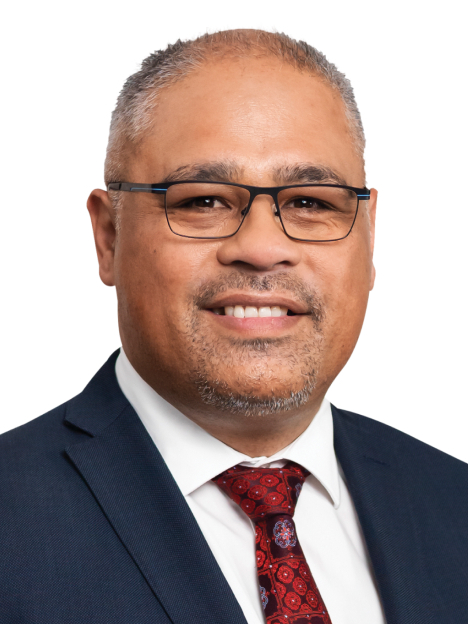
	First party	Second party
Candidate	Oriini Kaipara	Peeni Henare
Party	Te Pāti Māori	Labour
Popular vote	6,948	3,429
Percentage	65.01%	32.08%
- Kaipara: 50–60% 60–70% 70–80% ≥90% Henare: 50–60% Tie: 40–50% No polling places
MP before election
Takutai Tarsh Kemp†
Te Pāti Māori
Elected MP
Oriini Kaipara
Te Pāti Māori

A by-election was held in the Tāmaki Makaurau electorate on 6 September 2025. The by-election was triggered by the death of Takutai Tarsh Kemp, an MP for Te Pāti Māori.

Broadcaster Oriini Kaipara held the seat for Te Pāti Māori, defeating Labour MP Peeni Henare, who previously held it between 2014 and 2023.

== Background ==
=== Constituency ===
The electorate covers central and southern Auckland. At the 2023 election, Takutai Tarsh Kemp of Te Pāti Māori defeated the incumbent Labour MP Peeni Henare by a margin of just 42 votes.

=== Trigger ===
The by-election was triggered by the unexpected death of the sitting MP, Kemp, on 26 June 2025.

The process for calling a by-election when an MP dies is that once the Registrar of Births, Deaths and Marriages receives the registration of death for a sitting MP, they must inform the speaker of the House of Representatives within 12 hours. The speaker of the House must then publish, without delay, the notice of vacancy of the seat in the New Zealand Gazette. The notice was published in the Gazette on 9 July 2025.

The governor-general must issue the writ for a by-election to fill a vacant electorate seat within 21 days of the Gazette notice (i.e. 30 July 2025). Because polling day must be a Saturday and two weeks are generally required for the counting of special votes, the last possible polling day was Saturday, 13 September 2025.

On 14 July, the prime minister, Christopher Luxon, announced that the by-election would be held on Saturday, 6 September. The writ must be returned with the successful candidate within 60 days of its issue, which meant the writ had to be returned by 28 September 2025.

== Candidates ==
In early July, former journalist Oriini Kaipara announced her intention to seek the nomination to be Te Pāti Māori's candidate for the by-election. Youth worker Te Kou o Rehua Panapa also declared intention to seek the Te Pāti Māori nomination, while Eru Kapa-Kingi, a list candidate in 2023, ruled himself out. Party members of Te Pāti Māori voted for their candidate, with the selection taking place on 10 July and the successful candidate formally announced the next day. Kaipara was confirmed as the nominee on 10 July.

Previous Tāmaki Makaurau MP, Peeni Henare, told reporters on 26 June that he had not yet thought about whether he would stand in the by-election, saying "that's not where my mind is". On 13 July, Labour confirmed Henare as their candidate.

National, ACT, New Zealand First and the Greens all announced they would not run candidates. Vision NZ leader Hannah Tamaki contested the seat again, having received 829 votes in 2023.

List of candidates
Party	Photo	Candidate	Background
NZ Loyal		Kelvyn Alp	
Labour		Peeni Henare	List MP and former MP for Tāmaki Makaurau.
Te Pāti Māori		Oriini Kaipara	Broadcaster and journalist, first person to present a prime-time news programme with a moko kauae facial tattoo.
Independent		Sherry Lee Matene	
Vision NZ		Hannah Tamaki	Leader of Vision NZ and wife of controversial Pentecostal preacher Brian Tamaki (leader of Destiny Church).

== Campaign ==
A candidate debate was held at Ngā Whare Waatea Marae in Māngere on 20 August hosted by Radio Waatea. Henare and Kaipara were the only candidates invited to participate. Karl Mokaraka, a former Vision NZ candidate, disrupted the event by protesting the exclusion of Vision NZ’s candidate, Hannah Tamaki. Mokaraka was escorted out amid audience heckles as Kaipara led a waiata to calm the crowd. The remaining debate proceeded cordially with candidates discussing issues like housing, the cost of living, education, Māori issues and foreign affairs. During that same debate, both Henare and Kaipara voiced support for repealing the Gangs Act 2024's ban on gang patches. Henare's remarks contradicted the Labour Party's official position of not repealing the gang patch ban; with both Labour leader Chris Hipkins and deputy leader Carmel Sepuloni issuing statements that Henare's remarks did not represent official Labour policy. Te Pāti Māori co-leader Debbie Ngarewa-Packer said that her party spoke for Māori while Labour represented mainstream policy. National Party MP and Justice Minister Paul Goldsmith questioned Labour's commitment to not repealing the gang patch ban.

On 4 September 2025, Te Pāti Māori MP Tākuta Ferris published a controversial social media post criticising the ethnicity of several Labour Party campaign volunteers during the 2025 Tāmaki Makaurau by-election, accusing them of trying to steal a Māori seat. In response, Te Pāti Māori disavowed Ferris' post, issued an apology and ordered him to remove it. Labour MP Willie Jackson condemned Ferris' social media remarks as offensive and reiterated his party's commitment to representing all ethnic communities.

== Results ==
Oriini Kaipara won the election with 6,948 votes – a margin of 3,519 votes over Peeni Henare, who received 3,429 votes. Hannah Tamaki received 175 votes, Sherry-Lee Matene received 41, and Kelvyn Alp received 26. Henare conceded defeat on the night of the by-election while Kaipara gave an acceptance speech and song to her supporters.

Turnout was low, with only around 27.1% of the 44,269 people enrolled to vote in the Tāmaki Makaurau electorate taking part. The following table shows the final results of the by-election:

2025 Tāmaki Makaurau by-election
Notes: Blue background denotes the winner of the by-election. Pink background denotes a candidate elected from their party list prior to the by-election. Yellow background denotes the winner of the by-election, who was a list MP prior to the by-election. A ✓ or ✗ denotes status of any incumbent, win or lose respectively.
Party	Candidate	Votes	%	±%
Te Pāti Māori	Oriini Kaipara	6,948	65.01	
Labour	Peeni Henare	3,429	32.08	
Vision NZ	Hannah Tamaki	175	1.64	
Independent	Sherry Lee Matene	41	0.38	
NZ Loyal	Kelvyn Alp	26	0.24	
Informal votes		69	0.65	
Total Valid votes		10,619	99.35	
Turnout		10,688		
Te Pāti Māori hold	Majority	3,519	32.93	

== Post-election events ==
On 6 September 2025, the Electoral Commission confirmed it would investigate a social media post released on the last polling day by Te Pāti Māori MP Tākuta Ferris that urged people to vote for his party. The Commission also confirmed they were investigating two billboards and a gazebo left standing by the party.
