= Oriini Kaipara =

New Zealand Māori politician & broadcaster

Oriini Kaipara MP
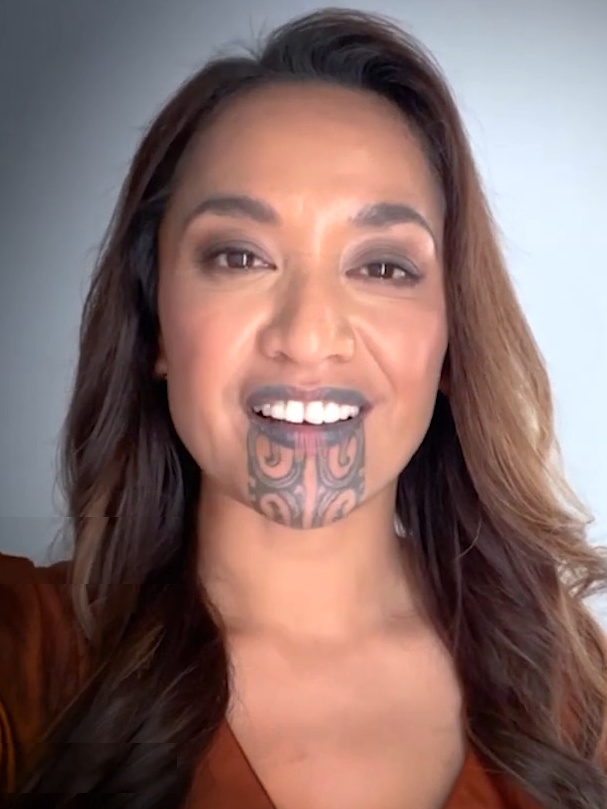
- Kaipara in 2022

Member of the New Zealand Parliament for Tāmaki Makaurau
- Incumbent
- Assumed office 6 September 2025
- Preceded by: Takutai Tarsh Kemp

Personal details
- Born: 1983 (age 42–43) Whakatāne, New Zealand
- Party: Te Pāti Māori
- Children: 4
- Occupation: Broadcaster; journalist

Oriini Ngawai Kaipara (born 1983) is a New Zealand politician, broadcaster, journalist and translator and interpreter of Māori and English. She has served as a Member of Parliament since winning the Tāmaki Makaurau by-election for Te Pāti Māori in September 2025.

Kaipara previously worked for Mai FM, TVNZ 1, Māori Television, and Three. In 2019, she became the first person with a moko kauae facial tattoo to present mainstream television news, and two years later was the first such person to host a prime-time news programme on national television.

== Early life ==
Kaipara was born in Whakatāne in 1983. Her iwi are Tūhoe, Ngāti Awa, Tūwharetoa and Ngāti Rangitihi. She attended a kura kaupapa Māori, and trained at South Seas Film and Television School in 2002.

== Media career ==
Kaipara was a newsreader at Mai FM, and then in 2004 joined TVNZ's fully te reo Māori Waka Huia as a reporter and director.

In 2017, the Māori Television programme Native Affairs, which she presented, revealed she has essentially 100 percent Māori DNA, despite having some Pākehā ancestry. Kaipara described herself as a "full-blooded Māori".

She received her moko kauae facial tattoo in January 2019 while she was a journalist for TVNZ's Te Karere. In November 2019 she was the first person with a moko kauae to present mainstream television news on TVNZ's 1News.

In May 2021 she moved to Three and began presenting news on the programme Newshub Live at 4.30 pm.

In February 2022 Kaipara joined Simon Shepherd as co-host of Three's weekly political current affairs show Newshub Nation. As host, she was valued for her conversational fluency in both Māori and English, her approach to political issues that are important to Māori, and her commitment to the renewal of both te reo Māori and tikanga Māori.

In 2022, Kaipara acted the parts of Te Akiu in the film We Are Still Here, and Hine in Muru. She has also presented news on AM, guest hosted The Project and hosted Cyberworld.

Kaipara announced in December 2023 that she would be leaving TV3 to become Māori cultural lead for the New Zealand Olympic Committee.

== Political career ==
New Zealand Parliament
Years	Term	Electorate	List	Party
2025–2026	54th	Tāmaki Makaurau		Te Pāti Māori
2026–present	55th	Tāmaki Makaurau		Te Pāti Māori

=== First term, 2025–2026 ===
In July 2025 Kaipara was selected to be Te Pāti Māori's candidate for the 2025 Tāmaki Makaurau by-election. During a candidate debate held in mid-August 2025, she and Labour candidate Peeni Henare voiced support for repealing the Gangs Act 2024's ban on gang patches. Kaipara won the 6 September election with a 2,938 vote margin on the preliminary count. Following Henare's concession, Kaipara sang and gave an acceptance speech to her supporters.

On 9 October 2025, Kaipara gave her maiden speech in the New Zealand Parliament, which exceeded the 15 minute time limit. During her speech, she said that she stood in the New Zealand House of Representatives as "product of Māori resilience" rather than a "survivor of colonisation." Kaipara also talked about the fight for the Māori language and rights. Following her speech, a member of the public in the public gallery gave an impromptu waiata and haka in honour of Kaipara. In response, Speaker Gerry Brownlee halted proceedings and cleared the House, condemning the actions as "contemptous" and saying he would investigate any parties involved in the haka. On 14 October, Brownlee ruled that Kaipara had disrespected the Parliamentary process by exceeding her 15-minute speech limit since she had been granted an earlier slot for Te Pāti Māori's leadership to announce the party's reset.

In late October 2025, Kaipara expressed support for embattled colleague MP Mariameno Kapa-Kingi amidst internal party proceedings to suspend her.

=== 2026 general election ===
In mid-May 2026, Kaipara confirmed that she would be standing as a Te Pāti Māori candidate for the 2026 New Zealand general election, dispelling a Stuff report citing a communications staffer that she was considering "options." During the 2026 election, she contested the Tāmaki Makaurau electorate. Her party also opted to stand seven candidates within the Māori electorates, telling their supporters to give their party votes to the Labour and Green parties.

During the 2026 general election held on 7 November, Kaipara held Tāmaki Makaurau for Te Pāti Māori and won 13,505 votes based on preliminary results; with the former Labour candidate Kerrin Leoni trailing by a margin of 7,498.

== Recognition ==
In 2008, Kaipara won the best female television presenter award at the Māori Media Awards. In 2018, Kaipara won the Voyager award for Best Māori Affairs Reporter for her work on Native Affairs for Māori Television.

In 2021 Kaipara received international recognition for being the first person to host a prime-time news programme on national television with traditional facial markings.

== Personal life ==
Kaipara lives in West Auckland and has four children.

In 2020 Kaipara was upset by a portrait painted of her without permission by Auckland artist Samantha Payne, in which her unique moko kauae was prominently displayed. Moko kauae are considered sacred and commercialisation of them is considered immoral by many Māori. After talking with Kaipara, the artist apologised and removed the portrait from public sale. There was another unauthorised painting made of Kaipara in 2024, with a very similar portrait being sold by a South African-born artist that emphasised her moko kauae. The artist netted $1,200 for the work and refused to apologise or speak to the media. Kaipara described the incident as “profiting off her whakapapa”, and encouraged the artist to donate his earnings to a kōhanga reo.

== See also ==
- List of New Zealand politicians
- List of New Zealand television personalities

New Zealand Parliament
Preceded by Takutai Tarsh Kemp	Member of Parliament for Tāmaki Makaurau; 2025–present	Incumbent
