= Whānau Ora =

Indigenous health initiative in New Zealand

Whānau Ora (Māori for "healthy families") is a major contemporary indigenous health initiative in New Zealand, driven by Māori cultural values. Its core goal is to empower communities and extended families (whānau) to support families within the community context rather than individuals within an institutional context.

== History and objectives ==
Whānau Ora evolved out of the coalition between the National and Māori parties after the 2008 general election and became a cornerstone of the coalition agreement between them after the 2011 general election. Te Puni Kōkiri (the Ministry for Māori Development) stated in 2011 that:

Whānau Ora is an inclusive approach to providing services and opportunities to whānau across New Zealand. It empowers whānau as a whole, rather than focusing separately on individual whānau members and their problems.

Prior to the health initiative, Whānau Ora was the name of the Māori health awards.

In 2014, three commissioning agencies were established to work with community services to provide Māori-led social services, health and education. These were the Whānau Ora Commissioning Agency in the North Island, Te Pūtahitanga o Te Waipounamu in the South Island, and Pasifika Futures (which provided services to Pasifika New Zealanders).

In early March 2025, the Whānau Ora Commissioning Agency, Te Pūtahitanga o Te Waipounamu, and Pasifika Future lost their contracts after Te Puni Kokiri decided to open the tender process to other competitors. They will be replaced by four new agencies including two in the North Island, one in the South Island, and one serving the Pasifika community. Ngāti Toa gained one of the North Island contracts while Ngāi Tahu gained the South Island contract. The New Zealand Herald reported that the loss of these contracts would affect 1,000 jobs including about 600 jobs at the Whānau Ora Commissioning Agency. Te Puni Kokiri secretary for Māori development Dave Samuels defended the Ministry's decision to tender the Whānau Ora contracts, adding that it reflected a greater focus on data-driven outcomes and more frontline services. Whānau Ora Commissioning Agency chair Merepeka Raukawa-Tait and Te Pāti Māori leader Debbie Ngarewa-Packer criticised the decision as devastating to jobs and Māori trust.

== Controversies ==
The programme has been criticised for having hard to define and impossible to measure specific outputs; as well as a disproportionate amount of funding being spent in Turia's electorate. MP Winston Peters has been a vocal opponent of the program. The longest-established national Māori health organisation, the Māori Women's Welfare League choose not to participate in Whānau Ora, but some regional leaders are involved. The League operates a parenting skills course called Whanau Toko i te Ora, which is unrelated to Whānau Ora.

In late June 2025, Te Puni Kōkiri (the Ministry for Māori Development) launched an independent review into allegations that two providers, Te Pou Matakana Limited (the Whānau Ora Commissioning Agency) and Pasifika Futures Limited, had misused public funding meant for Whānau Ora purposes. Te Pou Matakana had funded an advertisement campaign encouraging Māori to register with the Māori electoral roll while Pasifika Futures had allocated Whānau Ora funding to the Super Rugby franchise Moana Pasifika. Both agency's Whānau Ora contracts are expected to end on 30 June 2025. The Pacific Medical Association (PMA), of which Moana Pasifika is an affiliate member, disputed allegations that Moana Pasifika had received $70,000 a year from a Whānau Ora contract with the PMA.

== Minister ==
A ministerial portfolio, the Minister for Whānau Ora, was established in 2010.

Colour key (for political parties)
Labour	National	Māori Party

No.	Name	Portrait	Term of office		Prime Minister
1	Tariana Turia		8 April 2010	8 October 2014	Key
2	Te Ururoa Flavell		8 October 2014	21 October 2017	Key
2	Te Ururoa Flavell		8 October 2014	21 October 2017	English
3	Peeni Henare		26 October 2017	27 November 2023	Ardern
3	Peeni Henare		26 October 2017	27 November 2023	Hipkins
4	Tama Potaka		27 November 2023	present	Luxon
