= Peeni Henare =

New Zealand politician

The Honourable Peeni Henare
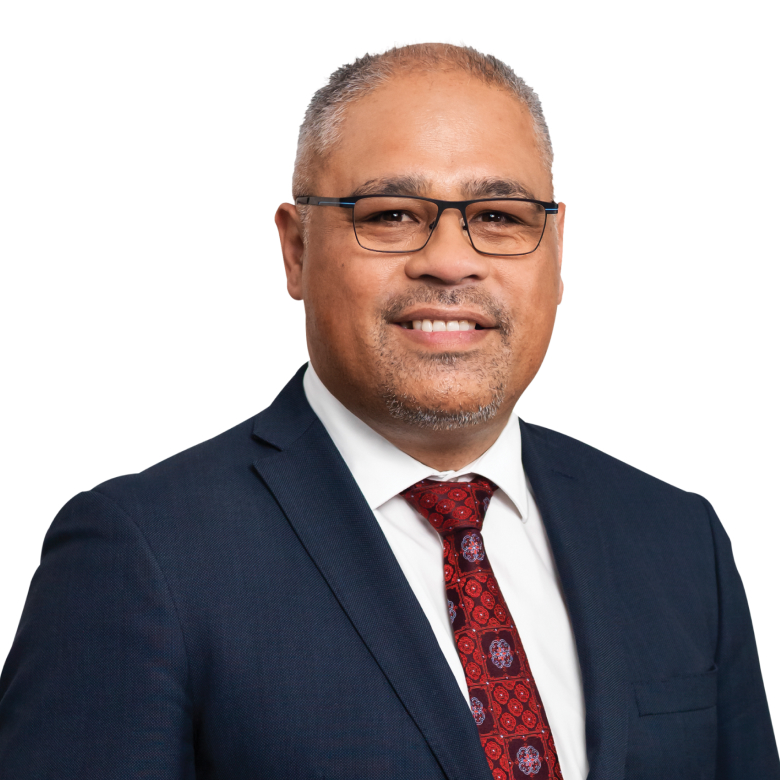
- Henare in 2023

41st Minister of Defence
- In office 6 November 2020 – 1 February 2023
- Prime Minister: Jacinda Ardern; Chris Hipkins
- Preceded by: Ron Mark
- Succeeded by: Andrew Little

38th Minister of Tourism
- In office 1 February 2023 – 27 November 2023
- Prime Minister: Chris Hipkins
- Preceded by: Stuart Nash
- Succeeded by: Matt Doocey

32nd Minister of Forestry
- In office 12 April 2023 – 27 November 2023
- Prime Minister: Chris Hipkins
- Preceded by: Megan Woods (acting)
- Succeeded by: Todd McClay

14th Minister for Youth
- In office 26 October 2017 – 6 November 2020
- Prime Minister: Jacinda Ardern
- Preceded by: Nikki Kaye
- Succeeded by: Priyanca Radhakrishnan

16th Minister for ACC
- In office 1 February 2023 – 27 November 2023
- Prime Minister: Chris Hipkins
- Preceded by: Carmel Sepuloni
- Succeeded by: Matt Doocey

3rd Minister for Whānau Ora
- In office 26 October 2017 – 27 November 2023
- Prime Minister: Jacinda Ardern; Chris Hipkins
- Preceded by: Te Ururoa Flavell
- Succeeded by: Tama Potaka

26th Minister of Civil Defence
- In office 27 June 2019 – 6 November 2020
- Prime Minister: Jacinda Ardern
- Preceded by: Kris Faafoi
- Succeeded by: Kiri Allan

8th Minister for the Community and Voluntary Sector
- In office 26 October 2017 – 3 July 2019
- Prime Minister: Jacinda Ardern
- Preceded by: Alfred Ngaro
- Succeeded by: Poto Williams

Member of Parliament for Labour Party list
- In office 14 October 2023 – 15 March 2026
- Succeeded by: Dan Rosewarne (Note: Normally, list MPs do not have individual predecessors or successors, but Henare resigned during a sitting parliament and therefore was succeeded by Rosewarne.)

Member of the New Zealand Parliament for Tāmaki Makaurau
- In office 20 September 2014 – 14 October 2023
- Preceded by: Pita Sharples
- Succeeded by: Takutai Tarsh Kemp
- Majority: 927

Personal details
- Relations: James Hēnare (grandfather); Taurekareka (Tau) Hēnare (great-grandfather); Dun Mihaka (uncle); Tau Henare (second cousin)
- Website: www.labour.org.nz/peenihenare

Peeni Ereatara Gladwyn Henare ([ˈpɛːni ˈhɛnaˌɾɛ]) is a New Zealand politician. He was a Labour Party member of parliament from the 2014 general election until 2026. He first held the Tāmaki Makaurau Māori electorate until being defeated by Te Pāti Māori's Takutai Tarsh Kemp in the 2023 general election, and then continued as a list MP until resigning from parliament in March 2026.

== Family ==
Henare is a great-grandson of Taurekareka Hēnare, who held the Northern Maori seat between 1914 and 1938. His grandfather was James Hēnare, who had stood for the National Party in five elections between 1946 and 1963. His father was Erima Henare, who was head of the Māori Language Commission, and his mother is Te Hemo Ata Henare, a master weaver. Henare's second cousin, Tau Henare (also a direct descendant of Taurekareka Hēnare) was a New Zealand Member of Parliament from 1993 to 1999 and from 2005 to 2014.

Henare's uncle was the Māori activist Dun Mihaka, and he has relations to both Shane Jones and Winston Peters.

== Political career ==
=== In Opposition, 2014–2017 ===
New Zealand Parliament
Years	Term	Electorate	List	Party
2014–2017	51st	Tāmaki Makaurau	none	Labour
2017–2020	52nd	Tāmaki Makaurau	none	Labour
2020–2023	53rd	Tāmaki Makaurau	18	Labour
2023–2026	54th	List	14	Labour

Peeni Henare won the Tāmaki Makaurau electorate ahead of Rangi McLean of the Māori Party in 2014. In 2016, a member's bill submitted by Henare which aimed to ban the import of goods produced by slave labour was drawn from the ballot. The bill had been first introduced by Maryan Street and defeated at its first reading in 2009. It was again defeated at its first reading in 2016 due to opposition from the National Party and Act New Zealand.

=== In Government, 2017–2023 ===
During the 2017 New Zealand general election, Henare was re-elected in the Tāmaki Makaurau electorate, winning 9,396 votes. Henare was elected as a Minister outside Cabinet by the Labour Party caucus following Labour's formation of a coalition government with New Zealand First and the Greens in October 2017. He assumed the portfolio of Minister for Whānau Ora, which falls under the purview of Te Puni Kōkiri (the Ministry for Māori Development).

Following a cabinet reshuffle in late June 2019, Henare was appointed as Minister of Civil Defence.

During the 2020 general election, Henare retained Tāmaki Makaurau, defeating the Māori Party candidate and co-leader John Tamihere and Green co-leader Marama Davidson. When the official results were released, Henare had a majority of 956, but after the Māori Party requested a recount in Tāmaki Makaurau, Henare's majority fell slightly to 927. In November 2020, Henare was announced as Minister of Defence and Minister for Whānau Ora. He also assumed the health, housing and tourism associate portfolios with responsibility for Māori health and housing.

In May 2022 he indicated to Labour Party President Claire Szabó that he would possibly be unwilling to recontest Tāmaki Makaurau at the 2023 New Zealand general election, preferring instead to contest the election as a list-only candidate.

In November 2022, Henare in his capacity as Defence Minister visited Polish Minister of National Defence Mariusz Błaszczak. He subsequently visited Ukrainian Defence Minister Oleksii Reznikov and paid tribute to the fallen at The Wall of Remembrance of the Fallen for Ukraine in Kyiv. Henare's visit to Ukraine marked the first visit by a New Zealand cabinet minister since the 2022 Russian invasion of Ukraine.

During a cabinet shuffle that occurred on 31 January 2023, Henare was succeeded as Defence Minister by Andrew Little. Henare became the Minister for the Accident Compensation Corporation (ACC), Minister of Tourism, and Minister for the Environment while retaining the Associate Minister of Health portfolio with responsibility for Māori.

=== In Opposition, 2023–2026 ===
During the 2023 New Zealand general election held on 14 October, Henare lost Tāmaki Makaurau by a narrow margin of 42 votes to Te Pāti Māori (Māori Party) candidate Takutai Tarsh Kemp. He was re-elected to Parliament on the party list. In early November 2023, Henare applied for a judicial recount. On 15 November, the Electoral Commission found that Kemp has won by a margin of 42 votes.

Following the formation of the National-led coalition government in late November 2023, Henare became spokesperson for defence, sport and recreation, and associate health in the Shadow Cabinet of Chris Hipkins.

On 5 December 2023, Henare was granted retention of the title The Honourable, in recognition of his term as a member of the Executive Council.

In February 2024, Henare attracted media attention after he used a metaphor involving a gun during a Māori language speech prior to Waitangi Day. Criticising the Government's policies towards Māori, he stated: "This is a fight that will not be fought just in Parliament. I lift my gun, and I let the shots do the talking." Henare subsequently clarified that he was referring to a "figurative gun" rather than an actual gun. ACT leader David Seymour described Henare's metaphor of shooting people as inappropriate. Henare was defended by Labour Party leader Chris Hipkins, who argued that Henare was using a metaphor and not making an actual death threat. Hipkins also responded that Seymour was not in a position to "throw stones" given his 2023 remarks about blowing up the Ministry for Pacific Peoples.

On 10 December 2024, House Speaker Gerry Brownlee referred Henare along with Te Pāti Māori (TPM) MPs Hana-Rawhiti Maipi-Clarke, Rawiri Waititi and Debbie Ngarewa-Packer to the Privileges Committee for leading a haka (Ka Mate) that interrupted vote proceedings during the first reading of the Treaty Principles Bill on 14 November 2024. On 13 March 2025, Henare appeared before the Privileges Committee where he apologised for getting out of his seat but refused to apologise for participating in the haka. On 26 March, the Committee found that Henare had acted in a "disorderly" way in joining the TPM-led haka but ruled that his actions did not amount to "contempt."

Following a cabinet reshuffle on 7 March 2025, Henare became part of Hipkins' new economic team, gaining the economic development and associate health portfolios. He retained the Māori-Crown Relations Te Arawhiti and defence portfolios but lost the sports and recreation portfolio.

In July 2025, Henare was confirmed as Labour's candidate for that year's by-election in the Tāmaki Makaurau electorate, which had been called following the death of Takutai Tarsh Kemp. During a candidate debate with Te Pāti Māori candidate Oriini Kaipara held on 20 August 2025, Henare voiced support for repealing the National-led coalition government's Gangs Act 2024's ban on gang patches. Henare's remarks contradicted Labour leader Hipkins' position that the party would not repeal the ban on gang patches. In response, Labour's deputy leader Carmel Sepuloni clarified that Henare's remarks did not represent official party policy. In response, National Party MP and Justice Minister Paul Goldsmith questioned whether Labour would commit to its promise not to repeal the gang patch ban.

On 6 September, Henare lost the Tāmaki Makaurau by-election to Kaipara by a landslide. Based on the preliminary count, Henare won 3,093 votes, coming second place to Kaipara's 6,031 votes. During his concession speech, Henare described the National-led coalition government as their main opposition.

On 3 February 2026, Henare announced he had not put himself forward to be nominated as the Labour Party candidate for his former Tāmaki Makaurau seat, and that he would shortly resign from Parliament would not seek a place on the Labour Party list in the 2026 general election. During his valedictory speech to Parliament on 11 March, Henare urged his parliamentary colleagues to move away from "gotcha style politics" in order to rebuild trust in political institutions. Henare's resignation as an MP took effect at 11:59 pm on 15 March.

== Post-parliamentary career ==
In July 2026 Henare was announced as New Zealand Rugby's new Kaihautū Māori to provide strategic leadership on Māori engagement and help ensure te ao Māori is reflected throughout the rugby system.

== Personal life ==
Henare's partner is Skye Kimura, who served as the chief executive of the consultancy group Tātou until early 2023.

In mid August 2023, the National Party's public service spokesperson Simeon Brown called for the Public Service Commission to investigate the awarding of $600,000 worth of government contracts to Tātou in 2021 and 2022, including $250,000 from the Ministry of Health. In 2018, Henare had disclosed Kimura's business interests to the Cabinet Office and agreed not to be involved in any decisions regarding contracts with her agency. While the Health Ministry confirmed that Tātou had followed the rules and that Henare was involved, it acknowledged that the group had not declared a conflict of interest or instituted an internal management plan. In mid September 2023, the Health Ministry commissioned an independent review of all contracts it had awarded to Tātou. Public Service Commissioner Peter Hughes sought a copy of the findings but declined the National Party's request for a broader review of all government contracts awarded to Tātou. In February 2024, PwC released its review, which concluded that the Health Ministry had failed to raise any concerns about conflicts of interest around the seven contracts it had awarded to Tātou between 2021 and 2022. Following the report, the Ministry undertook action to educate its staff about dealing with conflicts of interests.

== Notes ==
New Zealand Parliament
Preceded by Pita Sharples	Member of Parliament for Tāmaki Makaurau; 2014–2023	Succeeded by Takutai Tarsh Kemp
Political offices
Preceded by Te Ururoa Flavell	Minister for Whānau Ora; 2017–2023	Succeeded by Tama Potaka
Preceded by Alfred Ngaro	Minister for the Community and Voluntary Sector; 2017–2019	Succeeded by Poto Williams
Preceded by Nikki Kaye	Minister for Youth; 2017–2020	Succeeded by Priyanca Radhakrishnan
Preceded by Kris Faafoi	Minister of Civil Defence; 2019–2020	Succeeded by Kiri Allan as Minister for Emergency Management
Preceded by Ron Mark	Minister of Defence; 2020–2023	Succeeded by Andrew Little
Preceded by Carmel Sepuloni	Minister for ACC; 2023	Succeeded by Matt Doocey
Preceded by Stuart Nash	Minister of Tourism; 2023	Succeeded by Matt Doocey
Preceded by Stuart Nash	Minister of Forestry; 2023	Succeeded by Todd McClay
