= Takutai Tarsh Kemp =

New Zealand politician (1975–2025)

Takutai Tarsh Kemp ONZM
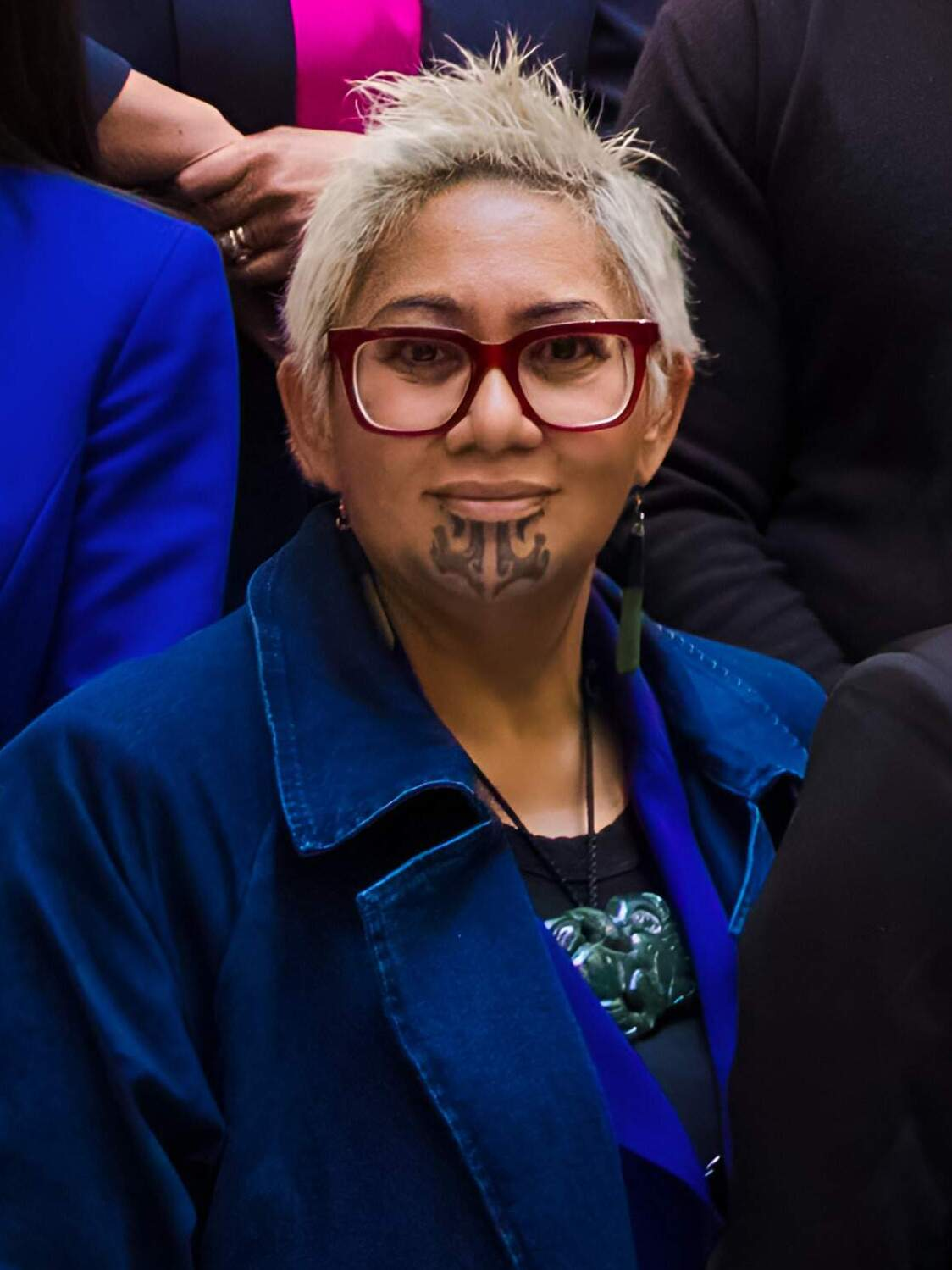
- Kemp in 2023

Member of the New Zealand Parliament for Tāmaki Makaurau
- In office 14 October 2023 – 26 June 2025
- Preceded by: Peeni Henare
- Succeeded by: Oriini Kaipara
- Majority: 42

Personal details
- Born: 20 June 1975
- Died: 26 June 2025 (aged 50) Auckland, New Zealand
- Party: Te Pāti Māori

Takutai Moana Natasha Kemp ONZM (20 June 1975 – 26 June 2025) was a New Zealand politician, community health leader and hip hop dance director. She won the Tāmaki Makaurau electorate in the 2023 New Zealand general election and was a member of the New Zealand House of Representatives for Te Pāti Māori until her death.

== Early life and family ==
Kemp was born on 20 June 1975. She came from the iwi (tribes) of Ngā Rauru, Ngāti Tuwharetoa, Ngā iwi o Mōkai Pātea, Ngāti Tamakōpiri, Ngāti Whitikaupeka, Ngāi Te Ohuake, Ngāti Hauiti, Ngāti Hinemanu, and Ngāti Paki. She was the eldest child of Clark Karaka Kauika-Stevens and Ngaire Anne Te Hirata Kauika-Stevens (née Steedman). She was raised by her paternal grandparents at the Takirau marae in South Taranaki between the ages of seven and eleven. She was raised by her maternal grandfather from age 7 when she came back from Singapore where her father was stationed for the Corps of Royal New Zealand Engineers. She returned to her parents at age 11. After that, she lived in Palmerston North and Auckland. At the University of Auckland, she studied anthropology, health, education, and mātauranga Māori.

She was named for her grandmother and had two children, Temanea Ereru Kauika-Quinlan in 1995 and Tania-Jade Waimarie Kauika-Fairbrother in 1997. National Party MP Tama Potaka was a relative.

== Career ==
Kemp developed the Rangatahi Mental Health Youth Hub with the University of Auckland and was its chief executive for 13 years. The program aimed to address high suicide rates in Māori youth.

She was director of Hip Hop International, the organisation that arranges the qualifying event for New Zealand teams in the World Hip Hop Championship. She was a trustee and Auckland manager for Street Dance New Zealand.

She was also chief executive of the Manurewa Marae and a prominent community voice for vaccination for South Auckland during the COVID-19 pandemic. In the 2021 Queen's Birthday Honours, Kemp was appointed an Officer of the New Zealand Order of Merit, for services to street dance and youth.

== Political career ==
New Zealand Parliament
Years	Term	Electorate	List	Party
2023–2025	54th	Tāmaki Makaurau	6	Te Pāti Māori

=== 2023 general election ===
Kemp was selected by Te Pāti Māori to contest the Tāmaki Makaurau seat at the 2023 election. She was 6th on the party list. The official results, released on 3 November 2023, showed Kemp had won the Tāmaki Makaurau electorate by 4 votes. Kemp received 10,050 electorate votes while Labour's candidate, Peeni Henare, received 10,046. A recount was requested; once completed, Kemp retained the seat with a final margin of 42 votes.

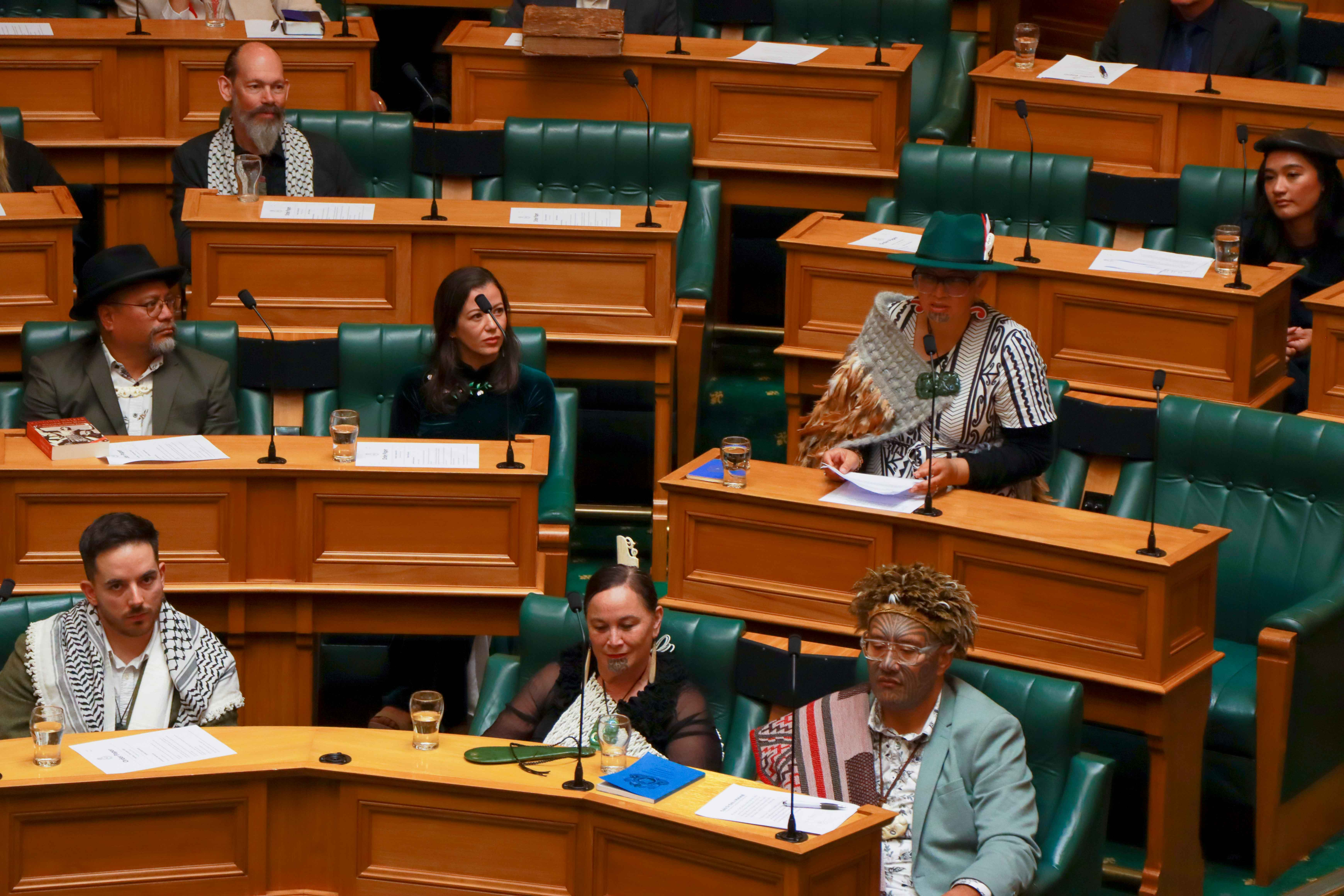
Kemp giving her maiden speech

Media reported that the Electoral Commission investigated complaints about voting at Manurewa Marae, which had been led by Kemp. The marae was used as a polling station, and according to video shown to Stuff, a Te Pāti Māori campaign song was played on loudspeakers during voting, and food was available for voters. Other media said the Commission had received no complaints.

Kemp gave her maiden statement on 12 December 2023 and stated her intentions to protect te reo Māori, tikanga and the environment. By mid-December 2023, Kemp had joined Parliament's social services and community select committee. She also became Te Pāti Māori's spokesperson for social development, Whānau Ora, disabilities, communities and volunteers, statistics, family and sexual violence, mental health, kaumātua (Māori elders), employment and training, workers' rights, and community affairs .

=== Census data breach allegations ===
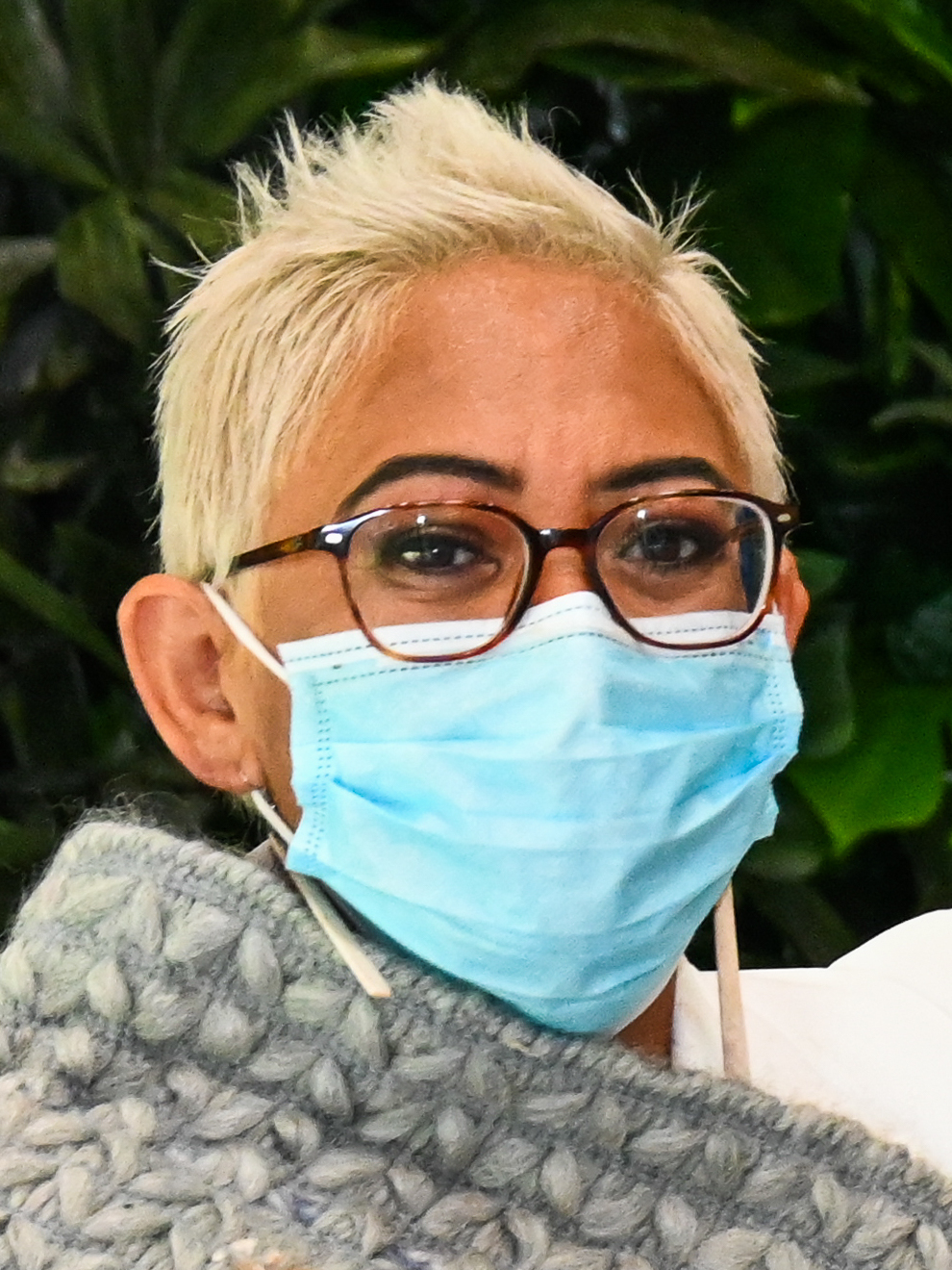
Kemp in 2022

On 2 June 2024, the Sunday Star-Times reported that Statistics New Zealand was investigating several allegations by former staff at Manurewa Marae that Te Pāti Māori had illegally used 2023 New Zealand census data to target voters in the Tāmaki Makaurau electorate during the 2023 election, and that participants were given supermarket vouchers, wellness packs, and food parcels to encourage them to fill out census forms and switch to the Māori electoral roll. A whistleblower from the Ministry of Social Development had alerted Statistics New Zealand and the Police. Kemp was implicated in the allegations both as the party's candidate and as the former chief executive of the marae. Te Pāti Māori leader John Tamihere denied the allegations and claimed that they were driven by disgruntled complainants. Tamihere did not permit Kemp to be interviewed but acknowledged that marae workers had given gifts to encourage people to participate in the census and to switch to the Māori roll.

Retired Māori academic Rawiri Taonui disputed the allegations against Manurewa Marae, Waipareira Trust and Te Pāti Māori; arguing that photocopies of census data collected at Manurewa Maare were taken solely for verification purposes and destroyed, highlighting that Statistics New Zealand had clarified that none of Tamihere, the Waipareira Trust, and the Whānau Ora Commissioning Agency had access to their database, disputing that vouchers were used to encourage people to switch to the Māori electoral roll, and denying that Te Pāti Māori flyers were included in wellbeing packs. Taonui also claimed that the whistleblowers were connected to Destiny Church and had instigated the allegations against Manurewa Marae and Te Pāti Māori following a failed attempt by the church to take over the marae.

On 22 January 2025, a Statistics New Zealand investigation cleared the Whānau Ora Commissioning Agency of data breaches during the census and referred allegations against Manurewa Marae to the Privacy Commissioner. The report also found no evidence that one of the alleged whistleblowers had attempted to contact Statistics NZ regarding allegations against the marae. On 11 February, The New Zealand Herald reported that a police inquiry into allegations regarding Te Pāti Māori's misuse of census data and Covid-19 vaccination information at Manurewa Marae during the 2023 general election was underway. On 2 October, the Police and Serious Fraud Office (SFO) halted their investigation into the Manurewa Marae electoral misconduct allegations after they found insufficient evidence to establish "criminal culpability for corruption." The SFO and Privacy Commissioner are still investigating potential privacy breaches.

== Illness and death ==
Kemp took six weeks of leave from Parliament to seek treatment for kidney disease from July 2024. When she returned to Parliament in September, she questioned the Minister of Health about patients being treated in corridors due to overcrowding and stated that she had been one of those patients. She celebrated her 50th birthday on 20 June 2025. Six days later, 1News reported she died at 2:00am that morning in Auckland, having returned home after the previous day's parliamentary session where she had sat in Debbie Ngarewa-Packer's front bench seat. It was also reported she had been waiting for a kidney transplant.

=== Tributes ===
Te Pāti Māori posted an online tribute to Kemp, confirming her death, at about 9:30 a.m. The party's co-leader Rawiri Waititi described her as the "calm in the [party's] storm." Other politicians, including Christopher Luxon, Chris Hipkins, David Seymour, and Winston Peters posted online tributes. A group of senior Labour Party MPs, including Kemp's former opponent in Tāmaki Makaurau Peeni Henare, appeared on TVNZ 1 to pay tribute. In several tributes, comparisons were made to Efeso Collins, another South Auckland-based MP who had died earlier the same term.

When the House of Representatives met that afternoon, senior Māori politicians and party leaders acknowledged Kemp's passing. Kemp's relative, Māori development minister Tama Potaka, led the speeches. Flowers, a hat, and a flag bearing Kemp's party logo adorned her vacant seat and members sang "Whakaaria Mai" before the House adjourned until its next scheduled sitting on 15 July. All flags on the parliamentary precinct were directed to fly at half mast for several days.

=== Tangi ===
Kemp's tangihanga (funeral) took place over several days at different marae. Her body was first taken to Hoani Waititi Marae in Auckland on 27 June before being transferred to Ōpaea Marae, Taihape, to be laid in state from 28 June. Her nēhu (burial service) was held at Ōpaea on 1 July 2025 and was livestreamed.

New Zealand Parliament
Preceded by Peeni Henare	Member of Parliament for Tāmaki Makaurau; 2023–2025	Succeeded by Oriini Kaipara
