= Tāmaki Makaurau (electorate) =

Māori electorate in New Zealand

Coordinates: 36.8404°S 174.7399°E

- Single-member Māori constituency for the New Zealand House of Representatives
- Formation: 2002
- Region: Auckland
- Character: Urban
- Term: 3 years

Member for Tāmaki Makaurau
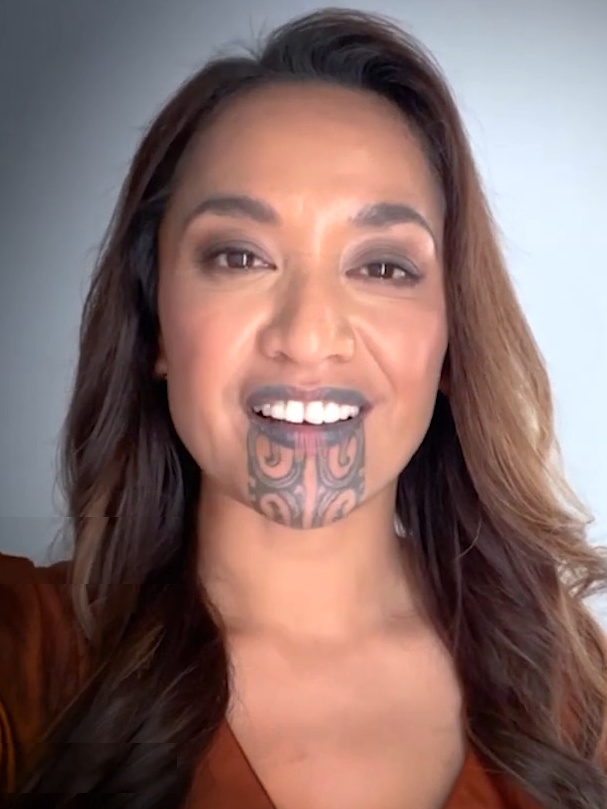
- Oriini Kaipara since 6 September 2025
- Party: Te Pāti Māori
- List MPs: Peeni Henare (Labour)
- Previous MP: Takutai Tarsh Kemp (Te Pāti Māori)
Party vote distribution

Tāmaki Makaurau is a New Zealand parliamentary Māori electorate returning one Member of Parliament to the New Zealand House of Representatives. The electorate covers central and southern Auckland, and southern parts of western Auckland. It was first formed for the 2002 election. Tāmaki Makaurau is a Māori-language name for Auckland.

The electorate was first held by the Labour Party's John Tamihere, for one term. It was held by Pita Sharples of the Māori Party for three terms from 2005 until his retirement in 2014. Peeni Henare of the Labour Party was elected in 2014 and served until his defeat in the 2023 election by Takutai Tarsh Kemp of Te Pāti Māori. Kemp died on 26 June 2025, and Oriini Kaipara was elected as the MP in a by-election held on 6 September 2025.

== Population centres ==
In its current boundaries, Tāmaki Makaurau contains the west coast of the Auckland Region between Te Henga / Bethells Beach and the mouth of the Manukau Harbour, parts of West Auckland east of the Oratia Stream and Te Wai-o-Pareira / Henderson Creek (excluding Te Atatū Peninsula), the entire Auckland isthmus, Waiheke Island, East Auckland and South Auckland as far as Takanini (including Māngere, Ōtara, Pakuranga and Manurewa). It does not contain Great Barrier or Rangitoto islands, as they are in Te Tai Tokerau; Papakura is in Hauraki-Waikato.

In the review of boundaries in 2007, the southern part of Manurewa shifted from Tāmaki Makaurau to the Hauraki-Waikato electorate. The 2013/14 redistribution did not further alter the boundaries of the electorate, but the 2020 boundary review made small expansions for Tāmaki Makaurau to the electorate's north and south, as well as incorporating the islands Waiheke and Ponui. To the north, Glendene and Te Atatū South are now included, while the southern portion now incorporates Flat Bush and Takanini.

== Tribal areas ==
The main iwi of Tāmaki Makaurau are Ngāti Whātua, Kawerau a Maki, Tainui, Ngāti Pāoa, Wai-O-Hua and Ngāti Rehua, though a pan-Māori organisation called Ngāti Akarana exists for urbanised Māori with no knowledge of their actual iwi; and, through a population trend whereby many rural Māori moved to the cities, the largest iwi affiliation in the seat are Ngāpuhi, Ngāti Porou, Waikato and Ngāti Maniapoto, all iwi local to other areas of New Zealand.

== History ==
Tāmaki Makaurau derives its name from the Māori-language name for Auckland, meaning "Tāmaki desired by many", in reference to the desirability of its natural resources and geography.

Tāmaki Makaurau was formed for the 2002 election from the northern part of the Hauraki electorate. John Tamihere of the Labour Party was the representative for Hauraki, and he also won the first election in the Tāmaki Makaurau electorate in 2002. Tamihere spent his six-year parliamentary career dogged by controversy that often overshadowed his work as a minister and, at the 2005 election came ten percent behind Māori Party co-leader Pita Sharples. Because Tamihere had chosen not to seek a list placing, his parliamentary career was terminated. Sharples remained the current representative for the electorate until his retirement, when the Labour's Peeni Henare won the seat.

=== Members of Parliament for Tāmaki Makaurau ===
Unless otherwise stated, all MPs terms began and ended at a general election.

Key

Labour Māori Party Green

| Election | Winner |
|---|---|
| 2002 election | John Tamihere |
| 2005 election | Pita Sharples |
| 2008 election | Pita Sharples |
| 2011 election | Pita Sharples |
| 2014 election | Peeni Henare |
| 2017 election | Peeni Henare |
| 2020 election | Peeni Henare |
| 2023 election | Takutai Tarsh Kemp |
| 2025 by-election | Oriini Kaipara |

=== List MPs from Tāmaki Makaurau ===
Members of Parliament elected from party lists in elections where that person also unsuccessfully contested the Tāmaki Makaurau electorate. Unless otherwise stated, all MPs terms began and ended at general elections.

| Election | Winner |
|---|---|
| 2002 election | Metiria Turei |
| 2011 | Louisa Wall^{1} |
| 2011 election | Shane Jones^{2} |
| 2015 | Marama Davidson^{3} |
| 2017 election | Marama Davidson^{3} |
| 2020 election | Marama Davidson^{3} |
| 2023 election | Peeni Henare |

^{1}Wall was elected from the party list in April 2011 following the resignation of Darren Hughes.
^{2}Jones resigned from Parliament on 22 May 2014.
^{3}Davidson was elected from the party list in November 2015 following the resignation of Russel Norman.

== Election results ==
=== 2026 election ===
The next election will be held on 7 November 2026. Candidates for Tāmaki Makaurau are listed at Candidates in the 2026 New Zealand general election by electorate § Tāmaki Makaurau. Official results will be available after 27 November 2026.

=== 2025 by-election ===
The following table shows the final results of the by-election:

2025 Tāmaki Makaurau by-election
Notes: Blue background denotes the winner of the by-election. Pink background denotes a candidate elected from their party list prior to the by-election. Yellow background denotes the winner of the by-election, who was a list MP prior to the by-election. A ✓ or ✗ denotes status of any incumbent, win or lose respectively.
| Party | Candidate | Votes | % | ±% |
|---|---|---|---|---|
| Te Pāti Māori | Oriini Kaipara | 6,948 | 65.01 | |
| Labour | Peeni Henare | 3,429 | 32.08 | |
| Vision NZ | Hannah Tamaki | 175 | 1.64 | |
| Independent | Sherry Lee Matene | 41 | 0.38 | |
| NZ Loyal | Kelvyn Alp | 26 | 0.24 | |
| Informal votes | | 69 | 0.65 | |
| Total Valid votes | | 10,619 | 99.35 | |
| Turnout | | 10,688 | | |
| Te Pāti Māori hold | Majority | 3,519 | 32.93 | |

=== 2023 election ===
2023 general election: Tāmaki Makaurau
| Notes: | Blue background denotes the winner of the electorate vote. Pink background denotes a candidate elected from their party list. Yellow background denotes an electorate win by a list member, or other incumbent. A ✓ or ✗ denotes status of any incumbent, win or lose respectively. | | | | | | |
| Party | Candidate | Votes | % | ±% | Party votes | % | ±% |
|---|---|---|---|---|---|---|---|
| Te Pāti Māori | Takutai Tarsh Kemp | 10,068 | 39.32 | +3.34 | 8,046 | 29.75 | +17.05 |
| Labour | ✗ Peeni Henare | 10,026 | 39.15 | –0.41 | 11,571 | 42.79 | –16.89 |
| Green | Darleen Tana | 2,925 | 11.42 | –7.89 | 3,229 | 12.31 | +1.81 |
| National | Hinurewa Te Hau | 1,275 | 4.97 | – | 1,269 | 4.69 | +1.48 |
| Vision NZ | Hannah Tamaki | 829 | 3.23 | – | | | |
| NZ First | | | | | 927 | 3.42 | –0.92 |
| Freedoms NZ | | | | | 478 | 1.76 | – |
| ACT | | | | | 254 | 0.93 | –0.13 |
| Opportunities | | | | | 248 | 0.91 | –0.11 |
| Legalise Cannabis | | | | | 246 | 0.90 | –0.57 |
| NZ Loyal | | | | | 174 | 0.64 | – |
| NewZeal | | | | | 121 | 0.44 | +0.20 |
| DemocracyNZ | | | | | 28 | 0.10 | – |
| Animal Justice | | | | | 27 | 0.09 | – |
| Women's Rights | | | | | 25 | 0.09 | – |
| New Conservatives | | | | | 13 | 0.04 | –0.48 |
| Leighton Baker Party | | | | | 7 | 0.02 | – |
| New Nation | | | | | 2 | 0.00 | – |
| Informal votes | | 481 | | | 373 | | |
| Total valid votes | | 25,604 | | | 27,038 | | |
| Te Pāti Māori gain from Labour | Majority | 42 | 0.16 | –3.42 | | | |

=== 2020 election ===
2020 general election: Tāmaki Makaurau
| Notes: | Blue background denotes the winner of the electorate vote. Pink background denotes a candidate elected from their party list. Yellow background denotes an electorate win by a list member, or other incumbent. A ✓ or ✗ denotes status of any incumbent, win or lose respectively. | | | | | | |
| Party | Candidate | Votes | % | ±% | Party votes | % | ±% |
|---|---|---|---|---|---|---|---|
| Labour | ✓ Peeni Henare | 10,256 | 39.56 | –7.95 | 16,066 | 59.98 | +0.64 |
| Māori Party | John Tamihere | 9,329 | 35.98 | +7.73 | 3,401 | 12.70 | +1.74 |
| Green | Marama Davidson | 5,006 | 19.31 | –2.27 | 2,801 | 10.46 | +3.22 |
| New Conservative | Erina Anderson | 427 | 1.65 | – | 138 | 0.52 | +0.40 |
| NZ First | | | | | 1,126 | 4.34 | –5.19 |
| National | | | | | 832 | 3.21 | –3.34 |
| Advance NZ | | | | | 490 | 1.83 | — |
| Legalise Cannabis | | | | | 393 | 1.47 | +0.73 |
| Vision NZ | | | | | 388 | 1.45 | – |
| ACT | | | | | 284 | 1.06 | +0.90 |
| Opportunities | | | | | 274 | 1.02 | –1.30 |
| ONE | | | | | 64 | 0.24 | — |
| Outdoors | | | | | 16 | 0.06 | +0.04 |
| Sustainable NZ | | | | | 13 | 0.05 | — |
| TEA | | | | | 8 | 0.03 | – |
| Social Credit | | | | | 5 | 0.02 | +0.01 |
| Heartland | | | | | 2 | 0.01 | — |
| Informal votes | | 910 | | | 485 | | |
| Total valid votes | | 25,928 | | | 26,786 | | |
| Labour hold | Majority | 927 | 3.58 | –15.68 | | | |

=== 2017 election ===
2017 general election: Tāmaki Makaurau
| Notes: | Blue background denotes the winner of the electorate vote. Pink background denotes a candidate elected from their party list. Yellow background denotes an electorate win by a list member, or other incumbent. A ✓ or ✗ denotes status of any incumbent, win or lose respectively. | | | | | | |
| Party | Candidate | Votes | % | ±% | Party votes | % | ±% |
|---|---|---|---|---|---|---|---|
| Labour | ✓ Peeni Henare | 9,396 | 47.51 | +10.03 | 12,220 | 59.34 | +18.59 |
| Māori Party | Shane Taurima | 5,587 | 28.25 | –1.96 | 2,258 | 10.96 | –1.76 |
| Green | Marama Davidson | 4,268 | 21.58 | +5.98 | 1,490 | 7.24 | –4.45 |
| NZ First | | | | | 1,963 | 9.53 | –4.45 |
| National | | | | | 1,348 | 6.55 | –4.17 |
| Opportunities | | | | | 477 | 2.32 | +2.32 |
| Mana | | | | | 364 | 1.77 | –8.95 |
| Legalise Cannabis | | | | | 153 | 0.74 | –0.22 |
| ACT | | | | | 32 | 0.16 | –0.03 |
| People's Party | | | | | 25 | 0.12 | +0.12 |
| Conservative | | | | | 24 | 0.12 | –0.49 |
| Ban 1080 | | | | | 10 | 0.05 | +0.03 |
| United Future | | | | | 6 | 0.03 | –0.05 |
| Outdoors | | | | | 4 | 0.02 | +0.02 |
| Democrats | | | | | 3 | 0.01 | – |
| Internet | | | | | 3 | 0.01 | +0.01 |
| Informal votes | | 526 | | | 213 | | |
| Total valid votes | | 19,777 | | | 20,593 | | |
| Labour hold | Majority | 3,809 | 19.26 | +11.99 | | | |

=== 2014 election ===
2014 general election: Tāmaki Makaurau
| Notes: | Blue background denotes the winner of the electorate vote. Pink background denotes a candidate elected from their party list. Yellow background denotes an electorate win by a list member, or other incumbent. A ✓ or ✗ denotes status of any incumbent, win or lose respectively. | | | | | | |
| Party | Candidate | Votes | % | ±% | Party votes | % | ±% |
|---|---|---|---|---|---|---|---|
| Labour | Peeni Henare | 7,533 | 37.48 | +2.39 | 8,432 | 40.45 | −1.05 |
| Māori Party | Rangi McLean | 6,071 | 30.21 | −10.19 | 2,651 | 12.72 | −2.73 |
| Green | Marama Davidson | 3,136 | 15.60 | +7.14 | 2,438 | 11.69 | +1.98 |
| Mana | Kereama Pene | 2,624 | 13.06 | -2.98 | | | |
| Independent | Raewyn Harrison | 317 | 1.58 | +1.58 | | | |
| NZ First | | | | | 2,914 | 13.98 | +3.53 |
| Internet Mana | | | | | 2,234 | 10.72 | −2.96 |
| National | | | | | 1,575 | 7.55 | −0.86 |
| Legalise Cannabis | | | | | 200 | 0.96 | −0.10 |
| Conservative | | | | | 128 | 0.61 | +0.11 |
| ACT | | | | | 39 | 0.19 | +0.04 |
| United Future | | | | | 16 | 0.08 | +0.03 |
| Focus | | | | | 6 | 0.03 | +0.03 |
| Ban 1080 | | | | | 5 | 0.02 | +0.02 |
| Independent Coalition | | | | | 4 | 0.02 | +0.02 |
| Democrats | | | | | 1 | 0.005 | -0.005 |
| Civilian | | | | | 1 | 0.005 | +0.005 |
| Informal votes | | 417 | | | 204 | | |
| Total valid votes | | 20,098 | | | 20,848 | | |
| Labour gain from Māori Party | Majority | 1,462 | 7.27 | +1.96 | | | |

=== 2011 election ===
2011 general election: Tāmaki Makaurau
| Notes: | Blue background denotes the winner of the electorate vote. Pink background denotes a candidate elected from their party list. Yellow background denotes an electorate win by a list member, or other incumbent. A ✓ or ✗ denotes status of any incumbent, win or lose respectively. | | | | | | |
| Party | Candidate | Votes | % | ±% | Party votes | % | ±% |
|---|---|---|---|---|---|---|---|
| Māori Party | ✓ Pita Sharples | 7,120 | 40.40 | −25.58 | 2,694 | 14.45 | −14.16 |
| Labour | Shane Jones | 6,184 | 35.09 | +7.75 | 7,739 | 41.50 | −8.23 |
| Mana | Kereama Pene | 2,827 | 16.04 | +16.04 | 2,551 | 13.68 | +13.68 |
| Green | Mikaere Curtis | 1,491 | 8.46 | +3.69 | 1,810 | 9.71 | +5.67 |
| NZ First | | | | | 1,948 | 10.45 | +4.56 |
| National | | | | | 1,569 | 8.41 | +1.00 |
| Legalise Cannabis | | | | | 197 | 1.06 | −0.08 |
| Conservative | | | | | 94 | 0.50 | +0.50 |
| ACT | | | | | 28 | 0.15 | −0.53 |
| United Future | | | | | 10 | 0.05 | −0.08 |
| Libertarianz | | | | | 4 | 0.02 | +0.01 |
| Alliance | | | | | 2 | 0.01 | −0.01 |
| Democrats | | | | | 2 | 0.01 | +0.01 |
| Informal votes | | 717 | | | 327 | | |
| Total valid votes | | 17,622 | | | 18,648 | | |
| Māori Party hold | Majority | 936 | 5.31 | −33.33 | | | |

Electorate (as at 26 November 2011): 35,347

=== 2008 election ===
2008 general election: Tāmaki Makaurau
| Notes: | Blue background denotes the winner of the electorate vote. Pink background denotes a candidate elected from their party list. Yellow background denotes an electorate win by a list member, or other incumbent. A ✓ or ✗ denotes status of any incumbent, win or lose respectively. | | | | | | |
| Party | Candidate | Votes | % | ±% | Party votes | % | ±% |
|---|---|---|---|---|---|---|---|
| Māori Party | ✓ Pita Sharples | 12,876 | 65.98 | +13.63 | 5,801 | 28.61 | +1.13 |
| Labour | Louisa Wall | 5,336 | 27.34 | −13.90 | 10,084 | 49.73 | −5.41 |
| Green | Mikaere Curtis | 931 | 4.77 | | 819 | 4.04 | −2.55 |
| Kiwi | Vapi Kupenga | 129 | 0.66 | | 28 | 0.14 | |
| Independent | Kane Te Waaka | 122 | 0.63 | | | | |
| Independent | Marama Nathan | 120 | 0.61 | | | | |
| National | | | | | 1,504 | 7.42 | +3.39 |
| NZ First | | | | | 1,193 | 5.88 | +0.56 |
| Family Party | | | | | 284 | 1.40 | |
| Legalise Cannabis | | | | | 230 | 1.13 | +0.42 |
| ACT | | | | | 137 | 0.68 | +0.47 |
| Bill and Ben | | | | | 71 | 0.35 | |
| Progressive | | | | | 38 | 0.19 | −0.15 |
| Pacific | | | | | 36 | 0.18 | |
| United Future | | | | | 27 | 0.13 | −0.31 |
| RAM | | | | | 10 | 0.05 | |
| Workers Party | | | | | 10 | 0.05 | |
| Alliance | | | | | 5 | 0.02 | −0.05 |
| Libertarianz | | | | | 2 | 0.01 | −0.01 |
| Democrats | | | | | 0 | 0.00 | −0.01 |
| RONZ | | | | | 0 | 0.00 | −0.01 |
| Informal votes | | 480 | | | 247 | | |
| Total valid votes | | 19,514 | | | 20,279 | | |
| Turnout | | 20,823 | 58.48 | −3.57 | | | |
| Māori Party hold | Majority | 7,540 | 38.64 | +27.53 | | | |

=== 2005 election ===
2005 general election: Tāmaki Makaurau
| Notes: | Blue background denotes the winner of the electorate vote. Pink background denotes a candidate elected from their party list. Yellow background denotes an electorate win by a list member, or other incumbent. A ✓ or ✗ denotes status of any incumbent, win or lose respectively. | | | | | | |
| Party | Candidate | Votes | % | ±% | Party votes | % | ±% |
|---|---|---|---|---|---|---|---|
| Māori Party | Pita Sharples | 10,024 | 52.35 | | 5,457 | 27.48 | |
| Labour | ✗ John Tamihere | 7,897 | 41.24 | −32.11 | 10,951 | 55.14 | |
| Destiny | Tauwehi Hemahema-Tāmati | 675 | 3.53 | | 520 | 2.62 | |
| Independent | Sam Rerekura | 494 | 2.58 | | | | |
| Direct Democracy | Eugene Opai | 57 | 0.30 | | 18 | 0.09 | |
| NZ First | | | | | 1,057 | 5.32 | |
| National | | | | | 801 | 4.03 | |
| Green | | | | | 652 | 3.28 | |
| Legalise Cannabis | | | | | 141 | 0.71 | |
| United Future | | | | | 87 | 0.44 | |
| Progressive | | | | | 67 | 0.34 | |
| ACT | | | | | 42 | 0.21 | |
| Family Rights | | | | | 20 | 0.10 | |
| Christian Heritage | | | | | 14 | 0.07 | |
| Alliance | | | | | 13 | 0.07 | |
| 99 MP | | | | | 9 | 0.05 | |
| One NZ | | | | | 5 | 0.03 | |
| Libertarianz | | | | | 3 | 0.02 | |
| Democrats | | | | | 1 | 0.01 | |
| RONZ | | | | | 1 | 0.01 | |
| Informal votes | | 363 | | | 199 | | |
| Total valid votes | | 19,147 | | | 19,859 | | |
| Turnout | | 20,440 | 62.05 | +7.83 | | | |
| Māori Party gain from Labour | Majority | 2,127 | 11.11 | | | | |

=== 2002 election ===
2002 general election: Tāmaki Makaurau
| Notes: | Blue background denotes the winner of the electorate vote. Pink background denotes a candidate elected from their party list. Yellow background denotes an electorate win by a list member, or other incumbent. A ✓ or ✗ denotes status of any incumbent, win or lose respectively. | | | | | | |
| Party | Candidate | Votes | % | ±% | Party votes | % | ±% |
|---|---|---|---|---|---|---|---|
| Labour | ✓ John Tamihere | 11,445 | 73.35 | | 9,052 | 55.97 | |
| Green | Metiria Turei | 2,001 | 12.82 | | 1,659 | 10.26 | |
| National | George Rongokino Ngatai | 785 | 5.03 | | 516 | 3.19 | |
| Alliance | Janice Smith | 550 | 3.52 | | 470 | 2.91 | |
| Christian Heritage | Tuhimareikura Vaha'akolo | 472 | 3.02 | | 240 | 1.48 | |
| Progressive | Sue Wharewhaka-Topia Watts | 351 | 2.25 | | 228 | 1.41 | |
| NZ First | | | | | 2,430 | 15.03 | |
| Mana Māori | | | | | 464 | 2.87 | |
| Legalise Cannabis | | | | | 423 | 2.62 | |
| United Future | | | | | 411 | 2.54 | |
| ACT | | | | | 223 | 1.38 | |
| ORNZ | | | | | 51 | 0.32 | |
| One NZ | | | | | 4 | 0.02 | |
| NMP | | | | | 2 | 0.01 | |
| Informal votes | | 380 | | | 122 | | |
| Total valid votes | | 15,604 | | | 16,173 | | |
| Turnout | | 16,688 | 54.22 | | | | |
| Labour win new seat | Majority | 9,444 | 60.52 | | | | |
