= National Iwi Chairs Forum =

New Zealand organisation

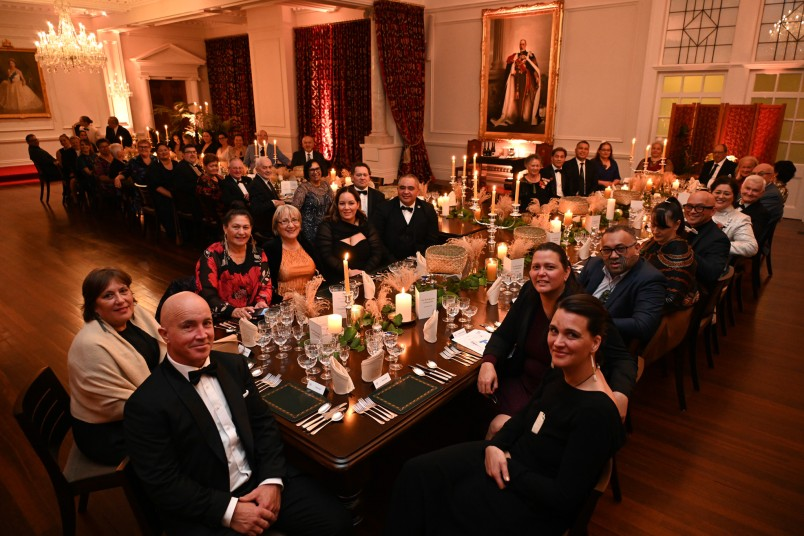
Iwi leaders and the governor-general, Dame Cindy Kiro, and vice-regal consort, Richard Davies, at the 2023 Matariki dinner at Government House, Wellington, on 14 July 2023

The National Iwi Chairs Forum is an entity founded in 2005 made up of the chairpersons of 71 iwi groups in New Zealand, facilitating the sharing of information among iwi leaders. The Forum holds meetings four times a year at different marae throughout the country and brings together Māori leaders around strategic topics.

== Organisation ==
The National Iwi Chairs Forum was formed in 2005 with the aim of increasing mana motuhake, or autonomy and self-governance, and held its first meeting at Takahanga Marae in Kaikōura in November 2005. It was the brainchild of Ngāi Tahu leader Mark Solomon. It has also been known as the Iwi Leaders Forum or the Iwi Leadership Forum.

The second meeting was a three-day hui held at Pipitea Marae in Wellington in March 2006. That meeting was criticised by the then chairman of the National Urban Māori Authority, Willie Jackson, who said that it was ignorant of the iwi leaders to exclude urban Māori. Peter Love, spokesman for the Iwi Chairs Forum, said that the meeting was for "traditional Māori iwi-based runanga and trusts who have come together to discuss the future of Māoridom", and that representatives of urban Māori were not invited because they were not a traditional grouping of Māori. Members of Parliament Parekura Horomia and Shane Jones were disappointed that the media was excluded from the meeting. The Forum has since then maintained its stance of keeping a low profile in the media. In 2010 it was accused of a lack of transparency by lawyer and activist Annette Sykes.

In 2023, people at the leadership of the Forum included Margaret Mutu, Te Huia Bill Hamilton, Naida Glavish, Lorraine Toki, Kirikowhai Mikaere, Maxine Graham, Pahia Turia, Te Mauri Kingi, Tania Blyth-Williams, Selwyn Parata, Tina Porou, Rukumoana Schaafhausen, Donna Flavell, Mike Smith, Lisa Tumahai, Hinekaa Mako and Mike Neho. Others involved included Pou Tahua, one of the chairs in 2022. The Pou Tangata chair in 2021 was Rāhui Papa.

== Work and views ==
=== Meetings with the New Zealand government ===
The Iwi Chairs Forum often meets with the New Zealand government. The National government met regularly with the Iwi Chairs Forum during their nine years in office from 2008 to 2017. In 2020 the Forum met with prime minister Jacinda Ardern at Waitangi. Amohaere Houkaamou commented that the Labour government at that time had "been a lot more stand-off than the previous government... this government has a lot to learn from the previous government". Ward Kamo of Ngāi Tahu has suggested that this difference in treatment may have been due to the role of Te Pāti Māori in the earlier National government.

In 2022 the Forum reported that there were many positive developments in their relationship with the Crown, including the Iwi Housing Prototype and the Whenua Māori initiatives.

=== Other work ===
The Forum has occasionally established special interest working groups to deal with issues of particular interest to Māori. In 2011 it had groups for climate change and for foreshore and seabed issues, both chaired by Mark Solomon, as well as groups on national water management, public-private partnership investment opportunities for iwi, and healthcare policy.

In 2013 the Forum said that iwi were not ruling out investing in the charter school model. The Forum's view was that iwi want an education system which allows Māori to have a say and iwi are prepared to resource it.

In 2014 the Forum called for the government to stop selling public housing that it owned through Housing New Zealand. The government wanted iwi and local communities to provide public housing, but the Iwi Chairs Forum stated that iwi were not in a position to make commercial decisions because they had not yet received funds via Treaty settlements. Bill English, the minister responsible for Housing New Zealand at the time, would not commit to a moratorium but said his ministry remained in contact with the Iwi Chairs.

In March 2020 the National Iwi Chairs Forum Pandemic Response Group (NICF-PRG) was established to "save Māori lives and the lives of those immediately around them" by getting the government to reprioritise its policies and the needs of Māori people.

In 2021 there was a two-day meeting at Takapūwāhia marae in Porirua hosted by Ngāti Toa, with each iwi afforded the opportunity to give feedback on how the Māori Health Authority would function to support all Māori.

The Forum holds regular meetings at various locations. In 2023 there was one meeting in the South Island.

In December 2024, the Forum wrote an open letter to King Charles III requesting that he intervene in New Zealand politics to address the Sixth National Government's alleged breaches of promises made to Māori under the Treaty of Waitangi.
