= Te Pāti Māori =

New Zealand political party promoting indigenous rights

- Co-leaders: Debbie Ngarewa-Packer; Rawiri Waititi
- President: John Tamihere
- Founder: Tariana Turia
- Founded: 7 July 2004; 22 years ago
- Split from: Labour Party
- Ideology: Māori rights; Tino rangatiratanga; Progressivism
- Political position: Left-wing
- Colours: Red; Black; White
- House of Representatives: 4 / 123
- Regional councillors: 2 / 132
- Local councillors: 3 / 718

Website
- www.maoriparty.org.nz

Te Pāti Māori (Māori pronunciation: [tɛ ˈpaːti ˈmaːɔɾi]) is a left-wing political party in New Zealand that advocates Māori rights. Founded as the Māori Party in 2004, it changed its name to Te Pāti Māori in 2023. Except for a handful of general electorates, it contests the reserved Māori electorates, in which its main rival is the Labour Party.

Under the current parliamentary leadership of Rawiri Waititi and Debbie Ngarewa-Packer, it has policies of upholding tikanga Māori, dismantling systemic racism, and strengthening the rights promised in Te Tiriti o Waitangi, including tino rangatiratanga (Māori sovereignty). It is also committed to a mixture of democratic socialist and green policies through a "Tiriti-centric" lens. This includes removing Goods and Services Tax from food, opposing deep sea drilling, organising and funding a Māori health authority, lifting the minimum wage to $25 an hour, returning Department of Conservation land to Māori control (kaitiakitanga), and reducing homelessness. Since Waititi and Ngarewa-Packer became leaders in 2020, the party has been described as left-wing and progressive.

Tariana Turia founded the Māori Party after resigning from the governing Labour Party, in which she served as a minister, over the foreshore and seabed ownership controversy. She and Pita Sharples, a high-profile academic, were the first co-leaders. The party won four Māori seats in the 2005 election and went into Opposition. After the 2008, 2011 and 2014 elections, where the party won five, three and two Māori seats respectively, it supported a government led by the centre-right National Party, with the Māori Party co-leaders serving as ministers outside cabinet. During this time, the party advocated more moderate politics.

The party won no seats in the 2017 election, which was attributed to backlash for their support of National. Under new leadership they returned to parliament in the 2020 election when Waititi won the Waiariki electorate. Although the party's share of the country-wide party vote declined marginally from 1.18% in 2017 to 1.17% in 2020, winning Waiariki gave the party full proportional representation and two members of parliament, with co-leader Ngarewa-Packer becoming a list member. Waititi joined Ngarewa-Packer as co-leader in October 2020 and the pair led the party to win six electorate seats and 3.08% of the popular vote in the 2023 election. In 2025, the national council voted to expel MPs Mariameno Kapa-Kingi and Tākuta Ferris from the party. On 10 March 2026, a High Court ruling reinstated Kapa-Kingi.

== History ==
=== Formation ===
The origins of Te Pāti Māori can be traced back to the 2004 foreshore and seabed controversy, a debate about whether the Māori have legitimate claim to ownership of part or all of New Zealand's foreshore and seabed that arose during the Fifth Labour Government. A court judgement stated that some Māori appeared to have the right to seek formal ownership of a specific portion of seabed in the Marlborough Sounds. This prospect alarmed many sectors of New Zealand society however, and the Labour Party foreshadowed legislation in favour of state ownership instead. This angered many Māori, including many of Labour's Māori MPs. Two MPs representing Māori electorates, Tariana Turia and Nanaia Mahuta, announced an intent to vote against the legislation.

Turia, a junior minister, after being informed that voting against the government would appear "incompatible" with holding ministerial rank, announced on 30 April 2004 her intention to resign from the Labour Party. Her resignation took effect on 17 May, and she left parliament until she won a by-election in her Te Tai Hauauru seat two months later. After leaving the Labour Party, Turia, later joined by Sharples, began organising a new political party. They and their supporters agreed that the new organisation would simply use the name of "the Māori Party". They chose a logo of black and red – traditional Māori colours – incorporating a traditional koru design. The party constitution provides that there are two party co-leaders, one male and one female. Turia and Sharples were the first to fill these roles. They indicated that they wished to unite "all Māori" into a single political movement. The party was formally established on 7 July 2004.

=== 2005 election and first term in Parliament ===
In the 2005 election, the Māori Party won four out of seven Māori seats and 2.12% of the party vote. The latter entitled the party to only three list seats, so the fourth electorate seat caused an overhang seat. In the election night count, the party vote share was under 2% and the Māori Party would have got two overhang seats; when the overhang was reduced to one, National lost a list seat that they appeared to have won on election night. Tariana Turia held Te Tai Hauauru; Pita Sharples won the Tāmaki Makaurau electorate; Hone Harawira, son of Titewhai Harawira, won Te Tai Tokerau; and Te Ururoa Flavell won Waiariki.

In the post-election period the Māori Party convened a series of hui to decide whether to support Labour or National, though some party leaders indicated they preferred to deal with Labour. National Party deputy leader Gerry Brownlee and leader Don Brash tried to win over the Māori Party and claimed that it would support National to form a government, although Turia denied this. She met privately with prime minister Helen Clark and ruled out a formal coalition. Later, the Māori Party decided to remain in opposition and not be part of a Labour-led government.

On 24 January 2006 the Māori Party's four MPs were jointly welcomed to Rātana pā with Brash and a delegation of eight National MPs. They had been intended to be welcomed on half an hour apart but agreed to be welcomed and sit together. Turia disputed claims that this was pre-arranged, saying: "We're here for a birthday. We're not here for politics." However critics said this would have reminded onlookers of how the Māori Party and National were said to be in coalition or confidence and supply talks. This may also have served to reinforce the Labour Party's election campaign statement that a 'vote for the Māori Party is a vote for National'. One Rātana kaumatua (elder) said this was deliberate and deserved after the talks.

=== Supporting a National-led government: 2008–2017 ===
In the 2008 general election the Māori Party retained all four of the seats it won in 2005, and won an additional seat, when Rahui Katene won Te Tai Tonga from Labour. Two seats were overhang seats. The party's share of the party vote rose slightly to 2.39%. The Labour Party won the party vote by a large majority in every Māori electorate, meaning that the typical Māori voter had split their vote, voting for a Māori Party candidate with their electorate vote and the Labour Party with their party vote.

The National Party won the most seats overall and formed a minority government with the support of the Māori Party, ACT New Zealand and United Future. Sharples was given the Minister of Māori Affairs portfolio and became an Associate Minister of Corrections and Associate Minister of Education. Turia became Minister for the Community and Voluntary Sector, Associate Minister of Health and Associate Minister for Social Development and Employment. Hone Harawira was critical of the alliance with the National Party and was suspended from the Māori Party in February 2011. He left the party and formed the left-wing Mana Party in April 2011.

Competing against Mana, the Māori Party's strength diminished. In the 2011 general election, it won only three electorates (with 1.43% of the party vote, the party was entitled to two seats, resulting in an overhang of one seat). The three MPs were Pita Sharples in Tāmaki Makaurau, Tariana Turia in Te Tai Hauāuru and Te Ururoa Flavell in Waiāriki. Rahui Katene lost the Te Tai Tonga seat to Labour's Rino Tirikatene, and Hone Harawira won the Te Tai Tokerau seat for the Mana Party. The National Party again formed a minority government with the support of the Māori Party, ACT New Zealand and United Future. Sharples and Turia were returned as ministers outside cabinet. Ahead of the 2014 general election, Flavell became the male co-leader. Neither Sharples nor Turia stood for re-election. At the election, Flavell held Waiāriki electorate seat, and the party was entitled to one further list seat as it received 1.32% of the party vote. This went to Marama Fox, who became the next female co-leader.

Prior to the 2017 general election, the Māori Party formed an electoral pact with the Mana Movement leader and former Māori Party MP Hone Harawira. The Māori Party agreed not to contest Te Tai Tokerau as part of a deal for the two parties to try to regain the Māori electorates from the Labour Party. In the election, they failed to take any seats, with Labour capturing all seven of the Māori electorates. Party co-leader Te Ururoa Flavell expressed sadness at the loss of seats and announced he would be resigning from politics. Fellow co-leader Marama Fox expressed bitterness at the party's defeat, remarking that New Zealand had chosen to return to the "age of colonization" and attacked the two major parties, National and Labour, for their alleged paternalism towards Māori. Fox commented that Māori have "gone back like a beaten wife to the abuser" in regards to Labour's sweep of the Māori seats. Metro Magazine described the Māori Party's poor results as being part of backlash against them for helping National form a government. Within the following 12 months, the party's senior figures resigned: Flavell and Fox stepped down from the co-leadership and party president Tukoroirangi Morgan also resigned. This opened the field for a new generation of party leaders, namely Rāwiri Waititi and Debbie Ngarewa-Packer.

=== 2020 general election ===
The party announced John Tamihere as its candidate for the Tāmaki Makaurau electorate in March 2020. Tamihere had held the electorate from 2002 to 2005, but for the Labour Party. He had also run for Mayor of Auckland in 2019 without success. Tamihere's mayoral campaign was more right-wing, and he said the Māori Party could happily work with the National Party. This contradicted Māori Party President Che Wilson, who had set out a clear preference to work with Labour and had said "if we ever do talk to National it will have to be a big deal for us to move that way again."

On 15 April 2020, the party announced that John Tamihere and Debbie Ngarewa-Packer were the new party co-leaders.

In late May 2020, the party received a broadcasting allocation of $145,101 for the 2020 election.

In September 2020, Ikaroa-Rāwhiti candidate Heather Te Au-Skipworth released the party's sports policy which included establishing a national Māori sporting body and investing in Māori sporting scholarships and programs. She also stated "it is a known fact that Māori genetic makeup is stronger than others... Our ancestors were not just athletic, they were also strategic thinkers with intentions to survive. This all required stamina, resilience, endurance, speed, agility and logic." The genetic superiority remarks were subsequently deleted prior to the 2023 New Zealand general election.

At the 2020 general election, held in October, the Māori Party's Rawiri Waititi captured the Waiariki electorate, defeating Labour MP Tāmati Coffey by a margin of 836 votes. This allowed the Māori Party to enter Parliament, and with its party vote of 1.2%, it was entitled to two MPs. After Waititi, Ngarewa-Packer entered Parliament as the highest-ranked person on the party list. As the only male Māori Party MP, Waititi replaced Tamihere as a co-leader.

On 11 November, former party co-leader Tamihere requested a vote recount in the Māori electorates of Tāmaki Makaurau and Te Tai Hauāuru, alleging Māori voters had encountered discrimination during the 2020 election. Tamihere claimed that the recount was intended to expose discriminatory laws such as the five-yearly Māori Electoral Option (which limited the ability of Māori to switch between the general and Māori rolls for a period five years). He also alleged longer wait times for Māori voters at election booths and some Māori not being allowed to vote on the Māori roll.

=== 2020–2023 parliamentary term ===
On 26 November 2020, Te Pāti Māori MPs Waititi and Ngarewa-Packer walked out of Parliament after the Speaker of the House Trevor Mallard would not allow them to speak due to parliamentary procedures limiting the speaking time by smaller parties. Waititi had attempted to pass a motion that their party leaders be allowed to give a 15-minute "address in reply" but Mallard had blocked the motion on the grounds that MPs from smaller parties were not scheduled to give their maiden speeches until the following week. Waititi described Mallard's decision as unfair while Ngarewa-Packer claimed that this was "another example of the Māori voice being silenced and ignored."

==== 2020 election donations investigation ====
On 12 April 2021, the Electoral Commission referred Te Pāti Māori to the Police for failing to disclose about NZ$320,000 worth of donations within the required timeframe. These donations came from several individuals and organisations including former party co-leader Tamihere (NZ$158,223.72), the Urban Māori Authority (NZ$48,879.85), and the Aotearoa Te Kahu Limited Partnership (NZ$120,000). Party President Che Wilson attributed the late disclosure to the fact that the party was staffed by volunteers and rookies who were unfamiliar with electoral finance laws. On 29 April, the Police referred the investigation into the Māori Party's undeclared donations to the Serious Fraud Office. By late September 2022, the Serious Fraud Office had closed the investigation and decided not to pursue prosecutions against the individuals and parties involved.

In late September 2022, Charities Services general manager Natasha Weight confirmed that the agency was investigating two charities headed by Party President Tamihere, the Te Whānau Waipareira Trust and the National Urban Māori Authority, for financing his 2020 election campaign. According to the Charities Register, Te Whānau o Waipareira Trust Group had loaned Tamihere NZ$385,307 to support his 2020 election campaign while the National Urban Māori Authority had paid NZ$82,695 to support his 2020 election campaign and Te Pāti Māori aspirations. Under existing legislation, charities are not allowed to donate and endorse political parties and candidates or allow them to use a charity's resources. In response, Tamihere accused the Charities Services of discriminating against Te Pāti Māori and Māori causes. Tamihere and Te Pāti Māori also confirmed that they would litigate against the Charities Service if the agency ruled against them. Tamihere also criticised The New Zealand Herald journalist Matt Nippert's coverage of the two charities' donations to his campaigns, accusing the newspaper of racism and announcing that Te Pāti Māori would boycott the Herald.

==== Hate Speech Task Force, 2021 ====
In June 2021, Te Pāti Māori called for a joint task force between the New Zealand Security Intelligence Service and New Zealand Police targeting right-wing extremists and rising anti-Māori hate speech in response to a YouTube video featuring a masked man calling for the slaughter of Māori and for a civil war. The video was later removed by YouTube for a breach of its community guidelines. In a tweet, the party said that the video contained threats against its MPs, marae and Māori. Police arrested a man after receiving multiple complaints about the video and a day after Te Pāti Māori laid a complaint with the Independent Police Conduct Authority (IPCA). A 44-year-old male was charged with making an objectionable publication.

In the complaint to the IPCA, the party accused the police of having double standards when dealing with death threats made against Pākehā and Māori. It compared the police's response to the video with the treatment of those who made death threats against National MP Simeon Brown. Ngarewa-Packer stated, "Communication and response time was inadequate, the police have continued to minimise the nature of the threat against us and our people".

==== Racial discrimination ====
On 29 August 2023, Te Pāti Māori made a series of tweets apologising to refugee and migrant communities for "harmful narratives" of "xenophobia and racism" on their official party website. Te Pāti Māori said they had removed words for their website and was rewriting policy documents. An example of policy rewriting included the "Indigenous First" framework in the party's Whānau Build policy. The policy indicated the intent to place Māori housing needs before all others. In 2022, Te Pāti Māori also removed a reference from its sports policy that claimed Māori genetic makeup was stronger than others.

==== Whaitiri joins party ====
On 3 May 2023, sitting minister Meka Whaitiri announced that she had left the Labour Party to join Te Pāti Māori. Speaker of the House Adrian Rurawhe confirmed that Whaitiri would serve the remainder of her 2020–2023 term as an independent member of Parliament under standing order 35(5), which avoids invoking the "waka-jumping" provisions of the Electoral (Integrity) Amendment Act 2018. Whaitiri does not sit with her party in Parliament. She will recontest the Ikaroa-Rāwhiti electorate as a Māori Party candidate.

On 10 May, Ngarewa-Packer and Waititi held a haka (dance) during Parliamentary proceedings to welcome Whaitiri to the Māori Party. In response, Rurawhe ordered Ngarewa-Packer and Waititi to leave Parliament since they had not obtained the permission of the Speaker or other parliamentary parties to hold the haka.

==== Name change ====
The party registered its current name, Te Pāti Māori, with the Electoral Commission on 12 July 2023, replacing its previous name, the Māori Party.

=== 2023 election ===
Te Pāti Māori launched its 2023 general election campaign at Te Whānau O Waipareira's Matariki event in Henderson, Auckland on 14 July. The party campaigned on advancing the interests of the Māori people, combating racism, and the "second-rate" status of Māori, as Ngarewa-Packer labelled it.

On 27 July, the party announced several redistributive tax policies including a zero tax policy on those earning below NZ$30,000, a new 48% tax on those earning above NZ$300,000, raising the companies tax rate back to 33% and a wealth tax on millionaires. On 2 August, the party campaigned on ending state care for Māori children and replacing the present Oranga Tamariki (Ministry for Children) with an independent Mokopuna Māori Authority that would network with Māori organisations, iwi (tribes), and hapū (sub-groups) to ensure that Māori children remained connected with their whakapapa (genealogies).

In late August 2023, Te Pāti Māori revised its Whanau Build (housing) policy to eliminate an "indigenous first" provision which called for immigration to be curbed until the country's housing supply was addressed. The party also apologised to migrant and refugee communities for promoting what it described as "harmful narratives" on its website, and reiterated that it would treat everyone like how they would be treated as guests on a marae.

During an interview with TVNZ journalist Jack Tame in September 2023, Waititi also denied that his party's sports policy' comments about "Māori genetic makeup being stronger than others" were racist. These comments were subsequently deleted from Te Pāti Māori's website. When challenged by Tame, he responded that TPM was "trying to empower people that are climbing out from the bottom of the bonnet of colonial violence for the last 193 years" by encouraging pride in their heritage.

Te Pāti Māori won six electorate seats and 3.08% of the popular vote. Meka Whaitiri stood as the party's candidate in the Ikaroa-Rāwhiti electorate but was defeated by Labour's candidate Cushla Tangaere-Manuel. Despite Whaitiri's unseating, the 2023 election outcome was Te Pāti Māori's most successful election result.

==== 2023 election data breach allegations ====
On 2 June 2024, the Sunday Star Times journalist Andrea Vance reported that Statistics New Zealand was investigating allegations by former staff at Manurewa Marae that Te Pāti Māori had illegally used 2023 New Zealand census data to target Māori electorate voters in the Tāmaki Makaurau electorate during the 2023 election, and that participants were given supermarket vouchers, wellness packs and food parcels to encourage them to fill out census forms and switch to the Māori electoral roll. Te Pāti Māori's candidate Takutai Tarsh Kemp had won the Tāmaki Makaurau electorate during the 2023 general election. A whistleblower from the Ministry of Social Development (MSD) had alerted Statistics NZ and the Police. In response, Te Pāti Māori leader Tamihere denied the allegations and claimed that they were made by disgruntled former staff. Tamihere said that the marae had been working with the Whānau Ora Commissioning Agency to promote Māori participation in the 2023 census. Tamihere also acknowledged that marae workers had given gifts to encourage people to participate in the 2023 Census and switch to the Māori roll but denied allegations of wrongdoing.

On 5 June, Vance reported that the Labour Party had filed a complaint against Te Pāti Māori in November 2023 for allegedly using personal information collected during the COVID-19 immunisation programme for political campaigning purposes during the 2023 election, which constitutes a breach of electoral law. Labour's complaint alleged that Māori voters in Auckland had received two text messages from the text code 2661 urging them to vote for Te Pāti Māori. 2661 was registered with the Waipareira Trust, which is led by TPM's President Tamihere. In response, Labour leader Chris Hipkins, ACT New Zealand leader David Seymour, Prime Minister and National Party leader Christopher Luxon called for an investigation into the allegations against TPM. The Privacy Commissioner also confirmed that Statistics NZ had alerted it to a potential privacy breach during its investigation. Chief statistician Mark Sowden also called for anyone with information to contact Statistics NZ. In response to the second allegations, Tamihere issued a press release denouncing the allegations as baseless and claiming that the party was being targeted by opponents for speaking up for Māori. Tamihere also accused Destiny Church leader Brian Tamaki and his followers of attempting to take over Manurewa Marae.

On 7 June, co-leaders Waititi and Ngarewa-Packer called for an urgent Police investigation into the data breach allegations made against Te Pāti Māori. Police confirmed they were already investigating complaints they had received. That same day, acting Public Service Commissioner Heather Baggott convened a meeting with the heads of the Statistics New Zealand, the Ministry of Health, Te Whatu Ora (Health New Zealand), the Ministry of Social Development, the Ministry of Justice, the Department of Internal Affairs, Te Puni Kōkiri (Ministry for Māori Development), Oranga Tamariki (Ministry for Children) and the Department of the Prime Minister and Cabinet, the New Zealand Police and Electoral Commission to ensure that all relevant agencies were investigating the data breach allegations

On 10 June 2024, Prime Minister Luxon announced that the Public Service Commission would launch an independent inquiry into government agencies' safeguards for protecting people's personal data and the circumstances surrounding the data breach allegations against Te Pāti Māori. The party was not notified of the Commission's inquiry. Employment advocate Allan Hulse, who represented six former Manurewa Marae staff and the MSD employee, alleged that 1,400 census forms were photocopied and uploaded into a database owned by the Waiparera Trust. Hulse also alleged that staff used census data to help people transfer from the general to Māori roll. Tamihere has rejected these allegations, calling for people to produce "hard evidence."

In early July 2024, former Māori academic Rawiri Taonui disputed the allegations against Te Pāti Māori, the Waipareira Trust and Manurewa Marae; arguing that photocopies of census data were taken solely for verification purposes and destroyed, highlighting that Statistics New Zealand had clarified that neither Tamihera, the Waipareira Trust and the Whanau Ora Commissioning Agency had access to their database, disputing that vouchers were used to encourage people to switch to the Māori electoral roll, and denying that Māori Party flyers were included in wellbeing packs. In late August 2024, Taonui claimed that the whistleblowers were connected to Destiny Church and had instigated the allegations against Manurewa Marae and Te Pāti Māori following a failed attempt by the church to take over the marae.

On 22 January 2025, a Statistics New Zealand report cleared the Whanau Ora Commissioning Agency of data breaches during the 2023 Census, finding that the agency increased Māori participation. The report made nine recommendations to improve Statistics NZ's procedures and referred allegations against Manurewa Marae to the Privacy Commissioner. The report also found no evidence that one of the alleged whistleblowers had attempted to contact Statistics NZ regarding allegations against the marae.

On 11 February 2025, The New Zealand Herald reported that Detective Superintendent Ross McKay was leading the inquiry into allegations regarding Te Pāti Māori's misuse of census data and Covid-19 vaccination information at Manurewa Marae for electoral campaigning purposes. On 2 October, the Police and Serious Fraud Office (SFO) halted their investigation into the Manurewa Marae electoral misconduct allegations after they found insufficient evidence of corruption. The SFO and Privacy Commissioner are still investigating potential privacy breaches.

=== 2023–present: In opposition ===
Ngarewa Packer stated that the party would serve as "the only true opposition" in Parliament for the next term, adding that their plans were "to shake Parliament up and normalise it for Māori." During the opening of the 54th New Zealand Parliament on 5 December 2023, Te Pāti Māori organised a series of nationwide protests known as the National Māori Action Day to protest against the National-led coalition government's policies on co-governance and the Treaty of Waitangi. The party's MPs also modified their oaths of allegiances to reference the Treaty of Waitangi.

In late May 2024, Te Pāti Māori and the Toitu Te Tiriti movement called for a nationwide day of protest known as "Toitū Te Tiriti National Day of Action" to coincide with the release of the 2024 New Zealand budget on 30 May. The protest was in opposition to the National-led government perceived assault on Tangata whenua and the Treaty of Waitangi. The party urged all Māori to go on strike and attend hīkoi (protests) near their location. Protest action includes a car convoy travelling from State Highway 1 south of Auckland to Hamilton. Te Pāti Māori claimed that 100,000 people attended the "car-koi activation" rallies nationwide and advocated the establishment of a Māori parliament.

On 14 November 2024, Te Pāti Māori MP Hana-Rawhiti Maipi-Clarke along with co-leaders Waititi, Ngarewa-Packer and Labour MP Peeni Henare led a protest haka (Ka Mate) that disrupted vote proceedings during the first reading of ACT party leader David Seymour's contentious Treaty Principles Bill. On 10 December, the four were referred to Parliament's Privileges Committee for their disruptive actions. In late March 2025, the Privileges Committee ruled that Henare had acted in a "disorderly" way in joining the TPM-led haka but ruled that his actions did not amount to "contempt." On 14 May 2025, the Committee found Maipi-Clarke, Waititi and Ngarewa-Packer in contempt of Parliament. Maipi-Clarke was suspended from Parliament for seven days while Waititi and Ngarewa-Packer were suspended for 21 days. Te Pāti denounced the suspensions as an attempt by colonial powers to intimidate Māori. On 5 June, Parliament voted to uphold the suspensions of the three TPM MPs. In response, the party denounced the suspensions with President John Tamihere announcing that the three suspended MPs would be embarking on a national tour to rally opposition against the Government's proposed Regulatory Standards Bill.

On 4 February 2025, Waititi and Ngarewa-Packer proposed the creation of a Parliamentary Commissioner for Te Tiriti o Waitangi, who would have extraordinary powers to audit bills and issue a "Tiriti veto" if policy and bills did not comply with the Treaty. They said this would be a "bottomline" in any coalition negotiations during events leading up to Waitangi Day at the Treaty Grounds. In response, ACT leader Seymour accused Te Pāti Māori of attempting to "break democracy" and urged Labour leader Chris Hipkins to rule out such as policy. Hipkins said he would not support TPM's policy for a Te Tiriti Commissioner with the powers to overturn law but added he was open to ensuring there were better "checks and balances" in New Zealand's constitutional framework.

On 10 April 2025, Te Pāti Māori announced that the party would be standing candidates in general seats at the 2026 New Zealand general election.

On 31 July 2025, the party filed urgent High Court proceedings calling on the Electoral Commission, Ministry of Justice and the Ombudsman to investigate allegations that Māori voters had been removed from the Māori electoral roll or shifted to the general roll without their consent.

On 6 September 2025, Te Pāti Māori's candidate and former broadcaster Oriini Kaipara won a landslide victory in the 2025 Tāmaki Makaurau by-election, retaining the Tāmaki Makaurau electorate for the party. The Tāmaki Makaurau electorate had been vacated by the death of sitting TPM MP Takutai Tarsh Kemp on 26 June 2025.

==== 2025–26 internal conflict ====
In mid-September 2025, the party's Te Tai Tokerau MP Mariameno Kapa-Kingi was replaced as party whip by co-leader Debbie Ngarewa-Packer, with party president John Tamihere alleging that Kapa-Kingi had become detached from her constituents. On 2 October 2025, the Toitū Te Tiriti's leader Eru Kapa-Kingi – the son of Mariameno Kapa-Kingi – confirmed that the group would formally sever relations with Te Pāti Māori, citing concerns about alleged bullying, authoritarian leadership, a clash of values, and the need for independence. In response, Te Pāti Māori rejected allegations of bullying and authoritarian leadership, and claimed that its decision-making process was transparent and compliant with its constitution. On 9 October, the party's co-leaders announced plans to "reset" the party following internal conflict. On 14 October, Te Pāti Māori circulated an internal email to its membership, alleging various indiscretions by both Eru and Mariameno Kapa-Kingi. The email alleged that Eru racially abused a parliamentary security guard, and that Mariameno failed to pay her staffers and exceeded her parliamentary office budget by NZ$133,000. In late October 2025, Waatea News reported that the party's membership had voted to recommend suspending Mariameno and "resetting" the party's Te Tai Tokerau electorate executive.

Between late October and early November 2025, former executive member Amokura Panoho and former vice-president Eru Kapa-Kingi called for John Tamihere's resignation as party president. On 3 November, Tamihere publicly called on Mariameno Kapa-Kingi and Tākuta Ferris, MP for Te Tai Tonga, to resign, claiming that in July 2025 the pair had conspired to oust and replace party leaders Ngarewa-Packer and Waititi. Amidst tensions between the party leadership and Kapa-Kingi and Ferris, the National Iwi Chairs Forum met with Waititi and Ngarewa-Packer on 4 November in an attempt to defuse tensions within the party.

On 9 November, the national council of Te Pāti Māori voted to expel both Mariameno Kapa-Kingi and Ferris. Ferris called the decision "plainly unconstitutional" and Kapa-Kingi said she would appeal. On 11 November, former party co-leader Te Ururoa Flavell questioned the voting process behind the expulsion of the two MPs, citing the exclusion of representatives from Kapa-Kingi's Te Tai Tokerau electorate and the abstention of representatives from the Hauraki-Waikato electorate and Ferris's Te Tai Tonga electorate. On 19 November, former Māori Party MP Hone Harawira called for Kapa-Kingi and Ferris to be reinstated as members and for a national reconciliation tour.

On 4 December 2025, Kapa-Kingi filed an interim injunction at the Wellington High Court challenging Te Pāti Māori's decision to expel her. Her legal team argued that her suspension and expulsion process violated the party's constitution and basic principles of fairness. Key arguments included that no proper disciplinary body had been constituted, that no adequate hearing or notice was provided, and that her membership cancellation process was unfair. The following day, Justice Paul Radich reinstated Kapa-Kingi's membership of the party. However, Radich declined her three other requests, which included removing Tamihere as Te Pāti Māori's president, stopping the party's annual general meeting scheduled for 6–7 December, and preventing the party's national council and executive from passing further resolutions.

Te Pāti Māori's 2025 annual general meeting was held on 7 December at Waiatuhi marae in Rotorua, which was attended by 200 people including Kapa-Kingi. During the AGM, president Tamihere identified the National-led coalition government as the party's enemy. Several speakers including former Kiingitanga spokesperson Ngira Simmonds raised the issue of disunity and infighting within the party, with Simmonds questioning Tamihere, Waititi and Ngarewa-Packer's suitability to lead Te Pāti Māori.

During Waitangi Day on 5 February 2026, Kapa-Kingi used his korero (speech) to question the presence of political parties and the New Zealand Crown on the Waitangi Treaty grounds, and urged Te Pāti Māori to "sort yourselves out". In response, Waititi delivered an address, which Kapa-Kingi regarded as a "half-pai apology." Waititi's wife Kiri Tamihere-Waititi and other Te Pāti Māori sympathizers then delivered a retaliatory haka in challenge. Tamihere-Waiti strode across the marae during said haka and came very close to Kapa-Kingi, which he regarded as a spiritual attack on himself and his family. Kapa-Kingi said the confrontation destroyed all hope of reconciliation with Te Pāti Māori and that he could no longer support them.

On 10 March 2026, Te Pāti Māori stated it would comply with Justice Radich's order to reinstate Kapa-Kingi's party membership, allowing her to participate in party meetings and functions. Despite her court-mandated reinstatement, Stuff reported on 8 May that Kapa-Kingi and Te Pāti Māori were still not working and that she still shared an office space with fellow former TPM MP Ferris. Both of the party's electorate committee in Kapa-Kingi and Ferris's electorates – Te Tai Tokerau and Te Tai Tonga – also resigned and expressed support for Kapa-Kingi and Ferris; depriving the party of the infrastructure needed to select new candidates in those electorates.

On 11 May 2026, Kapa-Kingi announced that she would start her own party called the Te Tai Tokerau Party to contest the 2026 New Zealand general election. The party acknowledged her departure and reiterated its commitment to contesting all seven Māori electorates during the 2026 general election.

==== 2026 general election ====
In January 2026, Te Pāti Māori said that they will campaign on abolishing prisons by 2040 to address the high Māori incarceration rate, replacing them with "community-led and community-based solutions". On 27 May, Te Pāti Māori announced Ngātiwai Trust Board chairman Aperahama Edwards as its candidate for Te Tai Tokerau. In late June 2026, the party's leadership confirmed that they would encourage Māori voters to register for the Māori roll and urged their supporters to give their electorate vote to Te Pāti Māori and their party vote to either Labour or the Greens.

Te Pāti Māori launched its electoral campaign on 16 August. In late August 2026, the party announced its tax policies which included a 48% tax rate on those earning NZ$300,001 and above, a rebate for New Zealanders earning less than NZ$30,000, various wealth, company, land banking and vacant home taxes, and a stamp duty. On 1 September, the party released several constitutional reform policies including establishing an independent "Te Tiriti Commission" to investigate alleged breaches of the Treaty of Waitangi by the New Zealand Crown, making Waitangi Tribunal recommendations legally binding, establishing a 2040 target for constitutional reform and establishing a $200 million Matike Mai Fund to implement these reforms and the United Nations Declaration on the Rights of Indigenous Peoples (UNDRIP). While Labour has ruled out supporting a Te Tiriti Commission and Mātike Mai, the Greens said that Te Pāti Māori's proposed constitutional reforms aligned with its own Treaty of Waitangi policies. NZ First and ACT have denounced these constitutional reform policies as divisive and wasteful.

On 16 September, Te Pāti Māori announced it would create a $1 billion fund to increase Māori and community ownership of new renewable energy assets. On 21 September, the party released its "kai (food) sovereignty" policy; which included allowing Māori collectives to secure Crown and council-owned land, allocating $100 million in seed funding to establish supermarkets, and an income tax food credit policy. On 23 September, the party Māori released its Takatāpui (LGBTQ) policy which involved setting up a $200 million Takatāpui Commission with powers and funding to uplift children. On 4 October, Te Pāti Māori released its party list, which consisted of its Secretary Lance Norman. The party stood seven candidates in the seven Māori electorates.

During the 2026 New Zealand general election held on 7 November, Te Pāti Māori won five of the seven Māori seats and gained 0.57% of the party vote, based on preliminary results. Co-leaders Waititi and Ngarewa-Packer, Hana-Rawhiti Maipi-Clarke and Oriini Kaipara were re-elected while newcomer Aperahama Edwards regained the Te Tai Tokerau electorate from former TPM MP Mariameno Kapa-Kingi.

== Principles and policy ==
The party is committed to advancing what it sees as the rights and interests of the Māori, the indigenous people of New Zealand. Increasingly since the beginning of colonisation, Māori have been marginalised and the group is now a minority within New Zealand alongside Pacific Islanders. Te Pāti Māori policy focuses particularly on affordable housing, Māori recruitment into tertiary institutes and a living wage for all workers, based on the premise that Māori are among the low-socioeconomic communities in New Zealand who are the most economically disadvantaged. During the 2020s, Te Pāti Māori has been widely described as progressive, and further to the political left than Labour by Al Jazeera and Newshub. Previously, during its years in alliance with National, the party had been described as centrist.

The Māori Party was formed in response to the 2004 foreshore and seabed controversy, a debate about whether Māori have legitimate claim to ownership of part or all of New Zealand's foreshore and seabed. The founders of the party believed that:

- Māori owned the foreshore and seabed before British colonisation;
- Te Tiriti o Waitangi made no specific mention of foreshore or seabed;
- No-one has subsequently purchased or otherwise acquired the foreshore or the seabed; and
- Māori should therefore still own the seabed and the foreshore today.

The kaupapa (policy platform) of Te Pāti Māori is based on four principles or pillars:

- Whānau (includes policies regarding affordable housing, strengthening employment-support for Māori beneficiaries and te reo Māori)
- Te Tiriti o Waitangi principles (includes holding the Crown accountable to their obligations under Te Tiriti o Waitangi, and policies on immigration)
- Rangatiratanga (includes policies on climate change in the Pacific and scholarships for Māori and Pasifika education to advance Māori and Pasifika as a collective)
- Kāwanatanga (includes policies on growing iwi economic resources and to protect freshwater as a taonga)

These principles enable Te Pāti Māori to be held accountable for the maintenance and furthering of Māori concepts in the decision-making process. These concepts are not reflected in the traditional Westminster system and Māori customary law is excluded from the New Zealand general legal system. Other Māori-rights-specific party policies have included the upholding of "indigenous values" and compulsory "heritage studies" in schools.

Since 2022 the party has advocated for the abolition of the British monarchy, when the party called for Queen Elizabeth II to be removed as New Zealand's head of state on Waitangi Day. The party advocates for the establishment of a Māori parliament. The party has several policies to ensure Māori ownership of land, including transferring all Crown land to iwi, ending all perpetual leases and establishing a right of first refusal for iwi on all private land.

The party is committed to a mixture of socially progressive and environmentalist policy through a "Titiri-centric" Māori lens. The party is committed to removing Goods and Services Tax from food, opposing deep sea drilling, organising and funding a Māori health authority and reducing homelessness in Māori communities. During the 2026 general election, the party campaigned on abolishing prisons by 2040 in favour of community-led solutions to address the high Māori incarceration rate.

=== Renaming New Zealand ===
In September 2021 the party launched an online petition to change the country's official name to "Aotearoa", and to officially restore Māori-language names for all place names. In its statement is mentioned Article 3 of the Treaty of Waitangi which gave the Māori language equal status with English. By early June 2022, the petition had over 70,000 signatures, and was to be submitted to Parliament's petitions committee. Waititi argued that the change would recognise New Zealand's indigenous heritage and strengthen its identity as a Pacific country. He opposed the idea of a referendum, claiming it would entrench the "tyranny of the majority".

=== Foreign policy issues ===
In May 2021, Te Pāti Māori co-leaders Ngarewa-Packer and Waititi supported Green member of parliament Golriz Ghahraman's push for New Zealand to recognise the State of Palestine. During the Gaza war, Te Pāti Māori advocated expulsion of the Israeli ambassador if Israel did not implement a ceasefire or open a humanitarian corridor in Gaza. Ngarewa-Packer also defended Green MP Chlöe Swarbrick's controversial "From the river to the sea" statement and urged the caretaker Labour Government to call for an "end to war crimes."

== Electoral performance ==
=== House of Representatives ===
Election	Votes	%	Seats		+/–	Position	Status
Election	Votes	%	Māori	Total	+/–	Position	Status
2005	48,263	2.12%	4 / 7	4 / 121	▲4	▲5th	Opposition
2008	55,980	2.39%	5 / 7	5 / 122	▲1	5th	Confidence and supply
2011	31,982	1.43%	3 / 7	3 / 121	▼2	5th	Confidence and supply
2014	31,850	1.32%	1 / 7	2 / 121	▼1	5th	Confidence and supply
2017	30,580	1.18%	0 / 7	0 / 120	▼2	▼7th	No seats
2020	33,632	1.17%	1 / 7	2 / 120	▲2	▲5th	Opposition
2023	87,937	3.08%	6 / 7	6 / 123	▲4	▼6th	Opposition
2026	TBD	TBD	5 / 7	5 / 131	▼1	▼7th	TBD
Source: Electoral Commission

=== Local ===
Election	# of candidates					Winning candidates				
Election	Mayor	Council	Board	Regional council	Total	Mayor	Council	Board	Regional council	Total
2022	–	4	?	1		–	4 / 4	?	1 / 1	
2025	–	3	–	2	5	–	3 / 3	–	2 / 2	5 / 5 100%

== Leadership ==
As of 2020, the constitution of Te Pāti Māori states that it must have two leaders, that its co-leaders must be drawn from its MPs first, and that one must be female and one male. These requirements have been in place since at least 2013.

The party's first leaders were Tariana Turia and Pita Sharples. In December 2012, Turia announced she would resign as party co-leader before the 2014 general election. Te Ururoa Flavell announced his interest in a leadership role, but as the Māori Party constitution required male and female co-leaders, he could not take Turia's place. Shortly after this, in July 2013, Sharples resigned as co-leader, saying he would quit politics altogether come the next general election in 2014. He went on to say that "Our supporters deserve a unified party", which indicated that the leadership tension influenced his decision to resign as party co-leader. Flavell replaced him as the party's male co-leader. In the 2014 general election, Marama Fox became the party's first list MP, and – as the party's only female MP – under the party rules automatically became female co-leader.

Following Rawiri Waititi's successful campaign for Waiariki at the 2020 New Zealand general election, he was confirmed as male co-leader, replacing John Tamihere, at a special general meeting of the Māori Party on 28 October.

Female co-leader						Male co-leader					
	Name	Portrait	Term of office		Parliamentary seat		Name	Portrait	Term of office		Parliamentary seat
1	Tariana Turia		7 July 2004	1 November 2014	Te Tai Hauāuru	1	Pita Sharples		7 July 2004	13 July 2013	Tāmaki Makaurau (from 5 October 2005)
1	Tariana Turia		7 July 2004	1 November 2014	Te Tai Hauāuru	2	Te Ururoa Flavell		13 July 2013	19 July 2018	Waiariki (until 23 September 2017)
2	Marama Fox		1 November 2014	5 September 2018	List MP (until 23 September 2017)	2	Te Ururoa Flavell		13 July 2013	19 July 2018	Waiariki (until 23 September 2017)
Offices vacant 2018–2020
3	Debbie Ngarewa-Packer		15 April 2020	Incumbent	List MP (17 October 2020 – 14 October 2023); Te Tai Hauāuru (since 14 October 2023)	3	John Tamihere		15 April 2020	28 October 2020	—
3	Debbie Ngarewa-Packer		15 April 2020	Incumbent	List MP (17 October 2020 – 14 October 2023); Te Tai Hauāuru (since 14 October 2023)	4	Rawiri Waititi		28 October 2020	Incumbent	Waiariki

The party also has a president:

	Name	Portrait	Term of office	
1	Whatarangi Winiata		2004	2009
2	Pem Bird		2010	2013
3	Naida Glavish		2013	2016
4	Tuku Morgan		2016	2017
5	Che Wilson		2018	2022
6	John Tamihere		2022	present

== See also ==
- Māori politics
- Māori protest movement
- Mana Motuhake
- Treaty of Waitangi claims and settlements
