= Te Ururoa Flavell =

Former New Zealand politician

The Honourable Te Ururoa Flavell
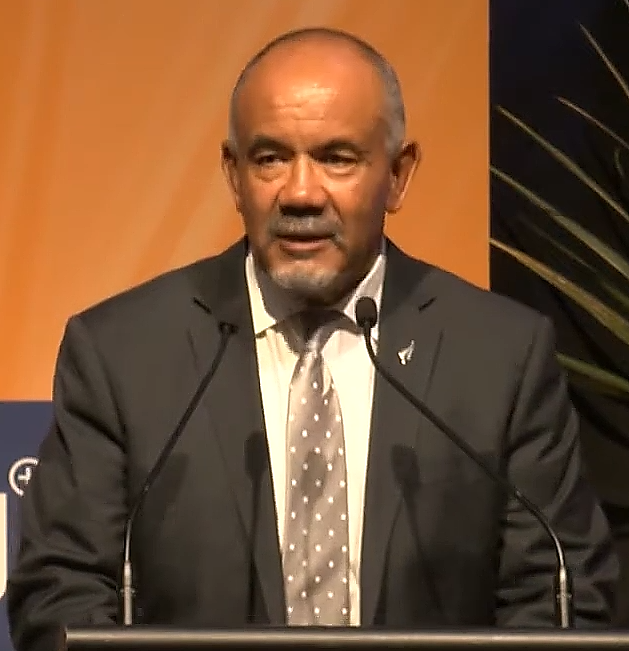
- Flavell in 2017

Member of the New Zealand Parliament for Waiariki
- In office 17 September 2005 – 23 September 2017
- Preceded by: Mita Ririnui
- Succeeded by: Tāmati Coffey

43rd Minister of Māori Development
- In office 8 October 2014 – 21 October 2017
- Prime Minister: John Key; Bill English
- Preceded by: Pita Sharples
- Succeeded by: Nanaia Mahuta

2nd Minister for Whānau Ora
- In office 8 October 2014 – 21 October 2017
- Prime Minister: John Key; Bill English
- Preceded by: Tariana Turia
- Succeeded by: Peeni Henare

3rd Co-leader of the Māori Party
- In office 13 July 2013 – 19 July 2018 Co-leading with Tariana Turia and Marama Fox
- Preceded by: Pita Sharples
- Succeeded by: John Tamihere

Personal details
- Born: 7 December 1955 (age 70) Tokoroa, New Zealand
- Party: Māori Party

Te Ururoa James William Ben Flavell (born 7 December 1955), also known as Hemi Flavell, is a New Zealand politician.

Born in Tokoroa, Flavell was a teacher, principal, and education executive before beginning a political career. He won the Waiariki electorate as a Māori Party candidate in 2005 and held that seat until his electoral defeat in 2017. He was Māori Party co-leader from 2013 until 2018 alongside Dame Tariana Turia and Marama Fox. From 2014 to 2017, the final term of the Fifth National Government, Flavell was Minister for Māori Development and Minister for Whānau Ora.

== Early life and family ==
Flavell was born in Tokoroa to James William Flavell and his fifth wife, Miria (Milly). His iwi (tribal) affiliations are to Ngāpuhi, Ngāti Rangiwewehi, and Te Arawa. Flavell's father died when he was young and he was raised by his single mother at Waiteti, Ngongotahā, north-west of Rotorua. His maternal grandmother was the weaver Ranginui Parewahawaha Leonard.

After attending Sunset Intermediate in Rotorua, Flavell was sent to St Stephen's School, a Māori boys' boarding school, where he learned to speak te reo Māori and was captain of the first XV and head boy. He studied Māori studies and anthropology at the University of Waikato and trained as a teacher. He also has a Master of Arts from the University of Waikato. His thesis, completed in 1986 and written in te reo Māori, is titled Na Tarimo i whakaari... Ko Rangiwewehi te iwi and it collected traditional stories of Flavell's Ngāti Rangiwewehi iwi.

At teacher's college, Flavell met Erana Hond, whom he married. They have five children.

== Career ==
Flavell taught at secondary and tertiary level for many years including as a physical education teacher in Kaikōura and at Fairfield College, Hamilton and Tauhara College, Taupō. He was head of the Māori studies department at Taranaki Polytechnic (now Western Institute of Technology at Taranaki) and established kohanga reo and kura kaupapa with his wife Erana.

In the 1990s, he was principal at St Stephen's, his former school, for three years. It was reported that Flavell tried unsuccessfully to change the school culture to reflect Māori tikanga rather than the hierarchical culture of a traditional English boys' boarding school that his deputy principal later described as being "maintained by violence, or at least the threat of it." Flavell flew the tino rangatiratanga flag on school grounds which the school board did not support. Reports of bullying at the school persisted after Flavell left and it was shuttered in December 2000.

Flavell worked as a consultant to various government agencies before becoming politically active during the foreshore and seabed controversy in 2004. He was an interim co-leader of the Māori Party as it was being established before the co-leadership was taken permanently by Tariana Turia and Pita Sharples. In 2021, he said part of his motivation to enter politics was to support Turia, who had resigned as a Labour Party member of Parliament because of that party's foreshore and seabed reforms.

== Member of Parliament ==
New Zealand Parliament
Years	Term	Electorate	List	Party
2005–2008	48th	Waiariki	10	Māori Party
2008–2011	49th	Waiariki	4	Māori Party
2011–2014	50th	Waiariki	9	Māori Party
2014–2017	51st	Waiariki	1	Māori Party

In the 2005 general election, Flavell stood as a candidate for the Māori Party in the Waiariki electorate and as 10th on the party list. He won the election against the incumbent, Mita Ririnui, and entered Parliament.

The Waiariki electorate was contested by two contenders in the 2008 election: the incumbent and Ririnui. Flavell was once again confirmed.

The Waiariki electorate was contested by three contenders in the 2011 election: Flavell, Annette Sykes of the Mana Party and Louis Te Kani of the Labour Party. Flavell was returned to Parliament for the third successive time.

In the 48th New Zealand Parliament, his primary Māori Party portfolios were Education and Treaty of Waitangi Negotiations. He also held a number of minor portfolios including Tourism, Local Government, Internal Affairs, Sport and Recreation, Land Information and Education Review Office. He was a member and Deputy Chairperson of the Education and Science Select Committee as well as being a current member on the Business Select Committee, Whips Select Committee and Standing Orders Committee.

In July 2007 Flavell's Public Works (Offer Back of and Compensation for Acquired Land) Amendment Bill was drawn from the member's ballot. It passed its first reading and was sent to select committee in early 2009, but was defeated at its second reading in July 2010.

In May 2010 Flavell's Local Electoral (Māori Representation) Amendment Bill was drawn from the member's ballot. It was defeated at its first reading in June.

In September 2010 his Gambling (Gambling Harm Reduction) Amendment Bill was drawn from the member's ballot. It was passed in 2013.

With the resignation as party co-leader of Pita Sharples in July 2013, Flavell was elected as co-leader of the Māori Party. During the 2014 election, Flavell was re-elected in the Waiariki electorate. The Māori Party also won two seats in the House of Representatives with Flavell serving alongside Marama Fox as co-leaders. Between October 2014 and October 2017, Flavell served as the Minister for Māori Development.

During the 2017 election, Flavell lost his seat to Labour candidate Tāmati Coffey. Fellow co-leader Fox also lost her seat, causing the Māori Party to lose its representation in Parliament. Following the party's defeat, Flavell announced his resignation from politics. Fox credited Flavell with successfully lobbying the New Zealand government into recognizing the New Zealand Wars, pardoning Rua Kenana, and ratifying the United Nations Declaration of the Rights of Indigenous Peoples.

=== Attitude towards Treaty settlement ===
Speaking in Māori only at the first reading of the Ngāti Mutunga Treaty Settlement Bill in 2006, Flavell referred to the Crown as thieves. He said that the thieves who had stolen the land had not returned its full value to the iwi and despite it being a legal full and final settlement invited the tribe to return to Parliament in the future to see if the loaf had got bigger. The tribe was returned $14.9 million and 10 areas of significant land to their 2000 members in addition to the various historical payments and the previous return of 24,000 acres.

== Later career ==
Flavell was appointed chief executive of Te Wānanga o Aotearoa in 2018 and resigned from that position in 2021.

== Honours ==
Flavell was awarded an honorary doctorate from the University of Waikato in 2024.

== Personal life ==
Flavell was treated for stage four prostate cancer in 2024.

New Zealand Parliament
Preceded by Mita Ririnui	Member of Parliament for Waiariki; 2005–2017	Succeeded by Tāmati Coffey
Preceded by Pita Sharples	Minister of Māori Development; 2014–2017	Succeeded by Nanaia Mahuta
Preceded by Tariana Turia	Minister for Whānau Ora; 2014–2017	Succeeded by Peeni Henare
Party political offices
Preceded by Pita Sharples	Co-leader of the Māori Party; 2013–2018; Served alongside: Tariana Turia, Marama Fox	Vacant Title next held by John Tamihere
