= 2011 New Zealand general election =

General election in New Zealand

- 26 November 2011

All 121 seats in the House of Representatives, including one overhang seat 61 seats needed for a majority
- Opinion polls
- Registered: 3,070,847
- Turnout: 2,278,989; 74.21% (▼5.25%)
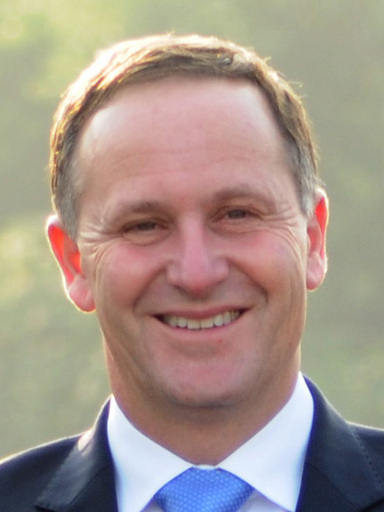

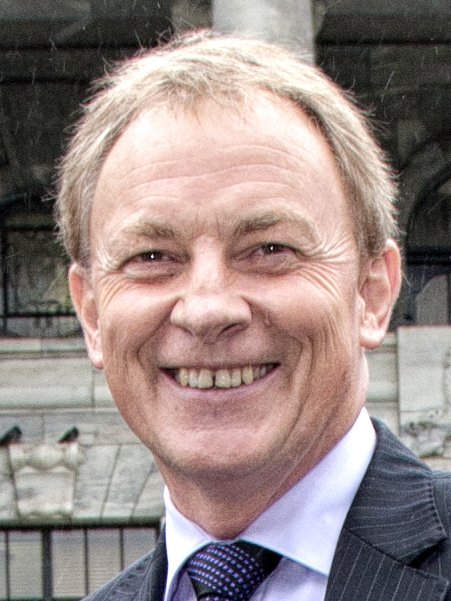

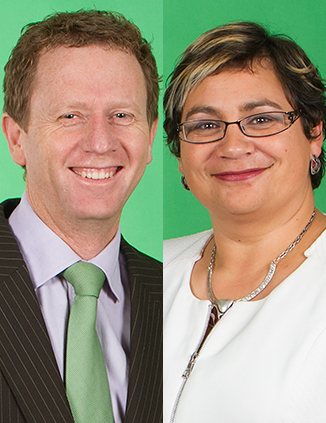

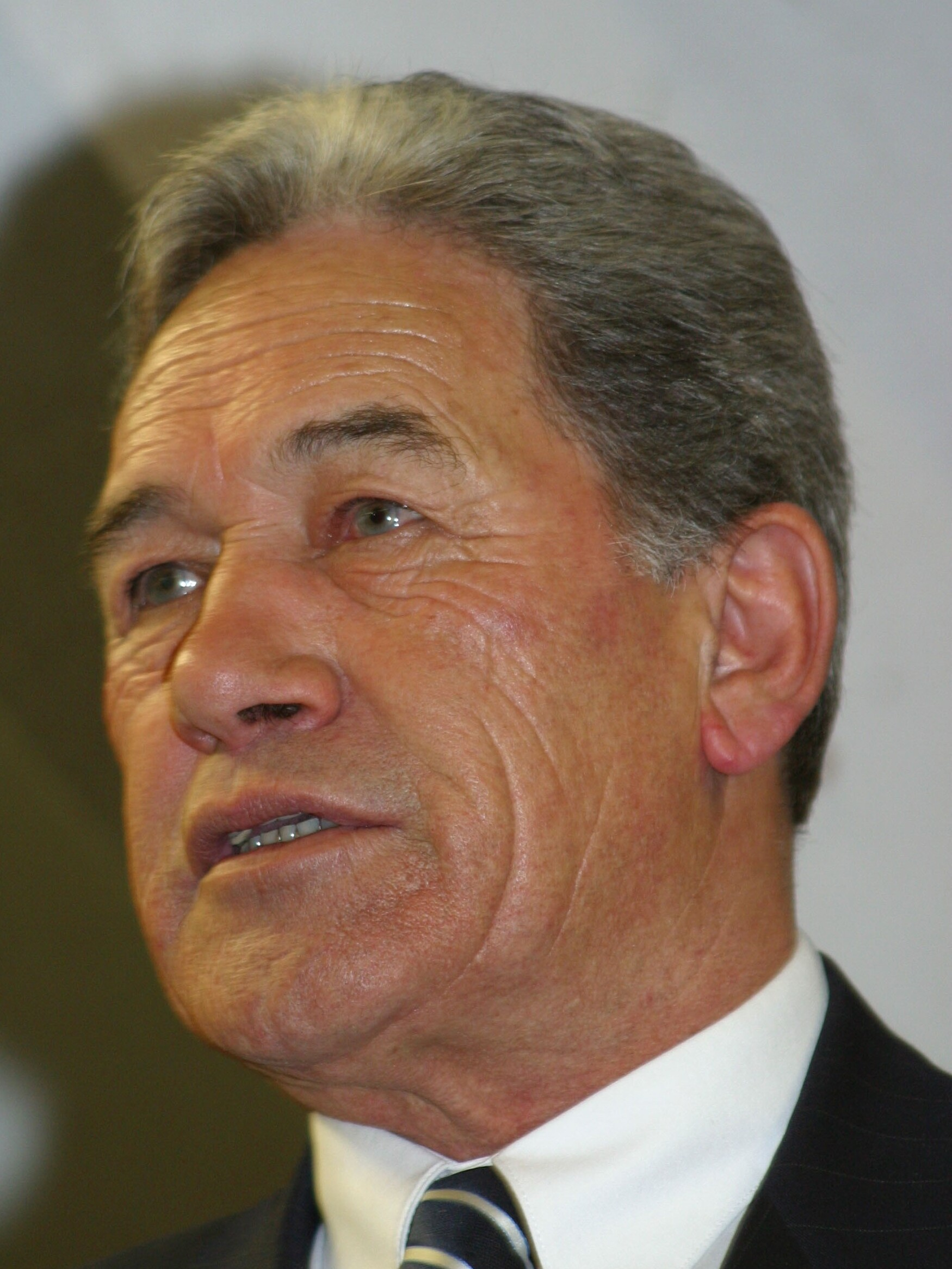

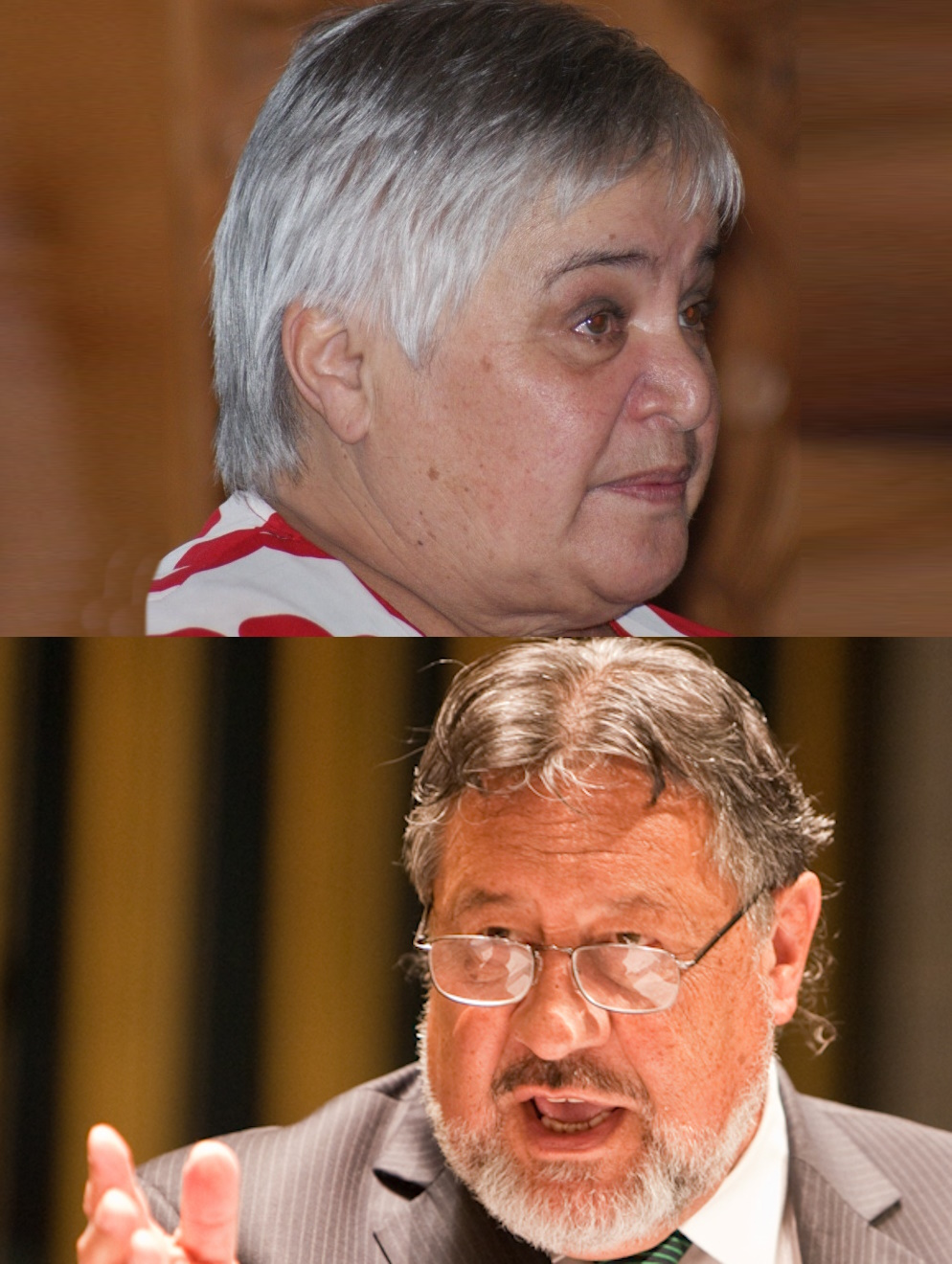

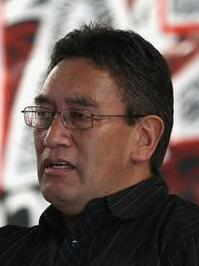

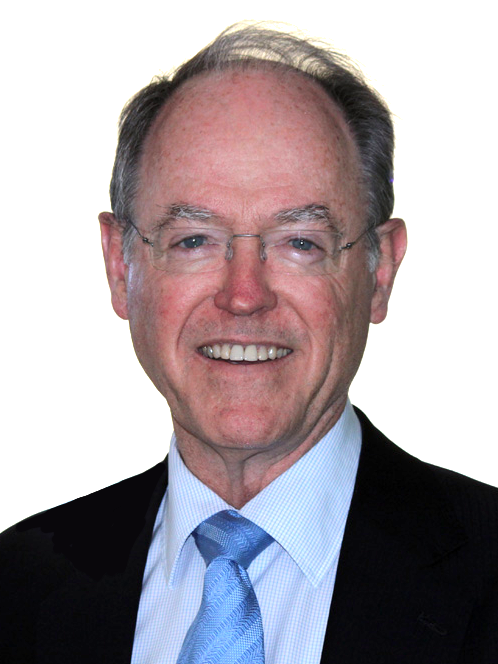

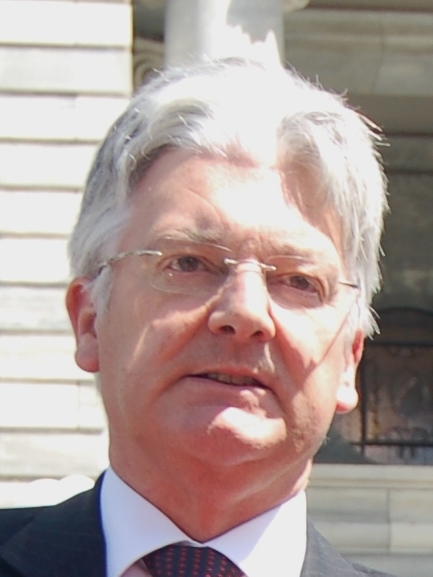
	First party	Second party	Third party
Leader	John Key	Phil Goff	Russel Norman; Metiria Turei
Party	National	Labour	Green
Leader since	27 November 2006	11 November 2008	3 June 2006; 30 May 2009
Leader's seat	Helensville	Mount Roskill	List; List
Last election	58 seats, 44.93%	43 seats, 33.99%	9 seats, 6.72%
Seats before	58	42	9
Seats won	59	34	14
Seat change	▲1	▼9	▲5
Party vote	1,058,638	614,936	247,370
Percentage	47.31%	27.48%	11.06%
Swing	▲2.38 pp	▼6.51 pp	▲4.34 pp
	Fourth party	Fifth party	Sixth party
Leader	Winston Peters	Tariana Turia; Pita Sharples	Hone Harawira
Party	NZ First	Māori Party	Mana
Leader since	18 July 1993	7 July 2004	30 April 2011
Leader's seat	List	Te Tai Hauāuru; Tāmaki Makaurau	Te Tai Tokerau
Last election	0 seats, 4.07%	5 seats, 2.39%	(not yet founded)
Seats before	0	4	1
Seats won	8	3	1
Seat change	▲8	▼1	Steady
Party vote	147,544	31,982	24,168
Percentage	6.59%	1.43%	1.08%
Swing	▲2.52 pp	▼0.96 pp	new
	Seventh party	Eighth party
Leader	Don Brash	Peter Dunne
Party	ACT	United Future
Leader since	28 April 2011	16 November 2000
Leader's seat	Ran in North Shore (lost)	Ōhariu
Last election	5 seats, 3.65%	1 seat, 0.87%
Seats before	5	1
Seats won	1	1
Seat change	▼4	Steady
Party vote	23,889	13,443
Percentage	1.07%	0.60%
Swing	▼2.58 pp	▼0.27 pp
- Results by electorate, shaded by winning margin
Prime Minister and coalition before election
John Key (National)
National (C&S: ACT, Māori, United Future)
Subsequent Prime Minister and coalition
John Key (National)
National (C&S: Māori, ACT, United Future)

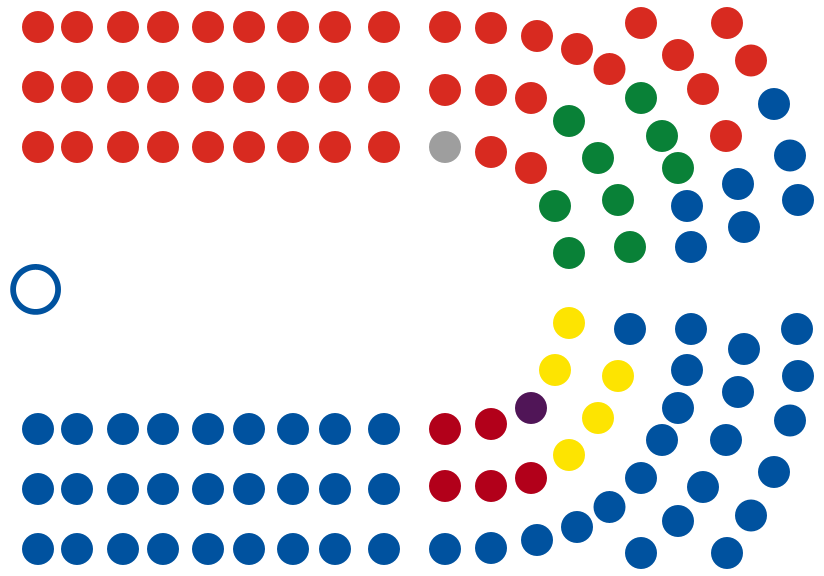
Parliamentary makeup prior to the 2011 election. Government: National (58) Māori (4) ACT (1) United Future (1) Opposition: Labour (42) Green (9) Progressive (1) Mana (1) Independent (1)

The 2011 New Zealand general election was held on 26 November 2011 to determine the membership of the 50th New Zealand Parliament. Voters elected 121 MPs to the New Zealand House of Representatives, 70 from single-member electorates, and 51 from party lists, including one overhang seat. New Zealand has used a mixed-member proportional (MMP) voting system since 1996, giving voters two votes: one for a political party and the other for their local electorate MP. A referendum on the voting system was held at the same time as the election, with voters voting by majority to keep the MMP system. A total of 3,070,847 people were registered to vote in the election, with over 2.2 million votes cast and a turnout of 74.21% – the lowest since 1887.

The incumbent National Party, led by John Key, gained the plurality with 47.3% of the party vote and 59 seats, two seats short of a majority. The opposing Labour Party, led by Phil Goff, lost ground, winning 27.5% of the vote and 34 seats, while the Green Party won 11.1% of the vote and 14 seats – the biggest share of the party vote for a minor party since 1996. New Zealand First, having won no seats in 2008 due to its failure to either reach the 5% threshold or win an electorate, made a comeback with 6.6% of the vote entitling them to eight seats. National's confidence-and-supply partners in the 49th Parliament suffered losses. ACT New Zealand won less than a third of the party vote it received in 2008, reducing from five seats to one. The Māori Party was reduced from five seats to three, as the party vote split between the Māori Party and former Māori Party MP Hone Harawira's Mana Party. United Future lost party votes, but retained their one seat in Parliament.

Following the election, National re-entered confidence-and-supply agreements with ACT and United Future on 5 December 2011, and with the Māori Party on 11 December 2011, to form a minority government with a seven-seat majority (64 seats to 57) and give the Fifth National Government a second term in office.

== Background ==
=== Election date and other key dates ===
The election date was set as Saturday 26 November 2011, as predicted by the media. Breaking with tradition, Prime Minister John Key announced the election date in February. Traditionally, the election date is a closely guarded secret, announced as late as possible. The date follows the tradition of holding the general election on the last Saturday of November unless the schedule is interrupted by a snap election or to circumvent holding a by-election.

The Governor-General must issue writs for an election within seven days of the expiration or dissolution of Parliament. Under section 17 of the Constitution Act 1986, Parliament expires three years "from the day fixed for the return of the writs issued for the last preceding general election of members of the House of Representatives, and no longer." The writs for the previous general election were returnable on 27 November 2008. As a result, the 49th Parliament would have expired, if not dissolved earlier, on 27 November 2011. As that day was a Sunday, the last available working day was 25 November 2011. Consequently, the last day for issuance of writs of election was 2 December 2011. Except in some circumstances (such a recount or the death/incapacitation of an electorate candidate), the writs must be returned within 50 days of their issuance with the last possible working day being 20 January 2012. Because polling day must be a Saturday, the last possible polling date for the election was 7 January 2012, allowing time for the counting of special votes. The Christmas/New Year holiday period made the last realistic date for the election Saturday 10 December 2011. The Rugby World Cup 2011 was hosted by New Zealand between 9 September and 23 October 2011, and ruled out all the possible election dates in this period. This left two possible windows for the general election: on or before 2 September and 29 October to 10 December.

Key dates of the election were:

2 February 2011	Prime Minister John Key announces election to be held on 26 November
6 October 2011	Last sitting day for the 49th Parliament
20 October 2011	Governor-General Jerry Mateparae dissolves the 49th Parliament
26 October 2011	Writ Day – Governor-General issues formal direction to the Electoral Commission to hold the election. Electoral roll closes for printing (all people enrolling after this date must cast special declaration votes).
2 November 2011	Details of candidates for election and polling places released.
9 November 2011	Advance and overseas voting begins.
25 November 2011	Advance voting ends. Overseas voting ends 4:00pm local time.
26 November 2011	Election Day – polling places open 9:00am to 7:00pm. Preliminary results released progressively after 7:00pm.
10 December 2011	Official results released
15 December 2011	Writ for election returned; official declaration of elected members

However, as the recount of the Waitakere was not completed in time for the writ to be returned on 15 December, the return of the writ was delayed to 17 December 2011.

=== 49th Parliament, 2008–2011 ===
In the 2008 general election, the National Party won 58 seats, the Labour Party 43 seats, Green Party 9 seats, ACT and Māori Party five each, and Progressive and United Future one each. Following the election, National Party leader and prime minister John Key announced a confidence-and-supply agreement with ACT, the Māori Party and United Future to form the Fifth National Government, a minority government with a confidence-and-supply majority of 69 in the 122-seat Parliament. Labour, Greens and the Progressives were in opposition, although only the Labour and Progressive parties constituted the Official Opposition; the Greens had a minor agreement with the government, though were not committed to confidence-and-supply support.

During the Parliament session, two members defected from their parties – Chris Carter was expelled from Labour in August 2010, and Hone Harawira left the Māori Party in February 2011. Carter continued as an independent, while Harawira resigned from parliament to recontest his Te Tai Tokerau electorate in a by-election under his newly formed Mana Party. Two MPs resigned from Parliament before the end of the session, John Carter of National and Chris Carter, but as they resigned within six months of an election, their seats remained vacant. At the dissolution of the 49th parliament on 20 October 2011, National held 57 seats, Labour 42 seats, Green 9 seats, ACT 5 seats, Māori 4 seats, and Progressive, United Future and Mana one each.

=== Marginal seats in 2008 ===
At the 2008 election, the following seats were won by a majority of less than 1000 votes:

Electorate	Member of Parliament	Incumbent party	Majority	Second place	Second party
New Plymouth	Jonathan Young	National	105	Harry Duynhoven	Labour
Waimakariri	Clayton Cosgrove	Labour	390	Kate Wilkinson	National
Waitakere	Paula Bennett	National	632	Lynne Pillay	Labour
Rimutaka	Chris Hipkins	Labour	753	Richard Whiteside	National
Hauraki-Waikato	Nanaia Mahuta	Labour	888	Angeline Greensill	Māori Party
Christchurch Central	Brendon Burns	Labour	935	Nicky Wagner	National
West Coast-Tasman	Chris Auchinvole	National	971	Damien O'Connor	Labour

=== MPs retiring in 2011 ===
Nineteen MPs, including all five ACT MPs and the sole Progressive MP, intended to retire at the end of the 49th Parliament. One of the ACT MPs, John Boscawen, contested Tāmaki, but did not expect to win and was not on the party list. National MP Allan Peachey died three weeks before the election.

Party	Name	Electorate
ACT	Roger Douglas	(List)
ACT	Rodney Hide	Epsom
ACT	Heather Roy	(List)
ACT	Hilary Calvert	(List)
ACT	John Boscawen	(List)
Green	Sue Kedgley	(List)
Green	Keith Locke	(List)
Progressive	Jim Anderton	Wigram
Labour	Ashraf Choudhary	(List)
Labour	George Hawkins	Manurewa
Labour	Pete Hodgson	Dunedin North
Labour	Lynne Pillay	(List)
Labour	Mita Ririnui	(List)
National	John Carter	Northland
National	Sandra Goudie	Coromandel
National	Wayne Mapp	North Shore
National	Simon Power	Rangitīkei
National	Allan Peachey	Tāmaki
National	Georgina te Heuheu	(List)

=== Electorate boundaries ===
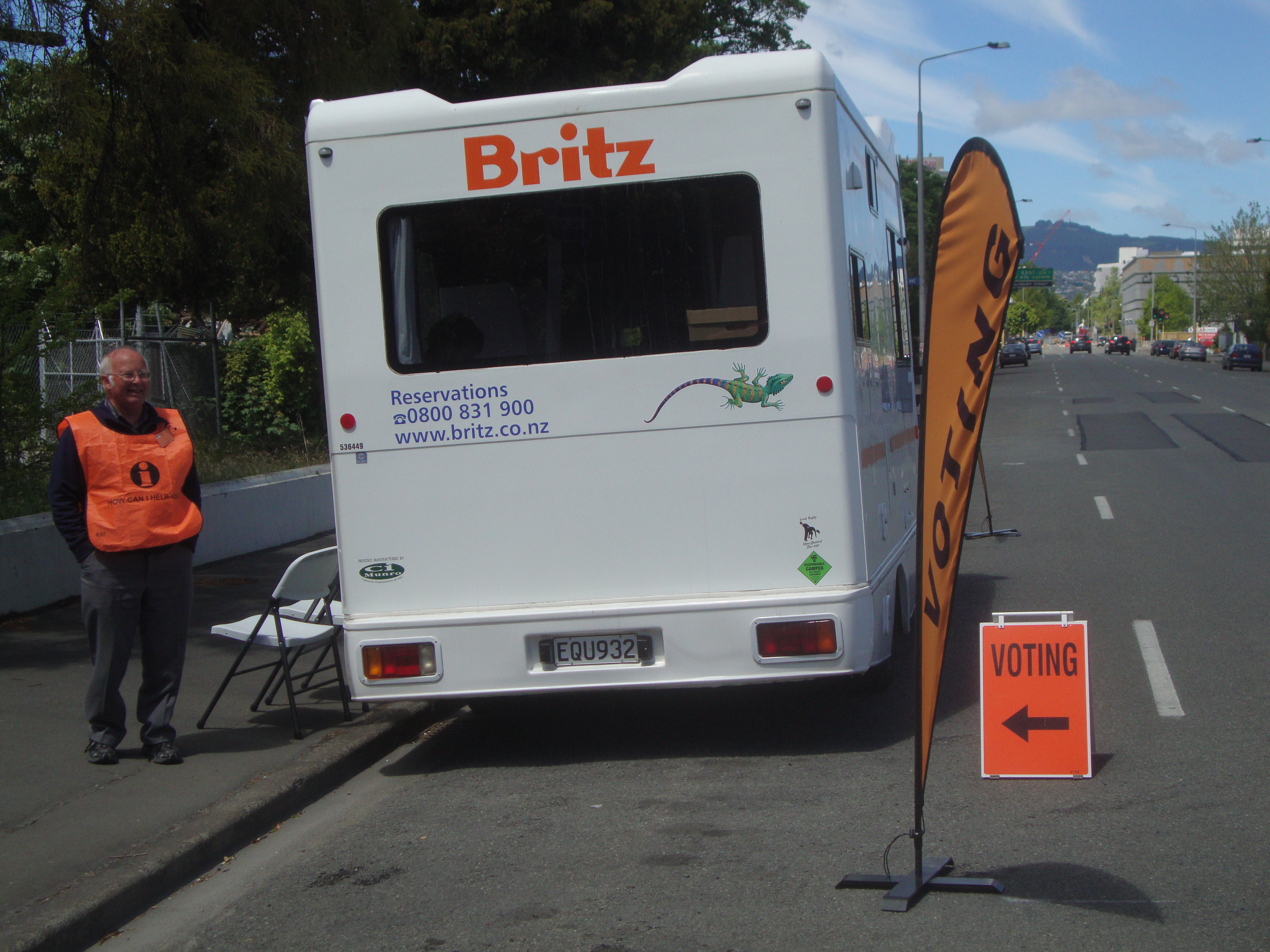
Advance voting in campervans in Christchurch. Campervans were used as many of the polling stations used at previous elections are unavailable due to the 2010 and 2011 earthquakes.

Electorates in the election were the same as at the 2008 election.

Electorates and their boundaries in New Zealand are reviewed every five years after the New Zealand census. The last review took place in 2007, following the 2006 census. The next review is not due until 2014, following the 2013 census (the 2011 census was cancelled due to the 22 February 2011 Christchurch earthquake).

=== Election procedures ===
On 17 September 2010, Justice Minister Simon Power announced the government was introducing legislation making this the first election where voters would be able to re-enrol completely on-line. Enrolments on-line beforehand still required the election form to be printed, signed, and sent by post.

Voters in the Christchurch region were encouraged to cast their votes before election day if they had doubt about being able to get to a polling booth on election day or to avoid long queues, as many traditional polling booths are unavailable due to the earthquakes. Nineteen advance voting stations were made available, with three of them campervans, which are usually only used in rural areas of New Zealand. The Christchurch Central electorate, for example, has 33 polling stations in 2011 compared to 45 in 2008.

== Contesting parties and candidates ==
At the close of nominations, 544 individuals had been nominated to contest the election, down from 682 at the 2008 election. Of those, 91 were list-only, 73 were electorate-only (43 from registered parties, 17 independents, and 13 from non-registered parties), and 380 contested both list and electorate.

Political parties registered with the Electoral Commission on Writ Day can contest the general election as a party, allowing it to submit a party list to contend the party vote, and have a party election expenses limit in addition to individual candidate limits. At Writ Day, sixteen political parties were registered to contend the general election. At the close of nominations, thirteen registered parties had put forward a party list to the commission to contest the party vote, down from nineteen in 2008.

Party	Leader(s)	Party vote % (2008 election)	Seats (October 2011)	Electorate candidates	Party list candidates
Parties with seats in the 49th Parliament
ACT	Rodney Hide	3.65	5	50	55
Green	Russel Norman / Metiria Turei	6.72	9	59	61
Labour	Phil Goff	33.99	42	70	65
Mana	Hone Harawira	–^{[a]}	1	21	20
Māori Party	Pita Sharples / Tariana Turia	2.39	4	11	17
National	John Key	44.93	57	63	65
United Future New Zealand	Peter Dunne	0.87	1	19	15
Other parties
Alliance	Andrew McKenzie / Kay Murray	0.08	–	5	14
Conservative	Colin Craig	–^{[a]}	–	52	30
Democrats	Stephnie de Ruyter	0.05	–	14	24
Legalise Cannabis	Michael Appleby	0.41	–	18	28
Libertarianz	Richard McGrath	0.05	–	9	27
NZ First	Winston Peters	4.07	–	31	33
^[a] Party was founded after the 2008 election

The Kiwi Party, the New Citizen Party and the Progressive Party were registered, but did not contend the election under their own banners. The Kiwi Party and the New Citizen Party stood candidates for the Conservative Party.

In addition to the registered parties and their candidates, thirteen candidates from nine non-registered parties contested electorates. The Human Rights Party contested Auckland Central, the Communist League Manukau East and Mount Roskill, the Nga Iwi Morehu Movement contested Hauraki-Waikato and Te Tai Hauauru, the Pirate Party contested Hamilton East and Wellington Central, the Sovereignty Party contested Clutha-Southland and Te Tai Hauauru, Economic Euthenics contested Wigram, New Economics contested Wellington Central, Restore All Things In Christ contested Dunedin South, and the Youth Party contested West Coast-Tasman.

Seventeen independent candidates also contested the electorates in thirteen electorates: Christchurch Central, Coromandel, Epsom (two), Hamilton West (two), New Plymouth, Ōtaki, Rangitikei (two), Rongotai, Tāmaki (two), Tauranga, Waitaki, Wellington Central, and Ikaroa-Rawhiti

== Campaigning ==
=== Epsom and the Tea Tape scandal ===
On 11 November, National Party leader John Key met with John Banks, the ACT candidate for Epsom, over a cup of tea at a cafe in Newmarket to send a signal to Epsom voters about voting tactically. The National Party passively campaigned for Epsom voters to give their electorate vote to ACT while giving their party vote to National. This would allow ACT to bypass the 5% party vote threshold and enter Parliament by winning an electorate seat, thereby providing a coalition partner for National. However, in October and November 2011, polls of the Epsom electorate vote taken by various companies showed that the National candidate for Epsom, Paul Goldsmith, was leading in the polls and likely to win the seat. During the meeting, the two politicians' discussion was recorded by a device left on the table in a black pouch. The recording tapes were leaked to The Herald on Sunday newspaper, and subsequently created a media frenzy over the content of the unreleased tapes.

=== Debates ===
TVNZ held three party leaders' debates: two between the Prime Minister and the Leader of the Opposition, and one between the leaders of the smaller parties. TV3 hosted a single debate between the Prime Minister and the Leader of the Opposition.

Date	Host	Leaders	Presenter / Moderator
30 October	TVNZ	Don Brash, Metiria Turei, Hone Harawira, Pita Sharples, Peter Dunne	Paul Holmes
Highlights – The debate included a variety of topics, ranging from the age of superannuation eligibility to youth unemployment to asset sales. Peter Dunne won the debate, with Metiria Turei coming second.
31 October	TVNZ	John Key, Phil Goff	Mark Sainsbury / Guyon Espiner
Highlights – The economy, asset sales, the cost of living, education, welfare, environment and mining, crisis management and recovery, leadership and New Zealand's involvement in Afghanistan. A text poll conducted alongside gave the debate to John Key with 61%.
16 November	TVNZ	Don Brash, Russel Norman, Hone Harawira, Tariana Turia, Winston Peters, Peter Dunne	Mark Sainsbury / Guyon Espiner
Highlights – The debate included the economy, the age of superannuation eligibility, Māori affairs, the environment, the Emissions Trading Scheme, the Tea Tape scandal, the voting system referendum, and potential partners after the election. A text poll conducted alongside gave the debate to Winston Peters with 36%, with Hone Harawira coming second with 27%.
21 November	TV3	John Key, Phil Goff	John Campbell
Highlights – A studio audience of undecided voters gave positive or negative reactions to the leaders, which showed up on a reactor worm. Aside from claims that the studio audience was biased, Phil Goff won the debate.
23 November	TVNZ	John Key, Phil Goff	Mark Sainsbury / Guyon Espiner
Highlights – to be completed

=== Pre-election coalition preferences ===
The National Party ruled out working with New Zealand First's Winston Peters after the election. ACT confirmed it would work with National after the elections.

The Labour Party leader Phil Goff ruled out a coalition agreement with Hone Harawira's new Mana Party, but left open the possibility of reaching an agreement with New Zealand First.

In the 16 November minor parties debate, leaders from the minor parties stated their preferences:

- The Green's preference was it would work in a coalition government with Labour, but wouldn't completely rule out working with National.
- Mana would not work in a coalition government with National and/or ACT
- Māori would not work in a coalition government with ACT.
- No preference was stated for New Zealand First, but later said it would not work with National or Labour.
- United Future ruled out working with Labour

=== Media bias ===
A Massey University study released in November 2012 suggested newspaper coverage was favourable towards National and John Key. In the month leading up to the election, the big four newspapers in New Zealand – The New Zealand Herald, The Herald on Sunday, The Dominion Post and The Sunday Star-Times – printed 72 percent more photos of Key than his opponent, Phil Goff, and devoted twice as many column inches of text coverage.

== Opinion polling ==
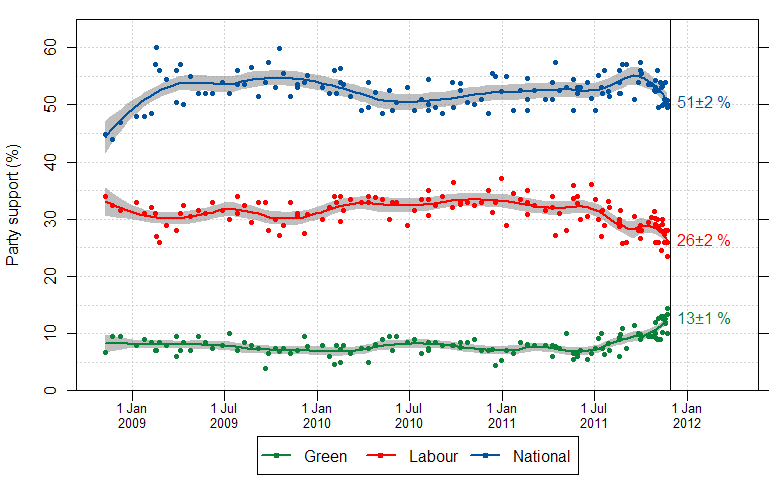
Graphical representation of poll results

The nature of the Mixed Member Proportional voting system, whereby the share of seats in Parliament a party gets is determined by its share of the nationwide party vote, means aside from normal polling bias and error, opinion polling in New Zealand is fairly accurate in predicting the outcome of an election compared with other countries.

Opinion polls were undertaken periodically since the 2008 election by MediaWorks New Zealand (3 News Reid Research), The New Zealand Herald (Herald Digipoll), Roy Morgan Research, and Television New Zealand (One News Colmar Brunton), with polls having also being conducted by Fairfax Media (Fairfax Media Research International) since July 2011. The graph on the right shows the collated results of all five polls for parties that have polled above the 5% electoral threshold.

After the 2008 election, National gained in popularity, and since 2009 has regularly polled in the 50–55% range, peaking at 55% in August 2009 and October 2011, before falling to 51% in the week before the election. Labour and Green meanwhile kept steady after the election at 31–34% and 7–8% respectively until July 2011, when Labour started to lose support, falling to just 26% before the election. The majority of Labour's loss was the Green's gain, rising to 13% in the same period. No other party peaked on average above 5% in the period.

== Results ==
=== Parliamentary parties ===
Party vote percentage
1. National (47.3%)
2. Labour (27.5%)
3. Green (11.1%)
4. NZ First (6.59%)
5. Conservative (2.65%)
6. Māori (1.43%)
7. Mana (1.08%)
8. ACT (1.07%)
9. United Future (0.60%)
10. Other (0.73%)

Seating diagram, after 2011 election

Summary of the 26 November 2011 election for the House of Representatives
Party	Party vote			Electorate vote			Seats			
Party	Votes	%	Change (pp)	Votes	%	Change (pp)	List	Electorate	Total	+/-
National	1,058,636	47.31	▲2.38	1,027,696	47.31	▲0.71	17	42	59	▲1
Labour	614,937	27.48	▼6.50	762,897	35.12	▼0.10	12	22	34	▼9
Green	247,372	11.06	▲4.33	155,492	7.16	▲1.53	14	0	14	▲5
NZ First	147,544	6.59	▲2.53	39,892	1.84	▲0.15	8	0	8	▲8
Māori Party	31,982	1.43	▼0.96	39,320	1.81	▼1.53	0	3	3	▼2
Mana	24,168	1.08	new	29,872	1.38	new	0	1	1	new
ACT	23,889	1.07	▼2.58	31,001	1.43	▼1.56	0	1	1	▼4
United Future	13,443	0.60	▼0.27	18,792	0.87	▼0.26	0	1	1	Steady
Conservative	59,237	2.65	new	51,678	2.38	new	0	0	0	new
Legalise Cannabis	11,738	0.52	▲0.12	6,384	0.29	▲0.12	0	0	0	Steady
Democrats	1,714	0.08	▲0.03	2,255	0.10	▲0.02	0	0	0	Steady
Libertarianz	1,595	0.07	▲0.02	1,459	0.07	▼0.01	0	0	0	Steady
Alliance	1,209	0.05	▼0.03	1,245	0.06	▼0.02	0	0	0	Steady
Unregistered parties	—	—	—	1,557	0.07	▲0.01	—		0	Steady
Independent	—	—	—	2,894	0.13	▼0.40	—		0	Steady
Valid votes	2,237,464	98.18	▼0.48	2,172,434	95.32	▼1.47				
Informal votes	19,872	0.87	▲0.37	53,332	2.34	▲1.27				
Disallowed votes	21,653	0.95	▲0.11	53,223	2.34	▲0.20				
Below electoral threshold	75,493	3.31		—	—	—				
Total	2,278,989	100		2,278,989	100		51	70	121	▼1
Eligible voters and Turnout	3,070,847	74.21	▼5.25	3,070,847	74.21	▼5.25				

=== Votes summary ===
Constituency Vote
National	47.31%
Labour	35.12%
Green	7.16%
Conservative	2.38%
NZ First	1.84%
Māori	1.81%
ACT	1.43%
Mana	1.38%
United Future	0.87%
Others	0.70%

Party Vote
National	47.31%
Labour	27.48%
Green	11.06%
NZ First	6.59%
Conservative	2.65%
Māori	1.43%
Mana	1.08%
ACT	1.07%
United Future	0.60%
Others	0.73%

Parliament seats
National	48.76%
Labour	28.09%
Green	11.57%
NZ First	6.61%
Māori	2.47%
Mana	0.83%
ACT	0.83%
United Future	0.83%

=== Electorate results ===
Party affiliation of winning electorate candidates.

Prior to the election, the National Party held the majority of the electorate seats with 41. Labour held 20 seats, Māori held four seats, and ACT, Mana, Progressive, United Future and an ex-Labour independent held one seat each.

After the election, National gained one seat to hold 42 seats, Labour gained three seats to hold 23 electorates, Māori lost one seat to hold three, and ACT, Mana, and United Future held steady with one seat each. A National or Labour candidate took second place in all the general electorates except Rodney, where it was Conservative Party leader Colin Craig.

In eleven electorates, the incumbents did not seek re-election, and new MPs were elected. In Coromandel, North Shore, Northland, Rangitikei, Rodney and Tāmaki, the seats were passed from incumbent National MPs to new National MPs; in Epsom, the seat was passed from the incumbent ACT MP to the new ACT MP; and in Dunedin North and Manurewa, the seats were passed from incumbent Labour MPs to new Labour MPs. Labour also won Te Atatū from the retiring ex-Labour independent, and Wigram from the retiring Progressive MP.

Of the 59 seats where the incumbent sought re-election, four changed hands. In West Coast-Tasman, Labour's Damien O'Connor regained the seat from National's Chris Auchinvole, who defeated him for the seat in 2008. In Waimakariri, National's Kate Wilkinson defeated Labour MP Clayton Cosgrove, and in Te Tai Tonga, Labour's Rino Tirikatene defeated Maori Party MP Rahui Katene. Christchurch Central on election night ended with incumbent Labour MP Brendon Burns and National's Nicky Wagner tied on 10,493 votes each, and on official counts, swung to Nicky Wagner with a 45-vote majority, increasing to 47 votes on a judicial recount. Despite losing their electorate seats, Chris Auchinvole and Clayton Cosgrove were re-elected into parliament via the party list.

On election night, Waitakere was won by incumbent National MP Paula Bennett with a 349-vote majority over Labour's Carmel Sepuloni. On official counts, it swung to Sepuloni with a majority of 11 votes, and Bennett subsequently requested a judicial recount, and on the recount, the seat swung back to Bennett with a majority of nine votes. Bennett was declared elected, and Sepuloni was not returned via the party list due to her list ranking, being replaced in the Labour caucus with Raymond Huo.

Five electorates returned with the winner having a majority of less than one thousand – Waitakere (9), Christchurch Central (47), Waimakariri (642), Auckland Central (717) and Tāmaki Makaurau (936).

The table below shows the results of the 2011 general election:

Key:

National	Labour	NZ First	ACT
United Future	Māori Party	Mana Party	Conservative

Electorate results of the 2011 New Zealand general election
Electorate	Incumbent	Winner	Majority	Runner up
Auckland Central	Nikki Kaye		717	Jacinda Ardern
Bay of Plenty	Tony Ryall		17,760	Carol Devoy-Heena
Botany	Pansy Wong	Jami-Lee Ross	10,741	Chao-Fu Wu
Christchurch Central	Brendon Burns	Nicky Wagner	47	Brendon Burns
Christchurch East	Lianne Dalziel		5,334	Aaron Gilmore
Clutha-Southland	Bill English		16,168	Tat Loo
Coromandel	Sandra Goudie	Scott Simpson	12,740	Hugh Kininmonth
Dunedin North	Pete Hodgson	David Clark	3,489	Michael Woodhouse
Dunedin South	Clare Curran		4,175	Jo Hayes
East Coast	Anne Tolley		4,774	Moana Mackey
East Coast Bays	Murray McCully		14,641	Vivienne Goldsmith
Epsom	Rodney Hide	John Banks	2,261	Paul Goldsmith
Hamilton East	David Bennett		8,275	Sehai Orgad
Hamilton West	Tim Macindoe		4,418	Sue Moroney
Helensville	John Key		21,066	Jeremy Greenbrook-Held
Hunua	Paul Hutchison		16,797	Richard Hills
Hutt South	Trevor Mallard		4,825	Paul Quinn
Ilam	Gerry Brownlee		13,312	John Parsons
Invercargill	Eric Roy		6,263	Lesley Soper
Kaikōura	Colin King		11,445	Liz Collyns
Mana	Kris Faafoi		2,230	Hekia Parata
Māngere	William Sio		15,159	Claudette Hauiti
Manukau East	Ross Robertson		15,838	Kanwaljit Singh Bakshi
Manurewa	George Hawkins	Louisa Wall	8,610	Cam Calder
Maungakiekie	Sam Lotu-Iiga		3,021	Carol Beaumont
Mt Albert	David Shearer		10,021	Melissa Lee
Mt Roskill	Phil Goff		7,271	Jackie Blue
Napier	Chris Tremain		3,701	Stuart Nash
Nelson	Nick Smith		7,088	Maryan Street
New Lynn	David Cunliffe		5,190	Tim Groser^{†}
New Plymouth	Jonathan Young		4,270	Andrew Little^{†}
North Shore	Wayne Mapp	Maggie Barry	15,228	Ben Clark
Northcote	Jonathan Coleman		9,379	Paula Gillon
Northland	John Carter	Mike Sabin	11,362	Lynette Stewart
Ōhariu	Peter Dunne		1,392	Charles Chauvel
Ōtaki	Nathan Guy		5,231	Peter Foster
Pakuranga	Maurice Williamson		13,846	Sunny Kaushal
Palmerston North	Iain Lees-Galloway		3,285	Leonie Hapeta
Papakura	Judith Collins		9,890	Jerome Mika
Port Hills	Ruth Dyson		3,097	David Carter^{†}
Rangitata	Jo Goodhew		6,537	Julian Blanchard
Rangitīkei	Simon Power	Ian McKelvie	9,382	Josie Pagani
Rimutaka	Chris Hipkins		3,286	Jonathan Fletcher
Rodney	Lockwood Smith	Mark Mitchell	12,222	Colin Craig
Rongotai	Annette King		9,047	Chris Finlayson^{†}
Rotorua	Todd McClay		7,357	Steve Chadwick
Selwyn	Amy Adams		19,451	Jo Mclean
Tāmaki	Allan Peachey	Simon O'Connor	17,786	Nick Iusitini Bakulich
Taranaki-King Country	Shane Ardern		15,089	Rick Barker
Taupō	Louise Upston		14,115	Frances Campbell
Tauranga	Simon Bridges		17,264	Deborah Mahuta-Coyle
Te Atatū	Chris Carter	Phil Twyford	5,416	Tau Henare^{†}
Tukituki	Craig Foss		9,660	Julia Haydon-Carr
Waikato	Lindsay Tisch		14,198	Kate Sutton
Waimakariri	Clayton Cosgrove	Kate Wilkinson	642	Clayton Cosgrove^{†}
Wairarapa	John Hayes		7,135	Michael Bott
Waitakere	Paula Bennett		9	Carmel Sepuloni
Waitaki	Jacqui Dean		14,143	Barry Monks
Wellington Central	Grant Robertson		6,376	Paul Foster-Bell
West Coast-Tasman	Chris Auchinvole	Damien O'Connor	2,539	Chris Auchinvole^{†}
Whanganui	Chester Borrows		5,046	Hamish McDouall
Whangarei	Phil Heatley		12,447	Pat Newman
Wigram	Jim Anderton	Megan Woods	1,500	Sam Collins
Māori Electorates
Hauraki-Waikato	Nanaia Mahuta		5,935	Angeline Greensill
Ikaroa-Rāwhiti	Parekura Horomia		6,541	Na Raihania
Tāmaki Makaurau	Pita Sharples		936	Shane Jones
Te Tai Hauāuru	Tariana Turia		3,221	Soraya Peke-Mason
Te Tai Tokerau	Hone Harawira		1,165	Kelvin Davis
Te Tai Tonga	Rahui Katene	Rino Tirikatene	1,475	Rahui Katene
Waiariki	Te Ururoa Flavell		1,883	Annette Sykes

- ^† These people entered Parliament at the election as list MPs

Notes

^† These people subsequently entered Parliament at the election as list MPs

=== List results ===
Highest polling party in each electorate.

The election was notable for the entry in Parliament of New Zealand's first ever profoundly deaf MP, Mojo Mathers, number 14 on the Green Party's list.

National	Labour	Green	NZ First
Lockwood Smith (03); Chris Finlayson (09); David Carter (10); Tim Groser (12); Steven Joyce (13); Hekia Parata (18); Michael Woodhouse (31); Melissa Lee (34); Kanwal Singh Bakshi (35); Jian Yang (36); Alfred Ngaro (37); Katrina Shanks (38); Paul Goldsmith (39); Tau Henare (40); Chris Auchinvole (43); Jackie Blue (46); Cam Calder (50)	David Parker (04); Maryan Street (07); Clayton Cosgrove (08); Sue Moroney (10); Charles Chauvel (11); Jacinda Ardern (13); Andrew Little (15); Shane Jones (16); Darien Fenton (18); Moana Mackey (19); Rajen Prasad (20); Raymond Huo (21)	Metiria Turei (01); Russel Norman (02); Kevin Hague (03); Catherine Delahunty (04); Kennedy Graham (05); Eugenie Sage (06); Gareth Hughes (07); David Clendon (08); Jan Logie (09); Steffan Browning (10); Denise Roche (11); Holly Walker (12); Julie Anne Genter (13); Mojo Mathers (14)	Winston Peters (01); Tracey Martin (02); Andrew Williams (03); Richard Prosser (04); Barbara Stewart (05); Brendan Horan (06); Denis O'Rourke (07); Asenati Taylor (08)

==== Unsuccessful list candidates ====
National	Aaron Gilmore*, Paul Quinn, Paul Foster-Bell*, Claudette Hauiti*, Jo Hayes*, Leonie Hapeta, Sam Collins, Jonathan Fletcher, Heather Tanner, Denise Krum, Carolyn O'Fallon, Viv Gurrey, Karen Rolleston, Brett Hudson, Linda Cooper, Karl Varley
Labour	Carol Beaumont*, Kelvin Davis*, Carmel Sepuloni, Rick Barker, Deborah Mahuta-Coyle, Stuart Nash, Brendon Burns, Michael Wood, Steve Chadwick, Kate Sutton, Jerome Mika, Josie Pagani, Lynette Stewart, Jordan Carter, Christine Rose, Glenda Alexander, Susan Zhu, Sehai Orgad, Mea'ole Keil, Richard Hills, Anahila Suisuiki, Hamish McDouall, Louis Te Kani, Tat Loo, Soraya Peke-Mason, Julian Blanchard, Peter Foster, Pat Newman, Julia Haydon-Carr, Michael Bott, Vivienne Goldsmith, Nick Bakulich, Chris Yoo, Barry Monks, Hugh Kininmonth, Jo Kim, Paula Gillon, Carol Devoy-Heena, Ben Clark, Chao-Fu Wu
Green	James Shaw, David Hay, Richard Leckinger, Aaryn Barlow, Jeanette Elley, Sea Rotmann, Michael Gilchrist, Dora Langsbury, David Kennedy, Tane Woodley, Joseph Burston, Mikaere Curtis, Shane Gallagher, Saffron Toms, Stephen Tollestrup, Zachary Dorner, Paul Bailey, Rick Bazeley, Maree Brannigan, Caroline Conroy, Sue Coutts, Pauline Evans, Rachael Goldsmith, Cameron Harper, John Kelcher, Alex Kruize, Tom Land, Gerrie Ligtenberg, Jim MacDonald, Nick Marryatt, Zane McCarthy, Jack McDonald, Ian McLean, John Milnes, Darryl Monteith, Robert Moore, Teresa Moore, David Moorhouse, Todd Ross, Brett Stansfield, Geoff Steedman, Gary Stewart, Vernon Tava, Corrina Tucker, Pieter Watson, Charmaine Watts, Richard Wesley
NZ First	Helen Mulford, Hugh Barr, Fletcher Tabuteau, Pita Paraone, Brent Catchpole, Ben Craven, Jerry Ho, Bill Gudgeon, Kevin Gardener, Ray Dolman, David Scott, Randall Ratana, Mahesh Bindra, Edwin Perry, Dion Jelley, John Hall, Kevin Stone, Doug Nabbs, Brett Pierson, Olivia Ilalio, Gordon Stewart, Tamati Reid, Ian Brougham, Bill Woods, Allen Davies
Conservative	Colin Craig, Kathy Sheldrake, Larry Baldock, Fa'avae Gagamoe, Brian Dobbs, Roy Brown, Simonne Dyer, Simon Kan, Litia Simpson, Kevin Campbell, Paul Young, Leighton Baker, Feleti Key, Claire Holley, Frank John Naea, Frank Poching, Jesse Misa, Bob Daw, Lance Gedge, Robyn Jackson, Pat Gregory, Timothy de Vries, Melanie Taylor, Cynthia Liu, Craig Jensen, Oliver Vitali, Danny Mountain, Ivan Bailey, Brent Reid, Michael Cooke
Māori Party	Waihoroi Shortland, Kaapua Smith, Wheturangi Walsh-Tapiata, Tina Porou, Awanui Black, Davina Murray, Josie Peita, Paora Te Hurihanganui, Fallyn Flavell, Daryl Christie, Tom Phillips, Tim Morrison, Tamai Nicholson, Aroha Rickus
ACT	Don Brash, Catherine Isaac, Don Nicolson, David Seymour, Chris Simmons, Stephen Whittington, Kath McCabe, Robyn Stent, John Thompson, John Ormond, Lyn Murphy, Kevin Moratti, Robin Grieve, Pratima Nand, Dominic Costello, Toni Severin, Richard Evans, Ian Cummings, Gareth Veale, Toby Hutton, Daniel Stratton, Robert Burnside, Hayden Fitzgerald, Alex Speirs, Peter McCaffrey, Shane Atkinson, Allan Birchfield, Robin Boom, Stephen Boyle, Barry Brill, Ian Carline, Tom Corbett, Casey Costello, Alwyn Courtenay, Alan Daniel Davidson, Kimberly Hannah, Beth Houlbrooke, Paul Hufflett, Rosanne Jollands, Nick Kearney, Tim Kronfeld, Joel Latimer, Jonathan Macfarlane, Garry Mallett, Guy McCallum, Colin Nicholls, John Norvill, David Peterson, James Read, Geoff Russell, Andrew Sharrock, Barbara Steinijans, Michael Warren, Vince Ashworth
United Future New Zealand	Doug Stevens, Rob Eaddy, Sultan Eusoff, Alan Simmons, Bryan Mockridge, Vanessa Roberts, Pete George, Ram Prakash, Martin Gibson, Clyde Graf, Damian Light, Andrew McMillan, Diane Brown, Brian Carter, Johnny Miller, Ian Gaskin
Mana	Annette Sykes, John Minto, Sue Bradford, Misty Harrison, James Papali’i, Tawhai McClutchie, Angeline Greensill, Jayson Gardiner, Richard Shortland Cooper, Peter Cleave, Val Irwin, Sharon Stevens, Keriana Reedy, Pat O'Dea, Rod Paul, Grant Rogers, Te Nguha Huirama-Patuwai, Barry Tumai, Ngawai Herewini
Legalise Cannabis	Michael Appleby, Michael Britnell, Maki Herbert, Julian Crawford, Jeff Lye, Jasmin Hewlett, Emma-Jane Mihaere-Kingi, Steven Wilkinson, Richard Goode, Fred MacDonald, Leo Biggs, Jay Fitton, Romana Manning, Geoff McTague, Jamie Dombroski, Christine Mitchell, Dwayne Sherwood, Abe Gray, Sean Norris, Adrian McDermott, Philip Pophristoff, Neville Yates, Mark Bradford, Blair Anderson, Kevin O'Connell, Paula Lambert, Irinka Britnell, Paul McMullan
Democrats	Stephnie de Ruyter, John Pemberton, Warren Voight, Katherine Ransom, Carolyn McKenzie, Hessel van Wieren, Heather Smith, Jeremy Noble, Barry Pulford, John McCaskey, Huia Mitchell, Ken Goodhue, Les Port, Robert Mills, Harry Alchin-Smith, Errol Baird, Peter Adcock-White, John Ring, Kelly Balsom, David Espin, Ross Hayward, Gary Gribben, Ron England, David Tranter
Libertarianz	Richard McGrath, Sean Fitzpatrick, Peter Cresswell, Reagan Cutting, Peter Osborne, Michael Murphy, Shane Pleasance, Robert Palmer, Bernard Darnton, Helen Hughes, Colin Cross, Nik Haden, Luke Howison, Phil Howison, Andrew Couper, Mike Webber, Bruce Whitehead, Donald Rowberry, Ken Riddle, Peter Linton, Allan Munro, Ian Hayes, Shirley Riddle, Callum McPetrie, Elahrairah Zamora, Euan McPetrie, Mitch Lees
Alliance	Kay Murray, Andrew McKenzie, Kevin Campbell, Jim Flynn, Paul Piesse, Victor Billot, Mary O'Neill, Kelly Buchanan, Robert van Ruyssevelt, Jen Olsen, Tom Dowie, Thomas O'Neill, Eunice Billot, Norman MacRitchie

Notes

1. These party list members would eventually enter parliament in the term as other list MPs elected resigned from parliament.
2. These party list members have since resigned.

=== Changes in MPs ===
In total, 25 new MPs were elected to Parliament, and three former MPs returned.

New MPs: Scott Simpson, Maggie Barry, Mike Sabin, Ian McKelvie, Mark Mitchell, Simon O'Connor, Alfred Ngaro, Jian Yang, Paul Goldsmith, David Clark, Rino Tirikatene, Megan Woods, Andrew Little, Eugenie Sage, Jan Logie, Steffan Browning, Denise Roche, Holly Walker, Julie Anne Genter, Tracey Martin, Andrew Williams, Richard Prosser, Denis O'Rourke, Asenati Taylor, Brendan Horan

MPs returning: John Banks, Winston Peters, Barbara Stewart

MPs defeated: Paul Quinn, Steve Chadwick, Stuart Nash, Carmel Sepuloni, Rick Barker, Rahui Katene

MPs defeated, but who returned later in the 50th Parliament: Aaron Gilmore, Carol Beaumont, Kelvin Davis

=== Election expenses ===
The Electoral Commission released party electoral expense returns on 21 March 2012, stating how much each party spent on campaigning between 26 August and 25 November 2011. Candidate only expenses were excluded.

Of note in the party expenses was the $1.88 million spent by the Conservative Party, spending more than but gaining less than one-tenth of the votes of the Labour Party. Translated into dollars spent per party vote gained, the Conservatives spent $31.71 per vote, compared to Labour's $2.91 and National's $2.19.

Party	Campaign expenditure	Party votes received	Expenditure per party vote
National	$2,321,216	1,058,636	$2.19
Conservative	$1,878,486	59,237	$31.71
Labour	$1,789,152	614,937	$2.91
Green	$779,618	247,372	$3.15
ACT	$617,035	23,889	$25.83
NZ First	$155,903	147,544	$1.06
Māori Party	$72,173	31,982	$2.26
Mana	$60,082	24,168	$2.49
Democrats	$34,676	1,714	$20.23
United Future New Zealand	$27,719	13,443	$2.06
Legalise Cannabis	$4,003	11,738	$0.34
Libertarianz	$2,760	1,595	$1.73
Alliance	$2,407	1,209	$1.99
Total/Average	$7,745,081	2,237,464	$3.46

== Post-election party leadership changes ==
The ACT party's mediocre election results (1.1% of the party vote, with no list MPs, 1 electorate MP) led to Don Brash tendering his resignation as leader, saying that he took full responsibility for their poor performance.

The Labour Party's leader Phil Goff and the deputy leader Annette King tendered their resignations, effective on 13 December 2011, to a meeting of the party caucus on 29 November. After a fortnight-long leadership campaign and election, David Shearer, with deputy Grant Robertson, won caucus support over the ticket of David Cunliffe and Nanaia Mahuta.
