= Co-leaders of Te Pāti Māori =

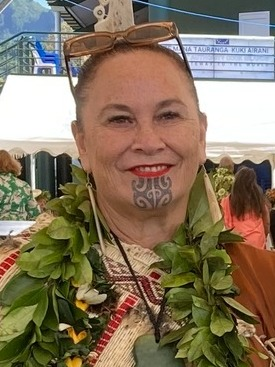
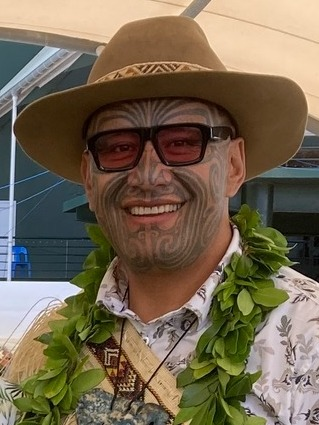
- Ngarewa-Packer in 2025 Waititi in 2025 Incumbents; Debbie Ngarewa-Packer and Rawiri Waititi since 15 April 2020 and 28 October 2020
- Type: Political party office
- Term length: 3 years, renewable
- Formation: 7 July 2004
- First holder: Tariana Turia; Pita Sharples
- Website: maoriparty.org.nz

The co-leaders of Te Pāti Māori (previously co-leaders of the Māori Party) are the dual highest-ranking members of Te Pāti Māori's caucus. The current co-leaders are Debbie Ngarewa-Packer and Rawiri Waititi.

They serve for 3 year terms, with elections held within six weeks following a general election when required. If a co-leader position becomes vacant otherwise, the party's National Council may appoint someone to fill the role. They must be sitting members of parliament (when the party has such members) and one must be Wāhine (female) and one Tāne (male); if this condition cannot be met than the National Council may appoint someone outside of parliament to the position.

The co-leaders make up two-fifths of the party's National Executive alongside the party president and co-vice presidents. At party general meetings, one co-leader is required to be present in order to meet quorum.

== List of co-leaders ==
Co-leaders of Te Pāti Māori
No.	Co-Leader	Portrait	Requirement (Note: Te Pāti Māori requires one co-leader be Wāhine (female) and one be Tāne (male).)	Electorate	List Placement (Note: List placement sources)		Term Start	Term End
1	Tariana Turia (1944–2025)	Tariana Turia	Gender; Wāhine	Te Tai Hauāuru	n/a	2004–2005	7 July 2004	1 November 2014
1	Tariana Turia (1944–2025)	Tariana Turia	Gender; Wāhine	Te Tai Hauāuru	1st	2005–2011	7 July 2004	1 November 2014
1	Tariana Turia (1944–2025)	Tariana Turia	Gender; Wāhine	Te Tai Hauāuru	7th	2011–2014	7 July 2004	1 November 2014
1	Pita Sharples (b. 1941)	Pita Sharples	Gender; Tāne	None	n/a	2004–2005	7 July 2004	13 July 2013
1	Pita Sharples (b. 1941)	Pita Sharples	Gender; Tāne	Tāmaki Makaurau	2nd	2005–2011	7 July 2004	13 July 2013
1	Pita Sharples (b. 1941)	Pita Sharples	Gender; Tāne	Tāmaki Makaurau	8th	2011–2014	7 July 2004	13 July 2013
3	Te Ururoa Flavell (b. 1955)	Te Ururoa Flavell	Gender; Tāne	Waiariki	9th	2013–2014	13 July 2013	19 July 2018
3	Te Ururoa Flavell (b. 1955)	Te Ururoa Flavell	Gender; Tāne	Waiariki	1st	2014–2017	13 July 2013	19 July 2018
3	Te Ururoa Flavell (b. 1955)	Te Ururoa Flavell	Gender; Tāne	None	n/a	2017–2018	13 July 2013	19 July 2018
4	Marama Fox (b. 1970 or 1971)	Marama Fox	Gender; Wāhine	List	2nd	2014–2018	1 November 2014	5 September 2018
	Vacant (2018–2020)							
5	John Tamihere (b. 1959)	John Tamihere	Gender; Tāne	None	n/a	2020	15 April 2020	28 October 2020
5	Debbie Ngarewa-Packer (b. 1966 or 1967)	Debbie Ngarewa-Packer	Gender; Wāhine	List	1st	2020–2023	15 April 2020	incumbent
5	Debbie Ngarewa-Packer (b. 1966 or 1967)	Debbie Ngarewa-Packer	Gender; Wāhine	Te Tai Hauāuru	1st	2023–present	15 April 2020	incumbent
7	Rawiri Waititi (b. 1980 or 1981)	Rawiri Waititi	Gender; Tāne	Waiariki	2nd	2023–present	28 October 2020	incumbent

== See also ==
- Leader of the New Zealand Labour Party
- Leader of the New Zealand National Party
- Co-leaders of the Green Party of Aotearoa New Zealand
- Leader of ACT New Zealand
- Māori protest movement
