= Tariana Turia =

New Zealand politician (1944–2025)

The Honourable Dame Tariana Turia DNZM
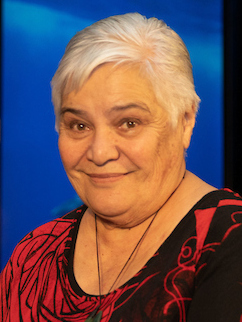
- Turia in 2018

1st Minister for Whānau Ora
- In office 8 April 2010 – 8 October 2014
- Prime Minister: John Key
- Preceded by: Office established
- Succeeded by: Te Ururoa Flavell

2nd Minister for the Community and Voluntary Sector
- In office 15 August 2002 – 30 April 2004
- Prime Minister: Helen Clark
- Preceded by: Steve Maharey
- Succeeded by: Rick Barker
- In office 19 November 2008 – 12 December 2011
- Prime Minister: John Key
- Preceded by: Ruth Dyson
- Succeeded by: Jo Goodhew

Minister for Disability Issues
- In office 13 June 2009 – 8 October 2014
- Prime Minister: John Key
- Preceded by: Paula Bennett
- Succeeded by: Nicky Wagner

1st Co-leader of the Māori Party
- In office 7 July 2004 – September 2014 Co-leading with Pita Sharples
- Preceded by: Position established
- Succeeded by: Marama Fox

Member of the New Zealand Parliament for Labour Party List
- In office 12 October 1996 – 27 July 2002

Member of the New Zealand Parliament for Te Tai Hauāuru
- In office 27 July 2002 – 20 September 2014
- Preceded by: Nanaia Mahuta
- Succeeded by: Adrian Rurawhe

Personal details
- Born: 8 April 1944
- Died: 3 January 2025 (aged 80) Whangaehu, New Zealand
- Party: Māori Party (from 2004)
- Other political affiliations: Labour (until 2004)
- Spouse: George Turia (m. 1962; died 2019)
- Children: 4
- Turia's voice recorded April 2017

Dame Tariana Turia DNZM (née Woon; 8 April 1944 – 3 January 2025) was a New Zealand Māori rights activist and politician. She was first elected to Parliament in 1996 as a representative of the Labour Party. She won the Te Tai Hauāuru electorate in 2002 and broke from Labour in 2004, resigning from Parliament during the foreshore and seabed controversy. Turia returned to Parliament in the resulting by-election as the first representative of the newly formed Māori Party, which she led for the next decade.

Turia held ministerial offices across two governments. From 1999 to 2004 she was a junior minister in the health, housing and social development portfolios and the Minister for the Community and Voluntary Sector in the Fifth Labour Government. In the Fifth National Government, she was Minister for Whānau Ora, a health programme she initiated under a confidence and supply agreement between the National and Māori parties, and Minister for Disability Issues. Turia retired as Māori Party co-leader and a member of Parliament at the general election in September 2014.

== Early life ==
Born Tariana Woon on 8 April 1944 to an American (probably Native American) father and Māori mother, Turia had iwi affiliations to Ngāti Apa, Ngā Rauru, Ngāti Tūwharetoa and Whanganui. She grew up in the small village of Pūtiki, on the Whanganui River, and was raised by a grandmother, whāngai parents and aunties. She was educated at Wanganui Girls' College, and trained as a nurse.

She married George Turia at Rātana Pā on 10 November 1962. They remained married until he died in 2019, and had four children and two whāngai, as well as numerous grandchildren and great-grandchildren.

Before entering politics, she had considerable involvement with a number of Māori organisations, working with Te Puni Kōkiri (the Ministry of Māori Development) and a number of Māori health providers, including Te Oranganui Iwi Health Authority where she was chief executive. While Turia herself never learned to speak te reo Māori, she promoted language revitalisation through the kura kaupapa and kohanga reo movements. With her husband, she led a marae-based skills and employment training programme. In 1995, she was a leader of the 79-day iwi occupation of Moutoa Gardens in Whanganui, which protested unresolved issues from the European colonisation of the area. One of her sons was jailed during the protest for beheading a statue of John Ballance. Later that year, she unsuccessfully contested election to the Whanganui District Council.

== Labour Party ==
Turia was a member of Parliament for the Labour Party from 12 October 1996 until her resignation on 17 May 2005. She was first elected as a list MP in the 1996 general election, ranked 20th on the party list. Her selection as a Labour candidate was controversial. She had only joined the party shortly before her selection as a candidate, although she had been asked to stand in the past. Her personal politics were decried by New Zealand First leader Winston Peters, who described her as a "Māori separatist". The Evening Post described her as a "young radical" (Turia was then 52 years old) and as seeing herself accountable to Māori ahead of the party. Labour's policies on Māori advancement at that election revolved around delivering targeted social services funding to Māori through the mainstream system. Turia later described Labour leader Helen Clark's campaign opening speech as "not too much out of kilter" with her own views.

In her first term, Turia was appointed Labour's spokesperson on Māori health and youth issues and sat on the Māori affairs committee. When swearing her oath of allegiance in Parliament, Turia swore allegiance to the Treaty of Waitangi rather than the Queen. In her maiden statement on 26 February 1997, she acknowledged Labour's defeated Māori electorate candidates Whetu Tirikatene-Sullivan, Peter Tapsell, Koro Wētere and Matiu Rata and asserted the following statement on tino rangatiratanga (Māori self-determination):

The Declaration of Independence is an international declaration that recognises the sovereignty of the independent tribes of Aotearoa. It was the forerunner to the Treaty of Waitangi, and it has a flag to symbolise tribal rights to trade as independent nations, which has been ignored for years by successive New Zealand Governments and never been acknowledged as an important part of our history by the education system. The Treaty of Waitangi was a declaration of traditional Māori rights of absolute authority over Aotearoa, reaffirming the conditions set out in the Declaration of Independence. The treaty document is a statement of this concession and forms the fundamental constitutional basis of our nation. It is the document that cements our relationships by guaranteeing tauiwi rights to be in this country and to have governance over yourselves, and acknowledges tangata whenua rights to our rangatiratanga as independent tribal peoples... Each tribe is a sovereign people in its own right.

New Zealand Parliament
Years	Term	Electorate	List	Party
1996–1999	45th	List	20	Labour
1999–2002	46th	List	16	Labour
2002–2004	47th	Te Tai Hauāuru	None	Labour
2004–2005	47th	Te Tai Hauāuru		Māori Party
2005–2008	48th	Te Tai Hauāuru	1	Māori Party
2008–2011	49th	Te Tai Hauāuru	1	Māori Party
2011–2014	50th	Te Tai Hauāuru	7	Māori Party

She also described non-Māori New Zealanders as "tauiwi" (foreigners). Of that speech, the Dominion newspaper wrote "Parliament's real radical stands up... and declined to tiptoe around Pakeha sensitivities." United New Zealand party leader Peter Dunne (also a former Labour MP) responded in The Evening Post the following month by saying Turia's "backward-looking negativism is driving a wedge between New Zealanders, regardless of their ethnic origin, and it is time it ceased." He complained to the Race Relations Conciliator. Turia received more criticism for her views when she said in 1997 that the Treaty of Waitangi was more important than the Ten Commandments. She also clashed with some long-serving MPs in her party, including Mike Moore, over their different approaches to Māori development. Turia's outspokenness, the Dominion wrote, was a hindrance to Labour's bid to reclaim office at the next election because her actions "fed suspicions that an unacceptable radicalism persists in the party." New parties centring on Māori interests formed after the breakup of the National–New Zealand First coalition government, but Turia remained with Labour.

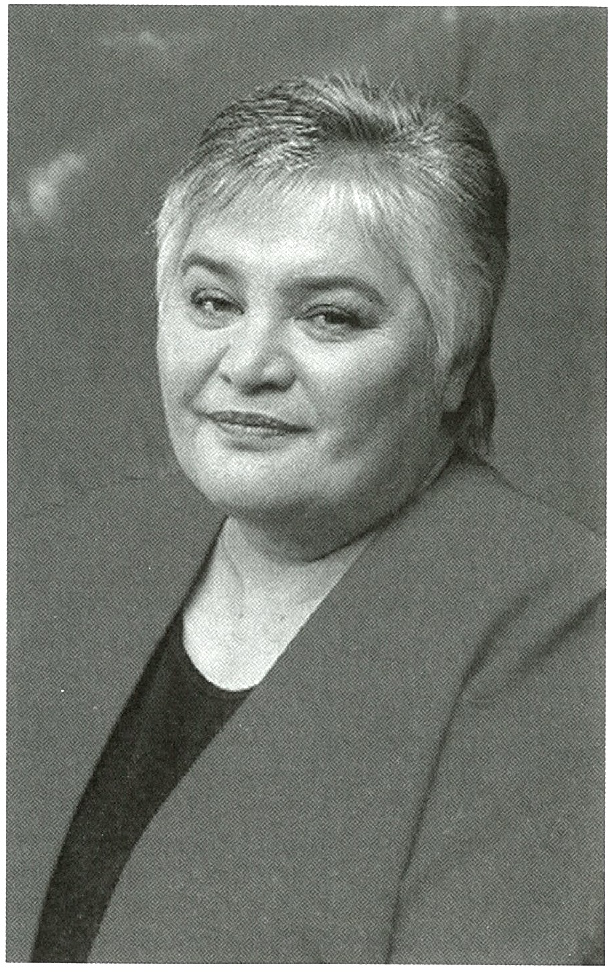
Turia in 2001

After losing selection in the Te Tai Hauāuru electorate to her colleague Nanaia Mahuta, Turia was re-elected as a Labour list MP in the 1999 election (ranked 16th). Mahuta changed electorates for the 2002 election; Turia won selection in Te Tai Hauāuru and the seat as an electorate-only candidate. From December 1999, she was a minister outside of Cabinet in the Fifth Labour Government. In the government's first term, she was a Minister of State and an associate minister in the health, housing, Māori affairs, and social services portfolios. Early in her time as a minister, Turia was warned by prime minister Helen Clark about opinions she voiced on the "holocaust" caused to Māori by colonisation and apologised in Parliament for her statements. While she did not lose her ministerial positions, The New Zealand Herald reported that Turia offered her resignation over the scandal. In a subsequent speech, she set out her view that "self-governance, as being the choice of self-determination, for me means the right to participate in and control the processes through which decisions that affect our lives are made." Turia championed partnership with and devolution to mana whenua in the delivery of State health and education services, but was not always successful.

In November 2000, Turia was additionally appointed as an associate minister in the corrections portfolio. The following year she attracted controversy when she advocated for prisoners known to her to have special treatment including the cancellation of a transfer, other transfers to be closer to family, a review of an inmate's security rating, and for charges to be downgraded. She was also scrutinised for a telephone call she made to the chief judge of the Māori Land Court about a case involving one of her iwi. A twelfth case of alleged interference in prison operations was reported in early 2002. After the July 2002 general election, Turia was not reappointed in the corrections portfolio (she retained her responsibilities in health, housing, social services and Māori affairs); her spokesperson said she had offered to "give up" the corrections role in order to continue to advocate on behalf of her constituents. Instead, she became Minister for the Community and Voluntary Sector. She launched the Office for the Community and Voluntary Sector in September 2003.

When debate about ownership of New Zealand's foreshore and seabed broke out in 2003, and the Labour Party proposed vesting ownership in the state, Turia voiced dissatisfaction. Along with many of her supporters in Te Tai Hauāuru, she claimed that Labour's proposal amounted to an outright confiscation of Māori land. When it became publicly known that Turia might vote against Labour's bill in parliament, tensions between Turia and the Labour Party's leadership increased. The hierarchy strongly implied that if Turia did not support Labour policy, she could not retain her ministerial roles. On 30 April 2004, after a considerable period of confusion about Turia's intentions, she announced in a speech at Rātana Pā that she would resign from the Labour Party and from parliament on 17 May. Clark removed her from her ministerial roles the same day.

== Māori Party ==
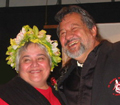
Turia with Pita Sharples at the Māori Party launch event, 2005

Turia's resignation from Parliament precipitated a by-election being called in Te Tai Hauāuru, which Turia contested as a member of the new Māori Party that formed around her. Her supporters saw Turia as having bravely defied her party in order to stand up for her principles. The Labour Party criticised Turia for putting the foreshore and seabed issue before the party's wider policies for Māori development, and said that she unreasonably focused on a single issue. Helen Clark said that Turia showed "an astonishing lack of perspective". Turia described the Te Tai Hauāuru by-election of 10 July 2004 as a chance to test her mandate, and to ensure that she had the support of her voters, but doubts remained about the significance of the by-election, since none of the major parties put forward candidates. Labour called the event "a waste of time and money", although the by-election was required because electoral integrity legislation of the time prevented her resigning from Labour and remaining in Parliament as an independent. Turia received 92.74% of the vote in the by-election, and resumed her seat in Parliament on 27 July 2004. She voted against the Foreshore and Seabed Act 2004, which passed with Labour and New Zealand First's support in November 2004.

For her efforts in splitting from Labour to establish the Māori Party, she was named political journalist John Armstrong's 2004 politician of the year. Turia sat on the primary production committee from 13 August 2004 for the remainder of the term. Much of her political effort went into building up her new party, which she co-led alongside Pita Sharples. She also opposed the government's campaign to immunise children against meningococcal disease. At the 2005 general election, held on 17 September, Turia was re-elected in Te Tai Hauāuru and three more Māori Party candidates won parliamentary seats: co-leader Sharples in Tāmaki Makaurau, Hone Harawira in Te Tai Tokerau and Te Ururoa Flavell in Waiariki. She pledged to repeal the Foreshore and Seabed Act if her party was able to form a government but expressed a desire not to enter a coalition agreement with Labour. The Māori Party was in opposition for the term. Turia was her party's representative on the health committee. At the end of 2005, the New Zealand Listener named her as the twentieth most influential New Zealander. She delivered a keynote address at the ACT New Zealand party conference in March 2006. Later that year she drafted legislation to repeal the Foreshore and Seabed Act, although it was never debated in Parliament.

=== Supporting the Fifth National Government ===
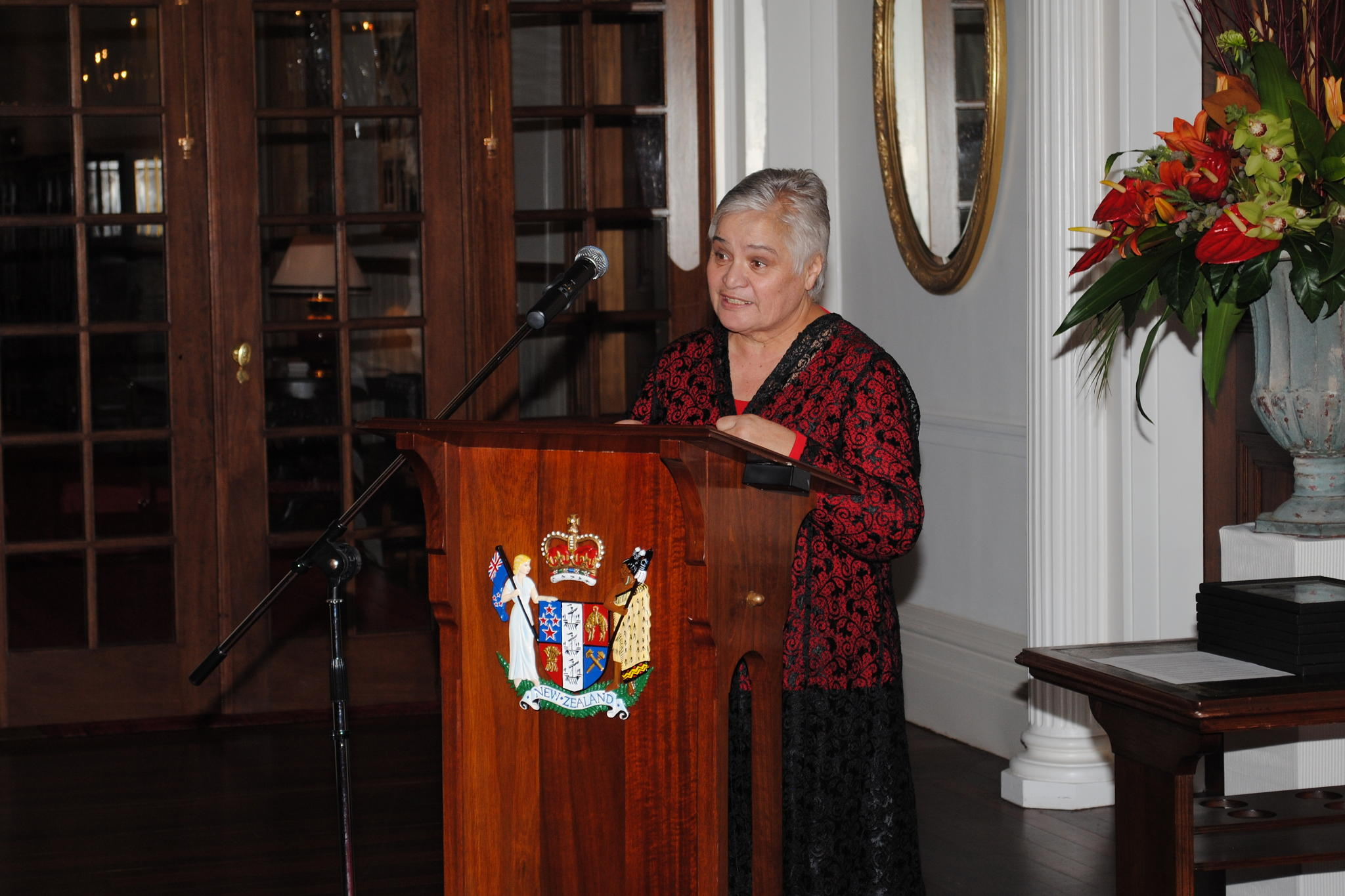
Turia speaking in 2011

While Turia had considered standing down at the 2008 general election, she decided to recontest her electorate. Support for the Māori Party increased with the party gaining an additional seat. National won most seats overall and agreed to form a minority government with support from the Māori Party as well as ACT New Zealand and United Future. In return for Māori Party support in confidence and supply, John Key agreed to not abolish the Māori seats without the consent of Māori. The parties also agreed to review the Foreshore and Seabed Act 2004 and to consider Māori representation in a wider constitutional review which began in 2010. Turia and co-leader Sharples were both made ministers outside Cabinet. Turia was reappointed Minister for the Community and Voluntary Sector and also became an associate minister in the health, social development, and employment portfolios. Turia was additionally appointed Minister for Disability Issues on 30 June 2009 and Minister for Whānau Ora on 8 April 2010. After the 2011 election, in which Turia was elected for a sixth term, she was reappointed to most of her portfolios but exchanged the community portfolio to be an associate minister of housing.

In 2010, the government announced it would replace the Foreshore and Seabed Act. Turia supported the replacement legislation, the Marine and Coastal Area (Takutai Moana) Act 2011, although she described it as "drafted by politics, rather than what is fair and moral" and the party's support for the bill led to Hone Harawira's resignation. The replacement legislation restored access to the courts enabling iwi (tribes) and hapū (sub-tribes) to seek customary titles and Turia encouraged them to do so. The legislation was led by attorney-general Chris Finlayson, whom Turia later described as "a real friend." Finlayson, in turn, described Turia as his "favourite politician" and dedicated his 2021 book on treaty settlements, He Kupu Taurangi, to her.

In the health portfolio, Turia was responsible for Māori health, disability support services, communicable diseases, sexual health, diabetes, tobacco and women's health. In 2010, the National and Māori Parties announced Whānau Ora, a taskforce designed to streamline social service resources. She led the government's Smokefree 2025 policy which was launched in 2011 and included plain packaging and increased excise taxes for cigarettes. On 7 April 2011, the composition of the Abortion Supervisory Committee was debated. Turia moved that an anti-abortion Pacific Island doctor, Ate Moala, be appointed to the Committee. The vote was lost 67–31 against, with twenty four absences or abstentions. As associate housing minister, Turia launched a ten-year strategy to improve housing for Māori in 2014.

Turia confirmed in November 2013 that she would retire at the 2014 election. She gave her valedictory statement on 24 July 2014. She was succeeded as co-leader of the Māori Party by Marama Fox on 31 October, after Fox's election to Parliament that September. Turia's relation Adrian Rurawhe, the Labour Party candidate, won her former electorate.

== Life after Parliament ==
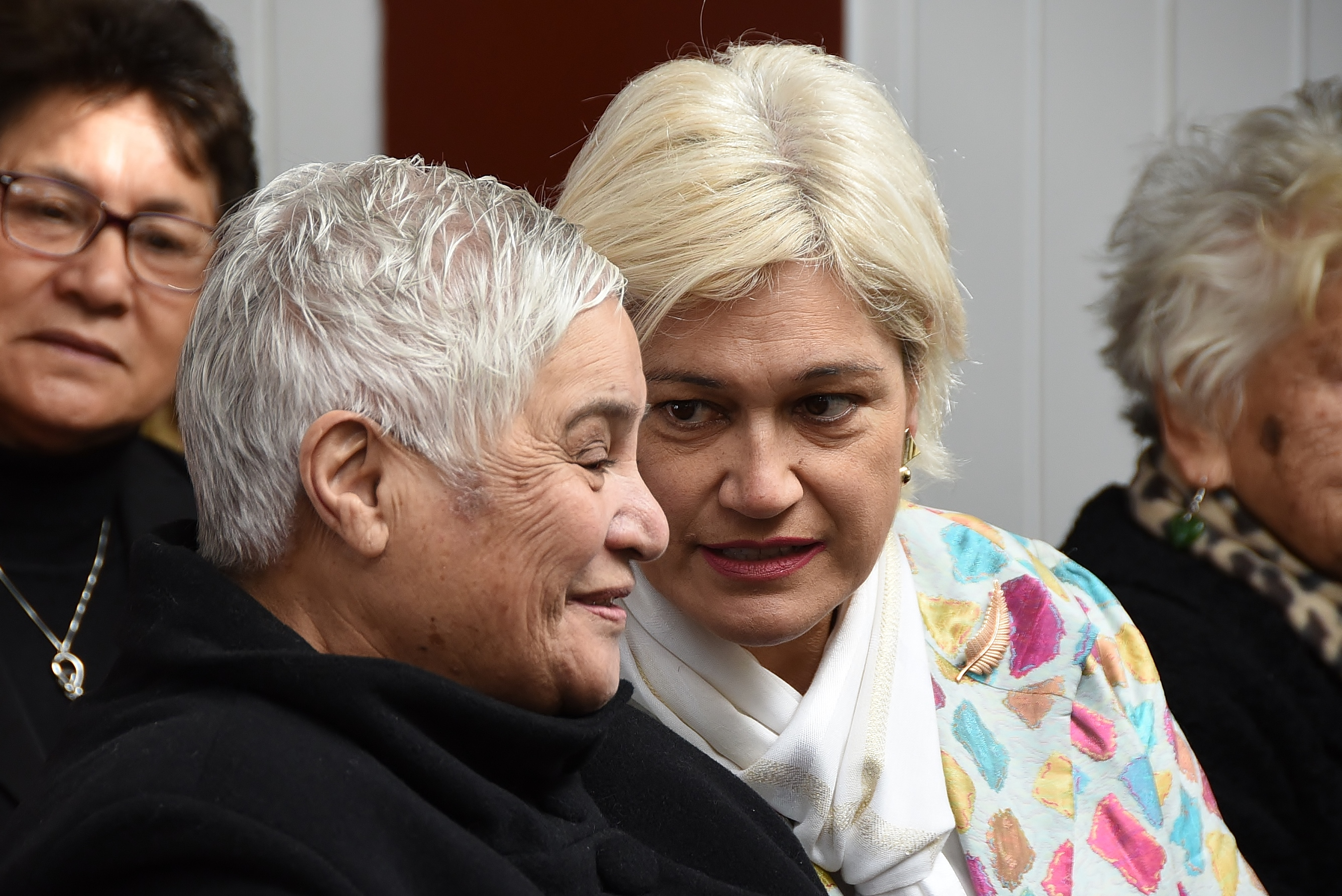
Turia and Harete Hipango (right) in 2018

Turia held various government appointments, particularly in Māori development and health. She supported the development of the Crown apology for actions at Parihaka as part of its Treaty of Waitangi claim settlement with Taranaki iwi in 2015. In 2016, health minister Jonathan Coleman appointed Turia to be a member of the Whanganui District Health Board. In 2017, Turia was appointed a representative of Te Awa Tupua, the legal identity of the Whanganui River after it was given legal personhood. She continued in that role until 2021.

Turia campaigned against the End of Life Choice Bill in 2019, saying that it would undermine whānau (family) values. She endorsed Debbie Ngarewa-Packer, the Māori Party candidate, for the Te Tai Hauāuru electorate in the 2020 general election. However, in the 2023 general election, Turia supported the National Party candidate, her relative Harete Hipango, over Ngarewa-Packer.

In 2022, Turia drew media attention for her anti-vaccination views and opposition to mask mandates during the COVID-19 pandemic. On 17 February 2022, Turia accused prime minister Jacinda Ardern of having Nazi sympathies on Radio New Zealand, in an interview about the Sixth Labour Government's response to the 2022 Wellington anti-vaccination protests. She falsely claimed that Ardern had been filmed as a student doing "almost a Heil Hitler salute."

In conversations about co-governance in 2023, she said she preferred rangatiratanga (self-determination) for iwi. Following the 2023 New Zealand general election, Turia expressed support for the incoming Sixth National Government's plan to scrap Te Aka Whai Ora (the Māori Health Authority). She opined that she would rather see funding being given directly to whānau, iwi and hapū to allow them to manage their own health needs. While Turia praised John Key and Bill English for the Fifth National Government's progress on Māori health, she criticised the outgoing Labour Government for allegedly not taking "into account the differences in the way people view things".

== Death ==
Turia died at Whangaehu Marae, Whangaehu, on 3 January 2025, at the age of 80, after suffering a stroke. That afternoon, her body was taken to lie at Pākaitore, before being carried by waka on the Whanganui River to Pūtiki Marae, and then returned to Whangaehu Marae. Her burial took place there on 7 January.

Turia attracted cross-party tributes from prime minister Christopher Luxon, former prime ministers John Key, Bill English and Chris Hipkins, former attorney-general Chris Finlayson and former United Future leader Peter Dunne, that focused on her "principled leadership" and bravery.

New Zealand First MP Shane Jones criticised protocol at Turia's tangihanga (funeral), which prohibited tributes from people not speaking te reo Māori. Labour MP Willie Jackson said that the Labour Party should consider a formal apology to Turia's whānau over her treatment during her departure from the party.

== Honours and awards ==
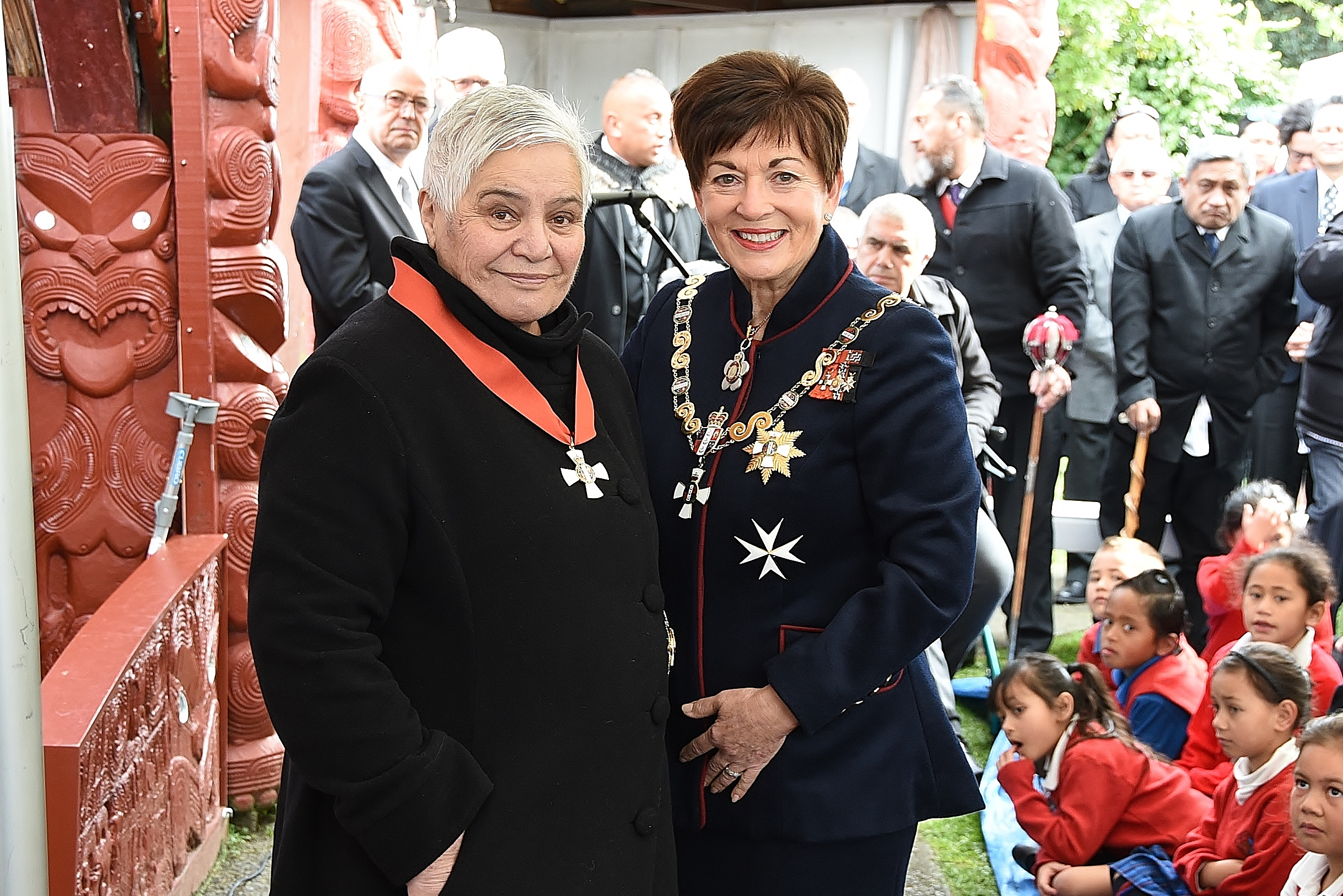
Turia, after her investiture as a Dame Companion of the New Zealand Order of Merit by the governor-general, Dame Patsy Reddy (right), at Pūtiki Marae on 13 August 2018

In the 2015 New Year Honours, Turia was appointed a Dame Companion of the New Zealand Order of Merit, for services as a Member of Parliament. Her investiture, by the governor-general, Dame Patsy Reddy, took place at Pūtiki Marae on 13 August 2018. Also in 2018, Turia received the Blake Medal at the annual Sir Peter Blake Leadership Awards. In 2023, Turia was conferred an honorary doctorate in Māori development by Te Whare Wānanga o Awanuiārangi, in recognition of her "continuing dedication and service to her iwi, to Māori and to the community in a career that has been distinguished by unprecedented firsts over the last five decades".

== Books ==
Walking the Talk: A Collection of Tariana's papers was published in 2005 by Te Wānanga o Raukawa. It collects speeches given by Turia that reflect the kaupapa and early development of the Māori Party.

Turia's biography, Crossing the Floor, was written by her former chief of staff, Helen Leahy, and published by Huia in 2015.

New Zealand Parliament
Preceded by Nanaia Mahuta	Member of Parliament for Te Tai Hauāuru; 2002–2014	Succeeded by Adrian Rurawhe
Party political offices
New political party	Co-leader of the Māori Party; 2004–2014; Served alongside: Pita Sharples, Te Ururoa Flavell	Succeeded by Marama Fox
Political offices
Preceded by Steve Maharey	Minister for the Community and Voluntary Sector; 2003–2004 2008–2011	Succeeded by Rick Barker
Preceded by Ruth Dyson	Minister for the Community and Voluntary Sector; 2003–2004 2008–2011	Succeeded by Jo Goodhew
Preceded by Paula Bennett	Minister for Disability Issues; 2009–2014	Succeeded by Nicky Wagner
New ministerial post	Minister responsible for Whānau Ora; 2010–2014	Succeeded by Te Ururoa Flavell
