= Mita Ririnui =

New Zealand politician

The Honourable Mita Ririnui MP
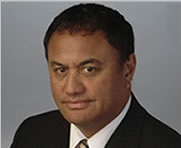

Member of the New Zealand Parliament for Labour party list
- In office 2005–2011

Member of the New Zealand Parliament for Waiariki
- In office 1999–2005
- Succeeded by: Te Ururoa Flavell
- Majority: 6,717 (44.44%) (Note: At 2002 election)

Personal details
- Born: Tauranga, New Zealand
- Party: Labour
- Children: 7

Mita Michael Ririnui is a former New Zealand politician and a member of the Labour Party. He was a member of parliament from 1999 to 2011.

== Early years ==
Ririnui was born in Tauranga. He obtained his education from Tauranga Boys' College, Bay of Plenty Polytechnic, University of Waikato and Massey University. Before entering politics, Ririnui worked for a number of notable Maori community organisations including Te Puni Kōkiri, and he is a registered minister of the Rātana church.

== Member of Parliament ==
New Zealand Parliament
Years	Term	Electorate	List	Party
1999–2002	46th	Waiariki	47	Labour
2002–2005	47th	Waiariki	32	Labour
2005–2008	48th	List	15	Labour
2008–2011	49th	List	23	Labour

Ririnui was originally elected to Parliament as the MP for the Māori electorate of Waiariki, winning the 1999 election from Tuariki Delamere. He retained the seat in 2002. However, in the 2005 election, he lost his electorate seat to Te Ururoa Flavell of the Māori Party and remained in Parliament as a list MP.

At the beginning of his second term as an MP, Ririnui was appointed a Parliamentary Under-Secretary to the ministers responsible for Conservation, Corrections and Treaty of Waitangi Negotiations; in July 2004, his Conservation portfolio was replaced with Health. In December 2004 Ririnui instead became a Minister outside Cabinet, as a Minister of State with Associate Ministerial roles in the Corrections, Health, Treaty of Waitangi Negotiations, and Forestry portfolios, and held these roles until the defeat of the Labour government in 2008. He also chaired the Labour Party's internal Maori Caucus.

Labour was defeated in the 2008 general election, meaning that Ririnui was unable to retain his ministerial positions. He was unsuccessful at regaining Waiariki, but his list placing of 23 ensured his return to Parliament on the Labour list.

On 14 June 2010, four days after the release of ministerial credit card records, Ririnui along with two other MPs Chris Carter and Shane Jones were demoted by Opposition Leader Phil Goff for misuse of such credit cards. In the case of Ririnui, he was accused of purchasing items such as golf clubs and a bike which violate the rules regarding the usage of ministerial credit cards. Ririnui reimbursed Ministerial Services at the time for the purchases. Ririnui's demotion included the loss of the shadow portfolio of Forestry.

In February 2011, Ririnui announced that he would retire at the 2011 election.

=== Ngāti Whakahemo ===
Since 2013, Mita Ririnui has been involved in a treaty claim by Ngāti Whakahemo. He is currently the chairman of the Ngāti Whakahemo Iwi Authority and the Ngāti Whakahemo Claims Committee.

New Zealand Parliament
New constituency	Member of Parliament for Waiariki; 1999–2005	Succeeded by Te Ururoa Flavell
