= Marama Fox =

New Zealand politician

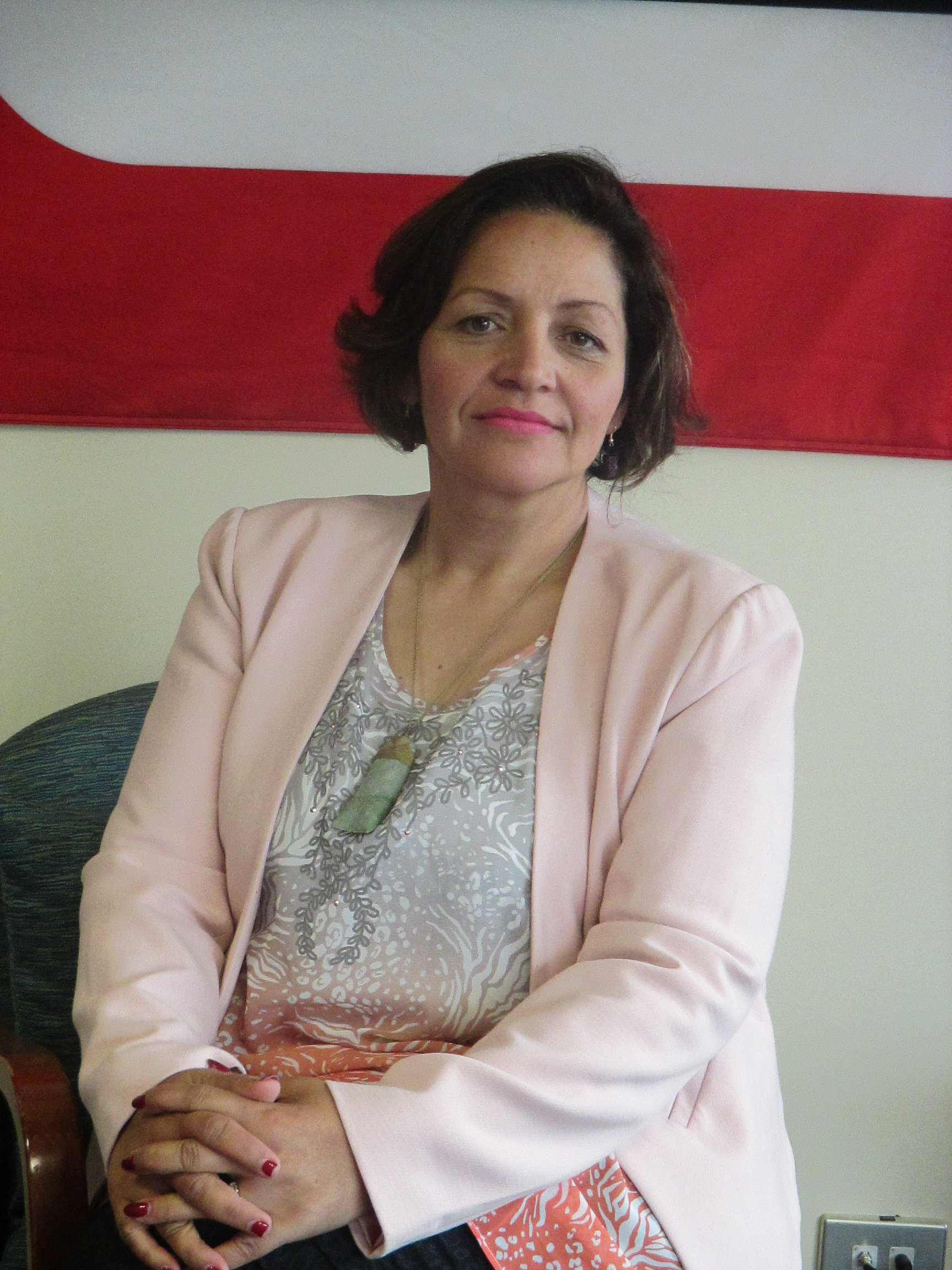
- Fox in 2015

4th Co-leader of the Māori Party
- In office 1 November 2014 – 5 September 2018 Co-leading with Te Ururoa Flavell
- Preceded by: Tariana Turia
- Succeeded by: Debbie Ngarewa-Packer

Member of the New Zealand Parliament for Māori Party List
- In office 20 September 2014 – 23 September 2017

Personal details
- Party: Māori Party

Marama Kahu Fox is a former New Zealand politician who was elected to the New Zealand parliament at the 2014 general election as a representative of the Māori Party. Following her election to parliament, she was named Māori Party co-leader alongside Te Ururoa Flavell, replacing party founder Tariana Turia.

== Private life and professional career ==
When Fox was born, the youngest of five children, the family lived in the Porirua suburb of Cannons Creek. Her father, Ernest Richard "Ernie" Smith, was pākehā and a teacher. Her mother, Frances Smith, founded a pre-school. In the early 1970s, the family lived in Christchurch, where Fox attended Elmwood Primary School in Merivale, Heaton Normal Intermediate, and then Christchurch Girls' High School.

Fox lives in Masterton and has nine children. Prior to becoming an MP, she worked as a teacher and had been in education for 26 years. Fox has described herself as being "a badge wearing Mormon". New Zealand First MP Ron Mark is one of Fox's cousins.

== Political career ==
New Zealand Parliament
Years	Term	Electorate	List	Party
2014–2017	51st	List	2	Māori Party

At the 2014 election Fox stood in the Ikaroa-Rāwhiti electorate, before being elected via the party list. Fox was the Māori Party's first-ever list MP. Fox was appointed co-leader of the Maori Party, succeeding Tariana Turia. She lost her seat at the 2017 election when the Maori Party failed to win any seats and the opposition Labour Party captured all seven of the Māori electorates. Fox expressed bitterness at her defeat and remarked that New Zealand had voted for a return to the "age of colonisation."

She resigned as Māori Party co-leader in September 2018 following controversy around her business activities.

== Post-parliamentary career ==
Fox launched a consulting company after failing to be re-elected to Parliament in 2017. In September 2019, it was reported that liquidators of Fox's failed consulting company had engaged agents to track her down, with fears expressed that she had left the country and was in Australia.

She also appeared on the 2018 season of Dancing with the Stars, finishing ninth of twelve contestants.

Fox admitted to a charge of drink-driving in Hamilton in late 2018, and was sentenced and fined the following year.

Fox was supportive of the 2022 Wellington protests saying that "This is not a Māori protest, but māori are affected by mandates, people have been disenfranchised." While she was triple vaccinated herself she opposed the mandates introduced by the government.

Party political offices
Preceded by Tariana Turia	Co-leader of the Māori Party; 2014–2018; Served alongside: Te Ururoa Flavell	Vacant Title next held by Debbie Ngarewa-Packer
