= Pita Sharples =

New Zealand politician (born 1941)

The Honourable Sir Pita Sharples KNZM CBE
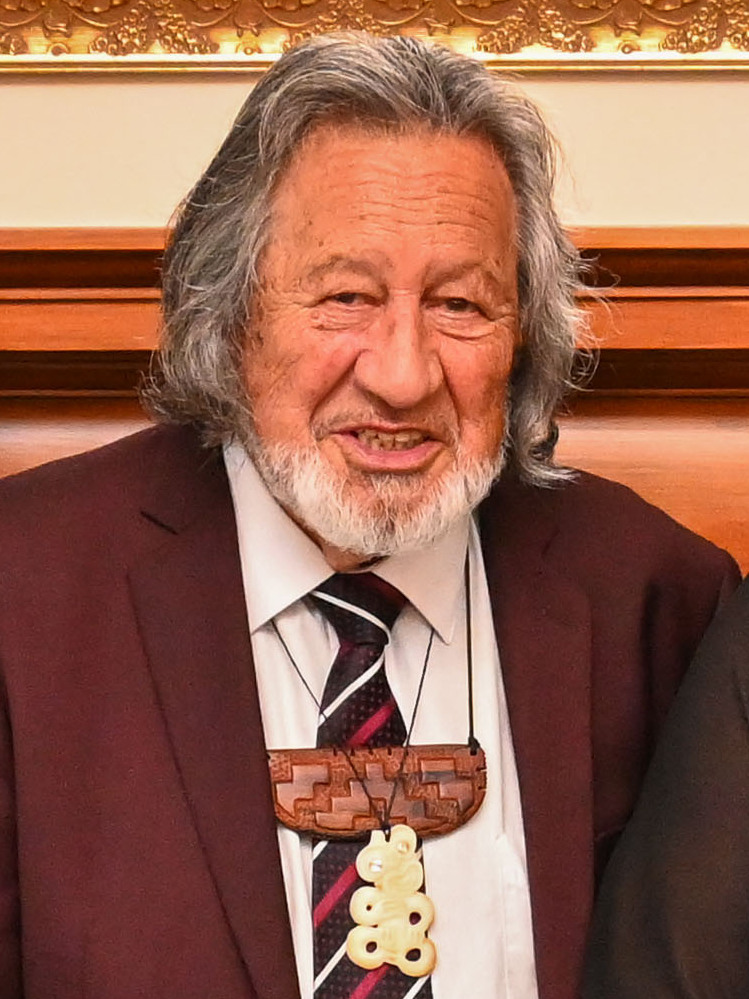
- Sharples in 2024

42nd Minister of Māori Affairs
- In office 19 November 2008 – 8 October 2014
- Prime Minister: John Key
- Preceded by: Parekura Horomia
- Succeeded by: Te Ururoa Flavell (As Minister for Māori Development)

1st Co-leader of the Māori Party
- In office 7 July 2004 – 13 July 2013 Co-leading with Tariana Turia
- Preceded by: Position established
- Succeeded by: Te Ururoa Flavell

Member of the New Zealand Parliament for Tāmaki Makaurau
- In office 5 October 2005 – 20 August 2014
- Preceded by: John Tamihere
- Succeeded by: Peeni Henare
- Majority: 2127 (11.11%)

Personal details
- Born: 20 July 1941 (age 85) Waipawa, Hawke's Bay, New Zealand
- Party: Māori Party

Sir Pita Russell Sharples KNZM CBE (born Peter Russell Sharples, 20 July 1941) is a New Zealand Māori academic and politician, who was a co-leader of the Māori Party from 2004 to 2013, and a minister outside Cabinet in the National Party-led government from 2008 to 2014. He was the member of Parliament for the Tāmaki Makaurau electorate in Auckland from 2005 to 2014. He stepped down as co-leader of the Māori Party in July 2013.

== Early life and education ==
Sharples was born in Waipawa, a town in Hawke's Bay. His mother Ruiha was of Ngāti Kahungunu, and his father Paul was a shearer and a second generation New Zealander whose family came from Bolton, United Kingdom.

He received his early education at Waipukurau District High School, but then became a boarder at Te Aute College. His four years there culminated in his becoming head boy, and he credits this time as a turning point of his life. He then attended the University of Auckland, studying education. After graduating, he remained at the university as an instructor, working at the Faculty of Education. He subsequently gained an MA (1st class) in anthropology, and later a PhD in anthropology and linguistics – both also from the University of Auckland.

== Early career ==
Sharples strongly opposed the construction of Auckland Thermal No. 1, a gas-fired power plant proposed for Te Atatū Peninsula. In 1973, the Third Labour Government of New Zealand abandoned plans for the plant after widespread opposition. During this period, Sharples was inspired to become more politically active, and soon after the scheme was abandoned he wrote a letter to Prime Minister Norman Kirk, explaining his reasons for opposing the plant.

In 1984 Sharples led the kapa haka at the pōwhiri (opening ceremony) of the Te Maori exhibition at the Metropolitan Museum of Art in New York.

== Member of Parliament ==
New Zealand Parliament
| Years | Term | Electorate | List | Party |
|---|---|---|---|---|
| 2005–2008 | 48th | Tamaki Makaurau | 2 | Māori Party |
| 2008–2011 | 49th | Tāmaki Makaurau | 2 | Māori Party |
| 2011–2014 | 50th | Tāmaki Makaurau | 8 | Māori Party |

In addition to his academic work, Sharples has long advocated a separate Māori political party. After the foreshore and seabed controversy in 2003–2004, Sharples joined forces with Tariana Turia a former minister in the Labour Party government who resigned over the issue. Turia and Sharples organised a new party based around Turia's Te Tai Hauāuru seat which was launched on 7 July 2004 as the Māori Party with Sharples as co-leader.

In the 2005 general election Sharples contested and won the urban Auckland seat of Tamaki Makaurau displacing former Labour MP John Tamihere.

== Minister of Māori Affairs ==
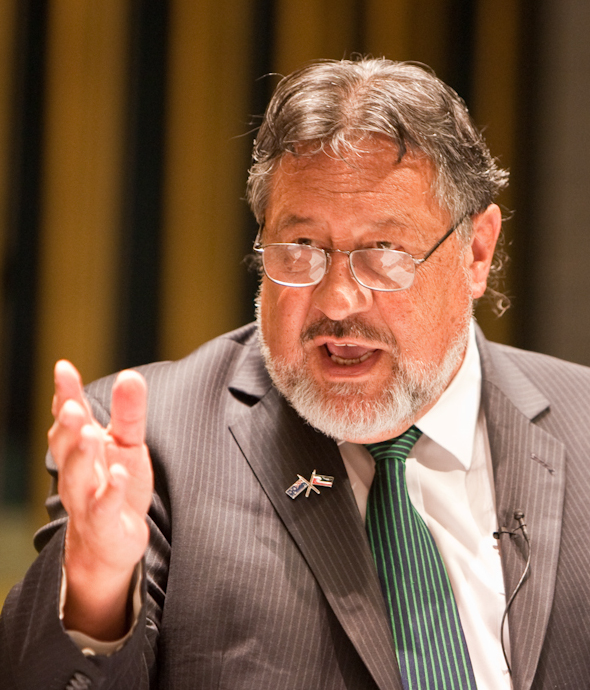
Sharples speaking at the Ninth Session of the UN Permanent Forum on Indigenous Issues, New York City, 18 April 2010

In the 2008 general election Sharples was re-elected with a majority of more than 7000. The National Party won more seats overall and formed a minority government with support from the Māori Party, ACT New Zealand and United Future. Sharples was appointed as Minister of Māori Affairs, although like other support party members he remained outside Cabinet. Sharples was returned to parliament in the 2011 general election, and retained the Māori Affairs portfolio. He resigned as co-leader of the Māori Party in July 2013, and retired from Parliament at the 2014 election.

== Honours and awards ==
Sharples was appointed a Commander of the Order of the British Empire, for services to the Māori people, in the 1990 Queen's Birthday Honours. In the 2015 Queen's Birthday Honours, he was appointed a Knight Companion of the New Zealand Order of Merit, for services as a Member of Parliament and to Māori.

His other awards include:

- National Male Leader, Te Matatini, for five separate years.
- Tohunga Tū Taua, Te Whare Tū Taua o Aotearoa, 1985.
- Kaitātaki Tane Award, National Male Leader, Te Matatini, 2000.
- Tohunga Huarewa, Te Wānanga Whare Tapere o Takitimu, Massey University, 2001.
- Icon Award Whakamana Hiranga, The Arts Foundation, 2024.

New Zealand Parliament
| Preceded by John Tamihere | Member of Parliament for Tāmaki Makaurau; 2005–2014 | Succeeded by Peeni Henare |
Political offices
| Preceded by Parekura Horomia | Minister of Māori Affairs; 2008–2014 | Succeeded by Te Ururoa Flavell |
Party political offices
| New political party | Co-leader of the Māori Party; 2004–2013; Served alongside: Tariana Turia | Succeeded by Te Ururoa Flavell |
