= 2004 Te Tai Hauauru by-election =

New Zealand by-election

← 2002 general	10 July 2004	2005 general →
- Turnout: 7,861
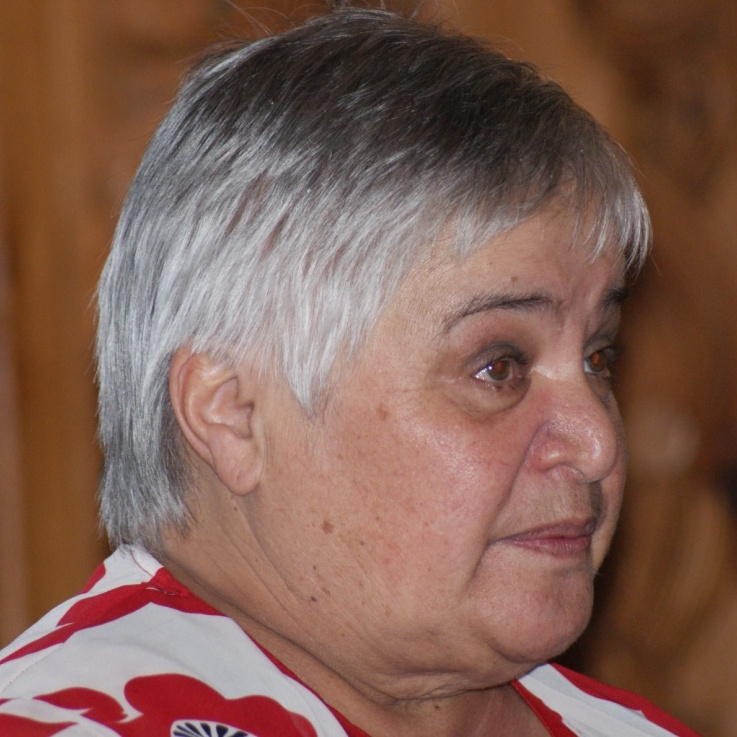
Candidate	Tariana Turia
Party	Māori Party
Popular vote	7,256
Percentage	92.74%
Member before election
Tariana Turia
Labour
Elected Member
Tariana Turia
Māori Party

The Te Tai Hauauru by-election was a by-election in the New Zealand electorate of Te Tai Hauāuru, one of the Māori electorates. The date set for the by-election was 10 July 2004. It saw the re-election of Tariana Turia, a former MP for the Labour Party and now co-leader of the Māori Party.

Turia had quit both Parliament and the Labour Party in protest over the government's position in the foreshore and seabed controversy. She contested the by-election as a member of the new Māori Party, which she played a leading role in establishing. None of the major parties contested the by-election, and Turia was always the overwhelming favourite to win. Perhaps due to the apparent inevitability of a win for Turia, only around 32% of Te Tai Hauauru voters cast ballots.

Nominations for the by-election closed on 15 June 2004. Candidates were:

- Tariana Turia (Māori Party)
- Peter Wakeman, a Labour Party member who stood as an independent.
- Dun Mihaka (Aotearoa Legalise Cannabis Party), a veteran Māori activist best known for baring his buttocks to the Queen on her 1983 Royal Tour of New Zealand.
- Tahu Nepia, who stood as an independent, but represented the Ratana movement, with the intent of establishing an Independent Ratana Party to contest the next general election.
- Rusty Kane, an independent who campaigned on the platform that Māori electorates should be abolished.
- David Bolton, independent.

If no candidates had been put forward to oppose Turia, she would have been declared the winner without a vote – this initially appeared possible, and given the cost of a by-election (estimated at almost NZ$500,000), many hoped that a vote could be avoided.

The holding of a by-election was criticised by a number other parties. The Labour Party, of which Turia was originally a member (and which has traditionally dominated the Māori electorates) has called the by-election "a waste of time and money", and a "sideshow" although the by-election was required by Labour-supported waka-jumping law in force at the time. Labour nominated Errol Mason to contest the seat at the subsequent 2005 general election, losing to Turia.

== Results ==
The following table shows the final results of the by-election:

2004 Te Tai Hauauru by-election
Notes: Blue background denotes the winner of the by-election. Pink background denotes a candidate elected from their party list prior to the by-election. Yellow background denotes the winner of the by-election, who was a list MP prior to the by-election. A ✓ or ✗ denotes status of any incumbent, win or lose respectively.
Party	Candidate	Votes	%	±%
Māori Party	✓ Tariana Turia	7,256	92.74	
Legalise Cannabis	Dun Mihaka	197	2.52	
Independent	Tahu Nepia	183	2.24	
Independent	Peter Wakeman	80	1.02	
Independent	David Bolton	70	0.89	
Independent	Rusty Kane	38	0.49	
Majority		7,059	24.9	
Turnout		7,861^{a}	27.85	
Māori Party gain from Labour		Swing		

^{a} Includes 37 informal votes but does not include any disallowed special votes.
