= Waiariki (electorate) =

- Single-member Māori constituency for the New Zealand House of Representatives
- Formation: 1999
- Region: Bay of Plenty; Hawke's Bay (Taharua); Waikato
- Character: Urban and rural
- Term: 3 years

Member for Waiariki
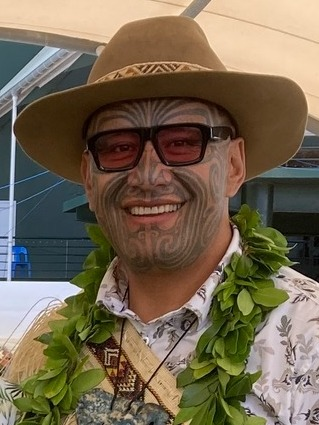
- Rawiri Waititi since 17 October 2020
- Party: Te Pāti Māori
- Previous MP: Tāmati Coffey (Labour)
Party vote distribution

Waiariki is a New Zealand parliamentary Māori electorate that was established for the 1999 election, replacing the Te Tai Rawhiti electorate. It is currently held by Te Pāti Māori co-leader Rawiri Waititi, who won it in the 2020 and 2023 general elections.

Waiariki was an important electorate in the 2020 election as Waititi's win allowed the Māori Party to re-enter parliament with two MPs, despite not reaching the 5% party vote threshold needed for parties without an electorate seat.

== Population centres ==
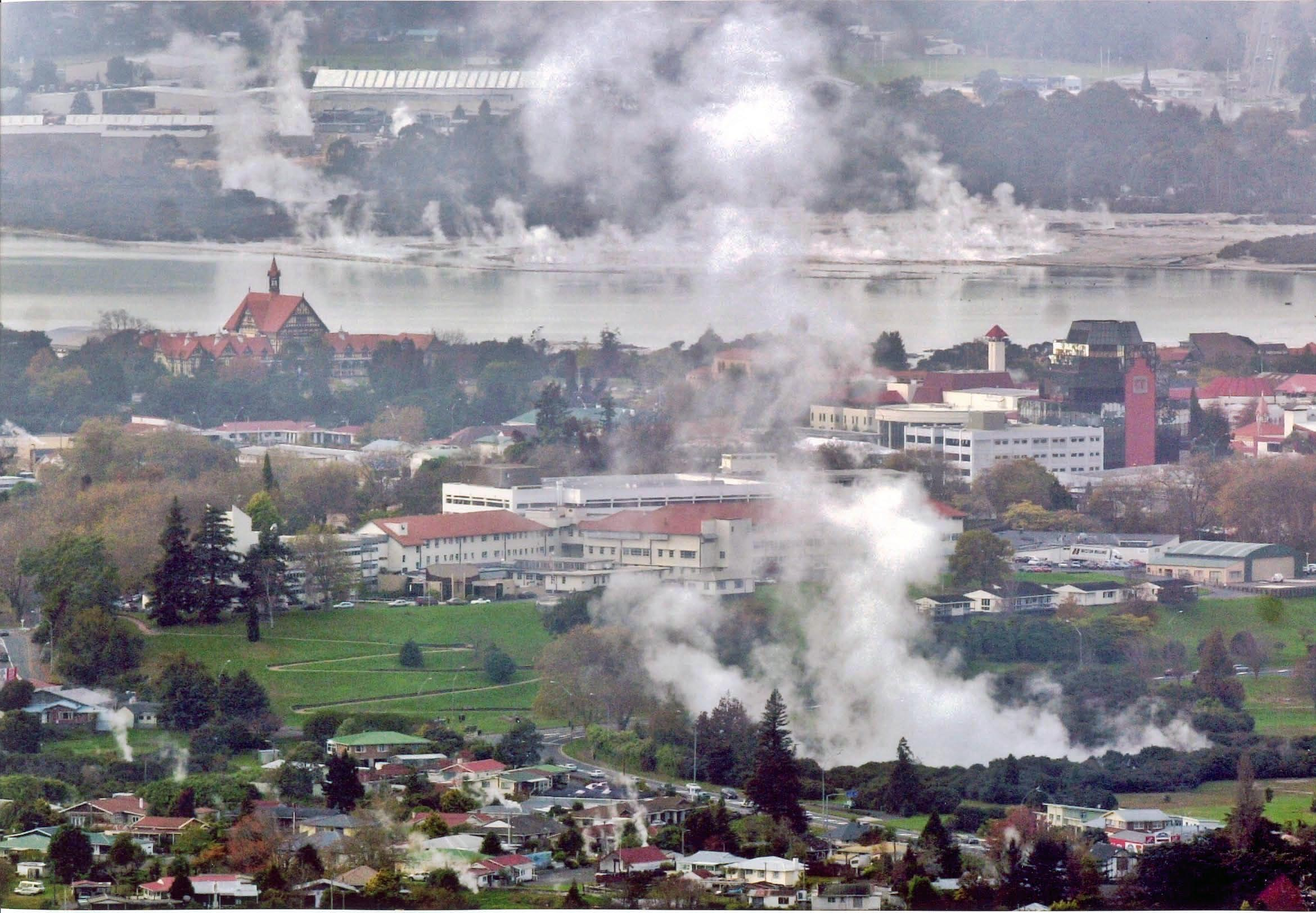
Rotorua

The electorate includes the following population centres:

- Tauranga
- Whakatāne
- Rotorua
- Taupō

In the 2013/14 redistribution, a minor boundary adjustment was undertaken. A small area, including the village of Tuai, was transferred to Waiariki from the Ikaroa-Rāwhiti electorate.

== Tribal areas ==
The electorate includes the following tribal areas:

- Waitaha-Nui-ā-Hei
- Ngāti Ranginui
- Ngāi Te Rangi
- Te Arawa
- Ngāti Awa
- Ngāi Tūhoe
- Whakatōhea
- Ngāi Tai
- Te Whānau-ā-Apanui
- Ngāti Kahungunu ki Wairoa
- Ngāti Tūwharetoa

== History ==
The electorate was created for the 1999 election. The first representative was Mita Ririnui of the Labour Party, with Tuariki Delamere (Te Tawharau) coming second, Arapeta Tahana (Alliance) coming third and Kahukore Baker (New Zealand First) coming fourth.

In the 2002 election, Ririnui was confirmed with 61.93% of the electorate vote. Rihi Vercoe and Hamuera Mitchell of Mana Māori and the National Party came second and third, respectively.

In the 2005 election, Ririnui was beaten by Te Ururoa Flavell of the Māori Party. Hawea Vercoe of Destiny New Zealand came a distant third. The 2008 election was contested by two contenders: the incumbent and Ririnui. Flavell was once again confirmed.

The 2011 election was contested by three contenders: Flavell, Annette Sykes of the Mana Party and Louis Te Kani of the Labour Party. Flavell had a comfortable lead over Sykes, with Te Kani coming third. In the 2014 election, Flavell gained a much increased majority.

Labour's Tāmati Coffey beat Flavell in 2017. This left the Māori Party without any electorate seats, and consequently, no parliamentary representation as they had not reached the 5% party vote threshold required to enter Parliament without winning an electorate. The Māori Party's Rawiri Waititi won the electorate back at the 2020 election, which allowed the Māori Party to have two MPs.

=== Members of Parliament ===
Key

Labour Te Pāti Māori

Election	Winner
1999 election	Mita Ririnui
2002 election	Mita Ririnui
2005 election	Te Ururoa Flavell
2008 election	Te Ururoa Flavell
2011 election	Te Ururoa Flavell
2014 election	Te Ururoa Flavell
2017 election	Tāmati Coffey
2020 election	Rawiri Waititi
2023 election	Rawiri Waititi

=== List MPs ===
Members of Parliament elected from party lists in elections where that person also unsuccessfully contested the Waiariki electorate. Unless otherwise stated, all MPs terms began and ended at general elections.

Election	Winner
2005 election	Mita Ririnui
2008 election	Mita Ririnui
2020 election	Tāmati Coffey

== Election results ==
=== 2026 election ===
The next election will be held on 7 November 2026. Candidates for Waiariki are listed at Candidates in the 2026 New Zealand general election by electorate § Waiariki. Official results will be available after 27 November 2026.

=== 2023 election ===
2023 general election: Waiariki
Notes:	Blue background denotes the winner of the electorate vote. Pink background denotes a candidate elected from their party list. Yellow background denotes an electorate win by a list member, or other incumbent. A ✓ or ✗ denotes status of any incumbent, win or lose respectively.						
Party	Candidate	Votes	%	±%	Party votes	%	±%
Te Pāti Māori	✓ Rawiri Waititi	21,500	74.24	+27.46	11,300	37.60	+19.85
Labour	Toni Boynton	5,609	19.36	−24.26	12,892	42.90	−17.77
Vision NZ	Charles Tiki Hunua	1,067	3.68	–0.74			
Green					1,637	5.44	–0.51
NZ First					1,109	3.69	–0.02
National					1,003	3.33	+0.94
Freedoms NZ					417	1.38	–
Legalise Cannabis					245	0.81	–0.73
NZ Loyal					241	0.80	–
ACT					221	0.73	–0.21
Opportunities					159	0.52	–0.38
NewZeal					150	0.49	–0.03
DemocracyNZ					31	0.10	–
Women's Rights					30	0.09	–
Animal Justice					24	0.07	–
Leighton Baker Party					15	0.04	–
New Conservatives					7	0.02	–0.36
New Nation					4	0.01	–
Informal votes		782			566		
Total valid votes		28,958			30,051		
Te Pāti Māori hold	Majority	15,891	55.56	+58.72			

=== 2020 election ===
2020 general election: Waiariki
Notes:	Blue background denotes the winner of the electorate vote. Pink background denotes a candidate elected from their party list. Yellow background denotes an electorate win by a list member, or other incumbent. A ✓ or ✗ denotes status of any incumbent, win or lose respectively.						
Party	Candidate	Votes	%	±%	Party votes	%	±%
Māori Party	Rawiri Waititi	12,389	46.78	+0.51	4,843	17.75	−0.46
Labour	✗ Tāmati Coffey	11,553	43.62	−10.12	16,552	60.67	+1.72
Vision NZ	Hannah Tamaki	1,171	4.42	—	626	2.29	—
Advance NZ	Ema Williams	747	2.82	—	733	2.69	—
Outdoors	Rawiri Tekowhai	428	1.62	—	67	0.25	+0.22
New Conservative	Riki Wayne Broughton	198	0.75	—	105	0.38	+0.32
Green					1,622	5.95	+2.09
NZ First					1,001	3.67	−3.75
National					651	2.39	−2.36
Legalise Cannabis					421	1.54	+0.84
ACT					257	0.94	+0.86
Opportunities					246	0.90	−1.97
ONE					142	0.52	—
TEA					7	0.03	—
Social Credit					4	0.01	−0.01
Sustainable NZ					4	0.01	—
Heartland					1	0.00	—
Informal votes		639			417		
Total valid votes		26,486			27,282		
Turnout		27,699	68.69				
Māori Party gain from Labour	Majority	836	3.16	−4.32			

=== 2017 election ===
2017 general election: Waiariki
Notes:	Blue background denotes the winner of the electorate vote. Pink background denotes a candidate elected from their party list. Yellow background denotes an electorate win by a list member, or other incumbent. A ✓ or ✗ denotes status of any incumbent, win or lose respectively.						
Party	Candidate	Votes	%	±%	Party votes	%	±%
Labour	Tāmati Coffey	12,362	53.74	+26.96	14,144	58.95	+20.58
Māori Party	✗ Te Ururoa Flavell	10,643	46.26	+1.61	4,730	19.71	–2.08
NZ First					1,780	7.42	–5.09
National					1,139	4.75	–0.25
Green					926	3.86	–4.12
Opportunities					690	2.88	—
Mana Party					271	1.13	–8.62 (Note: 2017 Mana swing is relative to the votes for Internet Mana in 2014; it shared a party list with Internet in the 2014 election.)
Legalise Cannabis					168	0.70	–0.29
Ban 1080					64	0.27	–0.04
People's Party					27	0.11	—
ACT					19	0.08	±0.00
Conservative					15	0.06	–0.29
Outdoors					7	0.03	—
Democrats					6	0.03	+0.02
Internet					5	0.02	–1.50 (Note: 2017 Internet swing is relative to the votes for Internet Mana in 2014; it shared a party list with Mana in the 2014 election.)
United Future					4	0.02	–0.03
Informal votes		574			334		
Total valid votes		23,005			23,995		
Turnout		24,329					
Labour gain from Māori Party	Majority	1,719	7.47	–12.98			

=== 2014 election ===
2014 general election: Waiariki
Notes:	Blue background denotes the winner of the electorate vote. Pink background denotes a candidate elected from their party list. Yellow background denotes an electorate win by a list member, or other incumbent. A ✓ or ✗ denotes status of any incumbent, win or lose respectively.						
Party	Candidate	Votes	%	±%	Party votes	%	±%
Māori Party	✓ Te Ururoa Flavell	9,726	44.62	+1.57	4,880	21.79	+0.58
Labour	Rawiri Waititi	5,837	26.78	+2.38	8,595	38.37	+3.32
Mana Party	Annette Sykes	5,482	25.15	−7.30			
Independent Coalition	Pat Spellman	301	1.38	+1.38	41	0.18	+0.18
NZ First					2,809	12.51	+1.57
Internet Mana					2,524	11.27	–5.35 (Note: 2014 Internet Mana swing is relative to the votes for Mana in 2011; it shared a party list with Internet in the 2014 election.)
Green					1,787	7.98	–0.86
National					1,120	5.00	–0.68
Legalise Cannabis					222	0.99	+0.99
Conservative					78	0.35	+0.05
Ban 1080					70	0.31	+0.31
ACT					17	0.08	–0.07
United Future					11	0.05	–0.07
Focus					8	0.04	+0.04
Civilian					5	0.02	+0.02
Democrats					2	0.01	±0.00
Informal votes		451			229		
Total valid votes		21,797			22,398		
Māori Party hold	Majority	3,889	17.84	+7.25			

=== 2011 election ===
2011 general election: Waiariki
Notes:	Blue background denotes the winner of the electorate vote. Pink background denotes a candidate elected from their party list. Yellow background denotes an electorate win by a list member, or other incumbent. A ✓ or ✗ denotes status of any incumbent, win or lose respectively.						
Party	Candidate	Votes	%	±%	Party votes	%	±%
Māori Party	✓ Te Ururoa Flavell	7,651	43.05	–25.12	3,989	21.21	–14.05
Mana	Annette Sykes	5,768	32.45	+32.45	3,125	16.62	+16.62
Labour	Louis Te Kani	4,355	24.50	–7.33	6,591	35.05	–10.52
NZ First					2,058	10.94	+3.14
Green					1,663	8.84	+6.19
National					1,068	5.68	+0.18
Legalise Cannabis					201	1.07	+0.14
Conservative					57	0.30	+0.30
ACT					28	0.15	–0.07
United Future					22	0.12	–0.02
Alliance					2	0.01	–0.02
Libertarianz					2	0.01	–0.01
Democrats					1	0.01	–0.005
Informal votes		993			465		
Total valid votes		17,774			18,807		
Māori Party hold	Majority	1,883	10.59	–25.74			

Electorate (as at 26 November 2011): 33,240

=== 2008 election ===
2008 general election: Waiariki
Notes:	Blue background denotes the winner of the electorate vote. Pink background denotes a candidate elected from their party list. Yellow background denotes an electorate win by a list member, or other incumbent. A ✓ or ✗ denotes status of any incumbent, win or lose respectively.						
Party	Candidate	Votes	%	±%	Party votes	%	±%
Māori Party	✓ Te Ururoa Flavell	12,781	68.17	+13.59	6,890	35.26	+4.47
Labour	Mita Ririnui	5,969	31.83	–7.67	8,903	45.57	–7.54
NZ First					1,525	7.80	+1.12
National					1,075	5.50	+2.67
Green					518	2.65	+0.35
Family Party					205	1.05	+1.05
Legalise Cannabis					182	0.93	+0.29
Kiwi					57	0.29	+0.29
Bill and Ben					47	0.24	+0.24
ACT					42	0.21	+0.10
Progressive					28	0.14	–0.10
United Future					26	0.13	–0.32
Workers Party					13	0.07	+0.07
Pacific					9	0.05	+0.05
Alliance					6	0.03	±0.00
RAM					6	0.03	+0.03
Libertarianz					4	0.02	+0.02
Democrats					2	0.01	–0.01
RONZ					1	0.01	–0.01
Informal votes		675			366		
Total valid votes		18,750			19,539		
Turnout		20,614	64.54	–4.89			
Māori Party hold	Majority	6,812	36.33	+21.25			

=== 2005 election ===
2005 general election: Waiariki
Notes:	Blue background denotes the winner of the electorate vote. Pink background denotes a candidate elected from their party list. Yellow background denotes an electorate win by a list member, or other incumbent. A ✓ or ✗ denotes status of any incumbent, win or lose respectively.						
Party	Candidate	Votes	%	±%	Party votes	%	±%
Māori Party	Te Ururoa Flavell	10,392	54.58		6,104	30.79	
Labour	✗ Mita Ririnui	7,521	39.50	–22.43	10,530	53.11	+0.18
Destiny	Hawea Vercoe	1,126	5.91		528	2.66	
NZ First					1,324	6.68	–9.85
National					562	2.83	–0.91
Green					457	2.30	–7.67
Legalise Cannabis					126	0.64	–2.03
United Future					89	0.45	–2.28
Progressive					48	0.24	–0.62
ACT					22	0.11	–0.44
Family Rights					10	0.05	
Christian Heritage					7	0.04	–1.23
Alliance					5	0.03	–1.66
One NZ					4	0.02	–0.05
RONZ					4	0.02	
99 MP					3	0.02	
Democrats					3	0.02	
Direct Democracy					1	0.01	
Libertarianz					0	0.00	
Informal votes		655			322		
Total valid votes		19,039			19,827		
Turnout		20,794	69.43	+11.74			
Māori Party gain from Labour	Majority	2,871	15.08				

=== 2002 election ===
2002 general election: Waiariki
Notes:	Blue background denotes the winner of the electorate vote. Pink background denotes a candidate elected from their party list. Yellow background denotes an electorate win by a list member, or other incumbent. A ✓ or ✗ denotes status of any incumbent, win or lose respectively.						
Party	Candidate	Votes	%	±%	Party votes	%	±%
Labour	✓ Mita Ririnui	9,361	61.93	+16.82	8,322	52.93	–1.99
Mana Māori	Rihi Vercoe	2,644	17.49		947	6.02	–2.41
National	Hamuera Mitchell	1,356	8.97	+5.28	588	3.74	–0.85
United Future	Huikakahu Kawe	852	5.64	+3.99	429	2.73	+1.54^{1}
Alliance	Sharon Heta	542	3.59	–9.10	265	1.69	–4.17
Christian Heritage	Judith Francis	361	2.39		199	1.27	+0.38
NZ First					2,599	16.53	+1.33
Green					1,568	9.97	+6.32
Legalise Cannabis					420	2.67	+0.15
ORNZ					147	0.93	
Progressive					136	0.86	
ACT					87	0.55	+0.03
One NZ					11	0.07	+0.04
NMP					5	0.03	+0.02
Informal votes		529			186		
Total valid votes		15,116			15,723		
Turnout		16,309	57.69				
Labour hold	Majority	6,717	44.44	+19.34			

^{1} United Future swing is compared to 1999 results from both United NZ and Future NZ combined, as the two merged in 2000.

=== 1999 election ===
1999 general election: Waiariki
Notes:	Blue background denotes the winner of the electorate vote. Pink background denotes a candidate elected from their party list. Yellow background denotes an electorate win by a list member, or other incumbent. A ✓ or ✗ denotes status of any incumbent, win or lose respectively.						
Party	Candidate	Votes	%	±%	Party votes	%	±%
Labour	Mita Ririnui	7,853	45.11		9,670	54.92	
Te Tawharau	✗ Tuariki Delamere (Note: Te Tawharau contested the electorate vote independently, but encouraged voters to give their party vote to Mana Māori)	3,484	20.01				
Alliance	Arapeta Tahana	2,210	12.69		1,032	5.86	
NZ First	Kahukore Baker	2,139	12.29		2,676	15.20	
National	George Ngatai	643	3.69		809	4.59	
Mana Wahine	Alamein Kopu	296	1.70				
Mauri Pacific	Te Orohi Paul	292	1.68		302	1.73	
Future NZ	Toa Faulkner	288	1.65		202	1.16	
Freedom Movement	Helen Wepiha-Tai	204	1.17		41	0.24	
Mana Māori					1,469	8.43	
Green					643	3.65	
Legalise Cannabis					439	2.52	
Christian Heritage					155	0.89	
ACT					92	0.52	
Animals First					21	0.12	
Libertarianz					14	0.08	
Natural Law					11	0.06	
McGillicuddy Serious					9	0.05	
People's Choice					8	0.05	
United NZ					6	0.03	
One NZ					5	0.03	
NMP					1	0.01	
Republican					1	0.01	
South Island					1	0.01	
Informal votes		528			330		
Total valid votes		17,409			17,607		
Labour win new seat	Majority	4,369	25.10				
