= Annette Sykes =

New Zealand politician (born 1961)

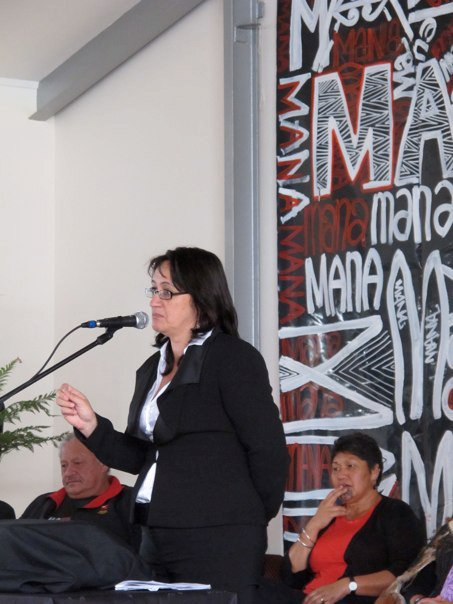
Annette Sykes

Annette Te Imaima Sykes (born c. 1961) is a New Zealand activist and lawyer who advocates for the rights of Māori tribes to be self-governing. She was ranked third on the joint Internet Mana list for the 2014 New Zealand general election.

== Biography ==
Annette Sykes is of Ngāti Pikiao and Ngāti Makino descent, two of the confederated tribes of Te Arawa waka. Her parents were Hilda Te Hirata (nee Whata) Sykes (Ngāti Pikiao-Ngāti Makino), a school teacher, and Cecil Francis 'Jack' Sykes, a Pākehā farmer.

Sykes is a graduate of University of Auckland and has been practising as a lawyer since 1984. She has her own law firm Annette Sykes & Co. Ltd. She is a human rights lawyer specialising in the rights of indigenous peoples to promote their own systems of law. She specialises in Waitangi Tribunal claims but has also practised in criminal and family courts across New Zealand.

Sykes is an advocate for Māori independence and a nuclear free, genetic engineering free independent Pacific. She was a Māori Party member but became a prominent member of the Mana Party in 2011. She was listed second on the Mana Party list for the 2011 election, as well as standing unsuccessfully in the Waiariki electorate. She contested Waiariki for the Mana Party again in 2014, and was third on the combined Internet MANA list, but was not elected. She did not contest the 2017 election.

Sykes represented 17 people arrested in the 2007 New Zealand police raids, including high-profile activist Tame Iti. Most of her clients were cleared of all charges, and an independent report found that many aspects of the raid were "unlawful, unjustified and unreasonable".

Sykes has received death threats and bullets in her letterbox in retaliation for her work on Māori independence. She has also been an outspoken supporter of controversial figures in Māori politics such as Titewhai Harawira.
