= Philip Culbertson =

New Zealand theologian (born 1944)

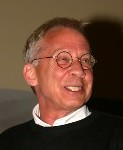
- Born: 1944 (age 80–81)
- Region: Pastoral theology
- School: University of Auckland

Philip Leroy Culbertson (born 1944, died 2022) was a scholar in practical theology. He was a lecturer at the University of Auckland School of Theology and was Director of Pastoral Studies at St John's Theological College until his retirement in 2007. Before this he taught at the School of Theology, University of the South, Sewanee, TN, from 1985 to 1992. He is an ordained priest of the Episcopalian tradition. He is also a psychotherapist in private practice and has taught at two training institutes in Auckland, New Zealand. He is well published in the fields of Pastoral ministry, counselling, gender and spirituality (particularly in relation to some of the Old Testament), and Jewish/Christian dialogue. He eventually converted to Judaism.

In 2004 Culbertson was interviewed by Sunday, a current affairs show broadcast in New Zealand, regarding his opinion of the controversial Destiny Church led by Bishop Brian Tamaki in which among other things he stated, "As far as I can tell it's a cult".

Culbertson died on February 4, 2022.

== Bibliography ==
- The Bible in/and Popular Culture: A Creative Encounter. Edited with Elaine M. Wainwright. Atlanta: SBL, 2010.
- Penina Uliuli: Contemporary Challenges in Mental Health for Pacific Peoples. Edited with Margaret Nelson Agee and Cabrini 'Ofa Makasiale. Honolulu: University of Hawaii Press, 2007.
- The Spirituality of Men: Sixteen Christians write about their Faith. Minneapolis: Fortress Press, 2002.
- Caring for God's People: Counseling and Christian Wholeness. Minneapolis: Fortress Press, 2000.
- Counselling Issues in South Pacific Communities. Auckland : Accent Books, 1997.
- A Word Fitly Spoken: Context, Transmission and Adoption of the Parables of Jesus. Albany: SUNY Press, 1995.
- Counseling Men. The Creative Pastoral Care and Counseling Series. Minneapolis: Fortress Press, 1994.
- New Adam: The Future of Male Spirituality. Minneapolis: Fortress Press, 1992.
- The Pastor: Readings from the Patristic Period. Arthur Bradford Shippee, co-author. Minneapolis: Fortress Press, 1990.
