= The Freedoms & Rights Coalition =

Group opposed to COVID-19 mandates in New Zealand

The Freedoms & Rights Coalition's official logo

The Freedoms & Rights Coalition (TFRC) is a self-described "people's movement" founded by Destiny Church founder and leader Bishop Brian Tamaki in 2021 to oppose the New Zealand Government's COVID-19 lockdown restrictions and vaccine mandates. The group organised protests in Auckland and across New Zealand. In mid-July 2022, the Coalition launched a second wave of protests against the Labour Government, whom they accused of incompetence and contributing to the country's socio-economic problems and shortages.

== Leadership and organisation ==
In early November 2021, Destiny Church's director of operations Jenny Marshall confirmed that the church's founder Bishop Brian Tamaki was the "founder and "architect" of "The Freedoms & Rights Coalition." According to the media company Stuff, Marshall also owned the TFRC's web domain. The Coalition used its website to solicit donations and sells merchandise including t-shirts, flags and facemasks emblazoned with anti-lockdown messaging. According to Marshall, the Coalition's merchandising and donations were separate from the church's finances.

According to TFRC's website, the group's 12 stated goals and policies have included:

- Opposing so-called "unworkable regulations" against farmers and growers.
- Opposing government policies including lockdowns that have hurt businesses.
- Opposing so-called "reckless" spending of taxpayer money.
- Promoting housing affordability by improving property market conditions and introducing financial packages for first-home buyers.
- Opposing Government interference in the family including the removal of parental consents and the alleged liberalisation of the education system.
- Standing up for religious rights, "God's Word," and opposing government efforts to silence churches.
- Promoting a better future for young people by easing government debt.
- Opposing COVID-19 lockdowns and vaccination mandates.
- Opposing so-called "unworkable" Resource Management Act 1991 regulations and tax rules that target property owners, investors and developers.
- Better mental health conditions including combating suicide.
- Standing for the rights of the indigenous Māori people and combating discrimination faced by indigenous peoples.
- Protect the rights and freedoms of New Zealanders.

== History ==
=== COVID-19 protests ===
==== 2021 ====
The Freedoms & Rights Coalition organised its first protest outside the Auckland War Memorial Museum in the Auckland Domain on 2 October 2021. Brian Tamaki addressed the protesters, who numbered between the hundreds and 2,000. Following a Change.org petition, Tamaki was arrested on 12 October and charged with organising a protest in breach of existing lockdown restrictions.

In defiance of COVID-19 lockdown restrictions and bail conditions, Tamaki spoke at a "Freedom Protest" in Auckland on 16 October 2021. Similar Freedom Day protests were held in Whangārei, Mount Maunganui, Whakatāne, Gisborne, Havelock North, Wellington, Nelson and Christchurch. Tamaki was arrested again on 20 October, for breaching his bail conditions. On 30 October, Tamaki's wife Hannah Tamaki spoke at a third "Freedom Protest" in the Auckland Domain in defiance of lockdown restrictions.

On 9 November 2021, the TFRC organised a protest outside the New Zealand Parliament in the capital Wellington, which attracted thousands of protesters from across the North Island. This protest disrupted traffic in Wellington Central.

On 13 November 2021, the TFRC organised a nationwide "Great Gridlock" campaign, which affected several urban centres and regions including Auckland, the Bay of Plenty, Hawke's Bay, Nelson, Wellington, Whangārei, and Christchurch. As part of the protests, participants drove vehicles through urban centres at slow speeds (20 km/h, 12 mph) with the goal of disrupting traffic. Tamaki had earlier threaten to disrupt traffic in all major centres if the Government did not lift all COVID-19 restrictions by 12 November. The Coalition also issued four demands for the Government: to remove vaccination mandates immediately, revoke the traffic light system, lift the Auckland borders and move New Zealand down to Alert level one.

On 20 November 2021, the TFRC organised a nationwide "National Day of Compassion" protest campaign. In addition to Auckland, other protests were held in New Plymouth, Wellington, Gisborne, Whangārei, Rotorua, Hawke's Bay, Nelson, Christchurch and Dunedin. On 23 November, the Tamakis were summoned to the Auckland Central Police station for breaching bail conditions by attending the "National Day of Compassion" protest in Auckland.

On 4 December 2021, the TFRC staged its fifth protest in the Auckland Domain, called the "Mass Exodus". Following the protest, participants marched to Newmarket and Government House, disrupting traffic and local business operations. On 16 December, the TFRC staged a protest march in Wellington outside Parliament, disrupting traffic in the Wellington CBD. This protest was led by Destiny Church senior pastor Derek Tait.

On 16 December, the TFRC organised another protest march in Wellington to oppose vaccine mandates and the Government's new COVID-19 Protection Framework. The protest attracted between 2,000 and 3,000 people and was led by Tait. Participants much from Wellington's Civil Square to the New Zealand Parliament, disrupting traffic in the Wellington CBD.

==== 2022 ====
On 8 January, Tamaki spoke at a rally in Christchurch's Hagley Park where he criticised the Government's COVID-19 vaccine mandate and lockdown policies. Though Tamaki claimed that the event was a "family picnic," Police investigated Tamaki for breaching his bail conditions by attending, speaking and organising at a protest event that breached existing COVID-19 regulations. On 11 January, the Christchurch City Council fined the TFRC NZ$14,117 for staging protests in Cranmer Square and other parts of Christchurch before Christmas 2021. This fine covered the temporary traffic management cost ramifications caused by the protest.

The TFRC subsequently participated in the 2022 Wellington protest, which saw anti-vaccination protesters from various groups occupy the New Zealand Parliament's grounds from 8 February to 3 March 2022. According to Stuff journalists Charlie Mitchell and Glenn McConnell and Newsroom journalist Marc Daalder, the TFRC organised the early stage of the Parliamentary occupation and advocated a policy of restraint. However, their leadership of the Wellington protest was usurped by the far right media group Counterspin Media, which advocated a more aggressive approach that involved confronting police and journalists. On 3 March, the remaining protesters were forcibly removed by Police, which resulted in clashes on Parliament's grounds and the Wellington CBD.

In late February, the TFRC launched its "March Out These Mandates" campaign to oppose the Government's vaccine mandates. Besides Auckland, protests were also planned in Tauranga, Napier, Wellington, Nelson and Christchurch. Tamaki claimed these protests were "peaceful, family-friendly" events. On 26 February, thousands of TFRC supporters marched across the Auckland Harbour Bridge to Auckland's Victoria Park. Several TFRC protesters camped in the Auckland Domain until 3 March.

On 12 March, over a thousand TFRC protesters led by Derek Tait marched from Christchurch's Hagley Park to the Westfield Riccarton shopping centre, disrupting local traffic.

On 2 July, about 40 TFRC protesters led by Tait gathered in Dunedin's lower Octagon to protest against vaccine mandates, government control, and the Three Waters reform programme.They were confronted by a larger group of 100 counter-protesters affiliated with "AntiFascist Ōtepoti" led by Dudley Benson, who played several queer songs by Lily Allen, ABBA, and Village People on a sound system. Besides Tait, other speakers at the TFRC-sponsored event included University of Otago computer scientist Iain Hewson and anti-transgender activist Jennifer Scott.

On 5 July, the Christchurch City Council dropped its NZ$50,533 traffic management bill against TFRC following a face-to-face meeting with the group's Canterbury leader Tait. The Council's general manager infrastructure Jane Davis agreed to drop the bill on the understanding that TFRC would inform them about any future protest activity that could affect traffic in Christchurch.

=== Post-COVID protests ===
On 22 July 2022, The Freedoms & Rights Coalition announced that they would be staging protest marches in Auckland, Wellington, and Christchurch the following day to protest against what they called "the declining quality of life and the Government's incompetence." The Coalition stated they were protesting against several contemporary problems in New Zealand society including spiraling violence, high living costs, health sector staff shortages and underfunding, the national housing crisis, building and construction material shortages, education problems, a mental health crisis, the over-regulation of the farming sector, and rising inflation and interest rates."

On 23 July, protesters driving vehicles including motorbikes disrupted highway traffic in Auckland and Wellington. Following a speech by Tamaki in the Auckland Domain, 1,000 protesters travelled on the Auckland Southern Motorway to Newmarket. In Wellington, between 100 and 300 protesters gathered in the city's Te Ngākau Civic Square before marching through the streets of the Wellington CBD. Labour MP Willie Jackson criticised the protests as "irresponsible" while Auckland Central Area Commander Inspector Graeme Anderson confirmed that Police were intending to pursue marchers and drivers who had disrupted traffic in Auckland. In mid August, Police subsequently issued the Tamakis and two other individuals with traffic infringement notices for disruption traffic in Auckland.

In early August 2022, TFRC announced that it would be organising a "Kiwi Patriots Day and March" in Auckland on 6 August to express opposition against the Government. Tamaki refused to release plans about the protest march but claimed it would be "impactful." The Coalition also announced that it would hold a similar protest event in Christchurch the following weekend followed by a protest convoy known as the "Mass Parliament clean-out" that would converge on Parliament on 23 August with the goal of petitioning opposition parties to submit a motion of no confidence in the Government. In response to the TFRC's planned Auckland protest, opponent Mark Graham announced that he would be organising a counter-demonstration to "save the nation's democracy." Police confirmed that they would also be liaising with TFRC organisers to minimise disruption to traffic and businesses.

On 6 August, TFRC protesters led by Tamaki gathered at the Auckland Domain for a so-called "patriots day and march." They opposed the Government and called for the lifting of vaccine mandate for health workers. The TFRC protesters were met by a smaller number of counter-demonstrators led by Mark Graham, who staged a "FARC off Brian" counter-demonstration promoting diversity, inclusivity, and defending the Government's public health measures. Police kept peace between the two rival groups and sealed the Southern Motorway's "on and off" ramps at Khyber Pass Road to prevent TFRC protesters from marching onto the highway and disrupting traffic. Protesters dispersed peacefully without disrupting traffic and nearby businesses.

In mid-August 2022, the Coalition proceeded with its plans to hold a three-day nationwide convoy, which would meet outside the New Zealand Parliament in Wellington on 23 August for an anti-government protest. In response to the planned Wellington protest the Police, Wellington City Council and Parliamentary Service employed several measures to prevent a repeat of the 2022 Wellington protest in February and March 2022 including, installing concrete barriers, temporary fencing, and blocking roads around the Parliament precinct. Government departments including the New Zealand Treasury and Ministry of Education encouraged their employees to hide their identification tags and avoid the Parliament precinct for the duration of the protest. The Government also established an operations centre to allow key decision makers to respond to any issues arising from the Wellington protest. According to The New Zealand Herald, hundreds of people from across the country were expected to converge in Wellington on Monday for the protest. A convoy also departed from Onepoto Domain in Auckland's North Shore in the morning of 22 August. The journalist Marc Daalder expressed concern that sovereign citizen activists and the far-right media outlet Counterspin Media would use the Coalition's protest to promote their agendas including calling for the mock trials and executions of politicians.

On 23 August, between 1,500 and 2,000 protesters affiliated with the TFRC led by Tamaki marched from Te Ngākau Civic Square to the Parliamentary grounds. They were met by 500 counter-protesters led by Pōneke Anti-Fascist Coalition, who gathered at the Wellington Cenotaph. Police maintained a strong presence in the Wellington CBD. According to Wellington District Commander Superintendent Corrie Parnell, protesters, counter-protesters and the public were generally well behaved with no reported problems, arrests, or trespass orders being issued. During the Parliament protest, Tamaki launched a new umbrella political party called "Freedoms NZ" which consists of the New Nation Party, Vision New Zealand, and the NZ Outdoors & Freedom Party.

During the 23rd August Parliament protest, Rick Southey, the non-clinical national manager of Whānau Ora Community Clinic (WOCC), officiated over a "mock trial" where he condemned the Government's COVID-19 lockdowns and vaccine mandates as "crimes against humanity." Another participant in the trial was "prosecutor" Heka Robertson. Southey is a member of Destiny Church and had supported Tamaki's protest. Following a complaint by another WOCC staff member, the clinic's director George Ngatai, who is a fellow member of Destiny Church and Vision New Zealand candidate, suspended Southey from his duties pending a review by WOCC chairwoman Leainne Nathan and other representatives, who were not affiliated with Destiny Church.

On 28 September 2023, the TFRC staged a protest march against a scheduled "Agenda 2030" conference at the New Zealand Parliament in Wellington. The conference had been organised by the United Nations Association of New Zealand and featured former Director-General of Health Ashley Bloomfield as its keynote speaker. Due to the Coalition's protest, the conference shifted online. 2,000 TFRC supporters marched from Civic Square to Parliament. Brian and Hannah Tamaki also along with Outdoors Party leader Sue Grey addressed the protesters. Members of the Pōneke Anti-Fascist Coalition staged a counter-protest outside Parliament. The Coalition's march coincided with similar protest activities in Wellington organised by Julian Batchelor's Stop Co-Governance movement, the farming advocacy group Groundswell NZ, and a gang Hīkoi protesting against the National and ACT parties' anti-gang policies. Police monitored the protest events.

On 31 January 2026, Tamaki led about 1,200 TFRC protesters in a protest rally in Victoria Park in Central Auckland. They attempted to march onto Auckland Harbour Bridge but were blocked by a Police cordon at the Fanshawe Street motor ramps.

== Legal issues ==
Tamaki was arrested on 17 January 2022 for breaching bail conditions by participating in the Christchurch anti-lockdown gathering. In response, the TFRC staged a protest march in Auckland's Manukau suburb on 17 January. In addition, several TFRC protesters camped outside the Mount Eden Correctional Facility for nine days until Tamaki's release on 26 January. Tamaki was released after High Court judge Paul Davison overturned the decision to remand him in prison and imposed new bail conditions barring him from supporting future anti-lockdown protests and confining Tamaki to his home under a 24-hour curfew.

In early November 2024 Brian and Hanna Tamaki, and two other defendants faced trial at the Auckland District Court on charges of organising a series of large public gatherings between September and October 2021 in contravention of Level 3 restrictions at the time. Tamaki and his co-defendants were represented by Ron Mansfield KC, who argued that the defendants did not intentionally break lockdown rules and that the group were unfairly targeted by Police. On 20 November Judge June Jelas, with the approval of the Crown prosecutor, dismissed all charges against Tamaki and his co-defendants.
