= Brian Tamaki =

New Zealand evangelical leader

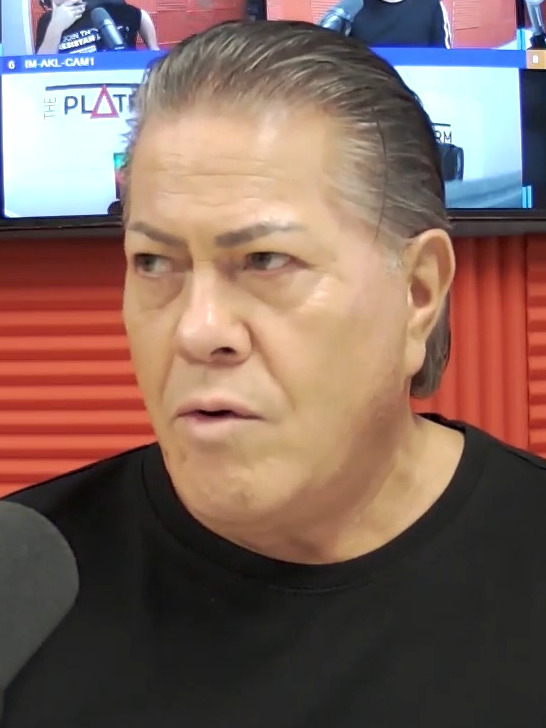
- Tamaki on The Platform in 2022

Personal life
- Born: 2 February 1958 (age 68) Te Awamutu, Waipa County, New Zealand
- Spouse: Hannah Lee (m. 1980)
- Children: 3
- Known for: Founder of Destiny Church; Leader of the Destiny New Zealand Party (2003–2007); Co-Leader of the Freedoms New Zealand (2022–present)

Religious life
- Religion: Christianity
- Denomination: Destiny Church

Brian Raymond Tamaki (born 2 February 1958) is a New Zealand Christian religious leader, and politician. He is the leader of Destiny Church, a Pentecostal Christian organisation that advocates strict adherence to biblical morality. Tamaki has been involved with various fringe political parties and movements, and since 2022 he has led the Freedoms New Zealand party. A perennial candidate, he has run for office several times but has yet to be elected.

Founded by Tamaki in the 1980s, the Destiny Church is known for its position against homosexuality, its patriarchal views, and for its calls for a return to biblical conservative family values and morals. Tamaki has also stated the COVID-19 pandemic is a sign the world has "strayed from God". This, alongside many comments he has made, has made him a controversial figure in New Zealand.

Tamaki's church and his political involvements have pushed a strong campaign that opposes COVID-19 vaccination, lockdowns and mask mandates since the pandemic began in New Zealand, and engaged in protests against mandates at Parliament, including the 2022 Wellington protest. In 2022 Tamaki was briefly imprisoned for breaching bail conditions as he took part in an anti-mandate protest in Christchurch.

== Biography ==
=== Early life ===
In his autobiography Bishop Brian Tamaki: More than meets the eye, Tamaki makes the following statements about his early life:

Born in Te Awamutu as the eldest in a family of five, Tamaki spent his childhood years on the family farm, called "Te Manuka", in the rural area of Te Kopua. His mother was "devoutly religious", taking her sons to the Te Awamutu Methodist Church on Sundays. Tamaki describes his father as an alcoholic who showed no interest in fatherhood. Tamaki is of Tainui ancestry, from the Ngati Ngawaero and Ngāti Maniapoto tribes. During Tamaki's childhood the family moved from the farm to Te Awamutu and then on to Tokoroa in 1970. While in Tokoroa, Tamaki became interested in rugby union and a little later came to enjoy pig-hunting and participating in a rock band playing the pub circuit. Two of Tamaki's brothers, Doug and Mike, are tourism venture operators in Rotorua.

Tamaki dropped out of secondary school at fifteen, after, as he describes in his autobiography, dabbling in drugs, before completing the fourth form and took a labouring job in the forestry industry. In his teens Tamaki began a relationship with Hannah Lee and the unwed couple moved to Te Awamutu, where Tamaki worked on a dairy farm owned by his uncle and aunt. An incident occurred where Lee tried to stab Tamaki to death. It is reported that he had to lock himself in the bathroom but that the blade pierced through the door, nearly wounding him. Tamaki and Lee had their first child, in December 1978. Later at 21, Tamaki joined the Ngāruawāhia Apostolic Church. He lost his farm job and he and Lee returned to Tokoroa, where he attended the Tokoroa Apostolic Church. Tamaki became heavily involved with the church after pastor Manuel Renata baptised him in December 1979. Since Tamaki and his partner had not married, Renata would not allow him to carry out all the functions of the church. Tamaki and Lee then married at the Tokoroa Presbyterian Church on 22 March 1980. Fourteen months later they had their second child, a girl.

=== Destiny Church ===
In 1982 the Tamakis attended the Apostolic Church's Te Nikau Bible College in Paraparaumu, and also had their third child, Samuel. Tamaki became an ordained elder, and then (in September 1984) a pastor in the Tokoroa Apostolic Church. Tamaki went on to establish the Rosetown Community Church in Te Awamutu, the Lake City Church in Rotorua, City Church and then Destiny Church in Auckland.

On 18 June 2005 kaumātua and Destiny Pastor Manuel Renata ordained Tamaki as bishop of the Destiny Church movement (which at the time totalled 15 churches throughout New Zealand and Australia).

Tamaki advocates prosperity theology, which has been criticised as immoral and potentially dangerous.

In 2017 Brian Tamaki and Hannah Tamaki moved into a 234 square metre house in Drury, South Auckland. While it is the residence of Brian Tamaki and his family they are not legally connected to the home and only reside there. In response to criticism that moving into a house of such size was an overreach of his wealth, Tamaki responded "Jealousy is part of the promotion of god".

In mid-April 2018, it was reported that Tamaki had sustained two second-degree burns to his face and body after a botched attempt to burn rubbish. Tamaki announced to members of his congregation that he was recovering and praised his wife and hospital staff for aiding his recovery.

In February 2021, The Otago Daily Times noted that he was being styled "Apostle Bishop" and that church members who paid various fees could be styled "Apostle's Sons".

In late July 2022, it was reported that Tamaki was facing a charge of careless driving after crossing the centre line and colliding with a car carrying two occupants near Rotorua on 6 May 2022. He pleaded guilty to careless driving and was ordered to pay reparations.

== Church and politics ==
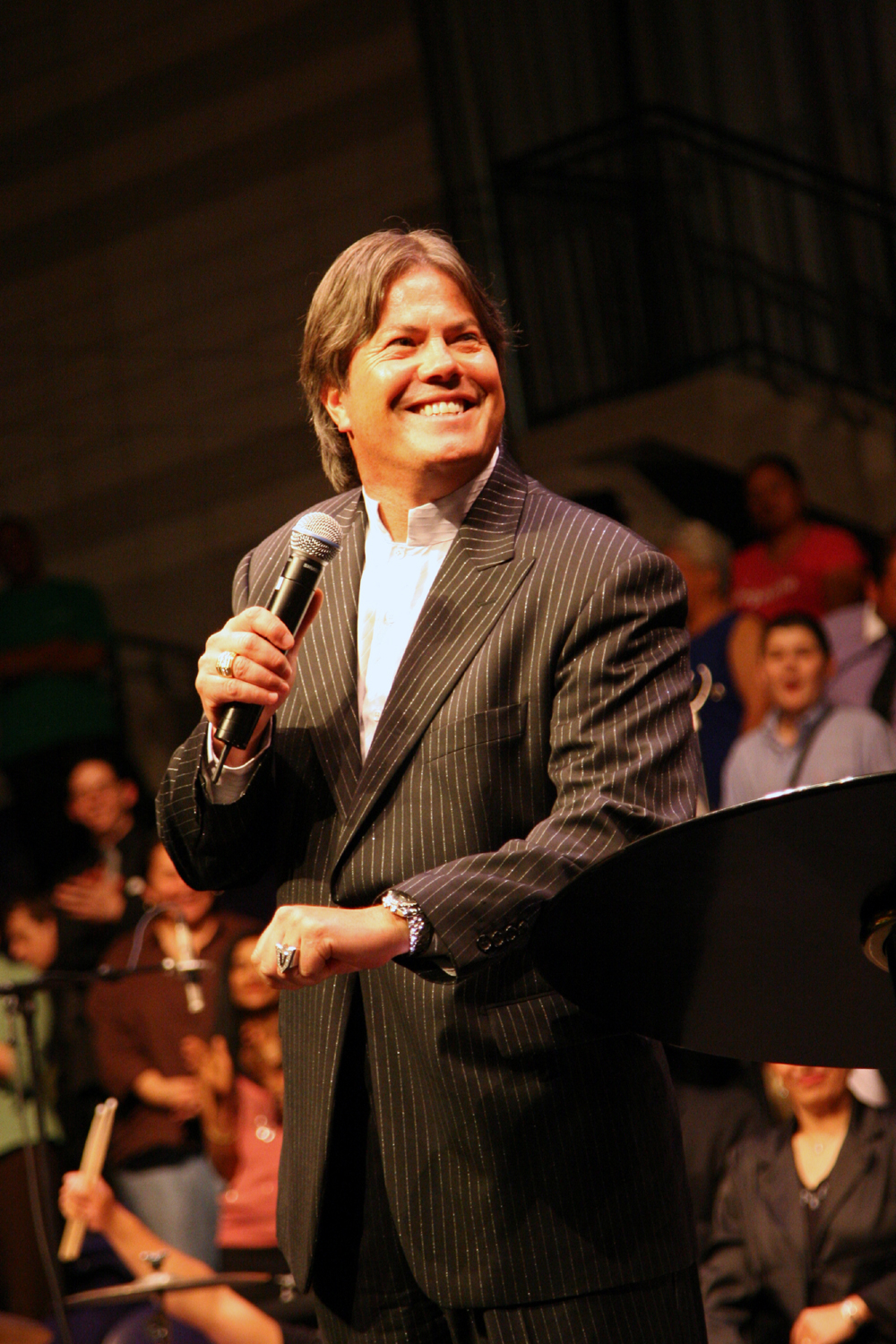
Tamaki preaching at a Destiny Church conference October 2006

In 2004, Tamaki predicted the Destiny Church would be "ruling the nation" before its tenth anniversary in 2008. A year earlier, in 2003, several members of the Destiny Church started the Destiny New Zealand political party, led by Richard Lewis. The party fielded 42 candidates in the 2005 general election, but garnered 0.6 per cent of the vote, short of the 5 per cent threshold required to enter Parliament without winning an electorate seat. None of its candidates came close to being elected.

Destiny New Zealand was promoted by a nationwide tour and DVD labelled "A Nation Under Siege". Tamaki features in the DVD and accompanied the tour. The DVD shows Tamaki decrying what he sees as four problems with New Zealand society: "a Government gone evil, a radical homosexual agenda, the media: a modern day witchcraft" and "the retreat of religion in New Zealand".

In his autobiography Tamaki wrote a chapter titled "Spiritual Father – a long time coming", in which he described meeting "my spiritual father", Eddie Long, in 2002. In October 2003, Long visited New Zealand after Tamaki invited him to address Destiny Church members. Tamaki wrote, "the ease of our connection and the confirmation of a date was entirely in line with Kingdom principle – when God speaks, do it". Long travelled to New Zealand again subsequently and Tamaki usually met him each year at church conferences.

On 23 May 2019 Tamaki launched a new political party, Coalition New Zealand, led by his wife Hannah Tamaki. Coalition New Zealand would not be an explicitly Christian party but would oppose abortion and homosexuality. The name of the party was deemed potentially misleading by the Electoral Commission and was subsequently renamed to Vision New Zealand.

On 23 August 2022 Tamaki launched Freedoms New Zealand, a new umbrella political party which includes the New Nation Party, Vision New Zealand, and the NZ Outdoors & Freedom Party. On 13 May 2023, Tamaki announced that he would contest the 2023 New Zealand general election as the leader of Freedoms New Zealand.

During the 2023 general election held on 14 October, Freedoms NZ failed to get into Parliament, attracting only 9,586 votes (0.33%). Following the release of preliminary results, Tamaki defended the anti-abortion stance of the unsuccessful National Party candidate Simon O'Connor, describing New Zealand Christians as "gutless."

== Media engagement ==
At the Nelson meeting of the Destiny New Zealand "A Nation Under Siege" tour, Tamaki attacked the media, the government, the Green Party and Grey Power (a lobby group for the elderly), referring to the Greens as "pagans", Grey Power as "self centred" and the media as "modern day witchcraft".

In 2004 the Sunday Star-Times reported that Mr Tamaki "hijacked" $450,000 from elderly couple Barry and Marian Wilson. The Wilsons lent the money, which they had received from the sale of nautical clothing label Line7 in the mid-'90s, on the understanding that it was to be used to purchase a block of land in Rotorua for the construction of a church. It was reported that after almost 10 years and countless attempts to contact Mr Tamaki and his wife Hannah, the Wilsons had given up hope of ever recovering the full amount. The Sunday Star-Times asked Mr Tamaki for a response to a series of questions regarding the loan, but he declined to respond.

In 2004 Sunday broadcast a documentary of Tamaki and of the Destiny Church. Dr Philip Culbertson of the University of Auckland said: "As far as I can tell it's a cult".

In July 2005 Tamaki had directed "highly offensive abuse" at Newstalk ZB host Mike Yardley while off-air during an interview on 20 July. In his autobiography Tamaki denies that the abuse happened.

In May 2006 a poll ranked Tamaki the least-trusted of 75 prominent New Zealanders. In June 2006 Tamaki expressed opposition to Sue Bradford's private members Child Discipline Bill, which removed the legal defence of "reasonable force" for prosecutions of parents who have assaulted their children.

In July 2008 TV3 broadcast "Inside New Zealand: The Life of Brian", a documentary by reporter Ross Jennings.

In late April 2025, Tamaki and Destiny's "Man Up" domestic violence programme were the subject of a five-part TVNZ mini-series called Under His Command hosted by broadcaster John Campbell. The series interviewed 22 former and current Destiny Church members, who alleged that the church's Man-Up programme encouraged male domination and tolerated violence against wives. The documentary also alleged that Tamaki utilised rage against the gay, transgender communities and immigrants as a marketing tool.

== Views and controversies ==
=== Cult allegations ===
In a Close Up televised interview on the subject Tamaki denied that his church is a cult, stating that "if we are a cult then the Catholics, the Presbyterians, the Methodists, the Baptists, and the Pentecostals are all cults as well. Because we believe – we have the same actual orthodox tenets of belief."

=== Views on sexuality and marriage ===
Radio Pacific host John Banks aired an interview with Tamaki that attacked a New Zealand AIDS Foundation's takatāpui (Māori for LGBT-person) HIV-prevention project, in which Tamaki referred to traditional Māori pre-colonial intolerance for male homosexuality, painting a picture of a society which, he states, exterminated gay and lesbian people. However, many Māori academic authorities question the basis for this statement.

The broadcasting of Tamaki's preaching against homosexuality on Television New Zealand has led to numerous complaints to the Broadcasting Standards Authority. Television New Zealand pulled the original opening episode of his series Higher Ground, because it "had language and phrases that did not meet industry standards of accuracy, fairness and balance".

Tamaki does not recognise the sex-reassignment surgery of the transgender former MP Georgina Beyer: Tamaki referred to Beyer in his autobiography as a male.

On 16 November 2016, Brian Tamaki drew controversy when he made statements during a sermon that the 2010 and 2011 Christchurch earthquakes were divine retribution for sinful behaviour including murder and homosexuality. These statements preceded the 2016 Kaikōura earthquake by a few hours. Tamaki's comments were condemned by leading New Zealand public figures including the Mayor of Christchurch Bob Parker, Prime Minister John Key, and the Anglican bishop of Dunedin, Kelvin Wright. One Auckland-based critic Aaron Smithson also organised a Change.org petition calling on Prime Minister Key to revoke Destiny Church's tax-free status. On 17 November, Tamaki responded by accusing the media of bias and sensationalising his statements.

On 19 April 2018, Tamaki tweeted his support for Australian rugby union player Israel Folau's comments condemning homosexuality.

In June 2019, he made an 'apology' in front of representatives from the LGBT community who were invited on to stage to share their stories and ask for a bridging of the divide between the LGBT community and the church. He told his South Auckland congregation that he is sorry for any past comments that have offended the gay community, saying that some of his past comments were misinterpreted. But he said that he hasn't changed his beliefs, and doesn't agree with homosexual acts. This apology came only one week after his wife launched a political party Vision NZ (then called Coalition New Zealand).

=== Views on women in politics ===
Tamaki regards the perceived lack of male leadership in New Zealand, including the leadership over one's family, as "the work of the devil". According to Tamaki, Parliament reflects this alleged lack of male leadership. In his autobiography he defends his attitude towards women by pointing to the role of his wife Pastor Hannah Tamaki in the Destiny Church organisation, and also says "God is very specific about the role and function of men". He has also said that he wants to appoint a Minister for Men.

Trans woman MP Georgina Beyer confronted Tamaki at the "Enough is Enough" protest in Wellington in August 2004, charging "Your hatred is totally intolerable". Beyer also compared Tamaki to despots like Robert Mugabe in a 3 News interview.

=== Views on Islam ===
Following the Christchurch mosque shootings in March 2019, Brian Tamaki issued a Tweet protesting at Prime Minister Jacinda Ardern's decision to hold an Islamic call to prayer ahead of the two minutes of silence being held for the victims of the Christchurch shootings on 22 March 2019. Tamaki also made remarks attacking Islam as a "false religion".

=== Responses to the COVID-19 pandemic ===
During the COVID-19 pandemic in New Zealand, Tamaki courted media attention and controversy in mid-March 2020 when he announced that Destiny Church would not be closing their churches in response to Government directives discouraging gatherings of more than 100 people. Tamaki stated that he was "not about to let a filthy virus scare us out of having church. To equate fear with common sense is nonsense." He said that "... very ignorant Kiwis don't even realise their rights have been stolen". Tamaki's remarks were criticised by infectious diseases expert Siouxsie Wiles for undermining COVID-19 containment efforts." While Destiny Church held services on 22 March, they subsequently shifted to online services to comply with national lockdown restrictions.

In mid-2020, Tamaki criticised the Government's alert level two restrictions limiting religious services to 10 people. Describing the Government as "controlling parents," Tamaki announced that Destiny Church would be holding services in defiance of lockdown regulations and also called upon other New Zealand churches to join him in opposing these restrictions.

In early March 2021, Tamaki and his wife Hannah attracted media coverage and public criticism after they left Auckland during a Level 3 lockdown and visited Rotorua in the North Island and Te Anau in the South Island, which were both under a Level 2 lockdown. The COVID-19 Response Minister Chris Hipkins described the Tamakis' actions as "completely irresponsible." The Mayor of Invercargill Tim Shadbolt stated that the Tamakis were not welcome in the South Island city. That same month, Tamaki had defended Hannah's Facebook post stating that she would not take any COVID-19 vaccine, declaring they were not "anti-vaxxers" or conspiracy theorists.

On 2 October 2021, Tamaki along with The Freedoms & Rights Coalition (TFRC) staged an anti-lockdown protest outside the Auckland War Memorial Museum in the Auckland Domain. The protests attracted thousands of demonstrators, including gang members on motorbikes, young children and elderly, many of whom were not following social distancing rules or wearing masks. The protesters were criticised for flouting lockdown restrictions and endangering public health by ACT Party leader David Seymour, Auckland Council councillors Jo Bartley and Richard Hills, and Jacinda Ardern.

The New Zealand Police's delay in laying charges against Tamaki drew criticism, with a Change.org petition calling for his prosecution attracting 65,000 signatures by 4 October. On 5 October, Tamaki was charged with breaching the COVID-19 Public Health Response Act 2020 and Alert Level 3 restrictions in relation to organising the protest. He appeared in court by video link on 12 October and pleaded not guilty. He was remanded on bail until a further appearance in January 2022. He was also banned from attending protests in breach of anti-COVID restrictions and from using the internet to encourage non-compliance.

Tamaki attended an anti-lockdown protest in Auckland on 16 October and was subsequently arrested for breach of bail conditions.

In early November 2021, Stuff identified Brian Tamaki as the "founder and architect" of the anti-lockdown "The Freedom and Rights Coalition" (TFRC) protest movement, which had organised nationwide anti-lockdown and anti-vaccination protests. The Stuff report also identified Jenny Marshall, Destiny Church's director of operations and Tamaki's assistant, as the owner of TFRC's web domain. Marshall confirmed that Tamaki was the leader of the TFRC but stated that the Coalition's merchandising and donations were separate from the Church's finances. In addition, Stuff reported that Brian and Hannah Tamaki maintained links with Groundswell NZ's Pukekohe and Auckland coordinator Scott Bright, who donated vegetables to the TFRC and participated in an anti-lockdown protest in his personal capacity.

On 23 November, Brian and Hannah Tamaki were summoned to the Auckland Central Police station for attending the Auckland Domain protest held on 20 November in breach of the form's bail conditions. In response, 100 supporters gathered outside the Police station in solidarity with the Tamakis. Brian denied breaching bail conditions and criticised the Government's COVID-19 Protection Framework. Auckland District Court Judge Steve Bonnar altered Tamaki's bail conditions to explicitly bar him from the Auckland Domain and from speaking at gatherings deemed unlawful by law enforcement authorities. Following an appeal, High Court Justice Geoffrey Venning allowed Tamaki to visit the Auckland Domain and Auckland Museum for recreational purposes but not protests. Tamaki was scheduled to face trial in April 2022.

On 27 December, the Police launched another investigation of Tamaki after he threatened to blow up mobile vaccination clinics in opposition to the rollout of COVID-19 vaccines to children between the ages of 5 and 11. According to The New Zealand Herald, Tamaki had made this alleged threat during a sermon held on 26 December, which was uploaded on Destiny Church's website.

On 8 January 2022, Tamaki addressed an anti-lockdown and anti-vaccine mandate rally in Christchurch's Hagley Park, which he described as a "family picnic" rather than a protest. In response, Police launched an investigation into whether Tamaki had breached his bail conditions.

On 17 January 2022, Tamaki was arrested for allegedly breaching his bail conditions. Police have previously stated they were investigating an anti-vaccine mandate rally held at Christchurch's Hagley Park on 8 January. Tamaki is not allowed to "organise or attend" any protest encouraging non-compliance with the Covid-19 Public Health Response Act 2020. In response, Tamaki denounced the arrest and commented that he was a political prisoner. Tamaki was remanded in custody for ten days for allegedly breaching his bail conditions by attending the Christchurch protest.

Supporters from Destiny Church and the Freedom and Rights Coalition camped outside Mount Eden Corrections Facility for several days. On 22 January 2022, six pastors including City Impact Church pastor Peter Mortlock and pastors from the Grace Churches in Gisborne, Tauranga, and Rotorua, Auckland's Covenant Church and South City Reformed Baptist Church objected to Tamaki's imprisonment, writing that he had been silenced for his dissenting views. Following nine days of imprisonment, High Court judge Paul Davison ruled in favour of Tamaki's appeal that the decision to remand him in prison was wrong. Davison granted Tamaki bail but barred him from attending, organising, supporting and speaking at future anti-lockdown protests and ordered him to reside at home on a 24 hour curfew.

In early November 2024 Tamaki, his wife, his executive, and one other man faced trial at the Auckland District Court on charges of organising a series of large public gatherings between September and October 2021 in contravention of Level 3 restrictions at the time. Tamaki and his co-defendants were defended by Ron Mansfield KC, who argued that the defendants did not intentionally break lockdown rules and that the group were unfairly targeted by Police. In mid-November, Judge June Jelas agreed to dismiss all charges except two against Tamaki and two against a second co-defendant. On 20 November Jelas, with the approval of the Crown prosecutor, dismissed the remaining charges against Tamaki and the co-defendant.

=== TFRC protests ===
On 23 July, Tamaki's Freedom and Rights Coalition staged protests in Auckland, Wellington and Christchurch to protest against various problems in New Zealand society including rising living costs, violence, housing shortages, healthcare sector strains, and excessive government farming regulations. Tamaki addressed protesters in the Auckland Domain. Protesters disrupted traffic in Auckland and Wellington. Following the 23 July protests, Tamaki announced plans to establish a new coalition with three minor parties to contest the 2023 New Zealand general election. On 16 August, Tamaki and his wife Hannah were issued with traffic infringement notices for causing traffic disruption during the 23 July Auckland protest.

On 6 August, Tamaki led another TFRC protest known as the "patriots day and march" at the Auckland Domain. The TFRC protesters were met by counter-demonstrators led by Mark Graham. Police kept peace between the two rival groups and sealed the Southern Motorway's ramps at Khyber Pass Road to prevent TFRC protesters from marching onto the highway and disrupting traffic.

On 23 August, Tamaki led a protest march outside the New Zealand Parliament in Wellington, which attracted between 1,500 and 2,000 protesters. They were met by 500 counter-protesters led by Pōneke Anti-Fascist Coalition. According to Wellington District Commander Superintendent Corrie Parnell, protesters, counter-protesters and the public were generally well behaved with no reported problems, arrests, or trespass orders being issued. During the Parliament protest, Tamaki launched a new umbrella political party called "Freedoms NZ" which consists of the New Nation Party, Vision New Zealand, and the NZ Outdoors & Freedom Party.

On 28 September 2023, Tamaki and his wife Hannah led a TFRC protest against a scheduled "Agenda 2030" conference at the New Zealand Parliament in Wellington. They along with Outdoors Party leader Sue Grey addressed the protesters. Members of the Pōneke Anti-Fascist Coalition staged a counter-protest outside Parliament. The Coalition's march coincided with similar protest activities in Wellington organised by Julian Batchelor's Stop Co-Governance movement, the farming advocacy group Groundswell NZ, and a gang hīkoi protesting against the National and ACT parties' anti-gang policies.

On 31 January 2026, Tamaki addressed 1,200 TFRC protesters during a rally in Victoria Park in Central Auckland. They attempted to march on the Auckland Harbour Bridge but were blocked by a Police cordon at the Fanshawe Street motor ramps.

=== Response to Cyclone Gabrielle ===
In March 2023, Tamaki blamed pornography, abortion, and gay rights for the devastation in the eastern North Island caused by Cyclone Gabrielle. Tamaki made these statements during an hour long sermon based on the Old Testament Book of Leviticus. He stated that Gisborne and Hastings had the highest number of pornography consumers in New Zealand. Tamaki's remarks were condemned by Mayor of Gisborne Rehette Stoltz, who described them as "disappointing, unhelpful and laughable."

=== 2023 Israel-Gaza war ===
During the Gaza war, Tamaki led a pro-Israel rally outside the grounds of the New Zealand Parliament on 7 December, which attracted 400 supporters. Tamaki's group opposed calls for a ceasefire and submitted a petition to ACT MP Simon Court calling for Hamas and Hezbollah to be classified as a terror organisations and for sympathetic Members of Parliament to be expelled. In response, members of the Poneke Anti-Fascist Coalition staged a counter-protest outside the Supreme Court building in Lambton Quay.

=== Views on drag story events ===
In mid-March 2024, Tamaki opposed two proposed Drag Queen Story Hour events at Rotorua and Hastings's municipal libraries. Due to anti-drag queen opposition, these story events were cancelled. On 26 March, members of Destiny Church protested outside another drag storytime event at Gisborne's library, who also painted over a rainbow crossing.

On 15 April 2024, Ford O'Connor, a member of Destiny Church who is married to Tamaki's granddaughter, pleaded guilty to vandalising the Karangahape Road rainbow crossing in Auckland in late March 2024 and was fined $16,093 to cover the repair costs. During the sentencing, Tamaki defended O'Connor, saying that "he undertook a political protest against the excessive rainbow-washing that is occurring across New Zealand right now, at the expense of our taxpayers and our ratepayers." In mid-May 2024, Tamaki admitted responsibility for instructing his followers to vandalise the rainbow pedestrian crossing in Gisborne.

On 27 June 2024, Tamaki, Destiny Church's trustees and several pastors were sued by drag performers Sunita Torrance and Daniel Lockett for inducing breach of contract, conspiracy to injure, unlawful means conspiracy, and defamation in relation to the disruption of their drag story events. In response, Destiny Church said it would continue to advocate for children's well-being and accused the New Zealand Herald of promoting crowdfunding for the drag performers' legal case.

=== Transgender issues ===
On 5 May 2024, Tamaki denounced the use of puberty blockers for transgender children and youth people undergoing transitioning, according to Tamaki they were causing "irreversible damage." He also opposed the appointment of Dr Sue Bagshaw as the Government's lead investigator on the review of puberty blockers' suitability in New Zealand. The following day, he and Pastor Derek Tait led a protest by Destiny Church members against Te Tahi Youth health service in Christchurch, which helps transgender people access healthcare. Destiny supporters were met by counter-protesters while Police monitored the event. During a heated altercation, a teddy bear was thrown at Tamaki's car.

On 14 May 2024, The New Zealand Herald reported that Tamaki was scheduled to speak at the upcoming "UNSILENCED: Middle New Zealand on ideology" at Wellington's Tākina convention centre on 18 May alongside Family First New Zealand leader Bob McCoskrie and former National Party MP Simon O'Connor. The Convention Centre is owned and operated by Te Papa Museum and Wellington City Council. Protest groups Queer Endurance In Defiance and the Pōneke Anti-Fascist Coalition denounced the conference for allegedly promoting transphobia and said it was contacting the Council in order to cancel the event on safety grounds. While Wellington City Council Māori Ward Councillor Nīkau Wi Neera called for the event's cancellation, Free Speech Union chief executive Jonathan Ayling defended the conference on free speech grounds.

Following a safety review, Te Papa allowed the event to proceed, but said it would monitor the situation and expressed support for the LGBT community. Tamaki spoke at the Unsilenced conference, which was organised by Inflection Point NZ. O'Connor and British activist Kellie-Jay Keen-Minshull (who participated via video-link) also spoke at the conference. 360 people attended the Unsilenced conference. A protest organised by Pōneke Anti-Fascist Coalition and Queer Endurance in Defiance attracted 500 people. A protester also released a bottle containing a foul-smelling substance outside the Convention Centre.

=== Race relations and multiculturalism ===
On 16 November 2024, Tamaki led a "Make New Zealand Great Again" motor rally in Auckland on 16 November in opposition to the Hīkoi mō te Tiriti. The group carried New Zealand flags, which they said was in opposition to the "divisive" Māori sovereignty flags of the Hīkoi to Parliament. The Make NZ Great Again rally caused traffic disruption on New Zealand State Highway 1 after several participants exited their vehicles and marched on the motorway. A spokesperson denied that Tamaki organised the rally. Tamaki also criticised Te Pāti Māori MP Hana-Rawhiti Maipi-Clarke's haka against the first reading of the Treaty Principles Bill in Parliament, describing it as a "Māori meltdown."

On 21 June 2025, Tamaki led a Destiny Church march in Auckland's Aotea Square called "Faith, Flag and Family,” which opposed the spread of non-Christian religions and immigration in New Zealand. Tamaki and his supporters denounced the Muslim, Buddhist, Hindus, Sikh and Palestinian communities, burning flags representing those communities. Pro-Palestinian counter-demonstrators also gathered in Aotea Square, with Police separating the two groups.

In September 2025, Tamaki led a contingent of 200 protesters from Australia and New Zealand who participated in British far right activist Tommy Robinson's Unite the Kingdom rally, which was attended by 100,000 people. Tamaki and his team also performed a haka in tribute to the deceased Turning Point USA founder Charlie Kirk.

On 17 June 2026, Tamaki made remarks in a Facebook video calling for the expulsion of Hindus, Sikhs and Muslims from New Zealand in response to allegations that Indian Prime Minister Narendra Modi was purging Indian Christians and burning down churches. Minister for Ethnic Communities Mark Mitchell condemned Tamaki's remarks as inflammatory and reassured Indian New Zealanders and the wider ethnic communities that the Government would prioritise their safety and wellbeing. He also confirmed that Police were assessing Tamaki's remarks against the threshold of the Human Rights Act 1993. Tamaki's remarks were also condemned by the Federation of Islamic Associations of New Zealand, the New Zealand Central Sikh Association and the Race Relations Commissioner Melissa Derby. In response to criticism, Tamaki defended his remarks, saying that the New Zealand government did not allow New Zealanders a vote on the recent New Zealand-India Free Trade Agreement and "mass migration." He also said that New Zealand had the "right to speak openly about human rights abuses, religious persecution, immigration, foreign policy and the future direction of our country."

In mid-October 2026, Tamaki was charged with three counts of inciting racial disharmony under the Human Rights Act in relation to his social media posts in June 2026. In response, Tamaki denied the charges and claimed that the prosecution was "politically motivated." On 19 October, Tamaki appeared in the Manukau District Court where he pleaded not guilty to the three charges of inciting racial disharmony. On 20 October, Tamaki was denied entry into Australia by the Australian Border Force in response to "inflammatory" social media comments. He had accompanied his family on a flight to Brisbane, where he was scheduled to address a Destiny Church conference there.

=== Confiscation of firearms ===
On 30 June 2026, Police confiscated Tamaki's hunting firearms, having temporarily revoked his firearms licenses two days earlier. Tamaki released footage of the Police visit in a Facebook video and attributed the confiscation of his firearms to his earlier remarks about purging non-Christian migrants and a podcast remark about using his shotgun to defend his family. Police Superintendent Shanan Gray confirmed that Police had served a temporary firearms suspension notice at an Auckland property while the firearms regulator investigated whether the licence holder remained "fit and proper to possess a firearm." Deputy Prime Minister David Seymour defended the Police response and process, describing Tamaki as a "dickhead." ACT MP Parmjeet Parmar subsequently confirmed that she had written to the Police Commissioner the previous week asking Police to investigate whether Tamaki's broke the law over his social media remarks about purging non-Christians. She believed that his remarks "cross the line" and could "incite crime." Tamaki's wife Hannah Tamaki vowed that Tamaki would continue hunting despite the Police suspension of his firearms. In early August 2026, Tamaki confirmed that Police had revoked his firearms license due to his public and social media statements.

=== 2026 alleged threatening video investigation ===
In early August 2026, the Police launched an investigation after Tamaki posted a video calling upon several government agencies including the Police and Inland Revenue Department, political parties, media organisations and other religious communities to repent or face divine retribution.

== Publications ==
- A Nation under Siege: A social disaster has hit our nation (2005) Directed by J Cardno. Rated M. DVD format.
- Tamaki, Brian (2006). Bishop Brian Tamaki: More than meets the eye. Auckland: Tamaki Publications, Destiny Churches New Zealand. ISBN 0-473-11242-6
