= Margaret Agee =

New Zealand mental health researcher

- Awards: Officer of the New Zealand Order of Merit

Academic work
- Institutions: University of Auckland

Margaret Rosemary Nelson Agee ONZM is a New Zealand mental health counsellor and academic. In 2014 Agee was appointed an Officer of the New Zealand Order of Merit for services to mental health education.

== Academic career ==
Agee completed a Bachelor of Arts and a Master of English at the University of Auckland. While at university she visited a guidance counsellor for help with stress and confidence, and found it so helpful she described developing "an almost missionary zeal" for counselling. The career path for counselling at the time involved working as a teacher first, for around five years. Agee trained as a teacher, and then taught English and social studies at Auckland Girls' Grammar School. Agee was then appointed to Aorere College, where she was first junior counsellor and then head of guidance. She was appointed as a lecturer at the University of Auckland in 1990, where she later completed a PhD. One of Agee's doctoral students is the first Pacific person to graduate with a PhD in counselling from Auckland, Toleafoa Sarah Sala Va'afusuaga McRobie.

Agee lectures in professional supervision, and also researches on loss and grief. Agee has been actively involved with the National Association for Loss and Grief, and was a founding member and serves on the board of the Grief Centre. Agee was a member of the International Work Group on Death, Dying and Bereavement.

Agee has co-edited three books and is on the editorial board of the New Zealand Journal of Counselling.

== Honours and awards ==
In the 2014 New Year's Honours Agee was appointed an Officer of the New Zealand Order of Merit for services to mental health education. She is a Life Member of the New Zealand Association of Counsellors.

== Selected works ==
- Agee, Margaret Nelson; McIntosh, Tracey; Culbertson, Philip; 'Ofa Makasiale, Cabrini, eds. (15 October 2012). Pacific Identities and Well-Being: Cross-Cultural Perspectives. New York: Routledge. doi:10.4324/9780203113578. ISBN 9780203113578.
- Chubb, Laura; Fouché, Christa B.; Agee, Margaret Rosemary Nelson; Thompson, Andrew (2021). "'Being there': technology to reduce isolation for young people with significant illness". International Journal of Inclusive Education: 1–18. doi:10.1080/13603116.2021.1916106. Wikidata Q117306229.
- Dickinson, Pauline; Neilson, Glenda; Agee, Margaret Rosemary Nelson (2004). "The Sustainability of Mentally Healthy Schools Initiatives: Insights from the Experiences of a Co - Educational Secondary School in Aotearoa/New Zealand". International Journal of Mental Health Promotion. 6 (2): 34–39. doi:10.1080/14623730.2004.9721929. Wikidata Q130384559.
- Everts, Johannes; Agee, Margaret Rosemary Nelson (1994). "Including spirituality in counsellor education: Issues for consideration, with illustrative reference to a New Zealand example". International Journal for the Advancement of Counselling. 17 (4): 291–302. doi:10.1007/bf01407745. Wikidata Q130384560.
