= COVID-19 protests in New Zealand =

Protests against the COVID-19 mandates, lockdowns and restrictions in New Zealand

- Part of protests over responses to the COVID-19 pandemic
- Date: 13 August 2020 – 30 November 2022
- Location: New Zealand
- Caused by: Opposition to COVID-19 lockdowns and restrictions and, in 2021, workplace vaccination mandates
- Methods: Protests, demonstrations

Cities that have had reported demonstrations.

There were several COVID-19 protests in New Zealand held during the period of COVID-19 restrictions from 2020 to 2022, where people protested the government's response to the COVID-19 pandemic in New Zealand, in particular the lockdown measures in place in March–May 2020, August 2020, and August–November 2021 and the later vaccine mandates. The protests were largely condemned by members of parliament, as well as local city and regional councils. Fears were also raised about the protests increasing the spread of the virus.

== 2020 ==
=== 13 August ===
On 13 August 2020, FACTS NZ and Kotahitanga Movement Aotearoa organised an anti-lockdown protest, that was attended by 60 people including Advance New Zealand co-leader and New Zealand Public Party leader Billy Te Kahika. The two groups held separate marches walking from Forum North to the Whangārei police station, when they arrived at the police station both groups delivered speeches in regard to the COVID-19 alert levels, Nationwide and Auckland lockdown(s). Afterwards the two groups combined and continued their demonstration walking along Walton and Dent Street which resulted in cars being stopped at traffic lights and roundabouts. There have been no known arrests in relation to this demonstration, however there was a police presence monitoring the protests to ensure they remained peaceful.

=== 22 August ===
On 22 August 2020 in Aotea Square, Auckland there was a COVID-19 anti-lockdown, anti-vaccination, anti-5G and anti-1080 protest organised by NZ Liberty March in which 150 people attended, the protest was peaceful and there were no significant issues or arrests made. The demonstrators used the handling of COVID-19 in Sweden as an example as what New Zealand should have done, discrediting those who said its handling of COVID-19 was horrible and criticised the government's lockdown policy. Some attendees also made health claims regarding COVID-19 but did not elaborate. A minimal amount of attendees wore masks, however all attendees stuck to those that resided with them keeping distance between protestors that did not reside with them.

=== 29 August ===
On 29 August 2020 in Aotea Square, Auckland there was an anti-lockdown, COVID-19 denying, anti-vaccination, anti-United Nations protest, in which 500 people attended including Advance NZ co-leader Jami-Lee Ross and New Conservative Party deputy leader Elliot Ikilei. Most protestors did not wear masks or adhere to social distancing requirements.

=== 5 September ===
On 5 September, several anti-lockdown protests were held throughout the country including Auckland, Whangārei, Wellington, New Plymouth, Tauranga, Rotorua, Nelson and Christchurch. The protest in Auckland's Aotea Square was organised by the NZ Liberty Movement, whose Facebook page reported 500 participants. The Auckland protest breached the Alert Level 2.5 ban on gatherings above ten people. In Rotorua, protesters, many of them claiming to be from the Advanced NZ party, gathered at Te Manawa, the intersection of Hinemoa and Tutanekai Streets. Some participants objected to wearing masks while others highlighted the financial and emotional damage caused by the lockdown.'

=== 12 September ===
On 12 September 2020, anti-lockdown, COVID-19 denying protestors again marched from Aotea Square in Auckland. The protest was organised by Advance New Zealand co-leader Billy Te Kahika who dubbed it the 'National Rally for Freedom'. It is estimated that over 1,000 protestors were in attendance, including Jami-Lee Ross, Advance New Zealand's other co-leader. Many signs labelled New Zealand a police state. Other protestors carried signs unrelated to COVID-19, including some advocating against vaccines and 5G.

=== 10 October ===
On 10 October, the Advance NZ party staged a "Rally for your Future" in Auckland's Aotea Square. The party's leader Jami-Lee Ross gave a speech claiming that New Zealand's freedoms were being eroded "in the name of the virus" and calling for people to vote for Advance NZ. Several signs read "COVID=Nazi Nexus" and that "Children are not for sale." The NZ Liberty Movement, which had previously organised rallies with Advance NZ, did not participate in the "Rally for your Future" due to a breakdown in communication and coordination with the latter.

== 2021 ==
=== 14 January ===
On 14 January, Te Kahika led a "freedom rally" outside the New Zealand Parliament opposing the Government's COVID-19 lockdown policies that was attended by between 100 and 150 people. Rally participants also sported banners and signs expressing support for US President Donald Trump and attacking 1080 usage, water fluoridation, the Chinese Communist Party, and the United Nations.

=== 18 August ===
On 18 August, Te Kahika led a 100-strong anti-lockdown protest outside the TVNZ building to oppose the Government's recent decision to move the country to Alert Level 4 following a community case that was reported on 17 August. Many of the protesters reportedly did not wear masks. Te Kahika was detained by Police 43 minutes into the rally. He cooperated with the authorities to minimise the risk of supporters causing trouble. One demonstrator urged shopkeepers to keep their businesses open in defiance of lockdown restrictions limiting business operations to essential services. Police reported that they had arrested four people in Auckland for breaching the Health Act notice.

In addition, other anti-lockdown protests were staged outside the local police stations in Nelson and Tauranga. Four people were arrested in Tauranga.

=== 19 August ===
On 19 August 2021, far right activist Kyle Chapman and two other individuals staged a small anti-lockdown rally at Christchurch's Bridge of Remembrance on 19 August. The trio appeared in the Christchurch District Court the following day on charges of breaching lockdown restrictions under the COVID-19 Public Health Response Act 2020.

=== 2 October ===
An anti-lockdown protest outside the Auckland War Memorial Museum in the Auckland Domain, organised by "The Freedoms & Rights Coalition" (TFRC) alongside Bishop Brian Tamaki, the leader of Destiny Church (who is a member of the TFRC). Estimates of attendance range from hundreds to two thousand people. The crowd included gang members on motorbikes, young children and elderly, many of whom were not following social distancing rules or wearing masks. The protesters were criticised for flouting lockdown restrictions and endangering public health by ACT Party leader David Seymour and Auckland Council councillors Jo Bartley and Richard Hills. Bartley and Hills also criticised the Police for not arresting demonstrators or issuing fines.

Jacinda Ardern condemned the protest as a "slap in the face for the Aucklanders who have sacrificed their freedom to keep others in the city safe." In addition, a Change.org petition calling for his prosecution drew over 150,000 signatories. Tamaki was charged in relation to organising the protest and appeared in court via video-link on 12 October and was bailed to January 2022 under conditions. In mid-December 2021, The New Zealand Herald reported that Tamaki had ignored text messages from Deputy Police Commissioner Wally Haumaha urging him to ensure that the crowd practised social distancing.

That same day, a "Families Freedom Picnic" was held at Dunedin's Queens Gardens. The protest was attended by 100 people including Dunedin City councillor Lee Vandervis, who talked about the effects of lockdown regulations on local businesses, freedom of speech and the pressure to be vaccinated. According to local police, participants were peaceful and maintained social distancing of two metres.

=== 16 October ===
An estimated 2000 people congregated at the Auckland Domain and 1000 gathered at Kensington Park in Whangārei protesting the alert level restrictions. Destiny Church leader Brian Tamaki was present at the Auckland protest. In addition, other outdoor "Freedom protests" were planned for Mount Maunganui, Whakatāne, Gisborne, Havelock North, Wellington, Nelson and Christchurch. Police stated they would be prosecuting the organisers.

Tamaki was arrested on 20 October for breaching the bail conditions put in place after the previous protest and for breaching Alert Level 3 restrictions. In addition, Police laid charges against three other men for organising protests in Whangarei and Hamilton.

=== Sovereign Hīkoi of Truth ===
In late October 2021, the self-proclaimed "Sovereign Hīkoi of Truth" (SHOT) Movement announced that they would travel from Rotorua on midnight 27 October to Waitangi via the Waikato-Auckland border to protest lockdown restrictions in the Auckland and Waikato regions. The hīkoi (or protest march) was condemned by several Māori leaders including former Māori Party president and Ngāti Whātua leader Dame Rangimārie Naida Glavish and former Te Tai Tokerau Member of Parliament Hone Harawira for violating lockdown restrictions and promoting anti-vaccination views. One of the Waikato speakers was New Zealand Outdoors Party co-leader Sue Grey, who has espoused anti-vaccination and anti-5G views.

Protest participants were stopped by a police checkpoint near Mercer, a village near Auckland's southern border. Police objected to the convoy citing a health order restricting travel across the Auckland boundary. Participants subsequently camped by the side of the road. The presence of the protest participants created a traffic jam near the Auckland Southern Motorway. Speaker Grey objected to the police decision to block the protesters. In response, Mayor of Waikato Allan Sanson urged the protesters to return home, pointing out they had breached travel restrictions by travelling from Rotorua (which is under Level 2 restrictions) to Waikato (which is under Level 3 restrictions).

On 27 October, 2,000 SHOT protesters converged on Waitangi in solidarity with the Northland-bound anti-lockdown hīkoi that was blocked by Police at Auckland's southern border. While most of the local marae leaders objected to the presence of the SHOT protesters, they felt obliged by Māori custom to show manaakitanga (hospitality) to the visitors. The New Zealand Police deployed personnel including iwi liaison officers to assist with general policing and crowd control.

=== 30 October ===
On 30 October 2021, an estimated 5,000 people marched from the Auckland Domain to streets in East Auckland for 90 minutes to protest the ongoing lockdown. In attendance was Hannah Tamaki, wife of Brian Tamaki, the latter of whom was arrested at a previous protest. Police supervised the event. Auckland Police have confirmed they will be prosecuting the organisers for breaching Level 3 restrictions.

That same day, Freedom Day protests were also held in the South Island cities of Nelson and Timaru. The Nelson protest was organised by Destiny Church Nelson Pastor Martin Daly and attracted a thousand people. Speakers spoke on a range of topics including abortion, the Government, 5G and the COVID-19 vaccination programme. In Timaru, several hundred protesters gathered at the Piazza at Caroline Bay before marching towards State Highway 1 and terminating at Strathallan Corner in the Timaru CBD. Many participants at both protests did not wear masks or practise social distancing. Police indicated that they were investigating both protests to determine whether to pursue prosecution.

=== 2 November ===
On 2 November, two individuals heckled Ardern's news conference in the Northland Region, questioning the effectiveness of COVID-19 vaccines and accusing her of lying about the death of a vaccinated individual. One of the individuals was Shane Chafin, a correspondent for the far-right talk show Counterspin Media affiliated with Stephen Bannon's GTV Media Group. Chafin also accused the mainstream media of perpetuating "fake news." In response, Ardern suspended the press conference.

=== 3 November ===
On 3 November 2021, a crowd of 250 protesters picketed Ardern's media briefing outside a vaccination centre in Whanganui, forcing her staff to move the news conference to a different location. Protesters also confronted media, accusing journalists of being paid off by the Government. There was a significant police presence at the Whanganui protest. Protesters held placards criticising vaccine mandates, lockdown restrictions, and the controversial Three Waters reform programme. Protesters in nearby Hunterville forced the Prime Minister to abandon her plan to visit the town's vaccination clinic.

=== 6 November ===
On 6 November, 20–30 members of the Voices for Freedom group staged a protest in Dunedin's Cumberland Street near the University of Otago's Dunedin campus. Participants held signs asking passing vehicles to "toot for freedom". Voices for Freedom Dunedin coordinator Tracey Pita said the protesters were demonstrating against vaccine mandates for healthcare, education and corrections workers.

=== 9 November ===
On 9 November, several anti-lockdown protests were held across the country including Wellington and Auckland to protest against the Government's COVID-19 lockdown restrictions and vaccine mandates. Protest organisers have also called for Auckland's borders to be reopened, the whole country to move down to Alert Level 1, and for New Zealand to "learn to live with the virus". Police have warned protesters to stick to the law or face prosecution. In response to the protests, Prime Minister Ardern stated that the protesters were not "representative of the vast bulk of New Zealanders." Opposition leader Judith Collins stated that National Party MPs would not be meeting the demonstrators, describing the Wellington protest as an anti-vaccination protest that they did not want to be associated with.

Thousands of people marched to Parliament in Wellington to protest COVID-19 lockdown restrictions and vaccine mandates. The protest was organised by The Freedoms & Rights Coalition (TFRC). Protest participants include young and old, and a diverse mix of ethnicities. Protest signs range from anti-vaccine to "Trump 2020", alongside tino rangatiratanga and United Tribes flags. The Wellington protest disrupted traffic in the Wellington Central. Parliament's main entrances were locked down by Police and security guards. The Wellington protest included a group of teachers and a principal from Whakatāne who opposed the Government's vaccine mandate and did not trust the Pfizer-BioNTech COVID-19 vaccine. According to the media company Stuff, one of their photographers was grabbed and pushed by demonstrators during the Wellington protest.

The same day, an estimated 50 people blocked a border crossing north of Auckland on State Highway One at Te Hana. Several vehicles were towed to clear the road. One protester assaulted a police officer. Police subsequently "deescalated" the situation and cleared the road. Te Rūnanga ō Ngāti Whātua leader and chief operating officer Antony Thompson criticised the anti-lockdown protesters for disrupting trucks carrying food and medical supplies headed for the Northland Region.

In Tauranga, 100 people gathered at the corner of Elizabeth St and Cameron Rd with flags and banners calling for the Government to halt the vaccine mandate. The protest was organised via social media with protesters expressing solidarity with Wellington protesters.

In addition, a drive-through protest was organised in the South Otago town of Balclutha by Owaka Valley dairy farmer Michael Magiera to protest both the Government and Farmland Cooperative's mandatory vaccination policies. In addition, 40 people took part in an anti-lockdown protest in Dunedin's Octagon.

That same day, between 150 and 300 protesters marched in the Southland city of Invercargill from the Invercargill War Memorial to Labour List MP Liz Craig's electorate office. The protest was organised by Voices for Freedom with participants objecting to vaccine mandates and certificates and claiming that the Government was stripping citizens of their freedoms.

=== 13 November ===
The Freedoms & Rights Coalition (TFRC) staged a "Great Gridlock" campaign in several cities and regions including Auckland, Bay of Plenty, Hawke's Bay, Nelson, Wellington and Whangārei. This involved convoys of vehicles travelling through urban centres at slow speeds (20 km/h; 12 mph) with the goal of disrupting traffic. In Christchurch, a crowd marched from Cranmer Street through the city centre, demanding a removal of COVID-19 restrictions and opposing vaccine mandates. TFRC leader Brian Tamaki had earlier threatened to gridlock traffic in all major centres if the Government refused to lift all restrictions by 12 November. The TRFC issued four demands for the Government: to remove vaccination mandates immediately, revoke the traffic light system, lift the Auckland borders and move New Zealand to Alert level one. Police confirmed they were monitoring the protests. Mayor of Auckland Phil Goff has criticised protesters for disrupting traffic in Auckland and a vaccination event at Mt Smart Stadium.

In addition, 260 people marched down Dunedin's George Street to protest against the Government's vaccine mandate. 60 protesters lined the highway leading to Cromwell in the Otago region.

=== 16 November ===
Protests against the Government's vaccine mandate were held in New Plymouth and Hastings. In New Plymouth, protesters marched from Taranaki Base Hospital to the New Plymouth District Council before terminating outside the Labour Party's electorate office.

In Hastings, 100 people marched from Hawke's Bay Hospital to Tukituki Labour Member of Parliament Anna Lorck's office in the city centre. Protesters included education and health workers who had lost their jobs as a result of the Government's vaccine mandate deadline on 15 November.

=== 20 November ===
Tamaki's TFRC organised a 1,000 strong protest to mark the "National Day of Compassion" outside the Auckland War Memorial Museum in the Auckland Domain to protest the Government's vaccine mandate. This marked the fourth protest in Auckland organised by Tamaki's Coalition. In response, the Auckland War Memorial Museum closed its doors, citing health and safety concerns with large crowd gatherings. Following Tamaki's speech in the Auckland Domain, protesters marched through the Newmarket shopping strip, disrupting traffic.

In addition, similar protests were staged in New Plymouth, Wellington, Gisborne, Whangarei, Rotorua, Hawke's Bay, Nelson, Christchurch and Dunedin. In New Plymouth, hundreds marched from Puke Ariki Landing to East End Reserve. Participants also paid tribute to two teachers who had participated in an anti-lockdown protests in Wellington on 9 November. In Wellington, 250 people gathered in the Te Ngākau Civic Square. Nelson protesters held a banner stating "Freedom for all Kiwis." In Dunedin, 100 protesters gathered in The Octagon in the city centre, with some wearing Make America Great Again caps.

On 23 November, Brian and Hannah Tamaki were summoned to the Auckland Central Police station for attending the Auckland Domain protest held on 20 November. At the time of the protest, Brian was subject to bail conditions dictating that he avoid attending further protests. In response, 100 supporters gathered outside the Police station in solidarity with the Tamakis. Brian denied breaching bail conditions and criticised the Government's "traffic light system".

=== 27 November ===
Between 100 and 200 protesters gathered for an anti-lockdown and anti-vaccination rally outside the Auckland War Memorial Museum in the Auckland Domain. Unlike the previous four protests, this protest was not organised by Brian Tamaki's Freedom and Rights Coalition. According to The New Zealand Herald, the rally was connected to an online flyer advertising the "Millions March" travelling from the Auckland Domain to Mercy Hospital. Tamaki had earlier appeared in court the third time for breaching bail conditions. Auckland District Court Judge Steve Bonnar QC ordered Tamaki and his wife Hannah not to attend future protests in the Auckland Domain.

=== 3 December ===
During the first day of the traffic light system, over 300 protesters marched through Invercargill to protest vaccine mandates and advocate bodily autonomy. Some participants expressed distrust of the Pfizer COVID-19 vaccine.

=== 4 December ===
The Freedom and Rights Coalition organised a protest in Auckland known as the "Mass Exodus" that was attended by thousands. Protesters gathered outside the Auckland War Memorial Museum in the Auckland Domain before marching to Newmarket and Government House. Newmarket Business Association head Mark Knoff-Thomas criticised the protesters for disrupting business operations in Newmarket. Due to bail restrictions, Brian and Hannah Tamaki did not attend the rally but a relative was one of the speakers.

200 anti-vaccination protesters also marched in New Plymouth, gathering at Puke Ariki before marching up Devon Street. Besides placards criticising the Government's vaccine mandate, several participants also carried pro-Trump campaign banners, the tino rangatiratanga flag, and the United Tribes of New Zealand flag.

=== 10 December ===
Anti-lockdown protesters gathered in the Auckland Domain to protest against the Government's COVID-19 policies. 100 participants then marched to the Government House in nearby Epsom. According to The New Zealand Herald, the protesters consisted of several different factions including Voices For Freedom supporters, those holding United Tribes flags and those opposing the Chinese Communist Party. Several speakers spoke at the Auckland Domain gathering including Auckland businessman and mayoral candidate Leo Molloy (who urged protesters not to disrupt businesses) and Casy Hodgkinson (who had allegedly suffered an adverse vaccine reaction). Newmarket Business Association chief executive Mark Knoff-Thomas confirmed that he and Molloy had reached out to organisers to ensure that their protests did not disrupt business operations.

=== 16 December ===
Between 2,000 and 3,000 people marched from Wellington's Civil Square to the New Zealand Parliament to protest COVID-19 vaccine mandates and "traffic light" restrictions, disrupting traffic in the Wellington CBD. The protest was organised by The Freedom & Rights Coalition with Destiny Church senior pastor Derek Tait speaking during the rally. The protesters were also accompanied by 60 motorbike riders. Police and the Wellington City Council monitored the protest. While the protesters were largely peaceful and well-behaved, some participants carried signs calling for the arrest of Prime Minister Ardern and likening her to Nazi Germany and the Christchurch mosque shooter Brenton Tarrant. The New Zealand Herald also reported that one participant was selling Trump memorabilia including MAGA caps and banners.

That same day, 200 protesters gathered at outside Invercargill's Civic Administration building to protest the Invercargill City Council's decision to introduce vaccine pass requirements for certain council facilities including libraries, swimming pools, He Waka Tuia Museum, and city council chambers. In response, police and security guards were deployed to various City Council facilities.

== 2022 ==
=== 8 January ===
Destiny Church leader Brian Tamaki spoke at a rally in Christchurch's Hagley Park to protest against the Government's COVID-19 vaccine mandate and lockdown policies. Tamaki claimed that the event was a "family picnic" rather than a protest. The New Zealand Police confirmed they were investigating whether Tamaki had breached his bail conditions preventing him from organising, attending, supporting or speaking at any protest gathering in breach of COVID-19 requirements. On 17 January, Tamaki was arrested for breaching bail conditions by participating in the Christchurch anti-lockdown event.

Voices for Freedom organised an anti-COVID-19 vaccination and lockdown rally in Whanganui. One of the attendees was National Party Member of Parliament Harete Hipango, who posted a photo of herself at the rally to social media, alongside a post criticising the label 'anti-vaxer' and 'misinformer'. Following a discussion with National leader Christopher Luxon, Hipango deleted the post, with Luxon releasing a statement stating that the views of Voices for Freedom do not align with the National Party.

=== 15 January ===
The Freedoms & Rights Coalition staged a protest in Auckland's Manukau suburb at 1:30 pm. Protesters marched through several Manukau City Centre streets including Great South Road, Te Irirangi Drive, and Manukau Station Road.

=== 22 January ===
Anti-vaccine and anti-lockdown protests were held in Wellington and Auckland. In Wellington, 1,000 people marched near Te Ngākau Civic Square, disrupting traffic. In Auckland, protesters gathered in Aotea Square.

=== Brian Tamaki solidarity protests ===
Following Tamaki's arrest on 17 January 2022 and subsequent remand in custody, his supporters picketed the Mount Eden Correctional Facility, setting up tents and sounding motorbike horns. The protesters were criticised by Mount Eden residents for creating noise, rubbish, and blocking public walkways in the area around the prison. In response, Police monitored the protests and liaised with the Auckland Council, Corrections Department, and the protest organisers.

Between 200 and 300 supporters from Destiny Church and the Freedom and Rights Coalition camped outside Mount Eden prison until his release on 26 January 2022. On 22 January, six pastors including City Impact Church pastor Peter Mortlock objected to Tamaki's imprisonment, claiming that Government had silenced Tamaki for his dissenting views. On 26 January, High Court judge Paul Davison ruled that the decision to remand him in prison was wrong and ordered his release on bail. As part of his new bail conditions, Tamaki was barred from organising, participating and supporting future anti-lockdown protests and ordered to remain at home on a 24-hour curfew.

=== 28 January ===
50 anti-vaccination protesters picketed the Christchurch Holocaust Remembrance Ceremony at the Peace Bells in the Christchurch Botanic Gardens. They refused to wear masks, heckled speakers including Labour MP Sarah Pallett and intimidated several attendees, prompting Police to intervene and speak to several demonstrators. Holocaust Centre of New Zealand chairwoman Deb Hart criticised the protesters for disrupting the Holocaust remembrance service for political purposes, describing their actions as "disgusting."

=== 29 January ===
A group of anti-COVID regulations protesters marched through Dunedin's Octagon, sharing the city centre with a group of Falun Gong protesters. The Falun Gong organisers changed the programme and had a speaker discuss the issues they were protesting while the anti-lockdown group shared the area. The Falun Gong group included a marching band and had been participating in a tour of several South Island regions including Canterbury, Otago, and Southland.

=== Convoy 2022 NZ ===
On 6 February, two convoys of vehicles carrying anti-lockdown and anti-vaccine mandate protesters travelled from Cape Reinga in the North Island and Bluff in the South Island to Wellington. The Convoy 2022 protesters converged outside the New Zealand Parliament in Wellington. The South Island convoy was led by co-organiser Derek Broomhall. The convoy protest was inspired by the Canadian Freedom Convoy that converged in Ottawa on 22 January 2022 to protest the Canadian Government's vaccine mandate and COVID-19 measures. The Convoy 2022 protesters were motivated by various issues including opposition to vaccine mandates, restrictions on the unvaccinated, vaccine disinformation, COVID-19 conspiracy theories, allegations of mainstream media bias, and other domestic issues such as resentment towards Māori tribal groups for allegedly "selling out" and the planned closure of the Marsden Point Oil Refinery.

On 2 March, a riot broke out at the Parliament grounds. After police tried to break up the Convoy 2022 camp, the protesters decided to light the camp on fire. The flames spread out and destroyed several objects, including a children's playground. Demonstrators fired objects (including rocks, bricks, and paint bombs) at police officers. Riot police arrested 38 people and pulled down several tents.

=== 23 February ===
Voices for Freedom protesters picketed Prime Minister Ardern's visit to Westport. Anti-vaccine mandate Protesters hurled abuse at Ardern and journalists.

=== 24 February ===
50 anti-vaccine mandate protesters picketed Tuahiwi School in the Canterbury region during Ardern's visit, interrupting her meeting with students and staff. The protesters' actions were criticised by local Māori leaders from Te Ngāi Tūāhuriri Rūnanga.

=== March Out These Mandates ===
On 24 February, The Freedoms & Rights Coalition announced that they would be launching a "March Out These Mandates" campaign to oppose the Government's vaccine mandates. As part of the protest, the group planned to march across the Auckland Harbour Bridge on 26 February. Similar protests were also planned in Tauranga, Napier, Wellington, Nelson and Christchurch. The Coalition's leader Brian Tamaki claimed these protests were "peaceful, family-friendly" events that were intended to make a statement at significant landmarks. In response to the planned Auckland Harbour protest, Police sought to engage with organisers not to use the Harbour Bridge for their protest while advising motorists to use the alternative State Highway 16/State Highway 20 link.

Thousands of protesters gathered at Onepoto Domain on the north end of the bridge before marching on the southbound lane. The TFRC's march across the Auckland Harbour Bridge led to the closure of southbound traffic for an hour and a half. Organisers worked with Police to minimise traffic disruption while Māori Wardens escorted the protesters for safety reasons. Following the march, protesters gathered at Victoria Park. A small number of protesters camped in the Auckland Domain in violation of Auckland Council by-laws. In response, the Auckland Council closed the Domain to vehicles. On 3 March, the Auckland Domain protesters complied with a Police request to leave following the dispersal of the Wellington protest. Police and Auckland Council officials helped the protesters to remove their tents and camping equipment.

=== 12 March ===
The Freedoms & Rights Coalition staged a rally from Christchurch's Hagley Park to the Westfield Riccarton shopping centre. The rally was organised by Destiny Church Pastor Derek Tait and attended by over a thousand people including a convoy of motorbikes. Protesters blocked the shopping centre's two entrances. In response, the Christchurch City Council advised motorists to avoid Riccarton Road between 11am and 2pm.

=== 29 March ===
100 people from the group "Silent no More" marched from Wellington's Te Ngākau Civic Square to Parliament. They delivered a 12,000 strong petition to Parliament demanding recognition for New Zealanders who claimed that they had been injured by COVID-19 vaccines. The delegation was met by National Member of Parliament Chris Penk, who had been informed of the petition by a constituent. Police monitored the protest.

=== 1 April ===
Several anti-mandate protesters from a group called "Unite" staged a protest outside the New Zealand National War Memorial in Pukeahu, Wellington. Unite stated that the protest was part of a 14-day protest campaign with the primary objective of the first day being to reconnect as a group and reform the foundation torn apart by the dispersal of the 2022 Wellington protests on 2 March 2022. The Returned Services Association's National President BJ Clark objected to the Unite protesters using the National War Memorial as a gathering site.

=== 14 May ===
About 30 Anti-vaccine mandate protesters including former Advance New Zealand candidate Rick Cribb protested outside the Palmerston North Bridge Club, which was hosting a function attended by National Party leader Christopher Luxon, National MP Ian McKelvie, several National Party members and members of the local Chinese community. Protesters blocked the entrance of the Bridge Club, preventing patrons from leaving until Police arrived.

=== 2 July ===
TFRC supporters led by Destiny Church pastor Derek Tait gathered in the lower Octagon in Dunedin. Besides opposing vaccine mandates, they also protested against government control and the Three Waters reform programme. Besides Tait, other speakers at the TFRC-sponsored event included University of Otago computer scientist Iain Hewson and anti-transgender activist Jennifer Scott.

They were met by over a hundred counter-protesters supporting AntiFascist Ōtepoti, who occupied the bottom half of the Octagon. The counter-protesters were led by "queer" artist, composer, and bar co-owner Dudley Benson, who claimed that they were opposing the FRC's alleged promulgation of homophobia, misogyny and White supremacy. The counter-demonstrators played several queer songs by Lily Allen, ABBA, and Village People on a sound system in an attempt to drown out the TFRC rally. Tait denied that the TFRC was opposed to the LGBTQ+ community and reiterated his group's opposition to vaccine mandates and the Three Waters programme.

=== 23 August ===
Between 1500 and 2000 people, led by Destiny Church leader Brian Tamaki, descended on Parliament in Wellington. They put on a 'mock trial' of public figures, concluding they were all guilty of so-called crimes against humanity. Tamaki announced the formation of Freedoms New Zealand, an umbrella party of various factions, some of whom later denied involvement. The demonstration ended peacefully without any arrests.

=== Baby W blood donation controversy ===
On 30 November, a hundred anti-vaccination protesters picketed the Auckland High Court. The High Court was hearing an initial hearing where Health New Zealand sought legal guardianship of a baby boy in need of heart surgery after the boy's parents refused to allow blood from COVID-19 vaccinated people to be used in the operation. The New Zealand Blood Service, the national supplier of blood products, does not separate blood from vaccinated and unvaccinated donors. Health NZ was represented by Paul White while the boy's parents were represented by anti-vaccination activist and lawyer Sue Grey. In addition, the parents were supported by former TVNZ broadcaster and anti-vaccination activist Liz Gunn.

On 7 December, Gault J of the Auckland High Court ruled in favour of Health New Zealand, making Baby W a guardian of the court and appointing two doctors as agents of the Court to provide consent for the surgery. In response to the Court ruling, anti-vaccination protesters picketed the Auckland High Court, Starship Hospital, and Auckland City Hospital. After the parents obstructed medical personnel preparing Baby W for the operation, Gault issued an emergency order allowing Police to use "reasonable force" to remove Baby W from his parents' custody. On 9 December, Grey confirmed that Baby W had undergone a successful heart surgery operation and was recovering well. On 10 December, Grey and the parents confirmed that they would continue challenging the Court's decision through the legal system.

== Proponents ==
Key groups and individuals involved in anti-lockdown protests and related activism have included FACTS NZ, the Kotahitanga Movement Aotearoa, the Liberty March Movement, Advance New Zealand party co-leader Jami-Lee Ross, New Zealand Public Party leader Billy Te Kahika, Destiny Church leader Brian Tamaki's "The Freedoms & Rights Coalition" (TFRC), Voices for Freedom, and New Zealand Outdoors Party leader Sue Grey. Besides opposition to COVID-19 lockdown and vaccination policies, these figures and groups have also expressed opposition to 5G technology, 1080 usage, the United Nations, water fluoridation, Communist China, and the Government's Three Waters reform programme.

In early November 2021, the University of Auckland's Te Pūnaha Matatini's The Disinformation Project released a working paper examining COVID-19 misinformation and disinformation since the Delta outbreak began on 17 August 2021. The paper found that far right online communities in New Zealand and abroad were using various social media platforms particularly Telegram to spread disinformation about COVID-19 vaccines and lockdown policies through the use of memes, emotional testimonies, and Māori motifs and symbols. The paper also observed that anti-lockdown and anti-vaccine elements were reappropriating Māori motifs and symbols such as the hīkoi and United Tribes of New Zealand flag to encourage Māori vaccine hesitancy and exploit ethnic tensions. The paper argued that far right elements were using COVID-19 and vaccination as a Trojan horse for promoting far right ideologies in New Zealand on a range of issues including gun control, anti-Māori sentiment, homophobia, transphobia, conservative family values and structures, misogyny, and immigration.

=== Voices for Freedom ===
Voices for Freedom was founded in December 2020 by food blogger and Advance New Zealand candidate Claire Deeks, Libby Johnson and Alia Bland as "a non-political organisation focused on protecting New Zealanders' fundamental human rights with a particular focus on freedom of speech, health/medical freedom and all freedoms under attack from an overzealous and oppressive Covid-19 response."

=== The Freedoms & Rights Coalition ===
The Freedoms & Rights Coalition (TFRC) is a self-described "people's movement" founded by Brian Tamaki to oppose the Government's COVID-19 lockdown restrictions and vaccination mandate. In early November 2021, a Stuff report identified Jenny Marshall, Destiny Church's director of operations and Tamaki's assistant, as the owner of TFRC's web domain. TFRC has used its website to solicit donations and sells merchandise including t-shirts, flags and facemasks emblazoned with anti-lockdown messaging. Marshall acknowledged that Tamaki was the "founder" and "architect" of the TFRC but claimed that the Coalition's merchandising and donations were separate from the Church's finances. The group has organised protests across the country against the Government's COVID-19 mitigation policies, vaccine mandate, and governance.
