= Freedoms New Zealand =

Former political group in New Zealand

- Co-leaders: Brian Tamaki; Sue Grey
- Founder: Brian Tamaki
- Founded: 22 February 2022
- Think tank: The Freedoms & Rights Coalition
- Ideology: Anti-vaccine sentiment Anti-lockdown politics Right-wing populism
- Political position: Right-wing
- Members: NZ Outdoors & Freedom Party; Vision NZ; Rock the Vote NZ; Yes Aotearoa
- Former members: New Nation Party
- Colours: Purple; Turquoise; Dark blue
- MPs in the House of Representatives: 0 / 120

Website
- freedomsnz.org.nz

Freedoms New Zealand, also known as Freedoms NZ: Uniting Political Parties and Freedom Movements, was a political "umbrella party" in New Zealand, founded on 22 August 2022 by Brian Tamaki following a series of protests. In the 2023 general election it was co-led by Tamaki and Sue Grey. It consisted of Tamaki's Freedom and Rights Coalition organisation, the registered Vision NZ and Outdoors & Freedom parties, and the unregistered Yes Aotearoa and Rock The Vote NZ parties.

In the 2023 New Zealand general election, Freedoms New Zealand received 0.33% of the party vote and did not win any electorate seats, so did not enter parliament.

The party was deregistered in May 2025.

== Formation and membership ==
Freedoms NZ was founded by Brian Tamaki, and is the third political party he has been connected to. Destiny New Zealand, a party associated with Tamaki's Destiny Church, existed from 2003 to 2007 and did not succeed in any elections. Vision NZ launched in 2019, and received 0.1% of the party vote at the 2020 election.

Tamaki announced the creation of Freedoms NZ on 22 August 2022 during the "People's court" protest in Wellington. He described it as an "umbrella of hope". The party's goals according to Tamaki would be to address the cost of living crisis, health, gang crime, as well as the shared goal of seeing "the political establishment cleaned out".

=== Original members ===
At its formation, Tamaki announced that the party consisted of the Vision NZ Party, the New Nation Party, and the NZ Outdoors & Freedom Party. However, the latter responded that Tamaki had "jumped the gun" and that they "requested time to discuss the issues together". Outdoors and Freedom Party president Alan Simmonds later expressed his concerns of being "labelled a totally freedom nutter party".

A number of other politicians and parties declined to join, despite being specifically encouraged to consider it by Tamaki in his announcement speech. These included New Conservative Party, New Zealand First, and newly independent MP Gaurav Sharma. Similarly, when The Freedoms & Rights Coalition issued a statement expressing interest for the participation of several additional parties, none of them joined. These included Matt King's DemocracyNZ, Heartland New Zealand Party, ONE Party, Social Credit Party, Sustainable New Zealand Party, The Opportunities Party, and the New Zealand TEA Party.

The party applied for registration on 28 November. Registration was approved on 16 February 2023.

=== 2023 expansion and co-leadership ===
The Outdoors & Freedom Party changed its earlier position and joined Freedoms NZ in May 2023, at the same time as unregistered parties Yes Aotearoa and Rock the Vote New Zealand. Outdoors & Freedom co-leader Sue Grey was announced as the co-leader of Freedoms NZ alongside Tamaki. Grey said Freedoms NZ was open to incorporating the Leighton Baker Party and DemocracyNZ, though Leighton Baker ruled his party out.

On 31 May, Freedoms NZ, the Outdoors & Freedom Party, and Vision NZ sought a joint judicial review of the Electoral Commission's decision to allocate broadcasting funds to them collectively rather than as individual political parties. The Electoral Commission had decided to allocate broadcasting funds to them collectively on the basis that they were a "group of parties" that had joined forces.

Outdoors & Freedom held back on registering itself as an official "component party" of Freedoms NZ while the plaintiffs argued in court that the Broadcasting Act 1989 did not clearly define a "group of parties" and that the Electoral Commission had no clear way of deciding when a group met the (undeclared) criteria. The New Zealand High Court dismissed the plaintiffs' claims. Outdoors & Freedom registered as a component party shortly afterwards.

By September 2023, the New Nation Party – a founding member – had left.

== Reactions ==
New Zealand's four largest parties all ruled out working with Freedom NZ. David Seymour, the leader of ACT New Zealand, said, "I don't think that you could have a serious conversation with people who hold a show trial for crimes against humanity". The Green Party's Marama Davidson stated that "it is far too dangerous to be able to even consider working" with the party considering their "violent agenda" and "exploitation of people".

The National Party did not formally rule out working with the party when first asked. Its leader Christopher Luxon instead said he doubted the party would enter parliament and told reporters to "read between the lines", stating that National had little in common with the party. Grant Robertson of the Labour Party criticised Luxon for failing to give a clear statement on National's position on the party. Some days later, National formally ruled out working with Freedoms NZ.

== 2023 general election ==
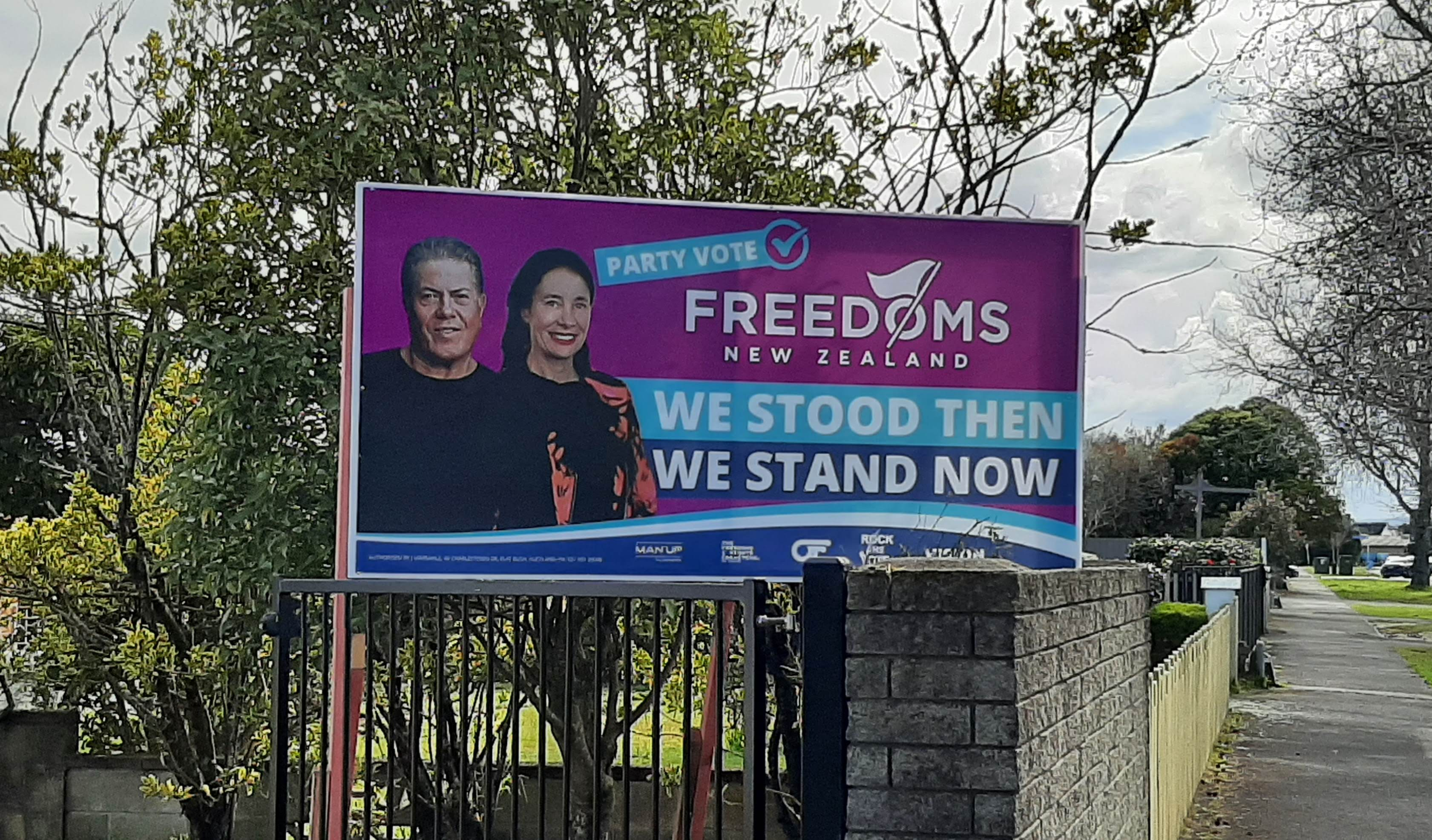
A Freedoms New Zealand party campaign sign from the 2023 election

Brian Tamaki stated in May 2023 that he believed the party could get 20% of the vote in that year's general election. As of September 2023, 1News Verian polls indicated that total support for Freedoms NZ and its component parties to sat between 0% and 0.8%. On 10 August, a Taxpayers' Union-Curia poll listed Vision NZ on 1.1% and Outdoors and Freedom on 0.5%, for a total vote share of 1.6%.

While Freedoms New Zealand campaigned for the party vote, component parties ran their own electorate candidates. These included Sue Grey standing for Outdoors & Freedom in West Coast-Tasman, and Vision NZ's Karl Mokaraka in Panmure-Ōtāhuhu.

=== Disruptions of other parties' events ===
In August, Mokaraka and a group of supporters chased Labour leader Chris Hipkins with horns and loudspeakers to spoil a campaign visit to the Ōtara Markets. Eight days later, Mokaraka disrupted a press conference by climbing a fence to heckle National leader Christopher Luxon and transport spokesman Simeon Brown in Pakuranga. The press conference was abandoned. Hipkins said that "Brian Tamaki and his mob are very determined to disrupt the election campaign...Ultimately, that's anti-democratic...I don’t think a party that thought it had any shot at getting into parliament would be doing that." Tamaki described Mokaraka's actions as "brilliant" and suggested that a vision from God had shown him more such disruption during the coming campaign.

On 2 September, Chris Hipkins' speech at the Labour Party's official campaign launch in Auckland was interrupted three times by Freedoms NZ protestors. They were removed by security and at least one was arrested. Another group of Freedoms NZ protesters appeared outside a New Zealand First rally in Nelson a week later, prompting leader Winston Peters to say, "About eight months ago they wanted me to join them".

Karl Mokaraka disguised himself to enter the ACT Party campaign launch a fortnight later. During leader David Seymour's speech, Mokaraka stood on his third-row seat to interrupt the event. He called himself "the man on the fence" – a reference to the National Party press conference he'd spoiled a few weeks earlier – and yelled for several minutes. Later, two other hecklers were removed, one of whom cried out, "Party vote Freedoms".

=== 28 September protest ===
On September 28 the Freedoms & Rights Coalition brought thousands of protesters to Parliament again. The crowd was led by Brian Tamaki, who called for a "ballot box revolution", and also addressed by both Hannah Tamaki and Sue Grey. The protest was reported to have "fizzled out" after about two hours.

=== Results ===
In the 2023 New Zealand general election, Freedoms New Zealand received 0.33% of the party vote (9,586 votes) and did not win any electorate seats, meaning it did not enter parliament. Brian Tamaki did not contest an electorate, Sue Grey came seventh of nine in West Coast-Tasman, Hannah Tamaki came last of five in Tāmaki Makaurau, and Donna Pokere-Phillips came last of three in Hauraki-Waikato.

== Deregistration ==
In May 2025, Freedoms NZ was deregistered as a political party. This happened at the party's own request. On LinkedIn, Brian Tamaki recorded his time as Freedoms NZ president and co-leader as ending in April 2025.

Hannah Tamaki contested September's 2025 Tāmaki Makaurau by-election under the banner of Vision NZ. She gained 175 votes out of 10,688.

== List of leaders ==
=== Freedoms New Zealand ===
No.	Name	Term of office		No.	Name	Term of office	
1	Brian Tamaki	c. August 2022	April 2025	1	Sue Grey	c. May 2023	c. May 2025

=== Component parties ===
==== Rock the Vote NZ ====
===== Leader =====
No.	Name	Term of office	
1	Michael Avenell	c. 2022	c. 26 April 2024
2	John Alcock	26 April 2024	2025
3	Andrew Crowley	21 June 2025	27 June 2026

===== Deputy leader =====
No.	Name	Term of office		Leader
1	Daymond Goulder-Horobin	21 June 2025	27 June 2026	Crowley
