= Destiny Church (New Zealand) =

Religious movement in New Zealand

Coordinates: 37.0010278°S 174.8769320°E

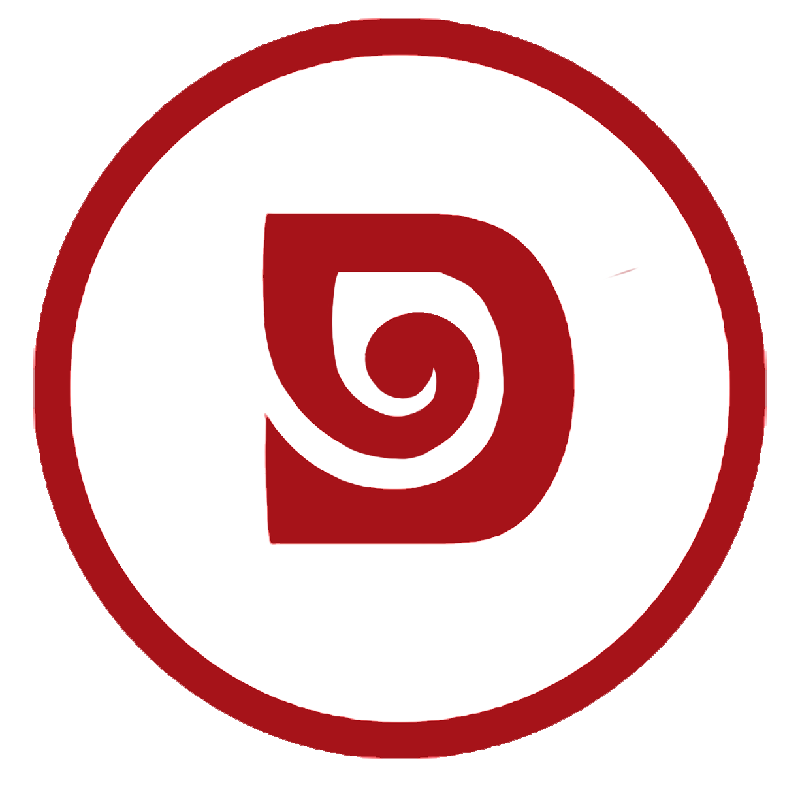
- Classification: Pentecostalism; New religious movement (disputed)
- Theology: Prosperity theology
- Region: New Zealand – North Island: Auckland Region, Waikato, East Cape, Bay of Plenty, Wellington – South Island: Christchurch, Nelson; Australia: Gold Coast
- Language: English, Māori
- Headquarters: Wiri, Auckland, New Zealand
- Founder: Brian Tamaki, Hannah Tamaki
- Origin: July 1998; 28 years ago South Auckland
- Members: 1,772 (2018 New Zealand census); 6,000 (claimed)
- Primary schools: 1, Destiny School (composite school; year 1–15)
- Secondary schools: 1, Destiny School (composite school; year 1–15)

Destiny Church is a New Zealand Christian organisation variously described as a church or a new religious movement. Based in South Auckland and with a strong Māori conservative character, Destiny Church's direction and ideology is highly personalised around its leader and founder, Brian Tamaki, whose title is "Apostle Bishop", and his wife Hannah Tamaki. The couple founded Destiny Church in 1998, and quick growth led to it peaking in 2003 with approximately 5,000 members. As of the 2018 New Zealand Census, the organisation has a recorded 1,772 followers, under a third of the 6,000 claimed by Tamaki.

Destiny Church describes itself as an "iwi-tapu" or a "spiritual tribe of God's people". Its structure is Pentecostal, with Tamaki preaching the prosperity gospel to his followers, who are overwhelmingly Māori and Pasifika. The group advocates strict adherence to Biblical morality, and has a reputation for its strong position against homosexuality, for its patriarchal views and for its calls for a return to Biblical conservative family values and morals.

In the 2000s, Destiny Church expanded outside of Auckland; this was mostly across the Upper North Island, but there is also a branch in Wellington, two in the South Island, and one in Australia on the Gold Coast in Queensland, which has a very significant Māori population. Rising to prominence in the 2000s, Destiny Church sponsored a nationwide rally against civil unions, attempted to build a commune, and issued a DVD which labelled the Government of New Zealand as "evil".

During the COVID-19 pandemic, Tamaki incorporated anti-vaccination conspiracy theories into the group's ideology, including the denial of the virus' existence altogether. Tamaki soon became extremely opposed to lockdowns and mask mandates in New Zealand, and the group partook in the 2022 Wellington anti-vaccine protest. Various small political parties split from the group to contest the 2020 and 2023 New Zealand general elections, including Freedoms New Zealand, Vision NZ, and the New Nation Party, none of which gained more than 0.5% of the party vote.

Since the beginning of the Gaza war, the group has strongly backed Israel and performed haka to show support for the Israel Defence Forces. Tamaki's actions and rhetoric have attracted criticism from the New Zealand media and from other public figures. He has been criticised for blaming the 2011 Christchurch earthquake on the "sexual perversion" of gay people, and for holding a gathering of 700 men who swore a "covenant" oath of allegiance, obedience, and deference to him. Tamaki has run afoul of the law, having been imprisoned for breaching bail conditions as he took part in an anti-vaccination protest in Christchurch.

== Organisation ==
=== Leadership ===
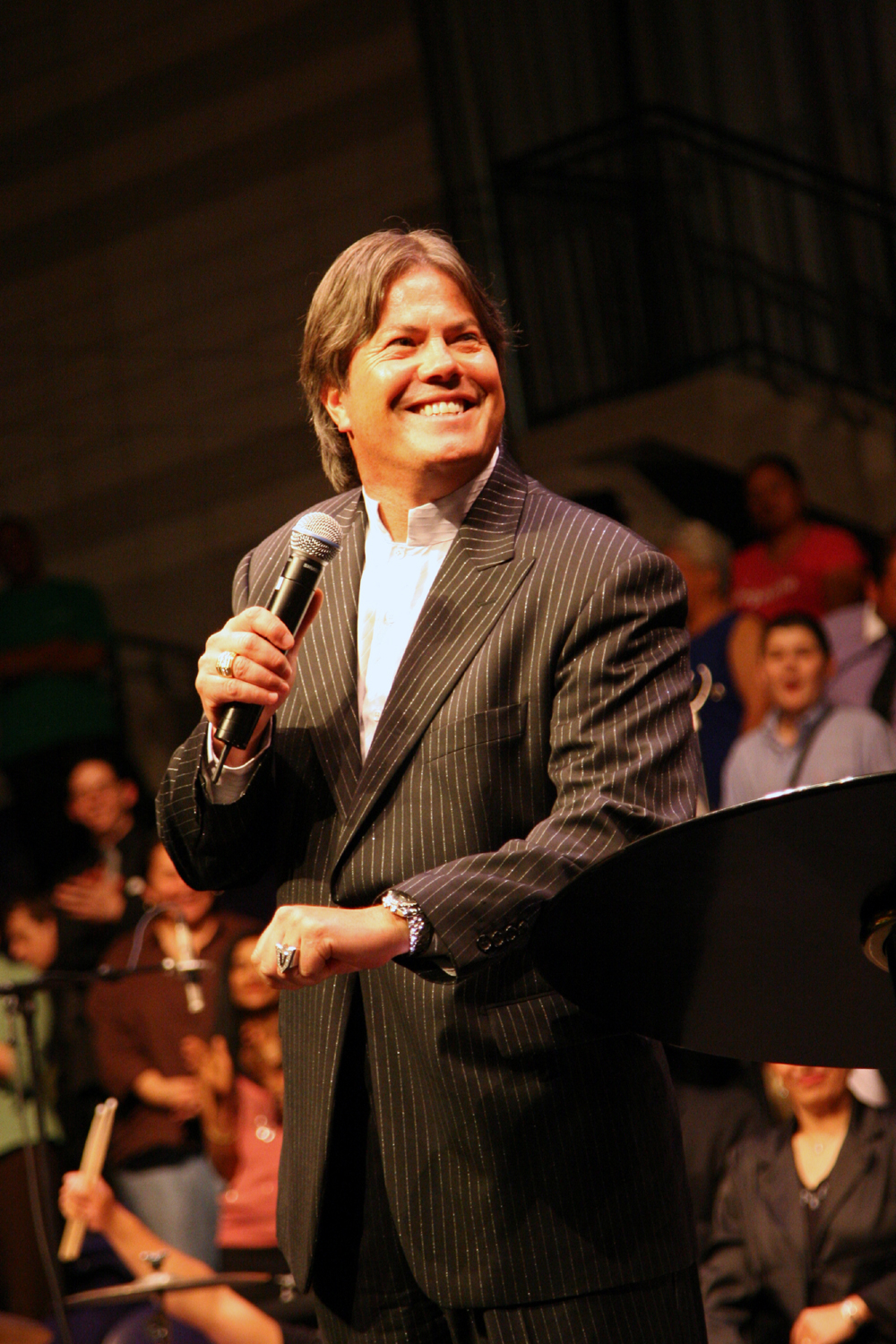
Brian Tamaki at a church conference in Auckland (22 October 2006)

Described by religious expert Peter Lineham as "Māori-focused", Destiny Church is led by Brian Tamaki and his wife Hannah Tamaki, who hold the positions of Visionary and Senior Ministers. The Tamakis established the organisation together in 1998 as a splinter from their previous investment, Lake City Church in Rotorua. Their three adult children Jasmine, Jamie, and Samuel are all actively involved in the church ministry. Samuel and his wife pastor the Destiny church on the Gold Coast in Australia, Jamie and her husband are the CEO of ManUp and Legacy International, Jasmine and her husband facilitate social services within the ManUp and Legacy organisation. Brian and Hannah have 5 generations of their family in Destiny Church. Following a unanimous agreement by the then 19 other pastors of Destiny Churches throughout New Zealand, Tamaki was ordained as a bishop during a ceremony performed by kaumātua and Destiny Pastor, Manuel Renata, on 18 June 2005. The church's leadership encourage obedience to its teachings and its rhetoric has sometimes alienated other churches that have different approaches to Christianity. In 2003, Tamaki, in what he described as a prophetic utterance, predicted that Destiny would be "ruling the nation" within five years.

=== Ministry ===
The church claims to provide not only biblical guidance and teaching but also a range of social services including budget advice, family and parenting advice, support for drug and alcohol abusers, anger management and resolution, provision of food and housing. Church services are energetic and have a Pentecostal worship style. The preaching and teaching is strongly conservative, literalist interpretation of Biblical teachings. Its membership is predominantly Māori and Polynesian, intergenerational, and from all levels of the socio-economic sections of New Zealand society. Religious expert Peter Lineham has said of the church's followers: "they stem from the endemic Māori struggle to find a secure space in Western capitalist society, although there are obviously huge differences between the rural Māori that Rātana reached out to and the urban Māori community that has flocked to Tamaki. The development of a socially and politically active Christianity was a logical response in both cases."

=== Locations and membership ===
Destiny Church is located in South Auckland, New Zealand. The current site is in Wiri, and houses the church auditorium and its administration offices, a chapel, a multipurpose room, a fitness/boxing gym, a medical centre, an early childhood centre and school. The church began in Rotorua as "Lake City Church", which had a membership of 20 people. Within two years, it had grown to 300 members. Over the years, Destiny churches were established in the following locations:

Auckland - July 1998	Whakatane - March 2001	Tauranga - April 2001	Nelson - June 2001
Hamilton - June 2002	Christchurch - April 2003	Whangārei - June 2003	Wellington - August 2003
Wanganui - May 2004	Taranaki	Rotorua	Brisbane

At its peak in 2003, Destiny Church had a network of 19 church branches throughout New Zealand, with a total membership in excess of 5,000. By June 2012 it had 11 remaining branches, with around 3000 regular attendees. In 2019, Brian Tamaki claimed the church had in excess of 6,000 members. However, in the 2018 census, just 1,772 gave their religion as "Destiny Church", less than did for the satirical Church of the Flying Spaghetti Monster (4248) and Jediism (20,409), and only slightly more than Zoroastrianism. In the aftermath, NZME described Destiny Church's membership as "surprisingly low", while The Spinoff went further, describing Destiny Church as "utterly marginal". Church branches have closed in Porirua (the second in Wellington, after Petone), Wanganui and Dunedin. By June 2013, Destiny Church Wanganui was no longer listed on the main church website. In addition, other branches such as Kaitaia, Ōpōtiki, Taumarunui, and Hawkes Bay had either closed down or merged with other church branches. Destiny Church has also expanded to Australia, with one branch formerly in Brisbane and a current one on the Gold Coast. The Gold Coast has a very significant Māori population.

=== Broadcasting ===
Destiny TV, a televangelist ministry, launched in 2001 and produced 30-minute programmes that ran every weekday morning on New Zealand's national television broadcaster. The programmes were funded by donations from Destiny Church members. TVNZ ceased to broadcast the programme in late 2004 just after the formation of the Destiny New Zealand political party. as of 2018, Destiny TV still operates as the video production arm of Destiny Church. Weekly Destiny TV programmes are available for streaming on Destiny Church's website.

=== Destiny School ===
The church also operates a composite school (catering for both primary and secondary students), known as Destiny School, which uses the Cambridge education system alongside the New Zealand curriculum.

== History ==
=== Origins ===
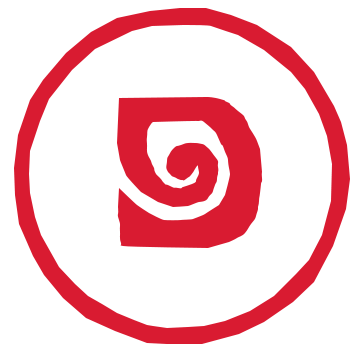
old logo

The Destiny Church movement was founded in 1998 from 20 members of Lake City Church in Rotorua, initially calling itself City Church Auckland. Destiny Church was founded by Brian Tamaki and his wife Hannah Tamaki, who continue to serve as Visionary and Senior Ministers of Destiny Church. Destiny Church had a close relationship with New Birth Missionary Baptist Church in Atlanta, USA, the church of Bishop Eddie Long. In his autobiography Tamaki described meeting Long, "my spiritual father", in 2002. Historian Peter Lineham has compared Destiny Church's liturgy progression away from orthodox Christianity to the late 1920s Ratana movement's divergence and eventual excommunication. Lineham also notes the usages of the historic and strong belief within Christianity in Māoridom to promote his reach and teachings.

Destiny is in some ways very different from other Pentecostal churches. The latest Destiny stories have focused on its growing links with Ratana, its presence at Waitangi, its Legacy march down Queen Street and the title of bishop which its founder and leader, Brian Tamaki has taken ...
We must recall that it is Māori at heart, although not tribal Māori. It trains people in Kapa haka (and performed them all too vehemently at Waitangi); it captures the hearts of many Māori women, perhaps appealing particularly to detribalised Māori. And it has a political agenda which places treaty issues high on the agenda ...
Let there be no doubt, there are some deep tensions running through New Zealand society, troubles underneath the optimism, and fundamentally they are cultural differences. Culture and religion walk hand in hand. The issues facing us today involve a deep debate over values. We should never be confident that we know which side will win.

— Peter Lineham, Among the believers

=== Enough is Enough rally ===
Destiny Church has campaigned for a return to what it considers to be "Christian moral values" in New Zealand society, particularly for the "sanctity of marriage between a husband and wife". In August 2004, Destiny members marched on Parliament under their "Enough is Enough" rally which drew 5000 protesters against civil unions legislation. The rally attracted considerable criticism. The black T-shirts and track-pants worn by many of the marchers prompted negative comparisons with Nazi storm-troopers in the New Zealand media. When the rally was in progress, Tamaki indicated that he did not want to be a politician, saying, "I have a higher calling than a politician, I am a man of God." A second march occurred in Auckland along with the Christian Life Centre and the City Impact Churches on 5 March 2005.

=== Plans for a "Destiny City" ===
On 29 October 2008 it was reported that Destiny Church was planning on building a holy city in South Auckland. The report was based on comments made by Brian Tamaki at the church's 10th birthday celebration, and released on DVD, where he talks about a 10-acre (40,000 m^{2}) site the church had procured, with a budget of $2.4m. He said the community would have its own maraes and medical facilities and that "every child of every member of this church will never go to a state school again". The church subsequently denied the report, a spokesperson saying they only intended to build a new headquarters and supply "social help" programmes, despite Rotorua's Daily Post quoting Tamaki as saying Destiny planned to create a "city within a city" in 2006. At the Church's 2012 annual conference in Rotorua, Tamaki presented plans including a library, bookshop, early childhood centre, three schools and a university and encouraged tithing, saying "I don't care what the media say, I don't care what your relatives say, I don't care what the world says, nobody should be not tithing." In December 2012, Destiny Church moved its headquarters to a 3 ha (7.4 acres) section in Wiri, South Auckland.

=== Momentum conference and pledge of allegiance ===
In October 2009, about 700 male members of the church attended a conference called "MoMENtum" in which Tamaki likened himself to King David. Attendees swore a "covenant oath" of loyalty and obedience to Tamaki and were given a "covenant ring" to wear on their right hands. A document entitled Protocols & Requirements Between Spiritual Father & His Spiritual Sons contains the oath:

Above all, we stand here today in the presence of God to enter into this sacred covenant with our man of God, Bishop Brian Tamaki ... To you Bishop we pledge our allegiance, our faithfulness and loyalty. We pledge to serve the cause that is in your heart and to finish that work. Success to you and success to those who help you – for God is with you.

The document asserts Tamaki's authority as "Bishop" and "spiritual father" of the church he founded. Another section, "Conduct Towards Bishop", states that "Bishop is the tangible expression of God", instructs the "sons" to follow numerous protocols, to defer to Tamaki with unquestioning loyalty and obedience, to follow his dress code, and to never tolerate criticism.

== Public profile ==
=== Political activities ===
Richard Lewis, a member of Destiny Church Auckland, formed the Destiny New Zealand political party in 2003. The party first ran candidates in 2005. Candidates from four different churches joined with candidates who came from Destiny Church. Despite Tamaki's prediction that the church would rule New Zealand by 2008, the party's 42 candidates gained only 0.6 percent of the vote. This fell well short of the five percent threshold required to enter Parliament without an electorate MP but proved the best performance of any party that failed to enter Parliament. In 2007, City Impact Church and Destiny Church collaborated in the establishment of the "Family Party", but the latter won just 0.35% of the party vote in New Zealand's 2008 general election and dissolved in 2010. Since the outbreak of the Gaza war on 7 October 2023, Destiny Church has expressed support for Israel and opposition to Hamas and Palestinian solidarity protesters. In November 2023, Tamaki organised pro-Israel counter-protests in Brisbane including an "Anzacs" rally where 200 Destiny supporters performed a haka and controversial Jewish activist Avi Yemini gave a speech. In December 2023 and March 2024, Destiny Church staged pro-Israel counter-protests in Wellington.

=== Māori community ===
Destiny Church recognises and celebrates Māori as tangata whenua ("People of the Land"). It also regards itself as an "iwi-tapu" or a spiritual tribe of God's people set aside as a chosen people and a holy nation, citing a scriptural premise from 1 Peter 2:9. In 2008, Destiny Church sought to claim urban Māori status so that they could serve Māori congregants who were disconnected from their tribes. Māori broadcaster and urban Māori advocate Willie Jackson supported Destiny's proposal by arguing that Tamaki and Destiny Church had changed the lives of thousands of former Māori criminals, fraudsters, and drug dealers for the better. Destiny's socially conservative position on gay rights and women drew opposition from various sectors including Prime Minister Helen Clark. In October 2008, Destiny Church was awarded Urban Māori Authority status and Te Rūnanga a Iwi o Te Oranga Ake was incorporated to serve as the church's service provider arm. In 2011, Destiny Church received funding from the Ministry of Social Development for four Community Max programmes to help 79 youths in Auckland, Waikato, and the Bay of Plenty transition into full-time employment. However, Destiny Church struggled to receive government funding for other projects including a charter school. As a result, the Church has had to fund its own community services programme including the "Man Up" programme to help men become better fathers, husbands, and leaders in their own families and communities.

=== ManUp and legacy ===
Caine and Jamie Warren, elders of Destiny Church, founded "Man Up" in 2015. It offers a programme developed by Bishop Brian and Pastor Hannah Tamaki. The programme claims success in reducing the over-representation of Maori men in every negative statistic in New Zealand and in restoring the mana of men who have lost their sense of identity and purpose. Anecdotal evidence tells of changed individuals. ManUp Director Caine Warren told TVNZ that all men are welcome. ManUp involves everyday men from all walks of life meeting in small groups once a week throughout a 15-week time-commitment. Alongside ManUp, Destiny Church offers similar groups and programmes developed to support, empower and encourage woman (Legacy) and youth (Boys2Men, Legacy Diamonds). In February 2019 Tamaki met with Minister of Justice Andrew Little to discuss giving Destiny Church's Man Up programme permission to participate in prison rehabilitation. Tamaki has also sought access to government grants for rehabilitation programs and access to prisoners. In a media interview, Little stated that he did not anticipate Man Up indoctrinating more followers into the church, just as (for example) the Salvation Army and the Presbyterian Church do not. Tamaki clashed with the New Zealand Government in April 2019 over introducing Man Up into prisons, threatening "inmate revolts in every prison" and suggesting that ministers had subjected him to "a political gang rape". Corrections Minister Kelvin Davis stated that no "independent reputable evidence" endorsed the Man Up programme and that Tamaki had not applied and gone "through a process to get a programme into prisons".

=== Media coverage ===
In late April 2025, Destiny Church and its leader Brian Tamaki were the subject of a five-part TVNZ mini-series called Under His Command hosted by broadcaster John Campbell. The series interviewed 22 former and current Destiny Church members, who alleged that the church's Man-Up programme condoned violence and misogyny. The documentary also alleged that Tamaki utilised rage against the gay, transgender communities and immigrants as a marketing tool. Following reports that a Destiny whistleblower's face was too visible during a 1News 6pm news bulletin covering the documentary series, TVNZ removed the Destiny story from its website, citing an "abundance of caution."

== Controversies ==
=== Opposition to homosexuality ===
Destiny Church and its leader Brian Tamaki have been known for their vocal opposition to homosexuality. On 23 August 2004, Destiny Church organised a large public rally known as the "Enough is Enough" march in Wellington to oppose the Fifth Labour Government's proposed Civil Union Act. For the march, Destiny Church members wore black shirts emblazoned with the slogan "Enough is Enough." The march generated considerable media and public attention with critics such as Labour MPs Georgina Beyer and David Benson-Pope likening the marchers to Nazis. Bishop Tamaki attracted controversy when he blamed the 2010 and 2011 Christchurch earthquakes on sinful behaviour such as murder and homosexuality during a sermon on 13 November 2016. These statements preceded the 2016 Kaikōura earthquake by a few hours. Tamaki's remarks were condemned by several leading New Zealand public figures including the Mayor of Christchurch Bob Parker, Prime Minister John Key, and the Anglican bishop of Dunedin, Kelvin Wright. One Auckland-based critic Aaron Smithson also organised a Change.org petition calling for the revocation of Destiny Church's tax-free status. On Saturday 1 June 2019, Bishop Brian Tamaki formally apologised to all homosexual people for his conduct in the past. The event where this apology took place was at the Stand conference in Destiny Church Auckland. He invited his good friend Jevan Goulter who spoke on the matters as well as influential homosexual figures. Brian stated that all homosexuals, bisexuals and transgender people were welcome to his church.

=== Political and religious views ===
On his website "New Zealand: A Nation Under Siege" (bishoptamaki.org.nz) Tamaki declared the government of New Zealand to be "inherently evil", pointing out that some members of Parliament chose not to swear on the Bible, and one (Ashraf Choudhary) swore on the Qur'an, when being sworn into government. In a June 2005 interview, Tamaki said Destiny was ready to wage war on "secular humanism, liberalism, relativism, pluralism", on "a Government gone evil", on the "modern-day witchcraft" of the media, and on the "radical homosexual agenda".

On 21 June 2025, Tamaki led a Destiny Church march in Auckland's Aotea Square called "Faith, Flag and Family," which opposed non-Christian religions and mass immigration in New Zealand. Tamaki and his supporters denounced the Muslim, Buddhist, Sikh and Palestinian communities, burning flags representing those communities. Pro-Palestinian counter-demonstrators also gathered in Aotea Square, with Police separating the two groups. Two Destiny supporters also intimidated a journalist from The New Zealand Herald.

=== Tithing ===
Tithing is common practice in Destiny Church. Media articles using former Destiny Church members as sources have alleged that Tamaki has an outspoken autocratic style and highlighted the church's frequent appeals for tithe contributions, and its insular culture. The Sunday Star Times highlighted Tamaki's visible wealth and personal luxury, questioning its consistency with the church's tithing system. Church pastors agree to a restraint of trade that applies in the event that they withdraw as pastors. In March 2010, the church's Brisbane pastor resigned over a difference in doctrine. Twenty five members of the congregation followed him out of the church; some expressed their support for him to the media, saying that the church was a money-making cult. On 29 August 2017, Destiny Church co-founder and senior pastor Hannah Tamaki attracted media attention for purchasing a new Mercedes-Benz AMG GLE63 S SUV worth NZ$207,900. This coincided with reports that the Charities Services was considering stripping three of Destiny Church's charities of their charitable status for failing to file returns. Some critics have regarded these expenses as extravagant luxuries that come at the expense of church members.

=== Cult allegations ===
Following members taking a voluntary covenant pledge to Bishop Brian and the cause of Destiny Church, the church was labelled as a cult by several New Zealand media outlets and other observers. In an interview with TVNZ,

In the same interview following the reports of October 2009, Bishop Tamaki and Richard Lewis defended the pledge on the basis that it was taken willingly, and simply attempted to set standards and codify established practice within the church. Lewis denied the "cult" claims, noting that church services are open to the public. Tamaki denied the existence of a "cult of personality", saying that he was simply setting a visible example for men to follow; and that the church helps a lot of people from difficult backgrounds. Campbell Live, a current affairs program, made use of a covert camera and an unidentified witness to critique church practices and the Momentum conference. The church later issued a response, stating that "a number of comments made by the individual were grossly inaccurate", that the source was not credible, and the report reflected "poor practice". In a separate report

Whilst referring to Destiny Church as authoritarian Peter Lineham rejected the label of 'cult' and instead compared Destiny Church to the Catholic Church in its isolationism.

=== Sexual abuse allegations ===
In late March 2010, controversy arose over allegations against two adult children of Destiny Church Taranaki Pastors Robyn and Lee Edmonds. Charges were withdrawn by Police as there was no evidence. The pastors resigned from Destiny Church Taranaki leadership. Fourteen years later in May 2024, The New Zealand Herald reported that a former Destiny Church youth group leader was the subject of a sexual abuse allegation involving a male teenager in November 2023. After the teenager's mother alerted the Police, Destiny Church suspended the youth leader from his volunteer leadership role and banned him from the church. Destiny Church also removed several teenagers who were living with the man. The teenager's family had joined Destiny Church in 2018 and subsequently joined the youth group. The boy's mother alleged that her son suffered post-traumatic stress disorder following the abuse, manifesting in violent, volatile and suicidal behaviour. The mother also said that Destiny Church had held meetings with her son and the man's other alleged abuse victims, without contacting the parents or seeking their permission. She also criticised Police and Destiny Church for their alleged inaction in investigating the former youth leader's alleged sexual abuses. The Herald also reported that the former youth leader was now involved with a new South Auckland church group.

In response, Tamaki expressed sympathy for the alleged victims and their families, and said that he "hopes police investigate the matter quickly." Tamaki also criticised the Herald on Sunday for exposing the story, describing the report as "another hit-piece & gutter reporting." Police confirmed that they were investigating historical sex abuse allegations involving a Counties Manukau youth group and said there were multiple alleged victims with the alleged offending spanning several years. In early June 2024, Police had arrested and charged a 29-year-old man with six charges of indecent assault against two individuals. Police confirmed that the man was a former Destiny Church disciple involved with a South Auckland youth group. By late August 2024, Police confirmed that the suspect was facing a total of 17 charges of indecent assault and one charge of unlawful sexual connection involving five individuals connected to the South Auckland youth group. Detective Inspector Natalie Nelson said that the historical sexual allegations dated back to at least 2020. Destiny Church issued a statement that the matter was now in the hands of the Police and the courts.

On 17 March 2025, the suspect was identified as Kiwa Hamiora-Te Hira. He pleaded guilty to committing eight sexual offences and was sentenced to six years and four months imprisonment at the Manukau District Court.

=== Revocation of tax-exempt status ===
Allegedly more than 100,000 people had signed a petition calling for the New Zealand Government to revoke Destiny Church's tax-free status, reports say that this petition was in response to Tamaki's remarks blaming gays for the 2010 and 2011 Christchurch earthquakes, and church co-founder Hannah Tamaki's purchase of a brand new Mercedes-Benz in mid-August 2017. In early October 2017, the Department of Internal Affairs issued notice to remove two of Destiny Church's biggest charities, Destiny International Trust and Te Hahi o Nga Matamua Holdings, of their charitable status. Destiny Church took immediate legal action and subsequently to date they still retain their charitable status with the Department of Internal Affairs. In late October 2019, the High Court restored the charitable status of Destiny International Trust and Te Hāhi o Ngā Mātāmua Holdings. Destiny's lawyer Ron Mansfield confirmed that the two charities were complying with the law. In February 2022, the Department of Internal Affairs delisted four Destiny-link charities for failing to file their annual returns by 31 December 2021.

In December 2025, Newsroom reported that the Destiny Church's trust, Te Hahi O Nga Matamua Holdings Limited, owed a combined total of NZ$2.68 million to several creditors including the Inland Revenue Department (IRD) and a plumbing company. In early November 2025, the Auckland High Court granted the IRD'S application to have the company liquidated. Te Hari O Ngat Matamua Holdings is directed by Jennifer Marshall, the assistant to Tamaki, who has contested the report.

=== COVID-19 pandemic ===
During the COVID-19 pandemic in New Zealand, Destiny Church courted media attention when Bishop Tamaki announced that his movement would not close their churches in response to Government directives discouraging large gatherings of more than 100 people. In a statement on 15 March 2020, Tamaki stated that "I'm not about to let a filthy virus scare us out of having church. To equate fear with common sense is nonsense." Tamaki's stance was criticised by infectious diseases expert Dr Siouxsie Wiles, who remarked that "people like [Tamaki], former politicians, entrepreneurs are all coming out and saying all sorts of nonsense, rather than being supportive of how we're going to get through this... Instead of [Tamaki] saying 'how can we help keep New Zealanders safe', he's just stating stuff when he actually does not know anything." While Destiny Church held services on 22 March, it took precautionary steps including encouraging the sick and elderly to stay at home, having health checks, and separated 19 rooms into eight zones to manage crowd numbers. As of 28 March, Destiny Church has discontinued physical services but shifted to livestreaming sermons on its website, Facebook Live, and YouTube. In mid–2020, Tamaki announced that Destiny Church would be holding services despite the Government's alert level two restrictions limiting private gatherings including religious services to 10 people. Tamaki described the Government as "controlling parents" and called on churches to join him in opposing these restrictions as a breach of rights. In early October 2021, The New Zealand Herald reported that Destiny Church had received a total of NZ$127,903.20 in wage subsidies including $91,384.80 for its 13 employees in Auckland and $36,518.40 for six in Hamilton. On 2 October, Bishop Tamaki had organised an anti-lockdown protest, which attracted 2,000 people including families with young babies. Tamaki was subsequently charged with breaching the COVID-19 Public Health Response Act 2020 and the Alert Level 3 Order. In early November 2021, Destiny Church admitted that it played a central role in leading the anti-lockdown group The Freedoms & Rights Coalition (TFRC), which had organised nationwide anti-lockdown protests, but denied making money from the Coalition's merchandise. According to Stuff, the TFRC's web domain was owned by Jenny Marshall, the church's director of operations and Brian Tamaki's assistant. The Coalition's website solicited donations and sold merchandise including t-shirts, flags and facemasks emblazoned with anti-lockdown messaging. Marshall also confirmed that Brian Tamaki regarded himself as the "founder and architect" of the movement but claimed that the Coalition's merchandising was separate from Destiny Church's finances. In addition, Stuff reported that Brian and Hannah Tamaki maintained links with Groundswell NZ's Pukekohe and Auckland coordinator Scott Bright, who donated vegetables to the TFRC and participated in an anti-lockdown protest in his personal capacity. In late November 2021, Radio New Zealand reported that Destiny Church had leased its carpark in Wiri, Auckland for the Whānau Ora Community Clinic's testing operations. The Whānau Ora clinic, which has vaccinated tens of thousands of people at its Takanini mass vaccination centre, is owned by two prominent Destiny Church members Raewyn Bhana and George Ngatai.

=== Opposition to drag queen storytime readings ===
Destiny Church has opposed to Drag Queen Story Hour events in New Zealand. On 19 March 2024, the church objected to a proposed drag queen event at Rotorua's library by drag performers Sunita Torrance (Coco) and Daniel Lockett (Erika Flash), threatening to protest if the event proceeded. The Rotorua Lakes Council cancelled the storytime event, citing safety concerns about misinformation and violence. On 26 March 2024, members of the local Destiny Church in Gisborne painted over a rainbow crossing to protest against Erika and Coco Flash's drag queen event at the town's library. Later that day, Destiny Church members protested the reading outside the Gisborne library, where they were met by LGBT counter-protesters. Mayor of Gisborne Rehette Stoltz condemned the vandalism of the rainbow crossing, which was subsequently repainted by the Gisborne District Council. Police later arrested five individuals who attempted to vandalise the rainbow crossing a second time. Police charged two men and a woman with graffiti vandalism in connection to the Gisborne rainbow crossing incident.

Following the Gisborne protest, an upcoming Erika and CoCo Flash Rainbow Story event in Hastings was cancelled by the Hastings District Council due to safety concerns. In response to Destiny Church's actions, the Labour Party's rainbow spokesperson Shanan Halbert described the church's behaviour as "very disappointing." While Halbert supported the right to protest, he condemned what he regarded as "vicious discrimination against young people and their families." On 15 April 2024, Ford O'Connor, a member of Destiny Church who is married to Tamaki's granddaughter, pleaded guilty to vandalising the Karangahape Road rainbow crossing in central Auckland on 28 March. O'Connor was fined $16,093 to cover the repair costs for the crossing. During the sentencing, Tamaki expressed support for O'Connor, saying that "he undertook a political protest against the excessive rainbow-washing that is occurring across New Zealand right now, at the expense of our taxpayers and our ratepayers."

In late April 2024, Rainbow Storytime NZ's founder Sunita Torrance cancelled a future nationwide tour to focus on a defamation case against Destiny Church. By contrast, Tamaki welcomed the cancellation of the drag queen storytime tour as a victory on social media. In late June 2024, Torrance and fellow drag performer Daniel Lockett filed a lawsuit against the leadership of Destiny Church for allegedly inducing breach of contract, conspiracy to injure, unlawful means conspiracy, and defamation in relation to the disruption of their drag story events. In response, Destiny Church said it would continue to advocate for children's well-being and accused the New Zealand Herald of promoting crowdfunding for the drag performers' legal case.

On 15 February 2025, members of Destiny Church's Man Up and Legacy groups disrupted a drag performer's show at Te Atatū's library, which was attended by 30 adults and young children. Radio New Zealand reported that parents and children were intimidated by the Destiny members' protest actions. The church members' actions were condemned by Prime Minister Luxon, Mayor of Auckland Wayne Brown, Acting Waitematā District Commander Inspector Simon Walker, Labour leader Chris Hipkins and Te Atatū MP Phil Twyford. On 17 February, the Police launched an investigation into assault complaints related to the Te Atatū library protest. Twyford also called for the Charities Services to strip Destiny Church of its charitable status. On 21 February, a Niu FM radio host was dismissed by his employers due to his involvement in the Te Atatū Library protest.

Destiny Church counter-demonstrators also attended Pride events in Christchurch on 1 March and Wellington on 8 March 2025. On 12 March, Police arrested and charged four individuals with several assault charges in relation to the Te Atatū library protest. On 18 March, seven individuals linked with Destiny Church appeared at the Waitakere District Court on assault charges related to the Te Atatu Pride Festival protest.

=== Opposition to transgender rights ===
In early May 2024, Tamaki opposed the use of puberty blockers on transgender children and youth undergoing transitioning and the appointment of Dr Sue Bagshaw as the Government's lead investigator on the review of the suitability of puberty blockers in New Zealand. On 6 May, he and Pastor Derek Tait led a protest by Destiny Church members against Te Tahi Youth health service in Christchurch, which helps transgender people access healthcare. Destiny supporters were met by counter-protesters while police monitored the event.

== See also ==
- Christian right
- Christian politics in New Zealand
- Christianity in New Zealand
- Religion in New Zealand
- Māori religion
