= Vision NZ =

- Leader: Hannah Tamaki
- Secretary: Anne Williamson
- Founders: Hannah Tamaki; Brian Tamaki
- Founded: 23 May 2019
- Headquarters: 44 Bob Charles Drive, Golflands, Botany, Auckland
- Ideology: Christian fundamentalism Christian nationalism Christian right Right-wing populism Reactionarism
- Political position: Far-right
- Religion: Destiny Church
- National affiliation: Freedoms New Zealand
- Colours: Black; Blue
- MPs in the House of Representatives: 0 / 120

Website
- vision.org.nz

Vision NZ is a nationalist political party in New Zealand led by Hannah Tamaki, the co-leader of the fundamentalist Christian movement Destiny Church. Its policies have included opposition to abortion, homosexuality, immigration, and the construction of new mosques. It has supported creating a Māori-owned bank and Tūhoe ownership of Te Urewera, and has called for government funding for Destiny Church programmes.

The party was announced in May 2019. It contested the 2020 New Zealand general election both for electorate seats and the party-list vote, receiving 0.1% of the party vote and winning no seats. After the Freedoms New Zealand party formed in 2022, Vision NZ was registered as a component party of Freedoms NZ. At the 2023 election and the 2026 election, Freedoms NZ did not win any seats.

== History ==
=== Earlier parties associated with the Tamakis ===
Destiny Church was founded by Brian Tamaki in 1998 and is led by Brian and his wife Hannah Tamaki. Destiny New Zealand, a socially conservative Christian political party, was formed in 2003. The party contested the 2005 New Zealand general election; it received just over 14,000 party votes, or 0.62%, and won no seats. It was deregistered as a political party in 2007. The official founder and former leader of the Destiny Party, Richard Lewis, created the Family Party in 2007. The Destiny Church supported the Family Party in the 2008 New Zealand general election. It won no seats and was deregistered in 2010.

=== Creation and registration ===
On 23 May 2019, Hannah and Brian Tamaki announced the creation of a new party, at the time called Coalition New Zealand, with Hannah Tamaki to lead the party. She would not talk about policies at the announcement. Brian described the aim of the party to become a vehicle for the "silent majority" to express their beliefs. The party had not created a website, and in the days following the announcement, a number of other people registered relevant domain names and social media handles to stymie the party.

On 10 July 2019 the party applied to the Electoral Commission for registration. On 16 August the Electoral Commission refused registration on the grounds that the party's name and logo was likely to mislead voters. In October 2019, the party announced a new name, Vision NZ, and a new logo, and applied to the Electoral Commission for registration again. The registration was confirmed on 4 December.

The party received a broadcasting allocation of $51,821 for the 2020 election.

=== Dancing with the Stars and related events ===
In February 2020, Hannah Tamaki was understood to be a contestant on the upcoming Dancing with the Stars television show. Later that month, media company MediaWorks New Zealand announced that while Tamaki was originally going to be on the show, it had changed its mind and formally announced she was not to be in the show. A MediaWorks speaker said that "we have seen a very strong reaction, some of which has been extreme and concerning and MediaWorks does not condone bullying. We would be failing in our duty of care to everyone if we continued as planned."

After a TV presenter commented on Tamaki's inclusion in Dancing with the Stars, Vision NZ's campaign manager Jevan Goulter made a post on Facebook about the presenter. The post breached Facebook's community guidelines, media site Stuff declined to publish them, and as of February 2020 police were assessing a complaint laid about the post. Tamaki fired Goulter for these comments. Tamaki was asked by a journalist about similar comments by her husband Brian, who referred to "venomous, dirty liberal left, sexually confused antichrists", but Mrs Tamaki said she was not responsible for her husband's comments as they are not related to Vision NZ.

=== 2020 election campaign ===
By December 2019, the leaders of both major parties, Labour and National, had ruled out working with Vision NZ. In July 2020 it rejected a merger offer from the New Zealand Public Party.

Vision submitted a party list of five people for the 2020 general election, tied for the shortest list with the Heartland Party. All five also contested electorates, including Hannah Tamaki in the electorate of Waiariki.

By September 2020, Vision NZ had only registered in one Colmar Brunton poll, receiving 0.1% of support in its May 2020 poll. In all other polls it had not registered any support. An electorate poll for the Waiariki seat conducted in September 2020 showed that Vision NZ's leader, Hannah Tamaki, was only polling at 2%, compared to Labour's Tāmati Coffey at 38% and the Māori Party's Rawiri Waititi at 26%.

Vision New Zealand received 4,236 party votes at the 2020 election, or 0.1%. Hannah Tamaki received 1,171 electorate votes in Waiariki (4% of the electorate vote), coming third behind Rawiri Waititi and Tāmati Coffey. Vision NZ won no seats, but Hannah Tamaki claimed after the election that her goal had always been to unseat Labour's candidate Coffey from the Waiariki electorate, and since that seat was won by Waititi, the party had achieved that goal.

=== Alliance with Freedoms New Zealand and 2023 campaign ===
During the occupation of Parliament in August 2022, Brian Tamaki announced the creation of a new political party, Freedoms New Zealand. Vision NZ was announced at the same time to be involved with the party, and Vision has since been officially registered as a component party of Freedoms NZ.

On 31 May, Vision NZ, in conjunction with other parties associated with Freedoms NZ, sought a judicial review of the Electoral Commission's broadcasting funding decision. The commission had allocated broadcasting funds to Freedoms NZ collectively rather than as individual political parties. Vision NZ and the other plaintiffs argued that the Broadcasting Act 1989 did not clearly define what was a "group of parties" and that the Electoral Commission had not published a clear criteria for how their parties had joined forces. The New Zealand High Court dismissed the plaintiffs' claims.

On 13 July 2023, Hannah Tamaki announced that Vision NZ would be contesting all seven Māori electorates during the 2023 New Zealand general election as part of the Freedom NZ coalition. Tamaki stood as the party's candidate in the Tāmaki Makaurau electorate.

Final results from the 2023 New Zealand general election showed that Freedoms New Zealand received 0.33% of the party vote and did not win any electorate seats, meaning it will not enter parliament. Hannah Tamaki came last of five candidates in the Tāmaki Makaurau electorate, with 829 votes compared to the winning Te Pāti Māori candidate Takutai Tarsh Kemp's 10,050 votes.

=== Cuba St rainbow crossing controversy ===
In late 2024, Vision NZ party member Merania (Deanna) Roa filed for filed a judicial review application in the High Court of New Zealand challenging the legality of a rainbow-coloured pedestrian crossing installed by Wellington City Council. In documents submitted to the court, Roa argued that the council’s decision to install the crossing was unlawful, claiming it was not a "prescribed traffic control device" under the Land Transport Rule: Traffic Control Devices 2004, and that the council had acted outside its powers under the Local Government Act 2002.

In March 2025, the High Court dismissed the application, finding the council had acted lawfully and that the crossing did not pose a safety risk or contravene transport regulations. Costs were awarded against Roa and the other plaintiffs. The case attracted national media attention and drew widespread public criticism, with some claiming the action was "petty and ideologically motivated".

=== 2026 general election ===
During the 2026 general election, Vision NZ ran six candidates including party leader Hannah Tamaki and Karl Mokaraka. On 7 November, Vision NZ won 1,529 votes or 0.06% of the party vote based on preliminary results; below the five percent threshold needed to enter Parliament.

== Policies ==
Vision NZ has been described as a Christian party and a "Destiny Church-derived party", but Hannah Tamaki has insisted that Vision NZ is not a Christian party, saying that "people don't have to go to church to be members of Vision New Zealand, they don't have to go to church to vote for Vision New Zealand."

Vision opposes both abortion and homosexuality. Hannah Tamaki says that being gay is "wrong", though when discussing her opposition to gay MP Tāmati Coffey she said "If you do the work, I don’t care what you do, it’s your private life. I choose to live my Christian faith, and I don’t force that on anybody else." Brian Tamaki has said that homosexuality is a sin and has maintained there is a link between homosexuality and natural disasters.

Hannah Tamaki has called for a ban on the construction of new mosques. The party opposes immigration and has promised to ban all immigration and refugees for two years, although Tamaki backtracked on this, saying there would not be a total ban on refugees. It also seeks to remove the right of non-citizen permanent residents to vote.

Vision has supported greater financial autonomy for Māori people, including a Māori-owned bank and Tūhoe ownership of Te Urewera. Vision has called for government funding for Destiny Church programmes.

== Officeholders ==
=== List of leaders ===
No.	Name	Term start	Term end
1	Hannah Tamaki	23 May 2019	

=== List of deputy leaders ===
No.	Name	Term start	Term end
1	Heker Robertson	2 June 2023	

== Electoral results ==
Election	Candidates nominated		# of seats won	# of party votes	% of party vote
Election	Electorate	List	# of seats won	# of party votes	% of party vote
2020	5	5	0	4,237	0.15%
2023	25	N/A (Note: Contested party vote under Freedoms New Zealand.)	0	N/A	N/A
2026	4	6	0	TBD	TBD

== See also ==
- Christian politics in New Zealand
