= New Nation Party =

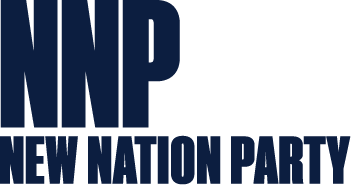
- Secretary: Melissa O'Hagan
- Founder: Michael Jacomb
- Founded: 2022
- Dissolved: 2025
- Headquarters: PO Box 47-017, Trentham, Upper Hutt
- Ideology: Anti-vaccine mandates
- Political position: Right-wing
- Colours: Blue
- MPs in the House of Representatives: 0 / 120

Website
- nnparty.co.nz

The New Nation Party was a political party in New Zealand. It was first led by Michael Jacomb and later, Guy Slocum. The party opposed vaccine mandates, Three Waters, and the United Nations.

== History ==
The party stood former Tauranga City councillor Andrew Hollis as a candidate at the 2022 Tauranga by-election. He received 260 votes.

The party applied for registration on 27 March 2023. It was registered on 12 April 2023.

The party was previously a component party of Freedoms New Zealand. On 21 July 2023, the party notified the Electoral Commission that it was no longer a component party of Freedoms New Zealand.

Polling conducted for 1News, between the party's founding and mid-September 2023, indicated the party's support at between 0.1% and 0.5%.

In the 2023 general election, New Nation Party received 0.05% of the party vote – 1,530 votes, the lowest result of any party – and did not win any electorate seats, meaning it did not enter parliament.

On 29 January 2025, the Electoral Commission deregistered the party at its own request.

== Officeholders ==
List of leaders

No.	Name	Term of office	
1	Michael Jacomb	2022	c. October 2023
2	Guy Slocum	c. December 2023	c. 29 January 2025

List of deputy leaders

No.	Name	Term of office		Leader
1	Guy Slocum	16 January 2023	c. October 2023	Jacomb
