= Waiomu =

Rural settlement in New Zealand

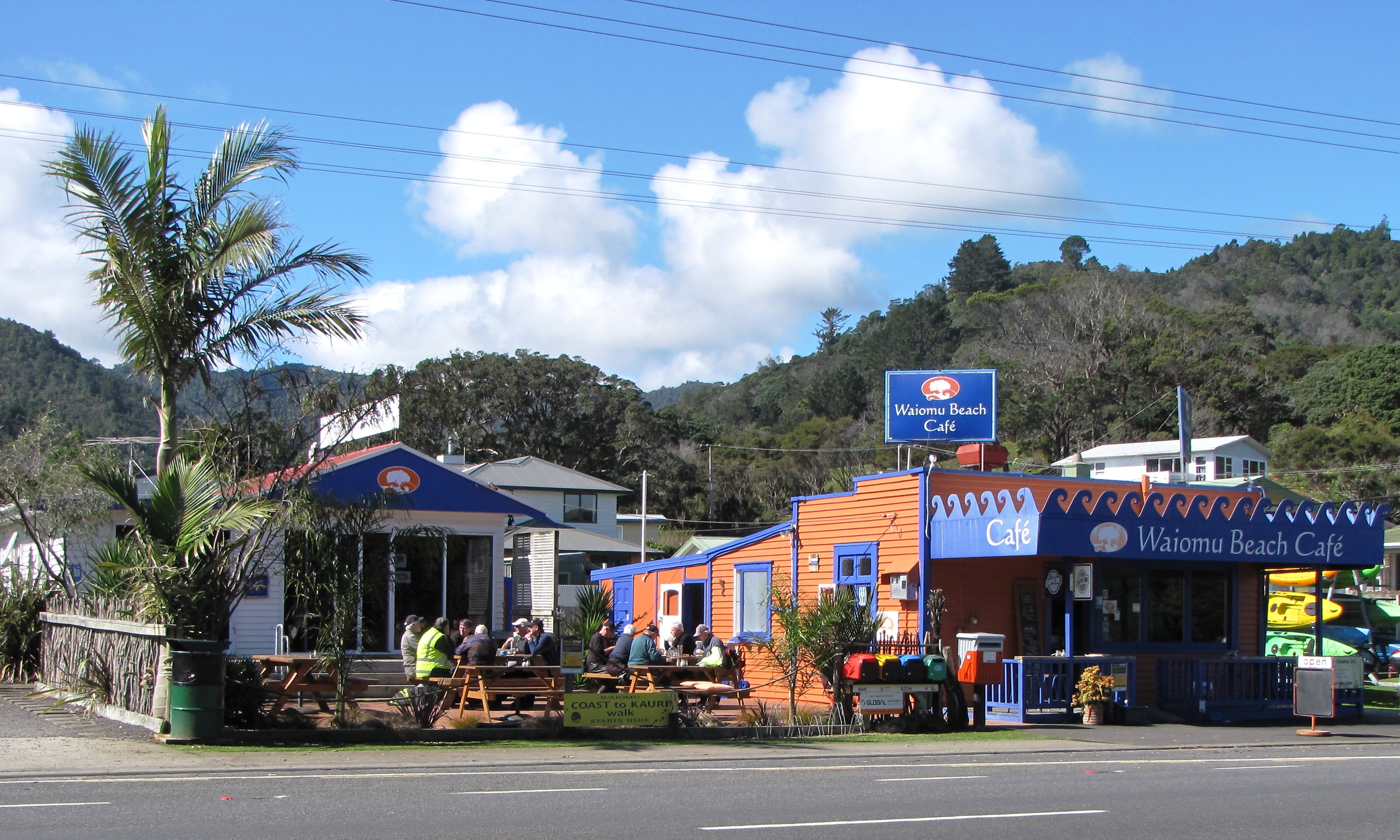
- Waiomu Beach Café
- Interactive map of Waiomu
- Coordinates: 37.027°S 175.516°E
- Country: New Zealand
- Region: Waikato
- District: Thames-Coromandel District
- Ward: Thames ward
- Community Board: Thames Community
- Electorates: Coromandel; Hauraki-Waikato (Māori)

Government
  - Council: Thames-Coromandel District Council
  - Regional council: Waikato Regional Council
  - Mayor of Thames-Coromandel: Peter Revell
  - Coromandel MP: Scott Simpson
  - Hauraki-Waikato MP: Hana-Rawhiti Maipi-Clarke

Area
  - Total: 3.83 km^{2} (1.48 sq mi)

Population (June 2025)
  - Total: 350
  - Density: 91/km^{2} (240/sq mi)

Waiomu is a settlement on the west coast of the Coromandel Peninsula of New Zealand, between Tapu to the north and Te Puru to the south. State Highway 25 runs through it.

Waiomu Kauri Grove Walk is a hiking trail to a stand of New Zealand kauri trees in Coromandel Forest Park.

In the hills above Waiomu lays the abandoned Monowai mine. Parts of it can be seen on the Waiomu Kauri Grove Walk.

== Etymology ==
The New Zealand Gazetteer says the name comes from the local Waiomu Stream, which was earlier called Te Wai-o-Mu. Mu was a chief who died in a battle in the late 17th century. Place Names of New Zealand says the name is a shortening of Waioumu, which means "The waters shaped like a cooking oven".

== Demographics ==
Waiomū is described by Stats NZ as a rural settlement. It covers 3.83 km^{2} (1.48 sq mi) and had an estimated population of 350 as of June 2025, with a population density of 91 people per km^{2}. Waiomu is part of the larger Thames Coast statistical area.

Historical population
Year	Pop.	±% p.a.
2006	384	—
2013	339	−1.76%
2018	354	+0.87%
2023	360	+0.34%

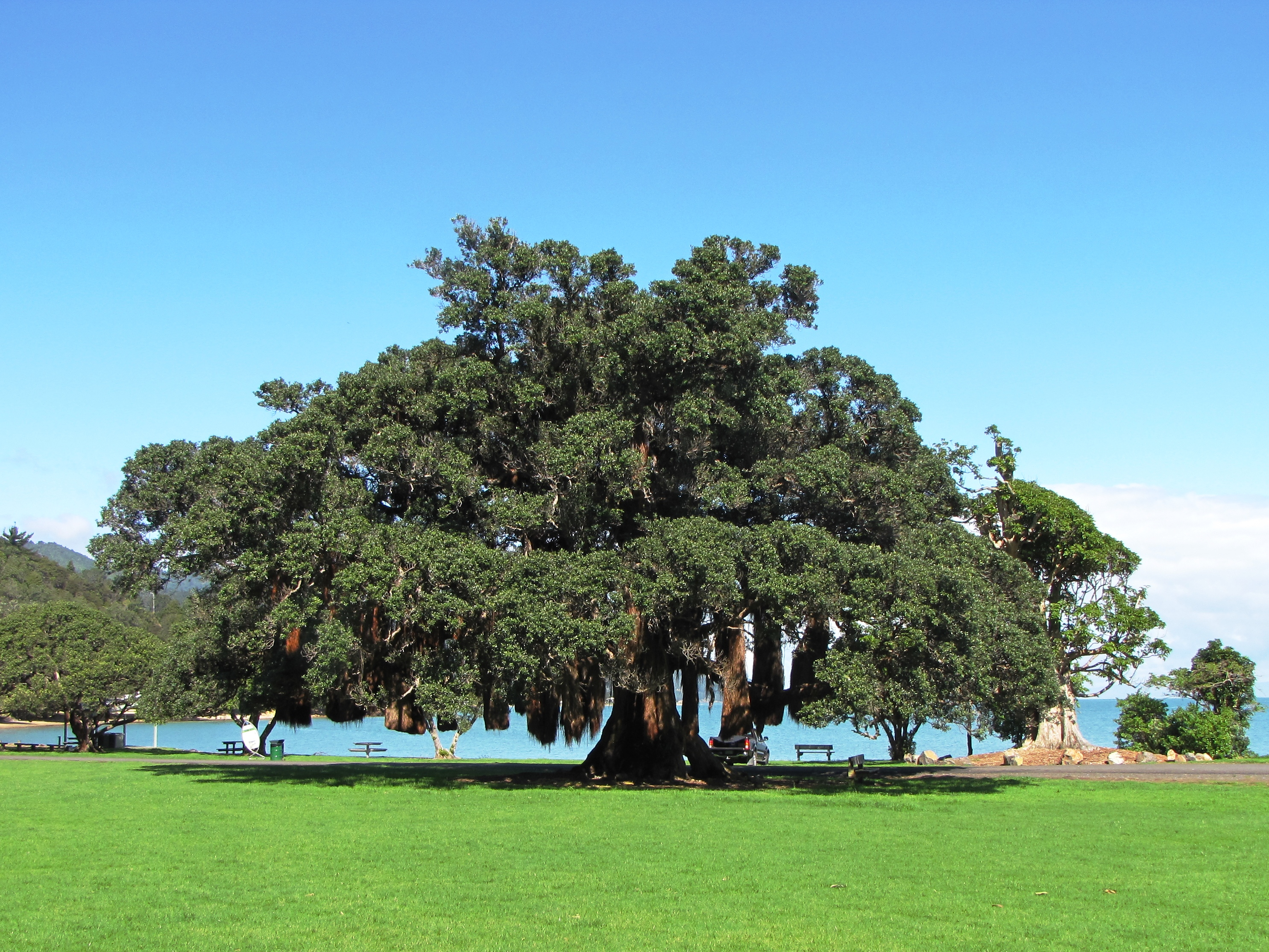
Waiomu Beach reserve

Waiomū had a population of 360 in the 2023 New Zealand census, an increase of 6 people (1.7%) since the 2018 census, and an increase of 21 people (6.2%) since the 2013 census. There were 174 males, 186 females and 3 people of other genders in 135 dwellings. 3.3% of people identified as LGBTIQ+. The median age was 59.7 years (compared with 38.1 years nationally). There were 36 people (10.0%) aged under 15 years, 30 (8.3%) aged 15 to 29, 162 (45.0%) aged 30 to 64, and 132 (36.7%) aged 65 or older.

People could identify as more than one ethnicity. The results were 80.0% European (Pākehā); 28.3% Māori; 1.7% Pasifika; 0.8% Asian; 0.8% Middle Eastern, Latin American and African New Zealanders (MELAA); and 6.7% other, which includes people giving their ethnicity as "New Zealander". English was spoken by 100.0%, Māori language by 5.8%, and other languages by 5.0%. No language could be spoken by 0.8% (e.g. too young to talk). New Zealand Sign Language was known by 0.8%. The percentage of people born overseas was 10.0, compared with 28.8% nationally.

Religious affiliations were 30.8% Christian, 2.5% Māori religious beliefs, 0.8% Buddhist, 1.7% New Age, and 1.7% other religions. People who answered that they had no religion were 55.8%, and 8.3% of people did not answer the census question.

Of those at least 15 years old, 51 (15.7%) people had a bachelor's or higher degree, 189 (58.3%) had a post-high school certificate or diploma, and 84 (25.9%) people exclusively held high school qualifications. The median income was $30,800, compared with $41,500 nationally. 24 people (7.4%) earned over $100,000 compared to 12.1% nationally. The employment status of those at least 15 was that 120 (37.0%) people were employed full-time, 48 (14.8%) were part-time, and 6 (1.9%) were unemployed.

== Notable people ==
- Dawn McMillan, children's writer
