= Thornton Bay =

Rural settlement in Waikato, New Zealand

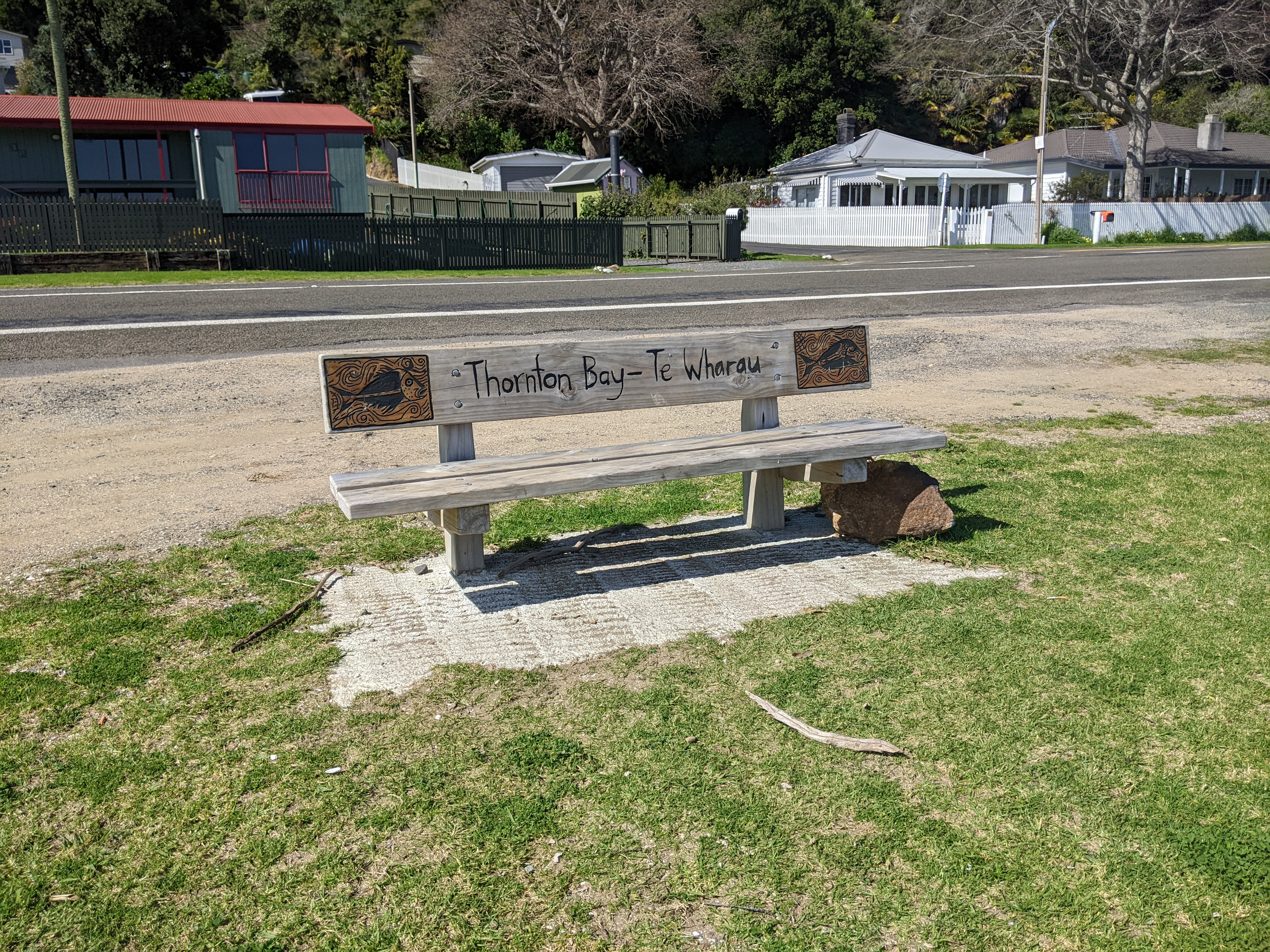
- Bench seat at Thornton Bay
- Interactive map of Thornton Bay
- Coordinates: 37.063°S 175.524°E
- Country: New Zealand
- Region: Waikato
- District: Thames-Coromandel District
- Ward: Thames ward
- Community Board: Thames Community
- Electorates: Coromandel; Hauraki-Waikato (Māori)

Government
  - Council: Thames-Coromandel District Council
  - Regional council: Waikato Regional Council
  - Mayor of Thames-Coromandel: Peter Revell
  - Coromandel MP: Scott Simpson
  - Hauraki-Waikato MP: Hana-Rawhiti Maipi-Clarke

Area
  - Total: 0.95 km^{2} (0.37 sq mi)

Population (June 2025)
  - Total: 280
  - Density: 290/km^{2} (760/sq mi)

Thornton Bay is a settlement on the west coast of the Coromandel Peninsula of New Zealand, between Te Puru to the north and Ngarimu Bay to the south. State Highway 25 runs through it.

Thornton's Bay was named for R. Thornton, an orchardist who settled in the area in 1890. Ngarimu Bay is named after Moana-Nui-a-Kiwa Ngarimu, the first Māori person to be awarded the Victoria Cross.

== Demographics ==
Thornton Bay-Ngārimu Bay is described by Statistics New Zealand as a rural settlement. It covers 0.95 km^{2} (0.37 sq mi) and had an estimated population of 280 as of June 2025, with a population density of 295 people per km^{2}. Thornton Bay-Ngārimu Bay is part of the larger Thames Coast statistical area.

Historical population
Year	Pop.	±% p.a.
2006	312	—
2013	276	−1.74%
2018	309	+2.28%
2023	285	−1.60%

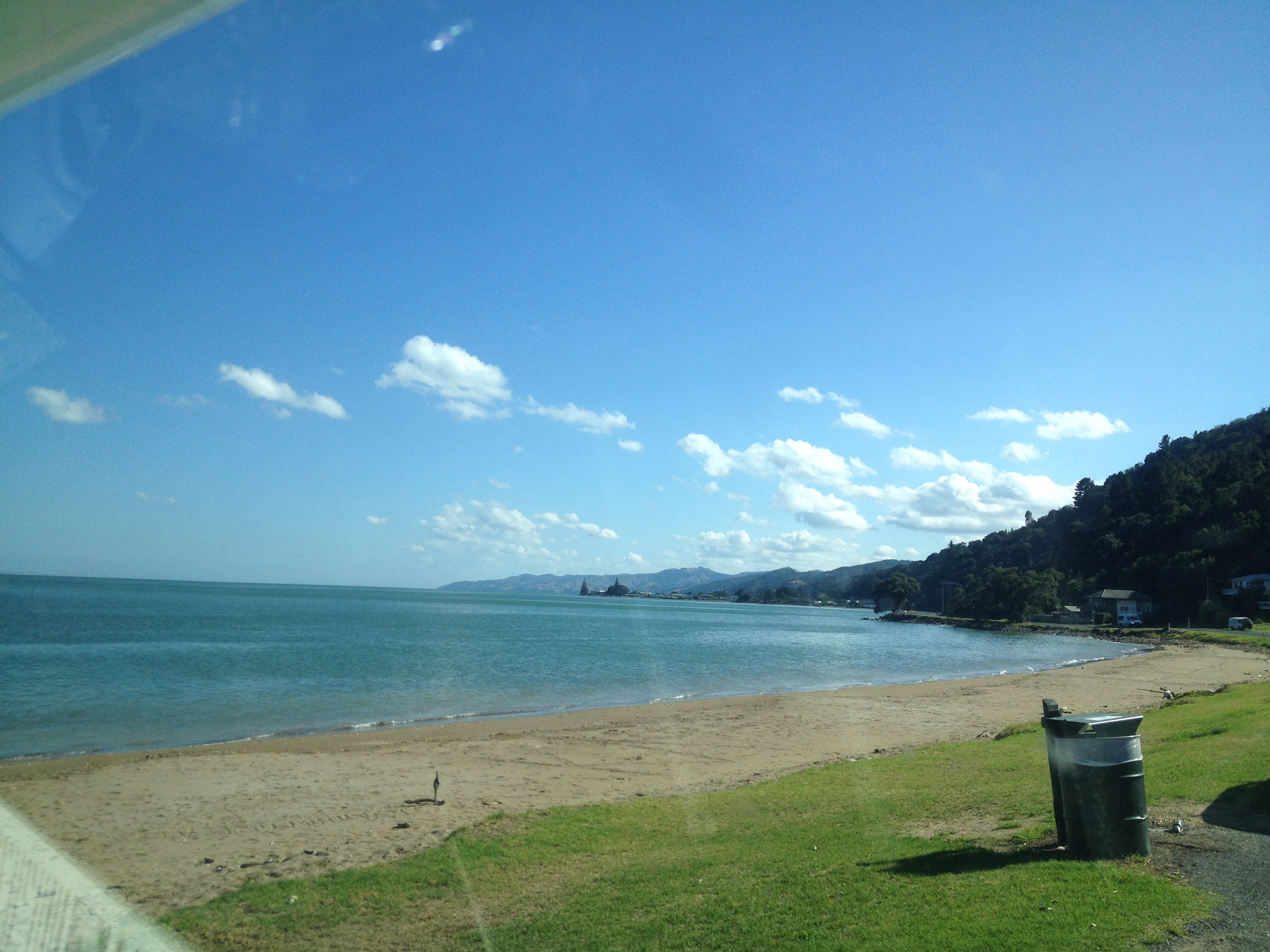
Thornton Bay

Thornton Bay-Ngārimu Bay had a population of 285 in the 2023 New Zealand census, a decrease of 24 people (−7.8%) since the 2018 census, and an increase of 9 people (3.3%) since the 2013 census. There were 141 males and 147 females in 123 dwellings. 3.2% of people identified as LGBTIQ+. The median age was 61.8 years (compared with 38.1 years nationally). There were 18 people (6.3%) aged under 15 years, 24 (8.4%) aged 15 to 29, 123 (43.2%) aged 30 to 64, and 120 (42.1%) aged 65 or older.

People could identify as more than one ethnicity. The results were 94.7% European (Pākehā); 11.6% Māori; 1.1% Pasifika; 1.1% Middle Eastern, Latin American and African New Zealanders (MELAA); and 3.2% other, which includes people giving their ethnicity as "New Zealander". English was spoken by 97.9%, Māori language by 3.2%, Samoan by 1.1%, and other languages by 3.2%. No language could be spoken by 1.1% (e.g. too young to talk). The percentage of people born overseas was 16.8, compared with 28.8% nationally.

Religious affiliations were 33.7% Christian, 1.1% Buddhist, and 1.1% other religions. People who answered that they had no religion were 53.7%, and 10.5% of people did not answer the census question.

Of those at least 15 years old, 63 (23.6%) people had a bachelor's or higher degree, 138 (51.7%) had a post-high school certificate or diploma, and 63 (23.6%) people exclusively held high school qualifications. The median income was $30,000, compared with $41,500 nationally. 21 people (7.9%) earned over $100,000 compared to 12.1% nationally. The employment status of those at least 15 was that 99 (37.1%) people were employed full-time, 48 (18.0%) were part-time, and 3 (1.1%) were unemployed.
