= Te Puru =

Rural settlement in New Zealand

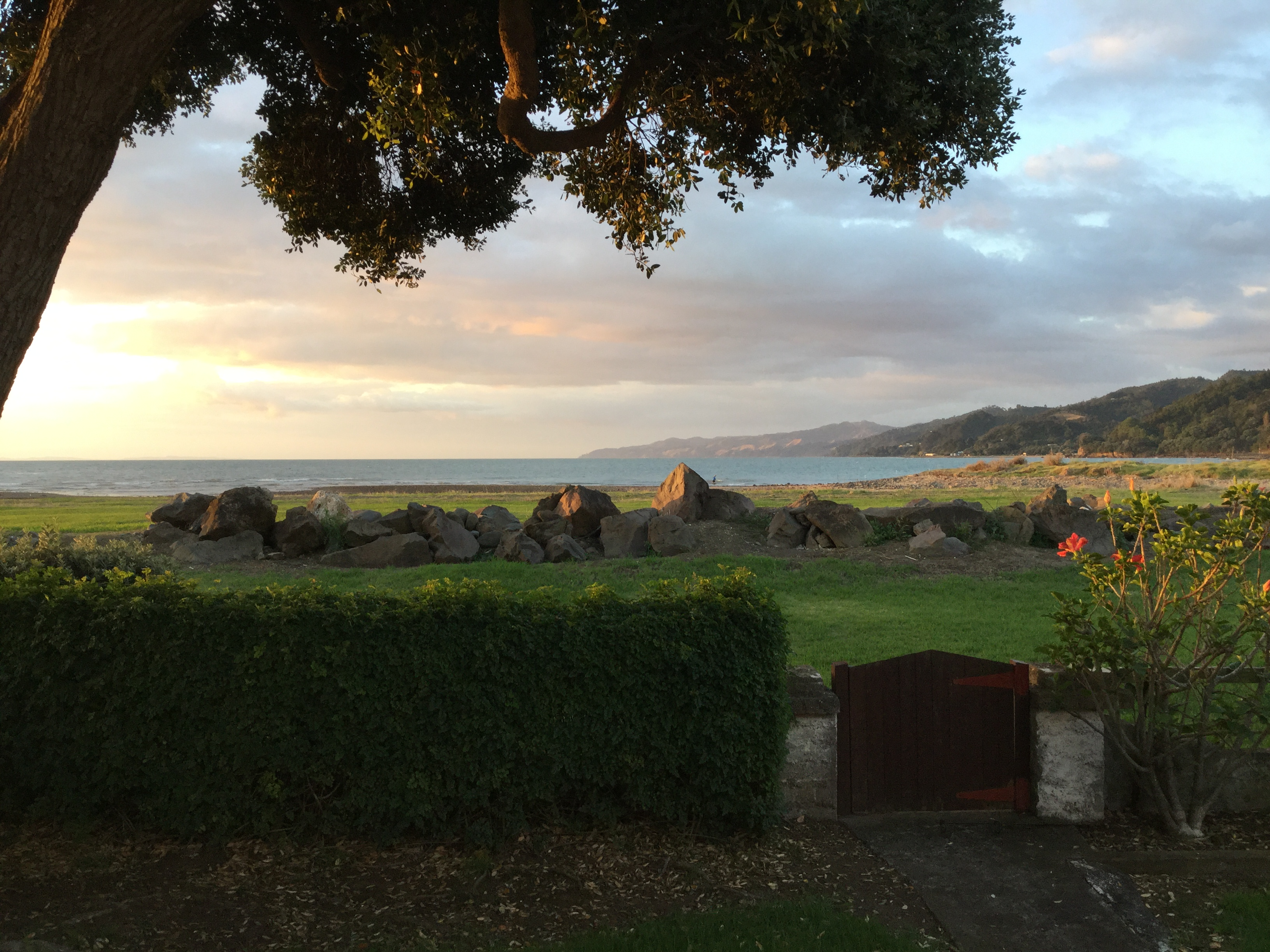
- View from a bach at Te Puru
- Interactive map of Te Puru
- Coordinates: 37°2′48″S 175°31′18″E
- Country: New Zealand
- Region: Waikato
- District: Thames-Coromandel District
- Ward: Thames ward
- Community Board: Thames Community
- Electorates: Coromandel; Hauraki-Waikato (Māori)

Government
  - Council: Thames-Coromandel District Council
  - Regional council: Waikato Regional Council
  - Mayor of Thames-Coromandel: Peter Revell
  - Coromandel MP: Scott Simpson
  - Hauraki-Waikato MP: Hana-Rawhiti Maipi-Clarke

Area
  - Total: 1.96 km^{2} (0.76 sq mi)

Population (June 2025)
  - Total: 490
  - Density: 250/km^{2} (650/sq mi)

Te Puru is a locality on the western side of the Coromandel Peninsula of New Zealand. State Highway 25 runs through it. Tapu lies about 7 km to the north, and Thames is about 12 km to the south. The Te Puru Stream and about 18 tributaries drain a steep hilly 23 km^{2} area of the Coromandel Range, almost entirely covered by native forest. It runs through the settlement and into the Firth of Thames to the west. Flooding has been a problem.

Te Puru track runs between Te Puru and Tapu-Coroglen road, intersecting with Waiomu Valley and Crosbies Main Range tramping tracks on the way.

== Demographics ==
Te Puru is described by Statistics New Zealand as a rural settlement. It covers 1.96 km^{2} (0.76 sq mi) and had an estimated population of 490 as of June 2025, with a population density of 250 people per km^{2}. Te Puru is part of the larger Thames Coast statistical area.

Historical population of Te Puru
Year	Pop.	±% p.a.
2006	540	—
2013	501	−1.07%
2018	537	+1.40%
2023	510	−1.03%

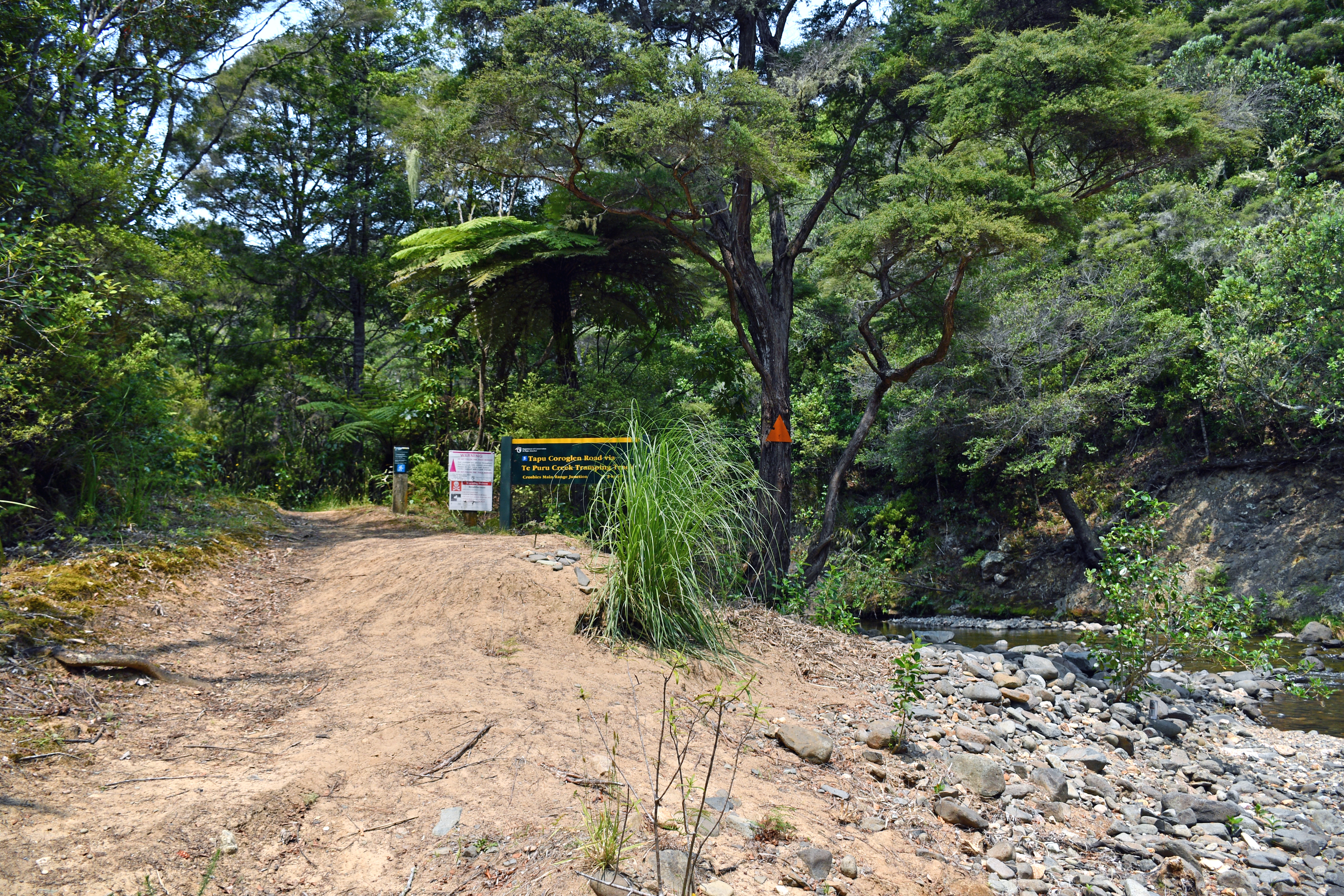
Te Puru Track entrance

Te Puru had a population of 510 in the 2023 New Zealand census, a decrease of 27 people (−5.0%) since the 2018 census, and an increase of 9 people (1.8%) since the 2013 census. There were 252 males, 255 females and 3 people of other genders in 213 dwellings. 3.5% of people identified as LGBTIQ+. The median age was 57.9 years (compared with 38.1 years nationally). There were 60 people (11.8%) aged under 15 years, 66 (12.9%) aged 15 to 29, 198 (38.8%) aged 30 to 64, and 189 (37.1%) aged 65 or older.

People could identify as more than one ethnicity. The results were 86.5% European (Pākehā), 25.9% Māori, 1.8% Pasifika, 3.5% Asian, and 2.9% other, which includes people giving their ethnicity as "New Zealander". English was spoken by 98.8%, Māori language by 3.5%, and other languages by 4.1%. No language could be spoken by 0.6% (e.g. too young to talk). New Zealand Sign Language was known by 0.6%. The percentage of people born overseas was 14.1, compared with 28.8% nationally.

Religious affiliations were 24.7% Christian, 2.4% Māori religious beliefs, 0.6% Buddhist, 0.6% New Age, and 1.8% other religions. People who answered that they had no religion were 57.1%, and 13.5% of people did not answer the census question.

Of those at least 15 years old, 72 (16.0%) people had a bachelor's or higher degree, 249 (55.3%) had a post-high school certificate or diploma, and 129 (28.7%) people exclusively held high school qualifications. The median income was $28,200, compared with $41,500 nationally. 24 people (5.3%) earned over $100,000 compared to 12.1% nationally. The employment status of those at least 15 was that 147 (32.7%) people were employed full-time, 63 (14.0%) were part-time, and 15 (3.3%) were unemployed.

=== Thames Coast statistical area ===
Thames Coast statistical area, which also includes Tapu, Waiomu, Thornton Bay and Ngarimu Bay, covers 116.11 km^{2} (44.83 sq mi) and had an estimated population of 1,680 as of June 2025, with a population density of 14 people per km^{2}.

Historical population for Thames Coast
Year	Pop.	±% p.a.
2006	1,710	—
2013	1,533	−1.55%
2018	1,704	+2.14%
2023	1,734	+0.35%

Thames Coast had a population of 1,734 in the 2023 New Zealand census, an increase of 30 people (1.8%) since the 2018 census, and an increase of 201 people (13.1%) since the 2013 census. There were 861 males, 867 females and 6 people of other genders in 666 dwellings. 2.6% of people identified as LGBTIQ+. The median age was 60.2 years (compared with 38.1 years nationally). There were 165 people (9.5%) aged under 15 years, 177 (10.2%) aged 15 to 29, 732 (42.2%) aged 30 to 64, and 663 (38.2%) aged 65 or older.

People could identify as more than one ethnicity. The results were 87.5% European (Pākehā); 22.1% Māori; 1.7% Pasifika; 1.6% Asian; 0.5% Middle Eastern, Latin American and African New Zealanders (MELAA); and 4.2% other, which includes people giving their ethnicity as "New Zealander". English was spoken by 98.8%, Māori language by 4.2%, Samoan by 0.2%, and other languages by 4.5%. No language could be spoken by 0.5% (e.g. too young to talk). New Zealand Sign Language was known by 0.3%. The percentage of people born overseas was 13.8, compared with 28.8% nationally.

Religious affiliations were 27.5% Christian, 0.2% Islam, 1.9% Māori religious beliefs, 0.5% Buddhist, 0.9% New Age, and 1.9% other religions. People who answered that they had no religion were 57.4%, and 10.4% of people did not answer the census question.

Of those at least 15 years old, 273 (17.4%) people had a bachelor's or higher degree, 864 (55.1%) had a post-high school certificate or diploma, and 438 (27.9%) people exclusively held high school qualifications. The median income was $28,700, compared with $41,500 nationally. 93 people (5.9%) earned over $100,000 compared to 12.1% nationally. The employment status of those at least 15 was that 525 (33.5%) people were employed full-time, 246 (15.7%) were part-time, and 36 (2.3%) were unemployed.

== Education ==
Te Puru School is a coeducational full primary (years 1–8) school with a roll of 168 students as of July 2026.

== History ==
Te Puru suffered severe flooding in 2002, when a low-pressure system led to extensive flooding on the Coromandel Peninsula and the south-west Waikato region. Te Puru and Waiomu were included in the ‘high impact’ area of the storm. Private and public property was damaged during the flood.
