= Russia Sanctions Act 2022 =

Act of Parliament in New Zealand

New Zealand Parliament
- Royal assent: 11 March 2022

Legislative history
- Introduced by: Nanaia Mahuta
- First reading: 9 March 2022
- Second reading: 9 March 2022
- Third reading: 9 March 2022
- Status: Current legislation

The Russia Sanctions Act 2022 is an Act of Parliament passed by the New Zealand Parliament that establishes the framework for autonomous sanctions against Russia in response to its 2022 invasion of Ukraine. This legislation would allow sanctions to be placed on those responsible for or associated with the Russian invasion of Ukraine including people, services, companies and assets. The Sanctions Act also allows for sanctions to be imposed on other states complicit with Russian aggression including Belarus. On 9 March 2022, the Russian Sanctions Act passed with unanimous support from all parties represented in Parliament.

== Key provisions ==
The Russia Sanctions Act enables New Zealand to impose and enforce sanctions in response to the Russian invasion of Ukraine that began on 22 February 2022. These sanctions operate independently of the United Nations framework and cover military actions by Russia as well as countries or persons who may be assisting Russia.

Major provisions include:

- Freezing assets based in New Zealand;
- Preventing people and companies from moving their money and assets to New Zealand in order to escape foreign sanctions;
- Banning super yachts, ships and aircraft from entering New Zealand waters and airspace;
- Creating a register listing sanctioned individuals, assets, and services.

The Russia Sanctions Act also imposed fines and terms of imprisonment for the following offenses:

- Individuals breaching sanctions are subject to a seven-year prison term or a fine not exceeding NZ$100,000.
- Entities violating the sanctions are subject to a fine not exceeding NZ$1 million.
- Individuals subject to these offenses include those who have knowingly supplied false or misleading information or omitted information about activities proscribed by the Sanctions Act. These are subject to a seven-year prison term or a fine not exceeding NZ$100,000.
- Individuals who knowingly fail to provide a report on proscribed activities, or provide misleading and false information regarding these activities are subject to a one year prison term or a fine not exceeding NZ$20,000.
- Entities who knowingly fail to provide a report on proscribed activities, or provide misleading and false information regarding these activities are subject to a fine not exceeding NZ$200,000.

Legal proceedings can be taken in response to violations that have occurred outside of New Zealand. Extraterritorial jurisdiction for offences applies to:

- New Zealand citizens, residents or entities registered in New Zealand.
- Ships and aircraft registered with New Zealand maritime, civil aviation and the New Zealand Defence Force.

== History ==
=== Background ===
In response to escalating border tensions between Russian and Ukraine in early 2022, New Zealand Minister of Foreign Affairs Nanaia Mahuta criticised the Russian military buildup and expressed support for Ukraine's sovereignty and territorial integrity. In addition, Prime Minister Jacinda Ardern warned that New Zealand was considering applying targeted sanctions against Russia. Following the Russian invasion of Ukraine that began on 24 February 2022, Ardern condemned Russia's invasion and called on Moscow to withdraw from Ukraine. In addition, the Sixth Labour Government suspended high-level diplomatic contacts with Russia and introduced travel bans and export controls.

On 2 March 2022, New Zealand joined 140 states in voting for United Nations General Assembly Resolution ES-11/1 which condemned the Russian invasion of Ukraine and demanded a full Russian military withdrawal. That same day, New Zealand joined 39 other states that were parties to the Rome Statute in formally referring the Ukrainian situation to the Prosecutor of the International Criminal Court. On 7 March, Ardern announced that the New Zealand Government would be introducing legislation to impose autonomous sanctions on Russia outside the framework of the United Nations. The sanctions legislation would also apply to other states complicit with Russian aggression against Ukraine including Belarus.

On 7 March, the Russian state news agency Tass reported that the Russian Government had included New Zealand within a list of foreign states and territories that committed "unfriendly actions" against Russia, Russian companies, and Russian citizens. Other countries on the list included the United States, Canada, European Union, the United Kingdom, Japan, South Korea, Australia, Micronesia, Singapore, and Taiwan.

=== Legislative passage ===
The Russia Sanctions Act passed its first reading on 9 March 2022. Foreign Minister Mahuta formally introduced the bill, justifying it as a response to Russian aggression. Māori Party co-leader Rawiri Waititi supported the bill but questioned New Zealand's failure to condemn the United States' invasions of Afghanistan and Iraq, and the Israeli occupation of Palestine. National Party Member of Parliament Todd McClay supported the Bill but criticised the Government's perceived slowness in adopting autonomous sanctions legislation.

The Bill's second reading was also held on 9 March. National MPs Gerry Brownlee supported the Bill but criticised the Labour Government's perceived slow response to Russian actions in Ukraine and calling for the expulsion of the Russian Ambassador to New Zealand. Brownlee also praised dairy company Fonterra for suspending its export trade with Russia. Andrew Little, the Minister responsible for the signals intelligence agency Government Communications Security Bureau (GCSB), defended his Government's response; citing the failure of the previous Fifth National Government to impose autonomous sanctions on Russia following the 2014 annexation of Crimea.

Fellow National MP Simon O'Connor questioned the effectiveness of the United Nations for resolving conflict and dealing with human rights issues. In addition, several MPs Labour MPs Phil Twyford, Ibrahim Omer, Ingrid Leary, Green Party co-leader James Shaw, ACT deputy leader Brooke Van Velden, National MP Mark Mitchell spoke in favour of the legislation while discussing the conflict in Ukraine and the effectiveness of the United Nations. Labour MP Tangi Utikere formally commended the Bill to the House.

During the in-committee stage, Shaw submitted fellow Green MP Golriz Ghahraman's supplementary order paper that the Bill include the amendment that the Foreign Minister "must also have regard to relevant resolutions of the United Nations General Assembly." O'Connor criticised the proposed amendment on the grounds that the legislation's purpose was to ensure that New Zealand's ability to impose autonomous sanctions would not be bogged down by the United Nations process. Parliament rejected Ghahraman's amendment by a margin of 108 (Labour, National, ACT) to 10 votes (Greens).

The Bill passed its third reading in the late hours of 9 March. The bill's sponsor Mahuta emphasised the cross-party support the Bill received and highlighted New Zealand's humanitarian assistance. Brownlee reiterated the National Party's support for the sanctions legislation while O'Connor praised Mahuta's willingness to explore wider autonomous sanctions and laws similar to the American Magnitsky Act. Labour MP David Parker and Green co-leader Shaw spoke about Russian human rights abuses and economic mismanagement. ACT leader David Seymour also emphasised the need to differentiate ordinary Russians from Putin and the Russian Government. Labour MP Vanushi Walters formally commended the legislation to the House.

=== Enforcement ===
==== 2022 ====
On 18 March, Mahuta confirmed that 364 additional political and military targets had been added to the travel ban list as part of its first tranche of sanctions. In addition 13 individuals and 19 entities were added to the targeted sanctions list, including the prohibition of maritime vessels, aircraft, and the freezing of assets. The sanctions register was published on the Ministry of Foreign Affairs and Trade's (MFAT) website. Notable proscribed individuals included Russian President Vladimir Putin, Prime Minister Mikhail Mishustin, and Foreign Minister Sergey Lavrov. In addition, the New Zealand Government established a Russia Sanctions Unit across agencies to enforce the provisions of the Russian Sanctions Act 2022.

On 6 April, Mahuta and Trade and Export Growth Minister Damien O'Connor announced that the New Zealand Government would impose a 35% tariff on all imports from Russia while extending the prohibition on exporting industrial products connected to strategic Russian industries. This tariff is part of the framework of the Russia Sanctions Act.

On 19 April, the New Zealand Government sanctioned 18 Russian financial entities including the Central Bank of Russia, the Russian National Wealth Fund, and several major banks deemed to be linked to Russian oligarchs, the Russian military, and the annexation of Crimea. Mahuta estimated that these financial institutions accounted for 80% of Russia's banking assets.

On 2 May, the New Zealand Government sanctioned the 170 members of the Russian upper house (the Federation Council) and six organisations and companies in the Russian defence sector deemed to have contributed to the Russian invasion of Ukraine.

On 7 June, Mahuta announced that the New Zealand Government had sanctioned 44 Russian state-owned enterprises including gas exporter Gazprom, various defence and industrial entities, and six Belarusian defence entities.

On 4 July, the New Zealand Government banned all imports of Russian gold following similar bans by G7 countries and Australia. The ban came into effect on 25 July 2022.

On 1 August, Mahuta announced that the Government had widened its sanctions to target the so-called Russian "military industrial complex" including the branches and independent arms of the Russian Armed Forces, logistical providers, and defence contractors. Notable entities targeted by the sanctions included the insurance company SOGAZ and Russian Railways.

On 27 September, the New Zealand Government sanctioned 19 further individuals including Federal Ministers, non-permanent members of the Security Council of Russia, Putin's relatives and Head of the Chechen Republic Ramzan Kadyrov. Mahuta also denounced the 2022 annexation referendums in Russian-occupied Ukraine as a breach of international law.

On 11 October, the New Zealand Government sanctioned 24 officials from four Ukrainian regions that Russian had annexed. In addition, sanctions were extended to all members of the State Duma and the Federation Council and 51 oligarchs including New Zealand-linked Alexander Abramov. In addition, New Zealand extended its 35% tariff on Russian imports until March 2025. These sanctions had led to a 75% drop in Russian imports to New Zealand.

On 21 November, the New Zealand Government sanctioned 22 members of the Russian and Belarusian elite including Putin's daughters Maria Vorontsova and Katerina Tikhonova, the wife and children of Putin's press secretary Dmitry Peskov, the Central Bank of Russia's Governor Elvira Nabiullina, and the wife and son of Belarusian President Alexander Lukashenko.

On 14 December, the New Zealand Government imposed sanctions on Islamic Revolutionary Guard Corps Commanders Saeed Aghajani and Amir Ali Hajizadeh, Chief of the General Staff of the Armed Forces of the Islamic Republic of Iran Mohammad Bagheri and drone manufacturer Shahed Aviation Industries; making Iran the third country to be sanctioned under the Russian Sanctions Act. Mahuta stated that the sanctions had been imposed on Iran were because of its role in "supplying weapons technology to Russia causing death and injury to Ukrainian civilians."

==== 2024 ====
On 28 February 2024, the New Zealand Government imposed further sanctions including the G7's price cap on Russian oil imports, prohibiting the export of restricted items to Russia and Belarus via third countries and designating 61 companies and individuals for evading sanctions.

On 28 November 2024, Peters announced a new tranche of sanctions targeting Russia's procurement of chemical weapons and missiles in response to the Organisation for the Prohibition of Chemical Weapons' findings that Russia was using illegal riot control agents in Ukraine. These sanctions also targeted Iranians involved in the sale of ballistic missiles and drones to Russia, as well as the Russians facilitating this trade. That same day, the Australian and New Zealand governments endorsed a joint Call to Action against Russian and North Korean shadow fleet activity.

==== 2026 ====
On 8 August 2026, New Zealand sanctioned 33 individuals and groups supporting the Russian invasion of Ukraine. This round focused on targeting cyber actors and this involved in the forced relocation, abduction and reeducation of Ukraine no Ian children. This marked the 36th round of New Zealand's sanctions against Russian under the Act. By early August 2026, over 2,000 individuals, entities and vessels had been sanctioned by New Zealand.

== Responses ==
=== New Zealand responses ===
In early September 2022, ExportNZ chairman and Foot Science International founder Brian Boyd expressed concern that the New Zealand Government's sanctions regime lacked consistency and were targeting Russian civilians. While the Sanctions Act did not restrict the export of food and medical supplies to Russia including orthodic insoles, New Zealand suppliers were having difficulty distributing their products in Russia due to banks being unwilling to handle such transactions.

On 23 May 2024, the Social Security Appeal Authority ruled that two Russian women were entitled to receiving their full New Zealand taxypayer-funded pensions after their Russian pension benefit payments were suspended due to sanctions imposed on Russia. Prior to the Authority's ruling, the two women had been receiving NZ superannuation at reduced levels, offset by their Russian pensions which they had stopped receiving in 2021 and 2022 respectively.

=== Russian responses ===
On 8 April, the Russian Government banned 130 New Zealand political figures, defence and intelligence officials from entering Russia. Those on the blacklist include Prime Minister Jacinda Ardern, all 120 Members of Parliament, Governor-General Cindy Kiro, New Zealand Security Intelligence Service (NZSIS) Director-General Rebecca Kitteridge, Government Communications Security Bureau (GCSB) Director-General Andrew Hampton, and Defence Force Chief Air Marshal Kevin Short. The Russian Ministry of Foreign Affairs accused Wellington of pursuing a Russophobic foreign policy that lacked independence and was "servile" towards other Western powers.

On 31 July, the Russian Government banned 32 further New Zealand officials, civil society leaders, and journalists from entering Russia indefinitely, accusing them of promoting a Russophobic agenda and stating it was a response to New Zealand sanctions on Russian citizens. The banned individuals have included Mayor of Auckland Phil Goff, Mayor of Christchurch Lianne Dalziel, Mayor of Wellington Andy Foster, Mayor of Nelson Rachel Reese, Mayor of Dunedin Aaron Hawkins, The New Zealand Herald journalist and political columnist Matthew Hooton, and University of Auckland political scientist Dr Stephen Hoadley.

On 1 August, the Russian State Duma introduced legislation to ban the adoption of Russian children by several "unfriendly countries" including the United States, Australia, Canada, the United Kingdom, New Zealand, Japan, South Korea, and all European Union member states. In 2012, the Russian Government had passed the Dima Yakovlev Law, which banned American families from adopting Russian children in retaliation for the Magnitsky Act.

In late June 2024, Russia issued a fourth list banning 36 New Zealanders including journalists, scholars, defence personnel, public servants and several mayors including Mayor of Wellington Tory Whanau, Mayor of Napier Kirsten Wise, Mayor of Hamilton Paula Southgate, Mayor of Nelson Nick Smith and Mayor of New Plymouth Neil Holdom.
