= Aghajani =

Aghajani is a surname. Notable people with the surname include:

- Mahdyar Aghajani (born 1989), Iranian musician, record producer, and film composer
- Saeed Aghajani, Iranian footballer

== See also ==
- Aghajani Kashmeri (1908–1998), Indian screenwriter, actor, and poet
