= IPETCA =

Economic agreement

Indigenous Peoples Economic and Trade Cooperation Arrangement
- Membership: New Zealand; Canada; Australia; Taiwan

Establishment
  - Ottawa: 1 July 2022

IPETCA, officially the Indigenous Peoples Economic and Trade Cooperation Arrangement, is a non-binding economic arrangement for promoting the economic empowerment of indigenous peoples in the Asia Pacific region, established in 2021.

== History ==
=== Founding ===
New Zealand and other APEC economies begin to develop IPETCA since February 2021. The New Zealand foreign affairs minister, Nanaia Mahuta, later announced the IPETCA in December 2021 and Canada joined the IPETCA in the same month. Australia and Taiwan later joined IPETCA in 2021 and 2022 respectively and became part of the founding members of the IPETCA.

The IPETCA has a focus on addressing indigenous trade issues, raising awareness of Indigenous economies within the Asia-Pacific Economic Cooperation (APEC), and increasing economic cooperation between indigenous peoples. Activities under IPETCA is to be facilitated by the IPETCA Partnership Council.
