= Tainui (New Zealand electorate) =

Tainui was a New Zealand parliamentary Māori electorate that existed between 2002 and 2008. It replaced the Hauraki electorate and absorbed a significant part of northern Te Tai Hauāuru. From the 2008 election it was replaced by the Hauraki-Waikato electorate.

The seat was held by Nanaia Mahuta of the Labour Party for the entirety of its existence from 2002 to 2008.

== History ==
The Tainui electorate was replaced by the Hauraki-Waikato electorate in 2008.

=== Members of Parliament ===
Key

Labour

Election	Winner
2002 election	Nanaia Mahuta
2005 election	Nanaia Mahuta

No candidates that contested the Tainui electorate were returned as list MPs.

== Election results ==
=== 2005 election ===
2005 general election: Tainui
Notes:	Blue background denotes the winner of the electorate vote. Pink background denotes a candidate elected from their party list. Yellow background denotes an electorate win by a list member, or other incumbent. A ✓ or ✗ denotes status of any incumbent, win or lose respectively.						
Party	Candidate	Votes	%	±%	Party votes	%	±%
Labour	✓ Nanaia Mahuta	9,469	50.88	+3.35	10,421	54.68	+1.92
Māori Party	Angeline Greensill	7,609	40.88		5,184	27.20	
Destiny	Hayden Solomon	589	3.16		294	1.54	
Independent	Andrew Pope	308	1.65				
NZ First					1,161	6.09	−8.33
National					774	4.06	+0.23
Green					518	2.72	−7.20
Legalise Cannabis					144	0.76	−2.16
United Future					73	0.38	−1.92
Progressive					53	0.28	−0.82
ACT					49	0.26	−0.81
Christian Heritage					11	0.06	−0.94
Family Rights					9	0.05	
Alliance					6	0.03	−3.34
99 MP					5	0.03	
Democrats					5	0.03	
RONZ					4	0.02	
Direct Democracy					2	0.01	
One NZ					2	0.01	
Libertarianz					1	0.01	
Informal votes		637			343		
Total valid votes		18,612			19,059		
Labour hold	Majority	1,860	9.99	−12.97			

=== 2002 election ===
2002 general election: Tainui
Notes:	Blue background denotes the winner of the electorate vote. Pink background denotes a candidate elected from their party list. Yellow background denotes an electorate win by a list member, or other incumbent. A ✓ or ✗ denotes status of any incumbent, win or lose respectively.						
Party	Candidate	Votes	%	±%	Party votes	%	±%
Labour	Nanaia Mahuta	7,098	47.52		8,007	52.75	
Alliance	Willie Jackson	3,668	24.56		511	3.37	
Mana Māori	Angeline Greensill	1,839	12.31		811	5.34	
National	Kevin Davis	639	4.28		582	3.83	
United Future	Lee Edmonds	460	3.08		350	2.31	
Progressive	Te Pare Joseph	396	2.65		167	1.10	
Christian Heritage	Albert Vahaakolo	289	1.93		151	0.99	
MAI	Mikaire Tuheke Sutton	115	0.77				
NZ First					2,189	14.42	
Green					1,506	9.92	
Legalise Cannabis					442	2.91	
ACT					162	1.07	
ORNZ					104	0.69	
One NZ					10	0.07	
NMP					4	0.03	
Informal votes		432			182		
Total valid votes		14,936			15,178		
Labour win new seat	Majority	3,430	22.96				
