= Dawn McMillan =

New Zealand children's author

Dawn McMillan MNZM
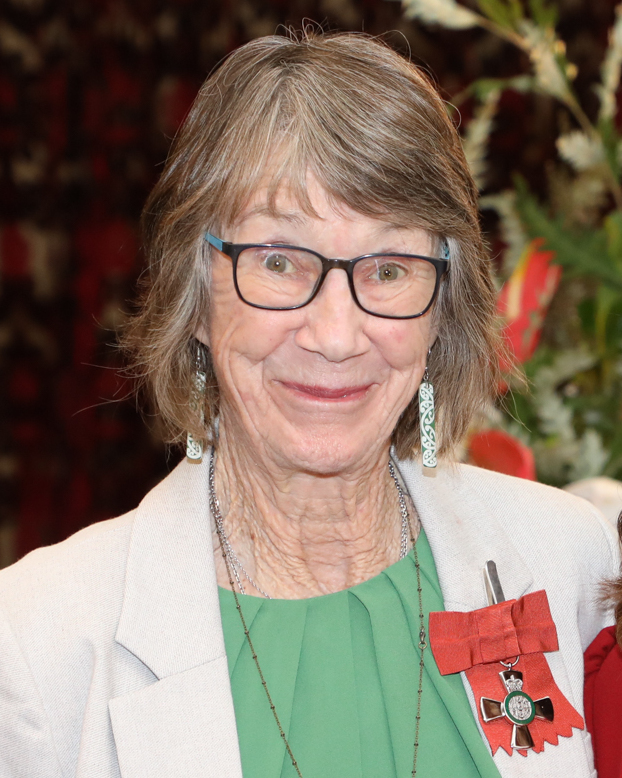
- McMillan in 2026
- Born: New Zealand
- Genre: Children's picture books
- Notable works: I Need a New Bum!
- Notable awards: Storylines Notable Book Awards (2003, 2013, 2017); Children's Choice Award (2003); Booksellers New Zealand Gold Medal

Dawn Mary McMillan MNZM is a New Zealand children's writer, focusing mainly on picture books and educational material. In December 2025, McMillan was appointed a Member of the New Zealand Order of Merit, for services to children's literature.

== Career ==
McMillan worked as a primary school teacher, before beginning to write for children in the late 1990s. She has written more than forty picture books and over 200 educational works, with her first work, Sea Secrets, published in 1998. Her books have been sold internationally, including in the United States, Australia, the United Kingdom and Canada.

Jason, the lead character in Jason and the Blind Puppy and Missing! (both published 2004), wears hearing aids and uses sign language.

In 2012 McMillan published I Need a New Bum!, illustrated by Ross Kinnaird, about a boy who is anxious about the crack in his bottom. The book has been translated into seven languages, becoming an international bestseller, and was the first in a series of bum-focused books. In 2018, a video of the Australian-based The Scottish Granny reading the book to her grandchild went viral. For the book's tenth anniversary, a bilingual English–Māori version was published, titled Kia Hou Taku Tou. In 2022, a teacher in Byram, Mississippi was fired for reading the book (published as I Need a New Butt! in the US) to his second-grade class. However, in late January 2026 his dismissal was reversed by an appeals court.

McMillan is married and lives in Waiomu, on the Coromandel Peninsula.

== Honours and awards ==
Picture book Why Do Dogs Sniff Bottoms?, co-authored with Bert Signal, won a Storylines Notable Book Award in 2003. The book also won the Children's Choice Award in the 2003 New Zealand Book Awards for Children and Young Adults.

McMillan also won Storylines Notable Book Awards in 2013, for Colour the Stars, and 2017, for The Harmonica.

In the 2026 New Year Honours, McMillan was appointed a Member of the New Zealand Order of Merit, for services to children's literature.

McMillan has been awarded a Booksellers New Zealand Gold Medal.

== Selected works ==
- Sea Secrets (1998)
- Why Do Dogs Sniff Bottoms? (2003)
- Colour the Stars (2013)
- The Harmonica (2017)

=== The New Bum Series ===
- I Need a New Bum! (2012), illustrated by Ross Kinnaird, published as I Need a New Butt! in the US in 2014 by Dover
- I've Broken My Bum!
- My Bum is SO NOISY!
- My Bum is SO CHEEKY!
- My Bum’s ON THE RUN!
