= Nanaia Mahuta =

New Zealand politician (born 1970)

The Honourable Nanaia Mahuta
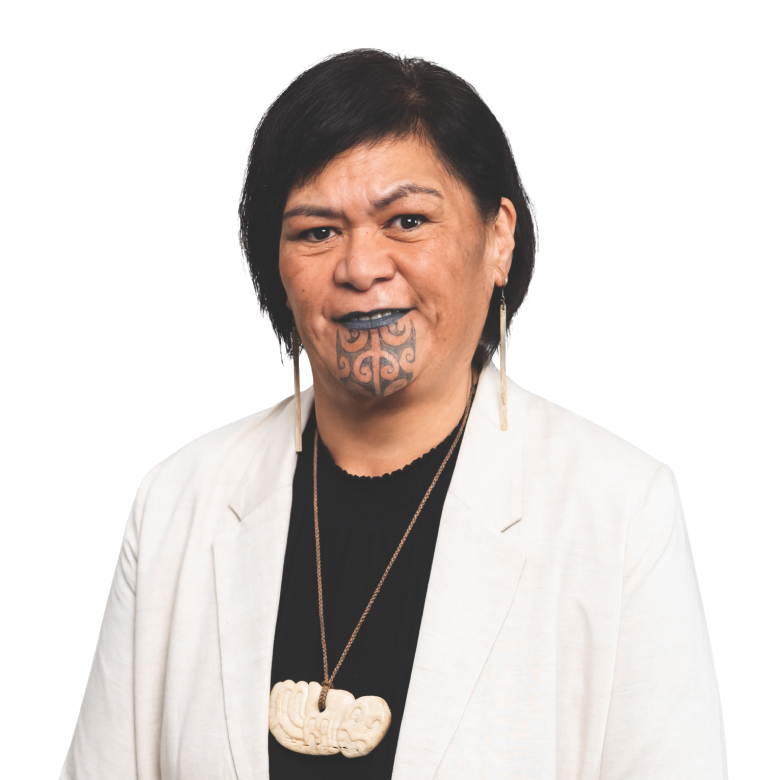
- Mahuta in 2023

28th Minister of Foreign Affairs
- In office 6 November 2020 – 11 November 2023
- Prime Minister: Jacinda Ardern; Chris Hipkins
- Preceded by: Winston Peters
- Succeeded by: Grant Robertson

11th Minister of Disarmament and Arms Control
- In office 1 February 2023 – 11 November 2023
- Prime Minister: Chris Hipkins
- Preceded by: Phil Twyford
- Succeeded by: Grant Robertson

12th Minister of Local Government
- In office 26 October 2017 – 1 February 2023
- Prime Minister: Jacinda Ardern; Chris Hipkins
- Preceded by: Anne Tolley
- Succeeded by: Kieran McAnulty
- In office 5 November 2007 – 19 November 2008
- Prime Minister: Helen Clark
- Preceded by: Mark Burton
- Succeeded by: Rodney Hide

44th Minister for Māori Development
- In office 26 October 2017 – 6 November 2020
- Prime Minister: Jacinda Ardern
- Preceded by: Te Ururoa Flavell
- Succeeded by: Willie Jackson

Member of the New Zealand Parliament for Hauraki-Waikato
- In office 8 November 2008 – 14 October 2023
- Preceded by: New constituency
- Succeeded by: Hana-Rawhiti Maipi-Clarke

Member of the New Zealand Parliament for Tainui
- In office 27 July 2002 – 8 November 2008
- Preceded by: New constituency
- Succeeded by: Constituency abolished
- Majority: 3,430

Member of the New Zealand Parliament for Te Tai Hauāuru
- In office 27 November 1999 – 27 July 2002
- Preceded by: Tuku Morgan
- Succeeded by: Tariana Turia
- Majority: 6,233

Member of the New Zealand Parliament for Labour party list
- In office 12 October 1996 – 27 November 1999

Personal details
- Born: 21 August 1970 (age 56) Auckland, New Zealand
- Party: Labour
- Spouse: William Gannin Ormsby
- Relations: Tipa Mahuta (sister); Korokī Mahuta (grandfather); Te Atairangikaahu (aunt)
- Children: 3
- Parent: Robert Mahuta (father)
- Occupation: Politician; anthropologist; diplomat

Nanaia Cybele Mahuta (born 21 August 1970) is a New Zealand former politician who served as the minister of foreign affairs from 2020 to 2023. A member of the New Zealand Labour Party, Mahuta served as the member of Parliament (MP) for 27 years, at first for the party list and then for three different Māori electorates, latterly for Hauraki-Waikato. Mahuta served as Minister of Foreign Affairs from 6 November 2020 to 11 November 2023. She received international recognition as the first woman (and first Māori woman) to hold the Foreign Affairs portfolio. In October 2022, Mahuta became the Mother of the House, having served continuously in the House of Representatives since the 1996 general election. She lost her seat in parliament in the 2023 general election to Te Pāti Māori candidate Hana-Rawhiti Maipi-Clarke, who was subsequently Baby of the House.

Mahuta was born into the kāhui ariki in Auckland, the daughter of Sir Robert Mahuta, who was the adopted son of Māori king Korokī. Affiliated to Ngāti Mahuta, her father was the elder brother of the Māori queen Te Atairangikaahu, and she is a first cousin of former Māori monarch Kiingi Tūheitia. Elected to Parliament at the age of 26, Mahuta has had a long and influential career in the Labour Party. She was also Minister of Local Government, Minister of Youth Development and Minister of Customs in the Fifth Labour Government and Minister of Local Government and Minister for Māori Development in the Sixth Labour Government.

Mahuta took a generally progressive platform as Minister of Foreign Affairs. She called on the Israeli government to stop evictions of Palestinian families from their homes in East Jerusalem. Mahuta introduced the Russia Sanctions Act 2022, which after unanimous approval imposed various sanctions targeting Russian elites and assets deemed to be complicit in the Russian invasion of Ukraine. As part of New Zealand's membership of the Five Eyes alliance, she condemned the disqualification of pro-democracy Hong Kong legislators as a breach of Hong Kong's autonomy and rights under the Sino-British Joint Declaration. She was the first female MP to wear a moko kauae (a traditional Māori facial tattoo), which was widely praised as a powerful symbol of Indigenous women. In 2018, she was listed as one of the BBC's 100 Women. Domestically, she was a proponent of the Three Waters reform programme and co-governance.

== Early life and family ==
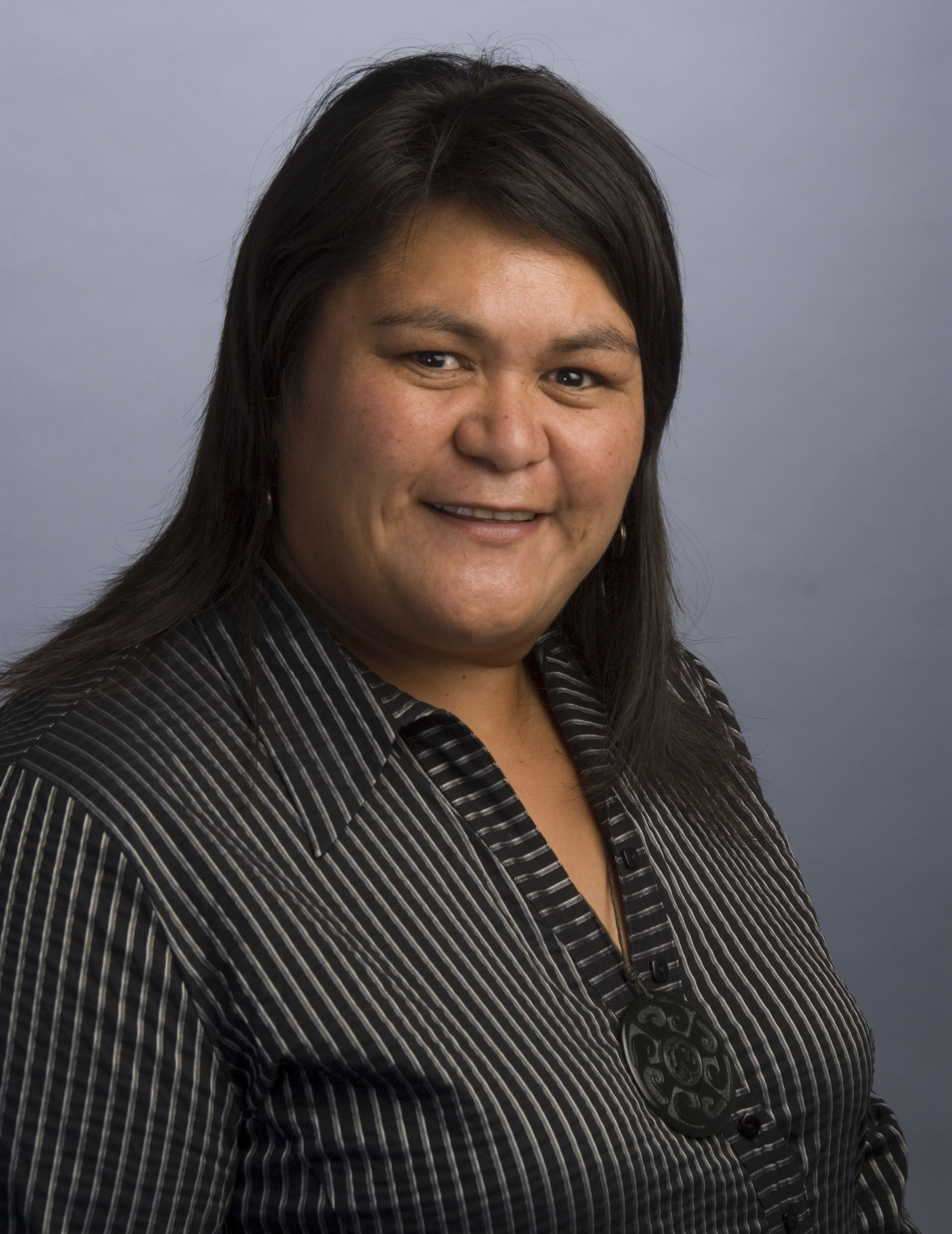
Mahuta in 2008 without moko

Mahuta was born in Auckland in 1970 to Eliza Raiha Edmonds, and (later Sir) Robert Mahuta. Some of her early life was spent in Oxford, where her father was undertaking PhD study.

She was educated at Kura Kaupapa Rakaumanga school in Huntly and later at Waikato Diocesan School for Girls as a boarder. She studied law at the University of Waikato, but failed three of her seven papers and had to drop out. She then studied social anthropology and Māori business development at the University of Auckland, graduating with an MA (Hons). The title of her 1995 master's thesis was Te poukai o Waahi : an historical background to the Waahi poukai. She also worked at the university as a researcher/archivist.

She has strong links to the Māori King movement. Her father was the adopted son of King Korokī and the elder brother of Māori Queen Te Atairangikaahu. She is related to the current Māori queen, Nga wai hono i te po. Mahuta's sister, Tipa Mahuta, is a long-serving Waikato regional councillor and the co-chair of the Māori Health Authority.

Mahuta is married to William Gannin Ormsby, her first cousin. The couple have had three children together (the first died shortly after birth), plus four children from Ormsby's previous relationship.

In 2016, she acquired a Māori facial tattoo (moko kauae) and became the first female MP to wear one in the New Zealand parliament. Other Māori women in parliament—Metiria Turei of the Green Party and Marama Fox of the Māori Party—spoke of their support.

== Political career ==
New Zealand Parliament
Years	Term	Electorate	List	Party
1996–1999	45th	List	8	Labour
1999–2002	46th	Te Tai Hauāuru	10	Labour
2002–2005	47th	Tainui	19	Labour
2005–2008	48th	Tainui	none	Labour
2008–2011	49th	Hauraki-Waikato	10	Labour
2011–2014	50th	Hauraki-Waikato	12	Labour
2014–2017	51st	Hauraki-Waikato	6	Labour
2017–2020	52nd	Hauraki-Waikato	none	Labour
2020–2023	53rd	Hauraki-Waikato	10	Labour

Mahuta joined the Labour Party at the request of retiring Western Maori MP Koro Wētere and after hearing Helen Clark speak in Auckland. She was also encouraged to participate in politics by members of the Māori Women's Welfare League.

She contested Te Tai Hauāuru (the replacement seat for Western Maori) in the 1996 elections but lost to New Zealand First's Tuku Morgan. However, with a list ranking of 8, Mahuta was elected as one of the first New Zealand list MPs. Mahuta was aged 26 years and 52 days when she was elected (twelve days younger than Deborah Morris) and was the youngest member of the New Zealand House of Representatives until the election of Darren Hughes in 2002.

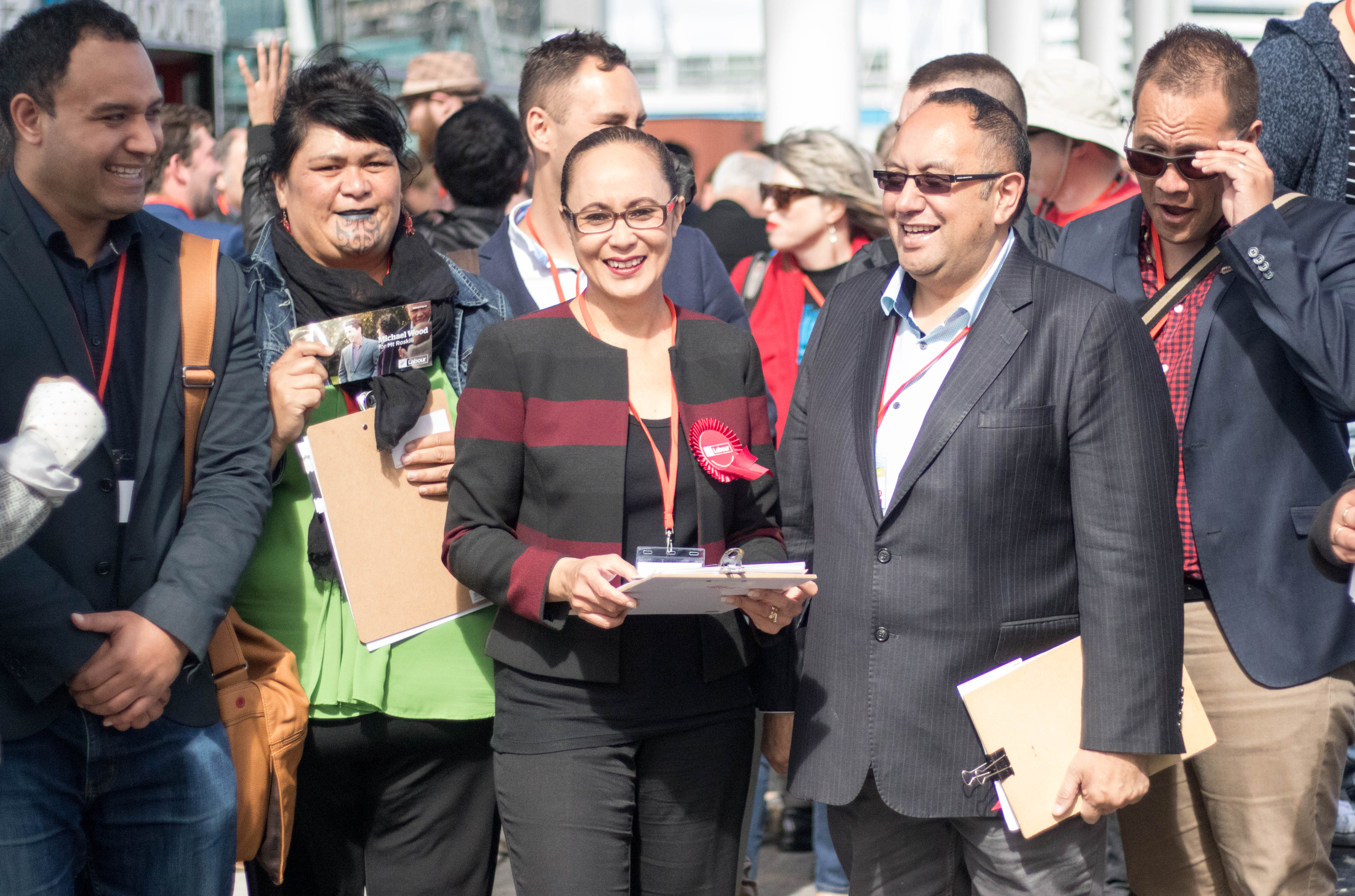
Mahuta campaigning with Labour MPs on behalf of Michael Wood for the 2016 Mount Roskill by-election

After completing her first term as a list MP, Mahuta contested Te Tai Hauauru in the 1999 election, and won. She transferred to and won the new Tainui electorate for the 2002 election and held it in 2005. That seat was renamed Hauraki-Waikato ahead of the 2008 general election. She retained that seat until 2023. In October 2022, Mahuta became the Mother of the House, being the longest continuously serving female MP (alongside Father of the House Gerry Brownlee).

Mahuta has been placed in high positions on the Labour list in each election she has contested where she has had a list position. However, she opted not to seek a list position in 2005 following the foreshore and seabed controversy and again in 2017 as part of Labour's Māori electorate strategy.

On 8 December 2022, Mahuta confirmed that she would be contesting the 2023 general election in order "to ensure that the changes that we've [the Labour Government] been putting through can continue to progress".

=== Foreshore and seabed controversy ===
In 2004, she joined Tariana Turia, another Labour MP, in voting against the first reading of her party's legislation on the controversial foreshore and seabed issue. She did not, however, join Turia when she quit Labour to found the Māori Party. In the bill's second reading, she again voted against her party, but in the third reading, she changed her position and supported it, saying that it was the politically pragmatic thing to do. In her third reading speech, Mahuta stated that she would withdraw from the Labour Party list at the next election to seek a renewed mandate from her electorate.

=== Select committee memberships and party portfolios ===
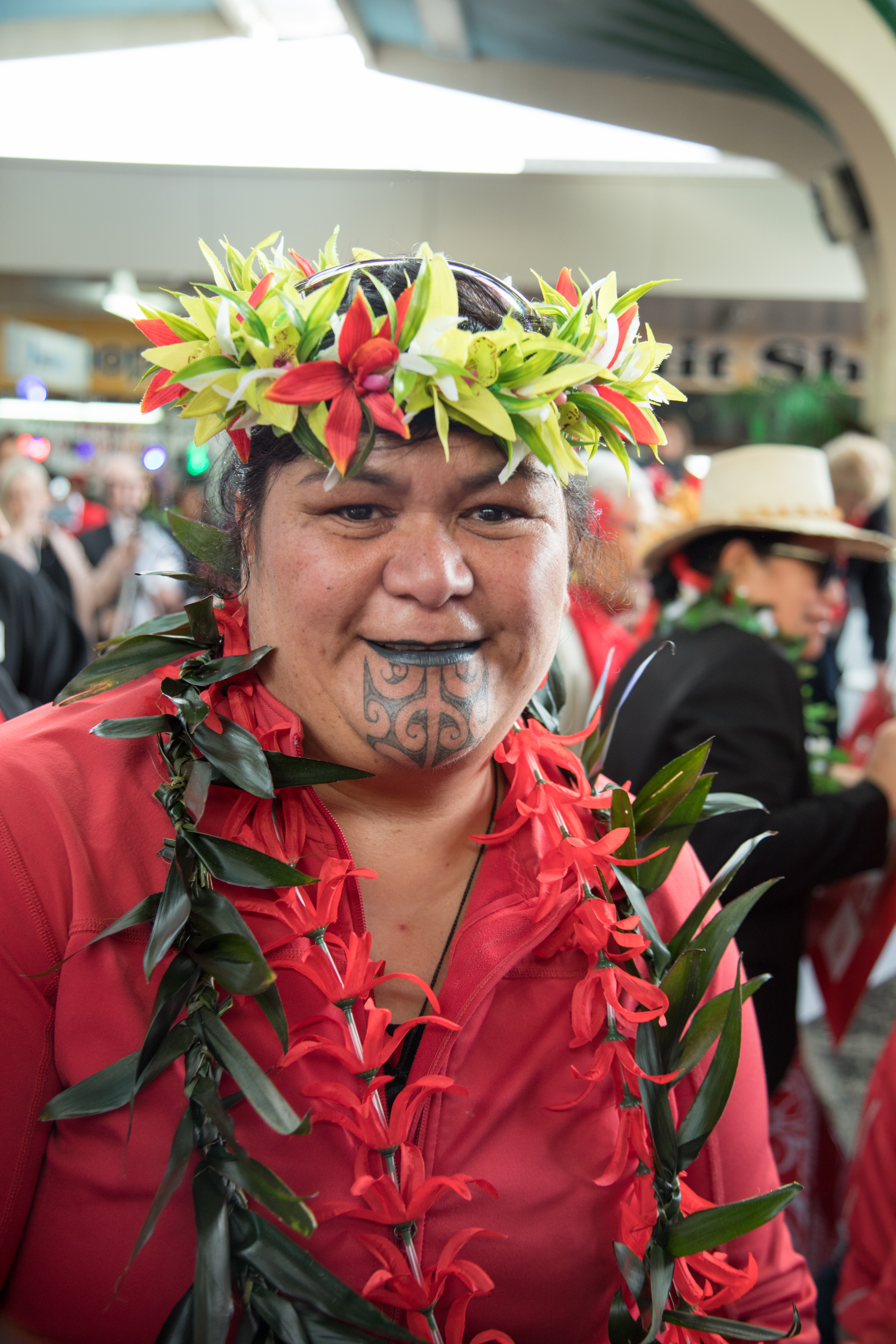
Mahuta in August 2017

As a first-term opposition MP, Mahuta was appointed as a member of the regulations review committee and the electoral law committee. She was also the Labour party spokesperson for Māori education. From 1999 to 2005, the first two terms of the Fifth Labour Government, Mahuta was variously a member of the justice and electoral, Māori affairs, education and science, local government and environment committees, and was chair of the Māori affairs committee from August 2004 to August 2005.

Following the defeat of the Labour government in the 2008 election, and Labour's successive losses in 2011 and 2014, Mahuta held various appointments as Labour Party spokesperson for Māori affairs, education, energy and conservation. She was also deputy chairperson of the Māori Affairs select committee in the 51st Parliament.

Mahuta has had three member's bills selected for introduction. Her Resource Management (Enhancement of Iwi Management Plans) Amendment Bill, which proposed giving more weight to Māori in resource-management decisions, was drawn from the members' ballot in 2009. The bill was defeated at its first reading in August. Her Charter Schools (Application of Official Information and Ombudsmen Acts) Bill was drawn and defeated in 2016.

In July 2017, Mahuta's Sentencing (Domestic Violence) Amendment Bill was drawn. The Bill was previously in the name of Sue Moroney and would have allowed judges to consider history of domestic violence when making decisions about sentencing in court. It was withdrawn when the Labour Party formed a new government in October 2017 in favour of broader family violence reforms that were completed in 2018.

=== Labour leadership election, 2014 ===
Labour lost the 2014 general election with its worst result since 1922; as a result, David Cunliffe resigned as leader, triggering a leadership election. Mahuta had been a supporter of Cunliffe and sought election as his deputy in his unsuccessful 2011 leadership bid. Mahuta was one of four MPs who sought election as Cunliffe's successor. She announced her candidacy half an hour before nominations closed on 14 October 2014 and was nominated by Louisa Wall and William Sio. Mahuta placed fourth in the election. She considered retiring from politics at the 2017 general election after Maori King Tūheitia Paki changed his allegiance to the Māori Party. However, Mahuta eventually decided to stay on. She was not placed on the Labour Party list at that election in line with Labour's decision for its incumbent Māori electorate MPs to contest the electorate vote only.

== Minister in the Fifth Labour Government ==
Mahuta was appointed a minister in the final term of the Fifth Labour Government. In her contribution to a collection of essays by Māori political leaders, she recalled requesting portfolios other than Māori affairs. She was appointed Minister of Customs, Minister of Youth Affairs, Associate Minister of Local Government and Associate Minister for the Environment in October 2005. She gained the full local government portfolio and also became Associate Minister of Tourism in November 2007.

Mahuta lost her portfolios when Labour was defeated in the 2008 general election.

== Minister in the Sixth Labour Government ==
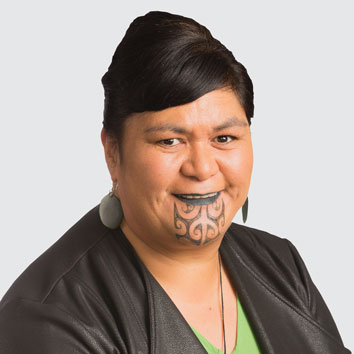
Official portrait, 2020

Mahuta served as a cabinet minister in the Sixth Labour Government. In the government's first term, from 2017 to 2020, she held the portfolios for Local Government and Maori Development and also served as associate minister for the trade and export growth, the environment and housing portfolios.

In the government's second term, beginning in 2020, she was appointed Minister of Foreign Affairs, Minister of Local Government and Associate Minister for Māori Development. In a 2023 reshuffle she dropped the local government portfolio and additionally became Minister of Disarmament and Arms Control. Prime Minister Chris Hipkins stated that the change was intended to allow Mahuta to focus on her foreign affairs portfolio and to travel overseas. He also denied that it was motivated by the response to the controversial Three Waters reform programme and confirmed that the Government would continue with the programme.

=== Māori Development ===
As Minister for Māori Development, in September 2019, Mahuta delivered a tearful and emotional speech as Parliament officially apologised for a police raid in 1916 on Māori leader Rua Kenana's Iharaira faith's compound in Maungapohatu in the North Island's Bay of Plenty Region.

=== Local Government ===
==== Tauranga City Council ====
On 4 December 2020, Mahuta, in her role as Minister of Local Government, informed the Tauranga City Council of her intention to appoint commissioners following infighting within the city council that had led to the resignation of the Mayor of Tauranga Tenby Powell on 19 November. Local Government New Zealand supported the move to appoint commissioners in order to get the city's governance "back on track." On 18 December, Mahuta confirmed that the Government would be appointing commissioners to administer Tauranga since the City Council did not provide "sufficient evidence" about how it was addressing the city's governance issues. However, a review by law firm Russell McVeagh found Mahuta's decision may have been "unlawful" because she failed to adequately consider lesser alternatives, such as the appointment of a crown manager. Then local Tauranga MP, Simon Bridges called the appointment of commissioners "dramatic and draconian."

The commissioners' terms began in early 2021 and were scheduled to run until the 2022 New Zealand local elections in October 2022.

In mid–March 2022, Mahuta confirmed that Tauranga would continue to be run by four commissioners until July 2024, citing the substantial infrastructure challenges in the city and the surrounding Bay of Plenty Region. However, a legal review by Linda Clark from Dentons Kensington Swan argued that relying on infrastructure challenges as a reason to postpone elections "sets the bar very low and would apply to a wide range of local authorities on an indefinite basis." Clark argued that Mahuta's decision was both unlawful and unreasonable; not meeting the statutory test for crown intervention under the Local Government Act 2002.

Local Government New Zealand president Stuart Crosby labelled the extension of the commission's appointment "disgusting" while then Tauranga MP, Simon Bridges, cited “power, convenience and control” as the reasons behind Mahuta's decision, and questioned a lack of achievement since the four-person commission was put in place by Labour in February 2021. Victoria University of Wellington public law expert, Dean Knight, said democracy had taken a hit and "should have been restored forthwith."

On 22 April 2022, Mahuta reappointed the Tauranga Commission's chairwoman Anne Tolley and fellow commissioners Bill Wasley, Stephen Selwood, and Shadrach Rolleston; with elected councillors expected to return in July 2024.

==== Māori wards and constituencies ====
On 1 February 2021, Mahuta announced that the Government would pass legislation upholding local councils' decisions to establish Māori wards and constituencies. This new law would also abolish an existing law allowing local referendums to veto decisions by councils to establish Māori wards. This law is intended to come into effect before the scheduled 2022 local body elections.

On 25 February, Mahuta's Local Electoral (Māori Wards and Māori Constituencies) Amendment Act 2021 passed its third reading in Parliament. This Bill eliminates mechanisms for holding public referendums on the establishment of Māori wards and constituencies on local bodies. Mahuta's Bill was supported by the Labour, Green and Māori parties but opposed by the opposition National and ACT parties. National unsuccessfully attempted to delay the bill by mounting a twelve hour filibuster challenging all of the Bill's ten clauses.

==== Three Waters reform programme ====
As Minister of Local Government, Mahuta has played an important role in promoting and implementing the Government's contentious Three Waters reform programme, which proposes taking control of water utility services away from local councils and centralising them in four new entities. Mahuta has argued that the Three Water reforms will give Māori a greater say in the administration of water resources, stating the status of water as Taonga in Māori culture. In early October 2021, five Christchurch City councillors demanded that she resign her local government portfolio over the Three Waters reforms. Mahuta rejected their demand, accusing the councillors of "political campaigning."

On 27 October, Mahuta formally launched the Three Waters reforms, which attracted criticism from several local leaders including Mayor of Auckland Phil Goff, Mayor of Christchurch Lianne Dalziel, Mayor of Wellington Andy Foster, and the opposition National and ACT parties. In response to criticism, Mahuta acknowledged that the Three Waters reforms policy was not popular but accused opponents of spreading misinformation. In March 2022, Mahuta acknowledged underestimating the level of public opposition to the Three Waters reforms and problems with the associated promotional advertising campaign.

Mahuta introduced the Water Services Entities Bill in early June 2022. As part of the Three Waters reform programme, this proposed bill would establish the four regional water services entities that would take over management of water infrastructure from local councils. Under the proposed law, councils would retain ownership of their water assets through a "community share" arrangement but the new water service entities would retain effective control over these assets. Mahuta also confirmed that further legislation would also be introduced to facilitate the transfer of assets and liabilities from local authorities to the new water services entities, integrate entities into other regulatory systems, and to ensure economic regulation and consumer protection over the new entities. The National Party, ACT Party, and Communities 4 Local Democracy leader and Manawatū District Mayor Helen Worboy opposed the Water Services Entities Bill, claiming that it would transfer control of water assets from local communities into a new centralised bureaucracy.

In early December 2022, Mahuta supported a controversial Green Party entrenchment clause in the Water Services Entities Bill proposing that any future law change on the ownership of public water assets would require 60% parliamentary support or a referendum. Within New Zealand law, entrenchment clauses have traditionally been reserved for constitutional matters in the Electoral Act 1993 such as the voting age. Mahuta's position went against the Labour Cabinet's position opposing the entrenchment clause. In response, the opposition National Party leader Christopher Luxon called for Mahuta to be sacked from Cabinet for allegedly defying Cabinet's decision not to adopt the entrenchment clause.

Shadow Leader of the House Chris Bishop accused Mahuta of failing to consult Justice Minister Kiri Allan on proposals relating to constitutional arrangements. Prime Minister Ardern defended Mahuta and accused Luxon of misrepresenting Mahuta's actions while reaffirming Labour's opposition to privatising water assets. The Water Services Entities Bill passed its third reading on 7 December with the sole support of the Labour Party. During the final reading, Mahuta argued that the legislation would help address water contamination and quality issues, citing the 2016 Havelock North campylobacter contamination incident and a recent "boil water" notice in the Matamata-Piako District.

==== Local government review ====
On 23 April 2021, Mahuta announced a review into the future of local government in the country. Following the release of the independent draft report on 28 October 2022, she said that the New Zealand government was "focused on ways to keep a lid on rate rises...[and would]...continue to support the sector in its efforts to engage with local communities in order to get the buy-in needed for any change." The draft document acknowledged that the "pace of change" risked growing distrust of, and engagement with, democratic institutions and signalled five shift that needed to be made to address this: "strengthened local democracy; authentic relationships with hapū/iwi and Māori; a focus on wellbeing; genuine partnership between central and local government; and more equitable funding." The final report was released in July 2023. In response to a recommendation that the "67 city and district councils and 11 regional councils be reorganised into 15 regional groupings," Mayor of Carterton Ron Mark said that "every council in the country is vulnerable" to amalgamation and expressed concern that the Wairarapa area could lose some of its asset base and autonomy if things move "to a more centralised socialist viewpoint, disempowering our people."

=== Environment and Housing portfolios: alleged conflicts of interest ===
In late May 2022, The New Zealand Herald reported that the Ministry for the Environment had awarded Mahuta's husband William Gannin Ormsby and several family members contracts worth above NZ$90,000, commencing late October 2020. Ormbsy owned a waste management consultancy service called Ka Awatea Services. In addition, the social housing provider Kāinga Ora paid Ormbsy's company NZ$73,000 for organising hui (social gatherings) and workshops. At the time, Mahuta held the portfolio of Associate Minister of Housing. The opposition National Party accused Mahuta of unfairly awarding contracts to relatives. On 21 June 2022, Prime Minister Jacinda Ardern defended Mahuta, claiming that she had abided by Cabinet policies and protocol.

In response to a parliamentary question submitted by National MP Simeon Brown, Environment Minister David Parker confirmed that the Ministry of Environment was investigating the process through which William Ormsby, his nephew Tamoko Ormsby and wife Waimirirangi Ormsby were appointed to a five-member advisory working group researching the application of indigenous Māori knowledge to waste management practices. The Ministry claimed that the Ormsbys had been selected for their role because of their expertise and that cabinet ministers were not involved in the selection process. The Ministry also emphasised that the Mahuta family connection had been disclosed from the beginning and that it had sought external advice on the appointments.

On 21 September 2022, the Public Service Commissioner Peter Hughes launched an investigation into four contracts that Ormsby's Ka Awatea Services had made with four government departments: Kāinga Ora, the Ministry for the Environment, the Department of Conservation and Te Puni Kōkiri (the Ministry for Māori Development). Hughes had commenced the investigation at the request of both National MP Simeon Brown and Mahuta herself. Mahuta emphasised that she had declared any potential conflicts of interest, abided by the Cabinet manual and supported the Public Service Commissioner's investigation.

On 13 November 2022, the Public Service Commission released its report into Ka Wa Atea's government contracts. The report found that Te Puni Kōkiri, the Environment Ministry, and Kāinga Ora failed to manage conflicts of interests by following their own policies and processes while the Department of Conservation had poor contract management practices. However, the Commission's report concluded that it found "no evidence of favouritism, bias, or undue influence over agency decisions" in relation to Ka Awatea Services. In response, Mahuta welcomed the report as a vindication of her assertion that she had no role in approving these contracts. In addition, National MP Brown stated that the Commission's report exposed a "culture of carelessness" in how the public service procured services and managed conflicts of interest.

=== Foreign Affairs ===
==== 2020 ====
Mahuta was announced as the next Minister of Foreign Affairs on 2 November 2020. She received international recognition as the first woman (and first Māori woman) to hold the Foreign Affairs portfolio. In addition, she retained her portfolio of Minister for Local Government while becoming Associate Minister of Māori Development.

On 3 November, former Prime Minister Helen Clark and the Māori Council criticised the international media's description of Mahuta as a "tattooed Māori woman" for focusing on her physical appearance and race. On 4 November, right-wing blogger and author Olivia Pierson drew criticism and media coverage for posting a tweet stating that "Facial tattoos, especially on a female diplomat, is the height of ugly, uncivilised wokedom." In response, Race Relations Commissioner Meng Foon criticised Pierson's actions and said that "Mahuta's kauae moko was special to Māori and should be celebrated." Mahuta declined to comment on the issue. Following criticism of Pierson's post on social media, online retailer Mighty Ape delisted Pierson's book Western Values Defended: A Primer. Pierson described the delisting of her book as "cancel culture" and claimed she had received death threats.

On 18 November, Mahuta joined her Australian, Canadian, British and American counterparts in condemning the disqualification of pro-democracy Hong Kong legislators as a breach of Hong Kong's autonomy and rights under the Sino-British Joint Declaration. In response, the Chinese Foreign Ministry's spokesperson Zhao Lijian warned the Five Eyes countries, stating that "No matter if they have five eyes or 10 eyes, if they dare to harm China's sovereignty, security and development interests, they should beware of their eyes being poked and blinded." In response, Mahuta defended New Zealand's commitment to free speech, free media, and democracy.

In mid-December, Mahuta stated during an interview with Reuters that New Zealand would be interested in helping to negotiate a truce between Australia and China, whose bilateral relationship had deteriorated due to Australia legislation on foreign investment and interference, Australian support for an international investigation into the origins of the COVID-19 pandemic, Chinese blocks on Australian imports and a controversial Chinese post about alleged Australian war crimes in Afghanistan. In response, Global Times columnist Qian Feng claimed that New Zealand was not suited for the role of mediator since it was part of the same Western camp as Australia.

==== 2021 ====
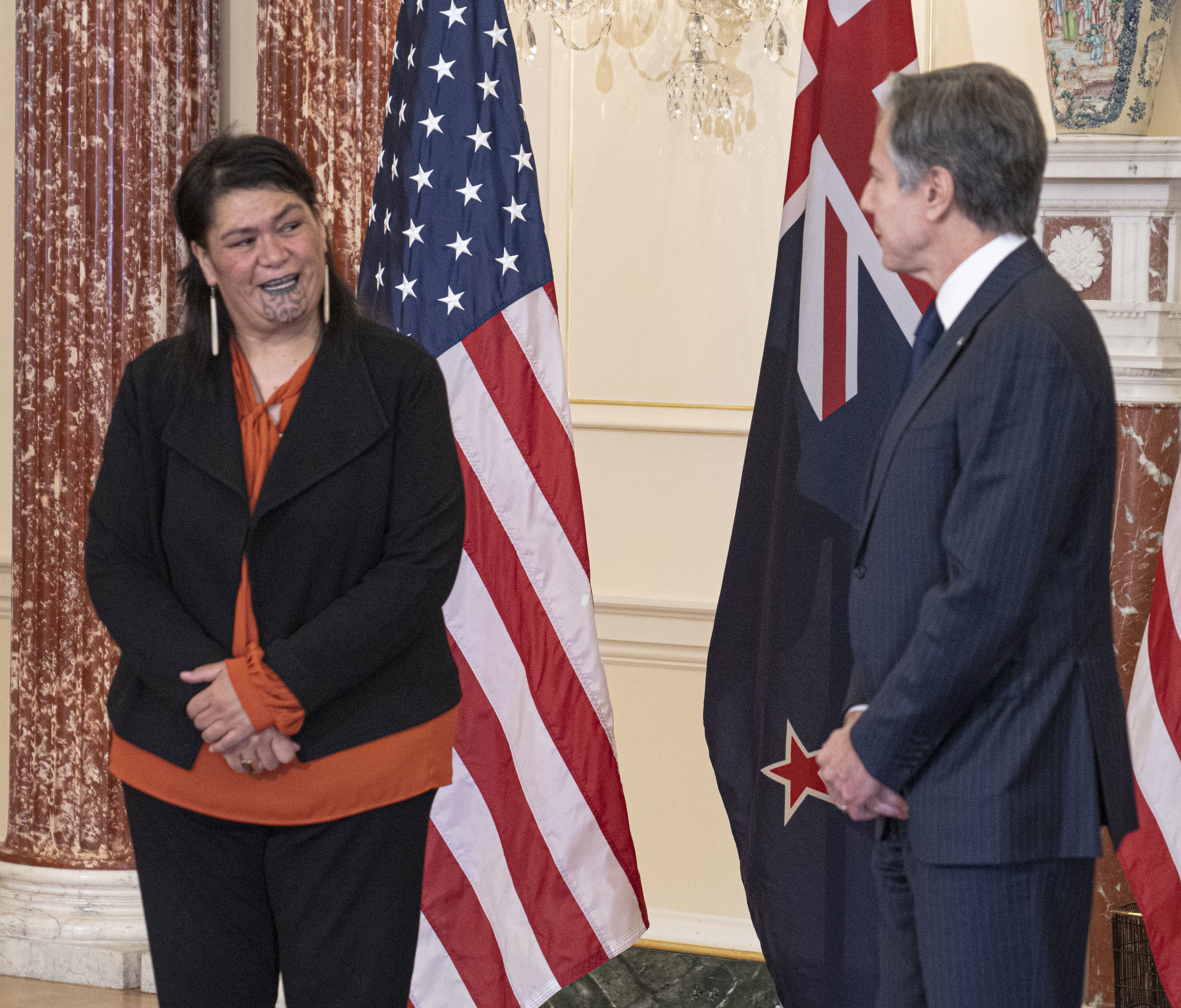
Mahuta meets with US Secretary of State Antony Blinken in 2021

On 9 February 2021, Mahuta announced that New Zealand had suspended high-level bilateral relations with Myanmar in response to the 2021 Myanmar coup d'état. The New Zealand Government joined other Western governments in refusing to recognise the new military-led government and called for the restoration of civilian-led rule. In addition, aid projects were diverted away from the Myanmar military and a travel ban was imposed on Myanmar's military leaders.

On 19 April, Mahuta stated that New Zealand would not let the United States-led Five Eyes dictate New Zealand's bilateral relationship with China and that New Zealand was uncomfortable with expanding the remit of the intelligence grouping. Mahuta's statements came amid rising disagreements between the New Zealand and Australian governments on how to manage relations with Beijing. In March 2021, the Australian and New Zealand governments issued a joint statement condemning the treatment of Uyghur minorities in Xinjiang. The Australian Government has since expressed concern about what it perceives as New Zealand Government efforts to undermine Five Eyes attempts to push back on what the Australian Government regards as "increasingly aggressive behaviour from Beijing."

In response to Mahuta's remarks, Prime Minister Ardern stated that New Zealand was still committed to the Five Eyes alliance but would not use the group as its first point for messaging on non-security matters. While British media criticised New Zealand for allegedly leaving the Five Eyes club, the Chinese Global Times praised New Zealand for putting its own national interests over the Five Eyes.

During a visit by Australian Foreign Minister Marise Payne on 22 April 2021, Mahuta discussed the issue of New Zealand deportees from Australia, the ISIL bride Suhayra Aden and the two government's differing approaches towards China.

On 11 May 2021, Mahuta called on Israel to stop evictions of Palestinian families from their homes in Israeli-occupied East Jerusalem and for "both sides to halt steps which undermine prospects for a two state solution".

Following the 2021 Hong Kong legislative election held on 19 December 2021, Foreign Minister Mahuta joined other Five Eyes foreign ministers issuing a joint statement criticising the exclusion of opposition candidates and urging China to respect human rights and freedoms in Hong Kong in accordance with the Sino-British Joint Declaration. In response, the Chinese Embassy in Wellington issued a statement claiming the election was "politically inclusive and fair" and urged the Five Eyes alliance to respect Chinese sovereignty over Hong Kong.

==== 2022 ====
In late January 2022, Mahuta reaffirmed the New Zealand Government's support for Ukraine in response to the Russian military build-up on the Russo-Ukrainian border and urged Russian to reduce tensions in accordance with international law. Following the 2022 Russian invasion of Ukraine in mid February 2022, Mahuta and Ardern joined New Zealand's Western allies in condemning Russian actions against Ukraine. As Foreign Minister, Mahuta introduced the Russia Sanctions Act 2022, which imposed various sanctions targeting Russian elites and assets deemed to be complicit in the Russian invasion of Ukraine. The bill passed into law on 9 March 2022 with unanimous support from all members of the New Zealand Parliament.

In mid-June 2022, Mahuta hosted Australian Foreign Minister Penny Wong during her first state visit to New Zealand. The two Foreign Ministers reaffirmed bilateral cooperation in the areas of climate change, indigenous, and Indo-Pacific issues. The opposition ACT Party's foreign affairs spokesperson Brooke Van Velden criticised Mahuta's few international trips during her tenure as Foreign Minister, suggesting that Mahuta was preoccupied with the Three Waters reform programme. By comparison, her Australian counterpart Wong had undertaken a "grand tour" of the Pacific Islands following the election of the Albanese government in late May 2022 to counter recent Chinese diplomatic engagement in the region including a bilateral security agreement with the Solomon Islands.

In early August 2022, Mahuta met with Chinese Foreign Minister Wang Yi at the East Asia and ASEAN summits in Cambodia. In addition to acknowledging 50 years of diplomatic relations between New Zealand and the People's Republic of China, she reiterated New Zealand's concerns about human rights in Xinjiang and Hong Kong, the 2021 Myanmar coup d'état, North Korean missile tests, Sino-Taiwanese tensions following United States Speaker of the House Nancy Pelosi's visit, and urged Beijing not to support Russia's invasion of Ukraine. Mahuta also accepted an invitation from Wang Yi to visit China.

==== 2023 ====
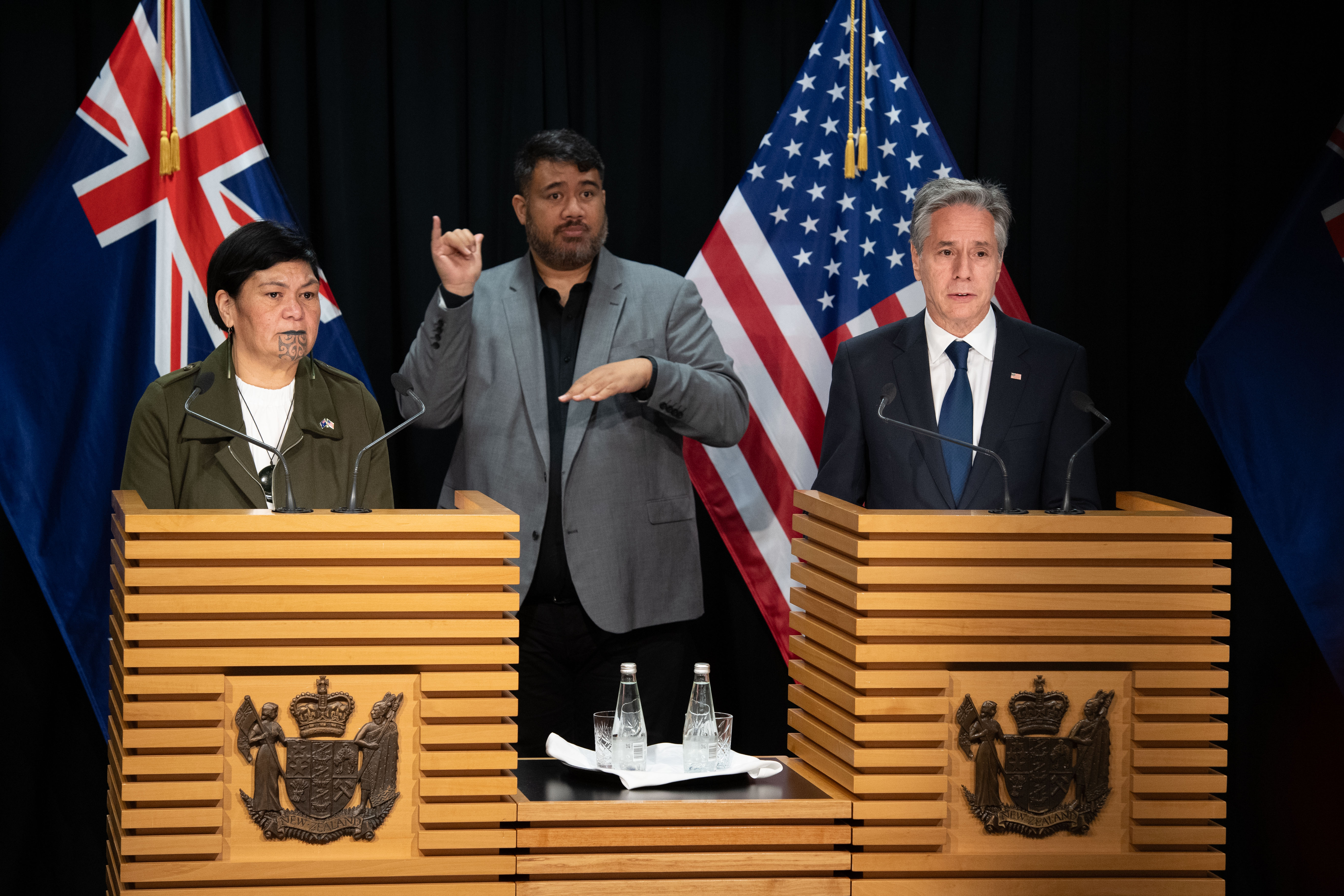
Mahuta and US Secretary of State Antony Blinken lead a press conference in the Beehive, Wellington, 27 July 2023

In response to the 2023 Turkey–Syria earthquake, Mahuta announced that New Zealand would be contributing NZ$1.5 million to assisting the International Red Cross and Red Crescent Movement's (IFRC) responses in Turkey and Syria. On 5 February 2023, Mahuta visited India and conducted bilateral talks with Indian Foreign Minister S. Jaishankar. The talks centred around taking the bilateral relationship to the next level, including exploring future economic relationship, cooperation in the International Solar Alliance, improved air connectivity and private sector collaboration. She also promoted New Zealand's education, trade and tourism sector.

In late March, Mahuta met with Chinese Foreign Minister Qin Gang in Beijing. The two foreign ministers discussed issues of concern to China-New Zealand relations including Chinese military aid to Russia during the ongoing Russian invasion of Ukraine, AUKUS, Chinese influence in the Pacific, and New Zealand concerns about the South China Sea dispute, human rights in Hong Kong and Xinjiang, and increasing tensions with Taiwan. In late June, The New Zealand Herald reported that The Australian newspaper claimed that Qin had harangued Mahuta during an hour-long meeting, citing two anonymous sources. One of the sources also claimed that Mahuta had pushed back against Qin's wolf warrior diplomacy. In response to the report, Prime Minister Hipkins confirmed that Mahuta had a "constructive" conversation with Qin but said that Mahuta had not described the meeting as a "dressing down," adding "it was important to be able to have frank conversations."

In early April, Mahuta along with foreign ministers of three other "Indo-Pacific partner countries" Australia, Japan, and South Korea attended the 2023 NATO summit to discuss several global issues including the Russian invasion of Ukraine, Chinese assertiveness in the Asia-Pacific, cybercrime and climate change.

On 8 October 2023, Mahuta expressed deep concern at the outbreak of violence during the Gaza war. She called for the immediate halt to violence, the protection of all civilians, and the upholding of international humanitarian law. ACT leader David Seymour criticised Mahuta for not condemning Hamas for its terror attacks against Israeli civilians. In response, Prime Minister Hipkins unequivocally condemned Hamas' terror attacks, stating that the target of civilians and hostage taking violated fundamental international humanitarian principles. He also stated Israel had the right to defend itself. Hipkins also denied that Mahuta was out of step with New Zealand foreign policy and stated it was a matter of timing. In mid November 2023, TVNZ reported that she had rejected advice by the Ministry of Foreign Affairs and Trade to use stronger language condemning Hamas' actions on 7 October. During an interview with TVNZ journalist Jack Tame, Mahuta attributed her Tweet to information she had received from an unidentified party and the developing situation.

=== 2023 general election ===
During the 2023 New Zealand general election, Mahuta contested the Hauraki-Waikato electorate for the Labour Party, which she had retained since 2008. On 4 October, 1News reported that a Whakaata Māori poll showed that Mahuta was being challenged by Te Pāti Māori's candidate Hana-Rawhiti Maipi-Clarke. While the poll found that Mahuta had a narrow lead of 36% over Maipi-Clark's 32%, 43% of those under 40 years preferred Maipi-Clark while 30% preferred Mahuta. However, 43% of those aged 60 years and above preferred Mahuta compared with 12% of the same demographic for Maipi-Clarke. Mahuta was unseated by Maipi-Clarke by 2,911 votes, with Maipi-Clarke set to be the youngest member of Parliament in New Zealand in 170 years. As Mahuta had chosen not to be on the party list, she lost her place in parliament.

On 11 November, Mahuta formally resigned from her ministerial portfolios. Due to the extension of the Labour caretaker government until the conclusion of coalition talks for the incoming National-led government, Grant Robertson assumed Mahuta's foreign affairs portfolio while Willie Jackson assumed the associate Māori development portfolio.

== Views and positions ==
=== Abortion ===
In 2020, Nanaia Mahuta exercised her conscience vote in opposing the Abortion Legislation Act 2020, which decriminalised abortion in New Zealand. In June 2022, Mahuta published a Twitter post condemning the United States Supreme Court's decision to overturn Roe v. Wade, which had accorded a constitutional right to abortion in the United States. Mahuta was criticised by Twitter users for hypocrisy on the grounds that she had opposed the Abortion Legislation Act. She supported the Contraception, Sterilisation, and Abortion (Safe Areas) Amendment Act 2022 that established a regulation-making power to set up safe areas around specific abortion facilities on a case-by-case basis.

In 2025, Mahuta was one of 10 women MPs from across the political spectrum to serve on the People's Select Committee, a committee organised by former National MP Marilyn Waring to take submissions on pay equity changes made by the Sixth National Government of New Zealand.

New Zealand Parliament
Preceded by Tuku Morgan	Member of Parliament for Te Tai Hauāuru; 1999–2002	Succeeded by Tariana Turia
New constituency	Member of Parliament for Tainui; 2002–2008	Constituency abolished
New constituency	Member of Parliament for Hauraki-Waikato; 2008–2023	Succeeded by Hana-Rawhiti Maipi-Clarke
Political offices
Preceded by Rick Barker	Minister of Customs; 2005–2008	Succeeded by Maurice Williamson
Preceded by Mark Burton	Minister of Local Government; 2007–2008; 2017–2023	Succeeded by Rodney Hide
Preceded by Anne Tolley	Minister of Local Government; 2007–2008; 2017–2023	Succeeded by Kieran McAnulty
Preceded by Te Ururoa Flavell	Minister for Māori Development; 2017–2020	Succeeded by Willie Jackson
Preceded by Winston Peters	Minister of Foreign Affairs; 2020–2023	Succeeded by Grant Robertson
Preceded by Phil Twyford	Minister of Disarmament and Arms Control; 2023	Succeeded by Grant Robertson
Honorary titles
Preceded by Trevor Mallard	Parent of the House (Note: Mother of the House, alongside Gerry Brownlee as the Father of the House.); 2022–2023	Succeeded by Judith Collins
