= Saeed Aghajani =

Iranian footballer

Personal information
- Full name: Saeed Aghajani
- Place of birth: Iran
- Position: Defender

Team information
- Current team: Saba Qom

Youth career
- 2007–2010: Saba Qom

Senior career*
| Years | Team | Apps | (Gls) |
| 2010– | Saba Qom | 6 | (0) |
- * Club domestic league appearances and goals as of 19 August 2011 ‡ National team caps and goals as of 24 June 2011

Saeed Aghajani is an Iranian footballer currently playing for Saba Qom in the Iranian Premier League

== Club career ==
Aghajani joined the Saba Qom reserves in 2007. Since then, he spent his entire career with the team.

| Club performance | | | League | | Cup | | Continental | | Total | |
| Season | Club | League | Apps | Goals | Apps | Goals | Apps | Goals | Apps | Goals |
| Iran | | | League | | Hazfi Cup | | Asia | | Total | |
|---|---|---|---|---|---|---|---|---|---|---|
| 2010–11 | Saba Qom | Pro League | 6 | 0 | | | - | - | | |
| 2011–12 | Saba Qom | Pro League | 0 | 0 | 0 | 0 | - | - | 0 | 0 |
| Career total | | | 6 | 0 | | | 0 | 0 | | |
