= Hauraki-Waikato =

- Single-member Māori constituency for the New Zealand House of Representatives
- Formation: 2008
- Region: Waikato
- Character: Urban and rural
- Term: 3 years

Member for Hauraki-Waikato
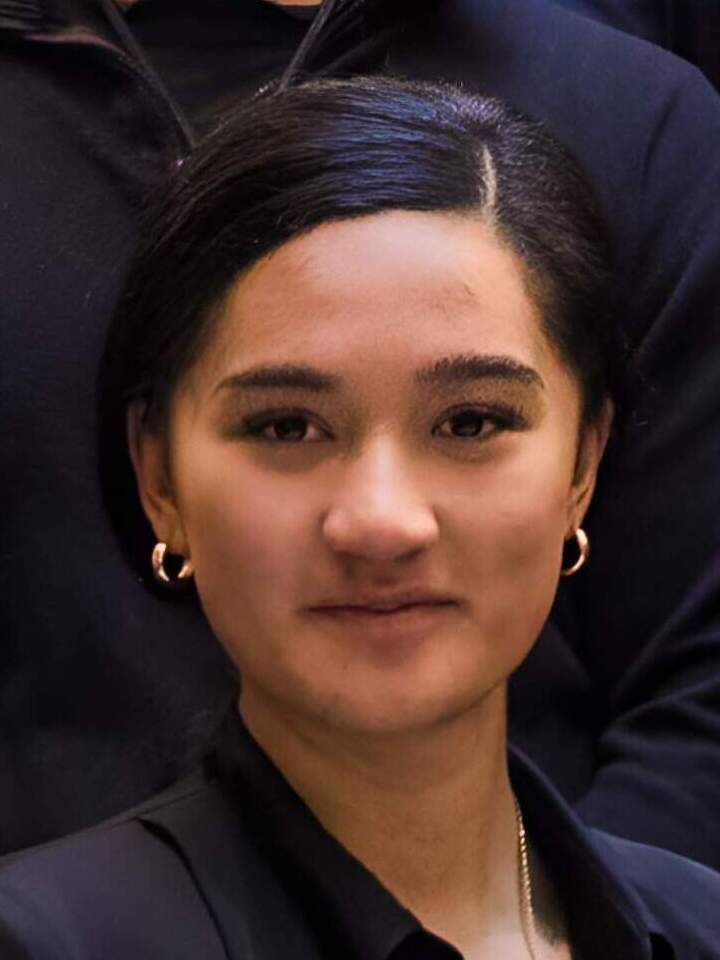
- Hana-Rawhiti Maipi-Clarke since 14 October 2023
- Party: Te Pāti Māori
- Previous MP: Nanaia Mahuta (Labour)
Party vote distribution

Hauraki-Waikato is a New Zealand parliamentary Māori electorate first established for the 2008 election. It largely replaced the Tainui electorate. Nanaia Mahuta of the Labour Party, formerly the MP for Tainui, became MP for Hauraki-Waikato in the 2008 general election and was re-elected in 2011, 2014, 2017 and 2020 before being unseated by Hana-Rawhiti Maipi-Clarke in 2023.

== Population centres ==
The electorate includes the following population centres:

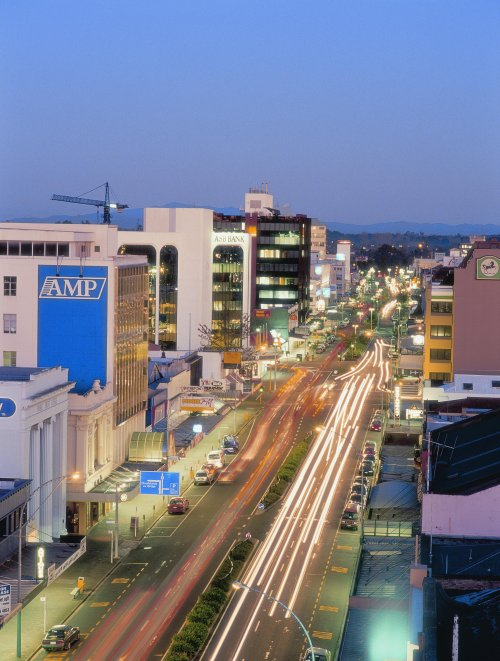
Downtown Hamilton

Within the Auckland Region: Papakura, Pukekohe, Waiuku, Clarks Beach, Ramarama, Bombay, Pōkeno.

Within the Waikato region: Meremere, Huntly, Whitianga, Whangamatā, Thames, Paeroa, Waihi, Hamilton, Ngāruawāhia, Morrinsville, Matamata, Cambridge, Te Awamutu, Raglan, Kawhia.

In the 2007 boundary redistribution, the Tainui electorate was reduced in size by transferring the tribal area of Ngāti Maniapoto to the Te Tai Hauāuru electorate, and in the process, the electorate was renamed as Hauraki-Waikato. The electorate saw no boundary adjustment in the 2013/14 redistribution.

In 2020, following the relatively higher population growth in the Hauraki-Waikato electorate than that of Tāmaki Makaurau, Hauraki-Waikato's northern boundary was contracted to east of Manurewa. Following an objection raised by the Labour Party which emphasised Waiheke Island's ferry connections to Auckland, the island was moved to Tāmaki Makaurau.

== Tribal areas ==
The electorate includes the following tribal areas: Ngāi Tai, Ngāti Huia, Ngāti Mahuta, Ngāti Maru, Ngāti Paoa, Ngāti Raukawa, Ngāti Tamaterā, Ngāti Te Ata, Waikato-Tainui, Ngāti Porou ki Hauraki, Ngāti Hako and Ngāti Tara Tokanui

== History ==
The electorate was originally proposed by Elections New Zealand as "Pare Hauraki-Pare Waikato" (Note: Translation: Tainui tribes of Hauraki – Tainui tribes of Waikato) to even out the numbers on the voting roll in Tainui and Te Tai Hauauru. Labour's Nanaia Mahuta won the 2008 election against Angeline Greensill of the Māori Party. In the 2011 election, Mahuta defeated Greensill with a greatly increased margin of 35.5% of the candidate vote. Mahuta won the 2014 election with another decisive majority.

=== Members of Parliament ===
Key

Labour Te Pāti Māori

Election	Winner
2008 election	Nanaia Mahuta
2011 election	Nanaia Mahuta
2014 election	Nanaia Mahuta
2017 election	Nanaia Mahuta
2020 election	Nanaia Mahuta
2023 election	Hana-Rawhiti Maipi-Clarke
2026 election	Hana-Rawhiti Maipi-Clarke

== Election results ==
=== 2026 election ===
The next election will be held on 7 November 2026. Candidates for Hauraki-Waikato are listed at Candidates in the 2026 New Zealand general election by electorate § Hauraki-Waikato. Official results will be available after 27 November 2026.

=== 2023 election ===
2023 general election: Hauraki-Waikato
Notes:	Blue background denotes the winner of the electorate vote. Pink background denotes a candidate elected from their party list. Yellow background denotes an electorate win by a list member, or other incumbent. A ✓ or ✗ denotes status of any incumbent, win or lose respectively.						
Party	Candidate	Votes	%	±%	Party votes	%	±%
Te Pāti Māori	Hana-Rawhiti Maipi-Clarke	12,939	51.63	+26.06	8,503	32.38	+20.38
Labour	✗ Nanaia Mahuta	10,028	40.01	–25.24	11,508	43.83	–19.55
Outdoors	Donna Pokere-Phillips	1,220	4.86	–			
Green					1,893	7.21	+1.00
National					1,292	4.92	+1.27
NZ First					974	3.71	+0.13
Freedoms NZ					323	1.23	–
NZ Loyal					310	1.10	–
ACT					294	1.11	–0.17
Legalise Cannabis					254	0.96	–0.98
Opportunities					186	0.70	–0.30
NewZeal					128	0.48	+0.20
DemocracyNZ					23	0.08	–
Women's Rights					19	0.07	–
New Conservatives					15	0.05	–0.35
Animal Justice					14	0.05	–
Leighton Baker Party					11	0.04	–
New Nation					8	0.03	–
Informal votes		873			497		
Total valid votes		25,060			26,252		
Te Pāti Māori gain from Labour	Majority	2,911	11.61	–28.08			

=== 2020 election ===
2020 general election: Hauraki-Waikato
Notes:	Blue background denotes the winner of the electorate vote. Pink background denotes a candidate elected from their party list. Yellow background denotes an electorate win by a list member, or other incumbent. A ✓ or ✗ denotes status of any incumbent, win or lose respectively.						
Party	Candidate	Votes	%	±%	Party votes	%	±%
Labour	✓ Nanaia Mahuta	15,885	65.26	−3.59	15,884	63.38	+1.88
Māori Party	Donna Pokere-Phillips	6,225	25.57	−1.79	3,008	12.00	+0.70
Advance NZ	Phillip Stephen Lambert	820	3.37	—	685	2.50	—
New Conservative	Richard Hill	426	1.75	—	100	0.40	+0.33
Green					1,557	6.21	+1.26
National					915	3.65	−3.22
NZ First					898	3.58	−4.76
Legalise Cannabis					486	1.94	+0.91
ACT					322	1.28	+1.28
Vision NZ					301	1.20	—
Opportunities					250	1.00	−1.51
ONE					69	0.28	—
Outdoors					28	0.11	+0.05
Heartland					21	0.08	—
Sustainable NZ					9	0.04	—
Social Credit					3	0.01	+0.00
TEA					1	0.00	—
Informal votes		985			525		
Total valid votes		24,341			25,062		
Labour hold	Majority	9,660	39.69	−1.80			

=== 2017 election ===
2017 general election: Hauraki-Waikato
Notes:	Blue background denotes the winner of the electorate vote. Pink background denotes a candidate elected from their party list. Yellow background denotes an electorate win by a list member, or other incumbent. A ✓ or ✗ denotes status of any incumbent, win or lose respectively.						
Party	Candidate	Votes	%	±%	Party votes	%	±%
Labour	✓ Nanaia Mahuta	15,306	68.85	+7.29	14,279	61.5	+15
Māori Party	Stanley Rahui Papa	6,083	27.36	4.66	2,635	11.3	−0.67
NZ First					1,936	8.34	−5.03
National					1,594	6.87	−0.7
Green					1,193	5.14	−4.63
Opportunities					582	2.51	+2.51
Legalise Cannabis					240	1.03	−0.43
Mana					230	0.99	−7.09 (Note: Compared to Internet Mana party vote)
People's Party					31	0.13	+0.13
Ban 1080					29	0.12	−0.04
ACT					20	0.09	−0.12
Conservative					18	0.08	−0.68
Outdoors					13	0.06	+0.06
United Future					6	0.03	−0.04
Democrats					4	0.02	+0
Internet					4	0.02	−8.06 (Note: Compared to Internet Mana party vote)
Informal votes		843			402		
Total valid votes		22,232			23,216		
Labour hold	Majority	9,223	41.49	+5.96			

=== 2014 election ===
2014 general election: Hauraki-Waikato
Notes:	Blue background denotes the winner of the electorate vote. Pink background denotes a candidate elected from their party list. Yellow background denotes an electorate win by a list member, or other incumbent. A ✓ or ✗ denotes status of any incumbent, win or lose respectively.						
Party	Candidate	Votes	%	±%	Party votes	%	±%
Labour	✓ Nanaia Mahuta	12,191	61.56	+3.19	9,724	46.50	+0.39
Māori Party	Susan Cullen	4,496	22.70	+5.35	2,504	11.97	−1.09
Mana	Angeline Greensill	3,116	15.73	-7.11			
NZ First					2,796	13.37	+3.54
Green					2,043	9.77	+0.64
Internet Mana					1,689	8.08	−3.14 (Note: Compared to Mana Movement party vote)
National					1,583	7.57	−0.76
Legalise Cannabis					306	1.46	+0.02
Conservative					159	0.76	+0.34
ACT					43	0.21	+0.00
Ban 1080					34	0.16	+0.16
United Future					14	0.07	−0.11
Focus					10	0.05	+0.05
Democrats					5	0.02	+0.01
Civilian					3	0.01	+0.01
Independent Coalition					1	0.005	+0.005
Informal votes		742			302		
Total valid votes		20,545			21,216		
Labour hold	Majority	7,695	38.86	+3.33			

=== 2011 election ===
2011 general election: Hauraki-Waikato
Notes:	Blue background denotes the winner of the electorate vote. Pink background denotes a candidate elected from their party list. Yellow background denotes an electorate win by a list member, or other incumbent. A ✓ or ✗ denotes status of any incumbent, win or lose respectively.						
Party	Candidate	Votes	%	±%	Party votes	%	±%
Labour	✓ Nanaia Mahuta	9,751	58.38	+5.88	8,250	46.11	−6.45
Mana	Angeline Greensill	3,816	22.84	+22.84	2,007	11.22	+11.22
Māori Party	Tau Bruce Mataki	2,899	17.36	−30.15	2,337	13.06	−14.62
Nga Iwi	Te Ariki Karamaene	238	1.42	+1.42			
NZ First					1,758	9.83	+4.36
Green					1,634	9.13	+5.90
National					1,491	8.33	+1.12
Legalise Cannabis					258	1.44	+0.18
Conservative					76	0.42	+0.42
ACT					37	0.21	−0.40
United Future					33	0.18	+0.01
Libertarianz					8	0.04	+0.01
Alliance					2	0.01	±0.00
Democrats					2	0.01	±0.00
Informal votes		1,078			436		
Total valid votes		16,704			17,893		
Labour hold	Majority	5,935	35.53	+30.54			

Electorate (as at 26 November 2011): 33,215

=== 2008 election ===
2008 general election: Hauraki-Waikato
Notes:	Blue background denotes the winner of the electorate vote. Pink background denotes a candidate elected from their party list. Yellow background denotes an electorate win by a list member, or other incumbent. A ✓ or ✗ denotes status of any incumbent, win or lose respectively.						
Party	Candidate	Votes	%	±%	Party votes	%	±%
Labour	✓ Nanaia Mahuta	9,349	52.49		9,819	52.55	
Māori Party	Angeline Greensill	8,461	47.51		5,172	27.68	
National					1,347	7.21	
NZ First					1,022	5.47	
Green					603	3.23	
Legalise Cannabis					236	1.26	
Family Party					138	0.74	
ACT					113	0.60	
Bill and Ben					98	0.52	
Progressive					41	0.22	
Kiwi					33	0.18	
United Future					33	0.18	
Libertarianz					7	0.04	
Workers Party					6	0.03	
Pacific					5	0.03	
RONZ					4	0.02	
RAM					3	0.02	
Alliance					2	0.01	
Democrats					2	0.01	
Informal votes		697			358		
Total valid votes		17,810			18,684		
Turnout		19,454	60.89				
Labour win new seat	Majority	888	4.99				
