= Hana-Rawhiti Maipi-Clarke =

New Zealand politician (born 2002)

Hana-Rawhiti Maipi-Clarke MP
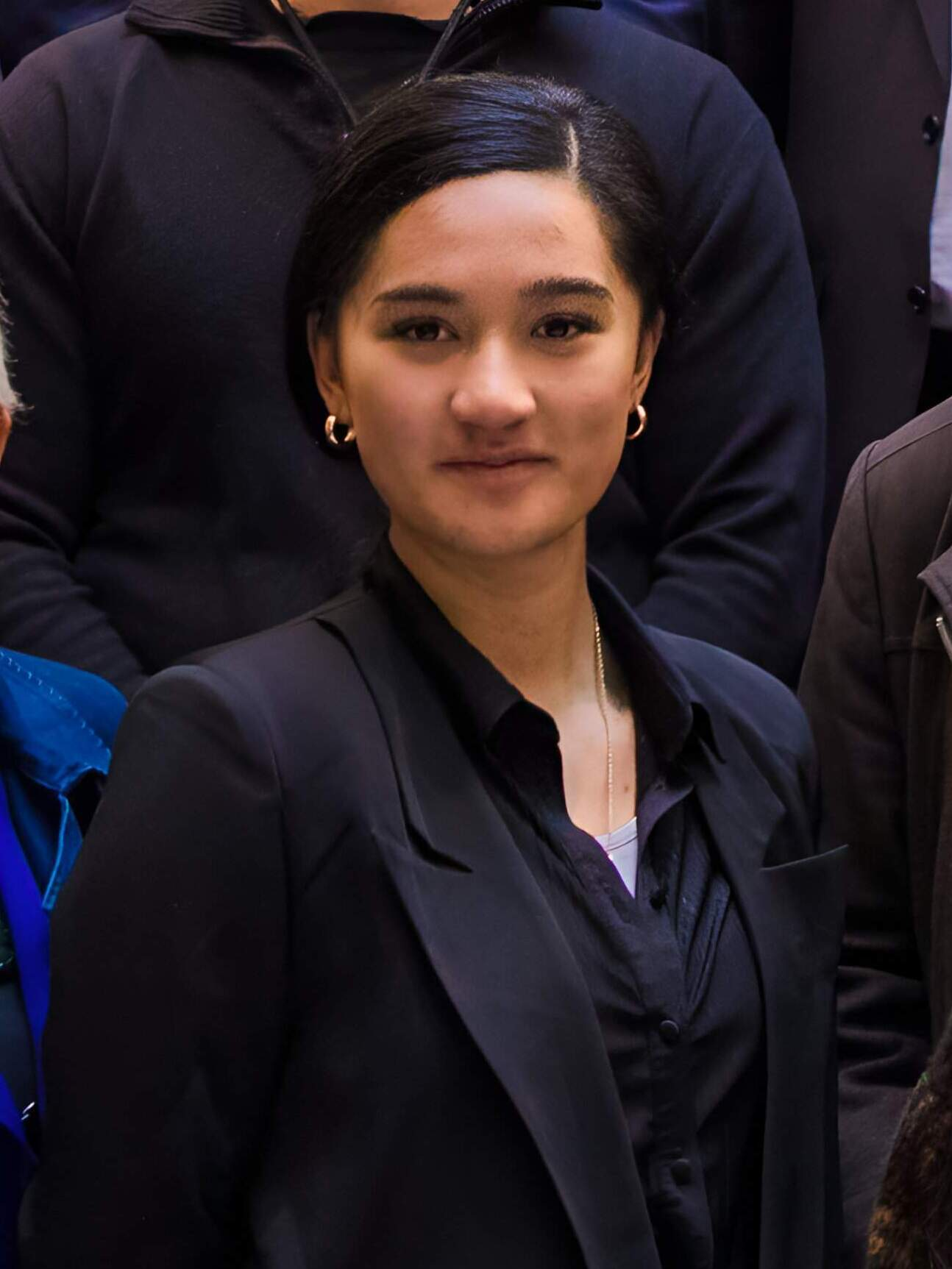
- Maipi-Clarke in 2023

Member of the New Zealand Parliament for Hauraki-Waikato
- Incumbent
- Assumed office 14 October 2023
- Preceded by: Nanaia Mahuta
- Majority: 2,911

Personal details
- Born: September 2002 (age 24)
- Party: Te Pāti Māori

Hana-Rawhiti Kareariki Maipi-Clarke (born 2002) (Note: Sources state that she was 20 in August 2023, and 21 in September 2023.) is a New Zealand politician, representing Te Pāti Māori as a Member of Parliament since the 2023 New Zealand general election. She is the youngest MP since James Stuart-Wortley.

== Early life and family ==
Maipi-Clarke has ancestry in Waikato, Ngāpuhi, Ngāti Porou, Te Āti Awa, and Ngāi Tahu. The broadcaster Potaka Maipi is her father. She is the grand-niece of Māori language activist Hana Te Hemara. Taitimu Maipi, whose activism contributed to the removal of the Captain Hamilton statue in 2020, is her grandfather. Wi Katene, the first Māori MP to be appointed to the Executive Council, was her fourth great-grandfather.

Maipi-Clarke received her education at Te Wharekura o Rākaumangamanga in Huntly. Aged 17, she published a book Maahina about maramataka – the Māori lunar calendar. She was inspired by Rangi Mātāmua to research the topic when he lectured about Matariki. In 2023, she gave a training course to the New Zealand Warriors about maramataka and Matariki.

== Political career ==
New Zealand Parliament
Years	Term	Electorate	List	Party
2023–2026	54th	Hauraki-Waikato	4	Te Pāti Māori
2026–present	55th	Hauraki-Waikato	none	Te Pāti Māori

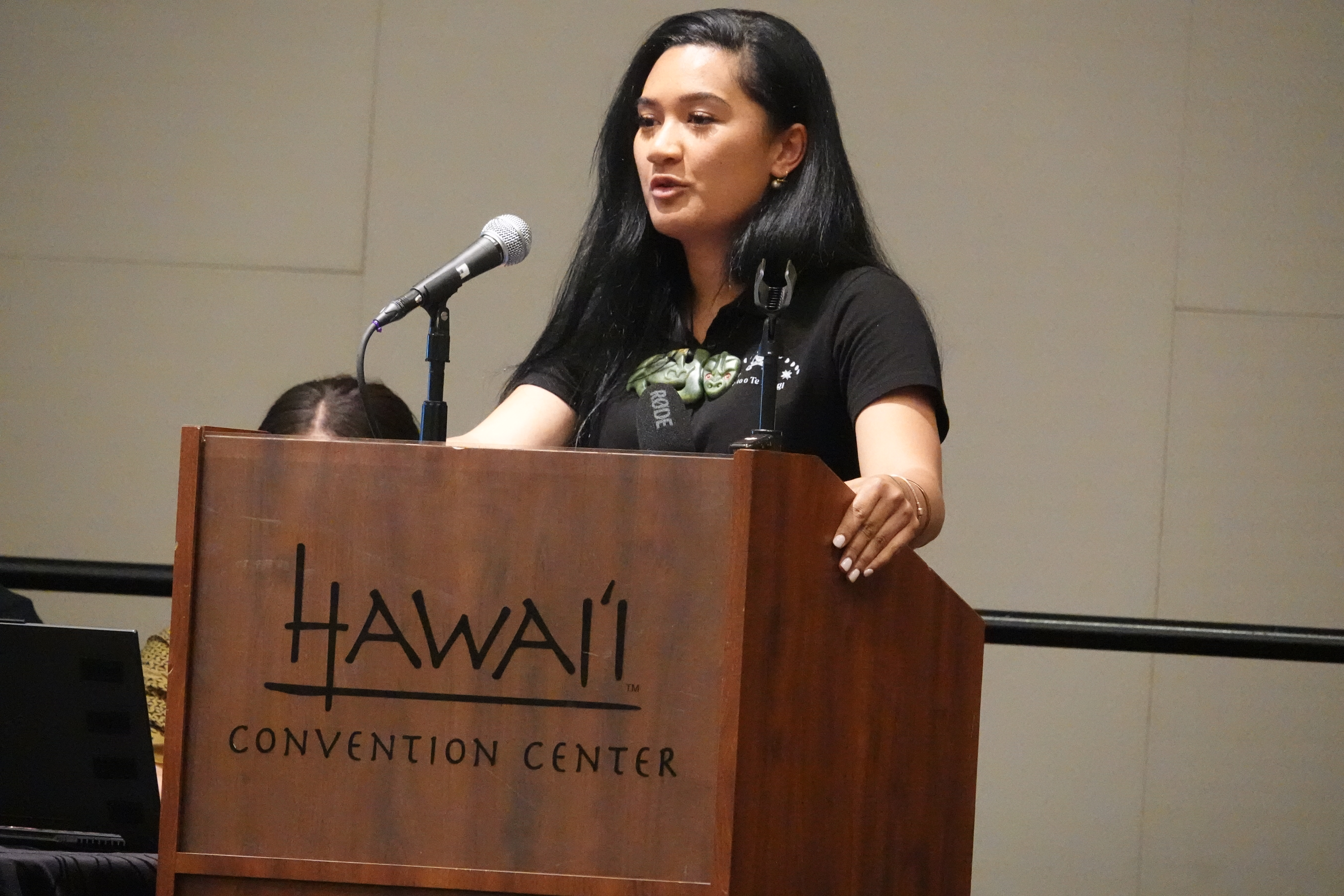
Maipi-Clarke speaking at a Young Pacific Leaders event held by the United States Department of State in June 2024.

=== 2023 general election ===
During Te Wiki o te Reo Māori in September 2022, Maipi-Clarke gave a speech on the steps of Parliament House. Maipi-Clarke's father claimed that several political parties approached Maipi-Clarke afterwards, asking her to consider joining them.

Both Maipi-Clarke and her father were under consideration by Te Pāti Māori as candidates for the Hauraki-Waikato electorate. In the end, the party wanted a "youthful perspective" and she was selected to contest the electorate at the 2023 election. She was 4th on the 2023 party list.

During the campaign, five reports of concern were made to police by Te Pāti Māori over several incidents relating to Maipi-Clarke, which included a stolen election hoarding, suspicious vehicle, and an alleged burglary. The party described the incidents as politically-motivated attacks and a home invasion. An elderly man alleged to be a well-known National Party campaigner was also issued a trespass notice in one instance.

Police said the incidents reported did not appear to be racially motivated, or coordinated, adding it was unable to establish any criminality. Maipi-Clarke described one of the incidents as a "ram raid", which she later clarified in an interview meant her privacy had been ram-raided.

=== First term, 2023–present ===
In the 2023 general election held on 14 October, Maipi-Clarke unseated incumbent Labour MP Nanaia Mahuta by a margin of 2,911 votes. Elected at 21 years old, Maipi-Clarke became the second youngest member of Parliament in New Zealand, and the youngest in 170 years; the only younger MP was James Stuart-Wortley, who lied about his age and was elected at age 20 in the country's first general election in 1853.

By mid-December 2023, Maipi-Clarke had joined Parliament's Māori affairs select committee. She also became Te Pāti Māori's Māori development, rangatahi (young people), Māori language, Kai (food) sovereignty, agriculture, conservation, sports and recreation, food safety, biosecurity and customs spokesperson.

In mid-September 2024, Maipi-Clarke became one of the four recipients of the 2024 One Young World Politician of the Year Award. The organisation awarded her the award on the basis that "her involvement in the political realm allowed young Māori and the younger generation to have a voice within New Zealand's democracy".

==== 2024 haka protest ====
On 14 November 2024, Maipi-Clarke protested the Treaty Principles Bill in New Zealand's parliament. If passed, the bill would define principles of the treaty between Māori and The Crown. Māori groups and critics of the bill have argued that the bill would disrupt established interpretations of the treaty and undermine traditional Māori rights. Maipi-Clarke stated her party's voting position; six votes opposed. She then tore her copy of the bill in two during its first reading in Parliament, while leading the haka "Ka Mate". Following this, the Speaker, Gerry Brownlee, suspended Parliament for 20 minutes as well as naming Maipi-Clarke for her actions, suspending her from Parliament for 24 hours. Video of the haka received hundreds of millions of views online. On 10 December 2024, Brownlee referred Maipi-Clarke along with Te Pāti Māori co-leaders Rawiri Waititi and Debbie Ngarewa-Packer, and Labour MP Peeni Henare to the Privileges Committee for their involvement in the haka during the first reading of the Treaty Principles Bill.

On 1 April 2025, Maipi-Clarke, Waititi and Ngarewa-Packer declined to appear before the Privileges Committee, claiming they had been denied key legal rights such as a joint hearing, restrictions on their legal representation Christopher Finlayson, expert testimony from tikanga expert Tā Pou Temara denied, hearing scheduling conflicts being ignored and concerns about disciplinary action against Maipi-Clarke. On 2 April, Chairperson of the Privileges Committee Judith Collins confirmed that the privileges hearing would proceed regardless of whether or not the three TPM MPs turned up. In response, Te Pāti Māori's leadership announced that the trio would boycott the hearing and hold their own "alternative independent hearing," dismissing the Privileges Committee as a "kangaroo court."

On 14 May, the Privileges Committee recommended censuring Maipi-Clarke, Ngarewa-Packer and Waititi for "acting in a manner that could have the effect of intimidating a member of the House in the discharge of their duty" during the haka protest. They recommended Maipi-Clarke be suspended from Parliament for seven days and the two co-leaders be suspended for 21 days. In response, she denounced the suspension as "grossly unjust, unfair and unwarranted… This was not about process, this became personal". Parliament must vote on whether to implement the punishment. On 20 May 2025, Parliament adopted Leader of the House Chris Bishop's motion that the parliamentary debate on the TPM MPs' suspension be delayed until 5 June, allowing them to participate in the budget debate on 22 May. On 5 June, parliament voted to suspend Maipi-Clarke for seven days and Ngarewa-Packer and Waititi for 21 days.

=== 2026 general election ===
During the 2026 New Zealand general election, Maipi-Clark contested the Hauraki-Waikato electorate for Te Pāti Māori. Her party opted to stand seven candidates within the Māori electorates, telling their supporters to give their party votes to the Labour and Green parties. On 7 November, she retained the Hauraki-Waikato electorate for TPM by a margin of 10,441 votes, based on preliminary results.

== Views and positions ==
During her maiden speech in December 2023, Maipi-Clarke criticised the National-led coalition government, claiming that it had "attacked my whole world from every corner". She identified health, the environment, water, land, natural resources and children as key areas of disagreement with the government.

Maipi-Clarke has supported lowering the voting age to 16 years.

In November 2025, Maipi-Clarke likened the ongoing internal conflict within Te Pāti Māori to a "a divorce between two parents" and urged reconciliation between the two sides.

== Awards ==
In September 2024, Maipi-Clarke won the One Young World Politician of the Year Award, and in December was included on the BBC's 100 Women list. In October 2025, she was included in Time's 2025 Time100 Next list of the "world's most influential rising stars".

== Footnotes ==
New Zealand Parliament
Preceded by Nanaia Mahuta	Member of Parliament for Hauraki-Waikato; 2023–present	Incumbent
Preceded by Chlöe Swarbrick	Baby of the House; 2023–present	Incumbent
