= Stuff (website) =

New Zealand news website

- Wordmark

- Screenshot of the Stuff main page, taken on 5 April 2018
- Website type: News
- Available in: English
- Owner: Stuff Limited
- Creator: Independent Newspapers
- Website: stuff.co.nz
- Commercial: Yes
- Registration: Optional
- Launched: 27 June 2000; 26 years ago
- Current status: Online

Stuff is a New Zealand news media website owned by newspaper conglomerate Stuff Ltd (formerly called Fairfax). As of early 2024, it is the most popular news website in New Zealand, with a monthly unique audience of more than 2 million.

Stuff was founded in 2000, and publishes breaking news, weather, sport, politics, video, entertainment, business and life and style content from Stuff Ltd's newspapers, which include New Zealand's second- and third-highest circulation daily newspapers, The Post and The Press, and the highest circulation weekly, Sunday Star-Times, as well as international news wire services.

Stuff has won numerous awards at the Newspaper Publishers' Association awards including 'Best News Website or App' in 2014 and 2019, and 'Website of the Year' in 2013 and 2018, 'Best News Website in 2019', and 'Digital News Provider of the Year' in 2024 and 2025.

== History ==
=== Independent Newspapers Ltd, 2000–2003 ===
The former New Zealand media company Independent Newspapers Ltd (INL), owned by News Corp Australia, launched Stuff on 27 June 2000 at a cybercafe in Auckland, after announcing its intention to go online more than a year earlier. The development of Stuff was supported by Mark Wierzbicki, founding Internet Business Manager. Advertising agency Saatchi & Saatchi conceived the name "Stuff", and INL had to buy the domain name from a cyber squatter. In its first month, the site had 120,000 unique visitors. At the time, Wierzbicki described the name as a copywriter's dream, although he conceded that "it's not without risk, especially if we stuff up." The start up was built by a group of engineers from a few tech companies in Wellington led by founding CTO and engineering manager Will Everitt and used a software platform from News Corp Australia's news.com.au.

=== Fairfax Media and Nine Entertainment, 2003–2020 ===
On 30 June 2003, INL sold its publishing assets including The Dominion Post, The Press, and the Stuff website to Fairfax Media.

Fairfax upgraded the website in December 2006, and again on 4 March 2009, adding the ability for visitors to personalise the homepage. The first mobile phone news service from Stuff began in 2003, in a partnership with Vodafone New Zealand. On 21 April 2009, Stuff launched a dedicated mobile site.

Logo used from 2016 to 2022

On 1 February 2018, the parent company of Stuff changed its name from Fairfax New Zealand Limited to Stuff Limited. In July 2018 Stuff was merged into Nine Entertainment.

=== Sinead Boucher, 2020–present ===
On 25 May 2020, Nine Entertainment sold Stuff and its holdings including the Stuff website to Stuff's CEO Sinead Boucher for NZ$1, with the transaction completed on 31 May. This marks the return of the company into New Zealand ownership.

On 30 May 2022, Stuff updated its logo and brand colours.

On 27 April 2023, Stuff confirmed that it would launch separate subscription-based websites for three of its newspapers: The Post, The Press, and Waikato Times. These websites will co-exist with the Stuff news website, which will remain free.

On 17 January 2024, Stuff rolled out a new website and app with a new layout and design. It was immediately met with overwhelming criticism, due to a number of features and sections previously being available removed, including the search function and the technology section. The new design also caused a number of functionality issues, mostly around loading the new homepage with several users reporting the homepage to be stuck in a loading loop. A story posted by Stuff touting the new design and also seeking feedback received over 300 responses with about a dozen positive and the rest negative. Comments on this story were later removed. Since the rollout, traffic and readership has reportedly dropped by up to 20%.

On 6 October 2024, Stuff Digital's Head of Growth Janine Fenwick confirmed that Stuff.co.nz would be reorganising its regional news content. Content from the Stuff Group's North Island newspapers Taranaki Daily News, Manawatu Standard and the Wairarapa Times-Age would be hosted on The Post's website while South Island newspapers The Southland Times, Nelson Mail, Timaru Herald and Marlborough Express would be hosted on The Press's website. This reorganisation was part of the Stuff Group's transition towards a paywall system, with readers being offered unlimited access to content on The Post, The Press and Waikato Times websites for a NZ$1.99 weekly subscription fee.

In December 2024, the Stuff website was reorganised under the Stuff Digital umbrella, a division that also includes the social media platform Neighbourly and the evening news bulletin ThreeNews. In June 2025, online retailer Trade Me acquired a 50 percent stake in Stuff Digital and its assets including the Stuff website.

== Awards and nominations ==
Stuff.co.nz has won numerous awards at the Newspaper Publishers' Association awards (currently branded as the Voyager Media Awards) including Best News Website or App in 2014 and 2019, and Website of the Year in 2013 and 2018.

== Content and coverage ==
In July 2008, during the trial of Clayton Weatherston, press.co.nz, a subsidiary section on Stuff, accidentally ran the headline "Guilty of Murder" the day before the jury delivered the verdict. The article was quickly withdrawn, and Fairfax executive editor Paul Thompson said it was a mistake "we take very seriously."

On 17 April 2013, to celebrate the passing of same-sex marriage in New Zealand, the colour of the Stuff logo was changed from black to the colours associated with the pride flag.

In 2017, Stuff's first podcast Black Hands received over 3 million downloads and was the number one podcast in five countries. Stuff also produced Gone Fishing with Radio New Zealand, which won podcast of the year at the 2019 NZ Radio Awards.

In 2018 Stuff launched Quick! Save the Planet to increase news coverage of climate change in New Zealand and in 2019 Stuff joined the Covering Climate Now international initiative.

=== Stuff Circuit ===
In 2019, Stuff launched an investigative journalism documentary series called Stuff Circuit with funding from New Zealand on Air. Notable titles and topics have included Big Decision (abortion law reform), Life + Limb (New Zealand's military involvement in the War in Afghanistan), False Profit (which focused on conspiracy theorist and New Zealand Public Party founder Billy Te Kahika), Deleted (which looked at New Zealand companies alleged to be complicit in human rights abuses in Xinjiang), Disordered (which focused on the treatment of people with Foetal Alcohol Syndrome), and Fire and Fury (which looked at vaccine disinformation and conspiracy theories in the wake of the 2022 Wellington protests). The documentaries are published on Stuff's website.

In November 2019, Stuff's Life + Limb documentary's coverage of unexploded ordnance on New Zealand Defence Force firing ranges in Afghanistan prompted Prime Minister Jacinda Ardern to order the clearing of the ranges.

== See also ==
- Media of New Zealand

== Sources ==
- Crean, Mike (2011). The Press: First with the News: An Illustrated History. Auckland: Random House NZ. ISBN 978-1869795627.
