= The Post (New Zealand newspaper) =

Newspaper published in Wellington, New Zealand

- The 2 March 2012 front page of The Dominion Post
- Type: Daily newspaper
- Format: Tabloid (Mon–Fri); Broadsheet (Saturday)
- Owner: Stuff Ltd
- Founded: 2002
- Headquarters: Wellington, New Zealand
- Circulation: 36,652 (2019)
- ISSN: 1175-9488
- Website: www.thepost.co.nz

The Post (formerly The Dominion Post, Māori: Te Upoko o Te Ika lit. 'Head of the Fish') is a metropolitan daily newspaper published in Wellington, New Zealand. It is owned by media business Stuff Ltd, and formerly by the New Zealand branch of Australian media company Fairfax Media. Weekday issues are now in tabloid format, and its Saturday edition is in broadsheet format.

The Dominion Post was created in July 2002 with the merger of two metropolitan broadsheet newspapers, The Evening Post and The Dominion. It was announced in April 2023 that the paper would be renamed The Post. The change of name has garnered a generally unenthusiastic to negative response. Since June 2026, the editor has been Matthew Hooton.

== History ==
=== The Dominion Post, 2002–2023 ===
The Dominion Post (commonly referred to as The DomPost) was created in July 2002 when Independent Newspapers Limited (INL) amalgamated two Wellington printed and published metropolitan broadsheet newspapers, The Evening Post, an evening paper first published on 8 February 1865, and The Dominion, a morning paper first published on Dominion Day, 26 September 1907.

The Dominion was distributed throughout the lower half of the North Island, as far as Taupo, where it met with Auckland's ambitiously named The New Zealand Herald. The Evening Post was not so widely distributed, but had a much greater circulation than The Dominion. After the titles were merged, The Dominion Post was the only daily newspaper in Wellington City. It was printed in Petone, Lower Hutt.

INL sold The Dominion Post and all other New Zealand newspapers and most magazines in its catalogue to Fairfax Media in 2003. On 1 February 2018, Fairfax New Zealand Limited changed its name to Stuff Limited (named after its Stuff website, which launched in 2000). In December 2018, Fairfax Media merged with Australia's Nine Entertainment, which acquired its stable of New Zealand newspapers.

On 25 May 2020, Nine Entertainment sold its holdings, including The Dominion Post, to Stuff's CEO Sinead Boucher for NZ$1, with the transaction completed on 31 May 2024. This marked the return of the company to New Zealand ownership.

=== The Post, 2023–present ===
On 14 April 2023, it was announced that the paper would change its name by dropping "Dominion" from the title. The editor, Caitlin Cherry, laid out the rationale:

As an independently owned New Zealand company, we are under no-one’s dominion. New Zealand’s status as a dominion ended in 1945 when we joined the United Nations. It’s time for the word to go.

On 27 April 2023, Stuff confirmed that The Dominion Post would adopt its new name The Post on 29 April. Stuff also announced that it would launch a new subscription-based website for The Post that would co-exist with the free Stuff news website.

The change of name was criticised on both the political left and right. Former Dominion Post editor Tim Pankhurst was skeptical, saying it was "short-sighted", given that market research conducted in 2002 indicated that the Dominion Post masthead had better name recognition within Wellington than Coca-Cola's logo. Colin Peacock from RNZ Mediawatch dismissed the name change as "bit of branding" and expected "a bit of blowback" from older readers.

The dropping of "Dominion", a word described by legal expert Grant Morris as "not actually that important", was perceived by some as virtue signalling. Morris also pointed out that no Act of Parliament has actually revoked New Zealand's status as a Dominion, which it held from 1907 until the Statute of Westminster was adopted in 1947.

The name change was also thought by some to be hypocritical for suggesting an anti-imperialist stance, given the newspaper's historical bias against Māori, for which Stuff apologised in 2020. The name The Post was considered bland and unoriginal by many, with Newstalk ZB describing it as "an act reflective of a complete lack of any creativity".

In December 2024, The Spinoff reported that Stuff would be restructured into two divisions: Stuff Digital and Masthead Publishing. Stuff Digital was given oversight over stuff.co.nz, Neighbourly and its audio and video divisions. Masthead Publishing was given responsibility over the company's newspaper brands and their websites, including The Post.

== Editors ==
Richard Long had been the editor of The Dominion for ten years and was appointed the inaugural editor for The Dominion Post, but resigned shortly after the newspaper merger. Tim Pankhurst joined The Dominion Post shortly after it was founded to take over from Long. He resigned in February 2009 to head the New Zealand Press Association. Bernadette Courtney, who had previously been assistant editor at The Dominion Post and had gone to become editor of the Manawatu Standard, was appointed to replace Pankhurst. Courtney started in a national role for Stuff in 2018 and was replaced by Eric Janssen.

Anna Fifield was appointed editor October 2020. She left in December 2022. Caitlin Cherry took over in February 2023, Tracy Watkins in July 2023, and Matthew Hooton in 2026.

The following table lists the editors:

Name	Portrait	Term of office	
Richard Long		2002	
Tim Pankhurst		2002	2009
Bernadette Courtney		2009	2018
Eric Janssen		2018	2020
Anna Fifield		2020	2022
Caitlin Cherry		2023	2023
Tracy Watkins		2023	2026
Matthew Hooton		2026	present

== Awards and nominations received ==
Year	Award	Category	Result
2017	Voyager Media Awards	Best Newspaper-inserted Magazine	Winner
2017	Voyager Media Awards	Best coverage of a major news event	Joint winner
2009	Qantas Media Awards	Best Website Breaking News Story	Joint winner
2009	Qantas Media Awards	Editorial Project with Significant Impact upon the Community	Winner
2009	Qantas Media Awards	Best Website Design	Finalist
2009	Qantas Media Awards	Best Daily Newspaper (Over 30,000 circulation)	Finalist
2009	Qantas Media Awards	Best Website Multi Media/Video Presentation	Finalist

=== Awards and nominations for journalists employed by The Post ===
Year	Award	Category	Recipient	Result
2018	Voyager Media Awards	Opinion Writing – Humour/Satire	Dave Armstrong	Winner
2018	Voyager Media Awards	Cartoonist of the Year	Sharon Murdoch	Winner
2017	Voyager Media Awards	Feature Writer of the Year	Nikki Macdonald	Winner
2017	Voyager Media Awards	Cartoonist of the Year	Sharon Murdoch	Winner
2017	Voyager Media Awards	Opinion Writer of the Year	Duncan Garner	Winner
2009	Qantas Media Awards	Best Blog	Greer McDonald	Finalist
2009	Qantas Media Awards	Best Blog	Adam Brown	Finalist
2009	Qantas Media Awards	Best Single Website Report	Phil Kitchin and Diego Opatowski	Winner
2009	Qantas Media Awards	Best Senior Reporter	Phil Kitchin	Winner
2009	Qantas Media Awards	Best Senior Reporter	Bernadette Courtney	Finalist
2009	Qantas Media Awards	Best Junior Reporter	Matt Calman	Finalist
2009	Qantas Media Awards	Cartoonist of the Year	Tom Scott	Winner
