= The Hutt News =

Community newspaper in New Zealand

- Type: Weekly Newspaper
- Format: Tabloid
- Owner: Stuff Ltd
- Founded: 1927
- Ceased publication: 31 July 2025
- Headquarters: Lower Hutt, New Zealand
- ISSN: 1170-0564
- Website: Website

The Hutt News was a community newspaper circulated in Lower Hutt, New Zealand. It was one of the earliest and longest running community newspapers in the country. It was shut down by Stuff in late July 2025.

== History ==
The paper was established in 1927 by Walter Harold Smith, a retired farmer. Smith felt Lower Hutt should have its own paper as its population was approaching that of neighbouring Petone (which had managed to sustain a newspaper since 1887). It was first issued in April 1927 via the patronage of the local Businessmen's Association. Prior to this the residents had access to The Wellington Independent, New Zealand Gazette and Wellington Spectator and Petone Chronicle.

In 1928, Smith was joined by brothers James and William Kerr of the Petone Chronicle. They formed the Hutt Printing and Publishing Company to produce the paper. Smith remained Managing Director of the paper with William Kerr assisting him with James remaining with the Petone Chronicle. The Hutt News thrived due to large population growth in the area in the 1940s and 1950s despite production being threatened during World War II owing to staff shortages which forced it to rely on printers from the Trentham Military Camp staff in Upper Hutt to continue in circulation.

In 1948 Smith died and William Kerr took over as the Managing Director. In 1953 the Hutt Printing and Publishing Company took over the Petone Chronicle, continuing to publish it until 1967. In 1961 William Kerr's son Ted became Managing Director after his father's death. In 1963 Ted Kerr sold the paper to the Evening Post. The Hutt News then became part of Independent Newspapers Limited (INL) in 1972 after it purchased the Post's parent company. In 2003 its changed owners again when Fairfax Media purchased INL.

In early July 2025, parent company Stuff (the successor to Fairfax New Zealand) confirmed that it would shut down The Hutt News and 14 other community newspapers.
