= Independent Newspapers =

Former media company in New Zealand

- Industry: Publishing
- Founded: 1906; 120 years ago
- Headquarters: New Zealand

Independent Newspapers Limited (INL) was a newspaper publisher in New Zealand. Started as the Wellington Publishing Company in 1906 to publish The Dominion, it began taking over other newspapers in the 1970s and was renamed Independent Newspapers in 1972. It accumulated more than 80 publications before selling them all to Fairfax in 2003. INL then merged into Sky Network Television in 2005. INL was part-owned by News Limited since early in 1964, when Rupert Murdoch made his first overseas newspaper investment – a 29.57 percent stake in the Wellington Publishing Company. The News Limited holding in INL fluctuated over the years and was just over 49 percent in 1997.

== History ==
=== Origins ===
The company sprang out of the Wellington Publishing Company Limited that had been founded in 1906 to publish Wellington's morning daily, The Dominion. In 1970 Wellington Publishing Company made a successful takeover bid for Truth (NZ) Ltd and the following year acquired Independent Publishers Ltd, owner of the Waikato Times. In 1972 it took over Blundell Bros Limited, publisher of Wellington's Evening Post which had started in 1865.

Later in 1972 the company changed its name to Independent Newspapers Limited. Around this time INL Print Limited (later Inprint Ltd) was formed to combine the printing and publishing operations of the commercial printing companies which operated prior to the various mergers.

=== Expansion ===
Some of the oldest newspapers in New Zealand joined the INL stable in the next two decades. In 1980 it took over The Manawatu Standard Limited, publisher of the Evening Standard since 1880. Four years later the company shifted its sights to the South Island, acquiring 122-year-old The Southland Times. The following year, 1985, it took over The Timaru Herald, founded in 1864 and a daily newspaper since 1878. In 1987 the Christchurch Press Co Ltd, publisher of The Press since 1861, joined the INL group.

INL moved north again in 1989, buying the Taranaki Herald and part of NZ News Limited, including the Auckland Star, the Sunday Star and Suburban Newspapers (Auckland), New Zealand's largest group of free community newspapers. The Auckland Star was subsequently closed down.

In 1993 INL moved south again, acquiring the Nelson Evening Mail (since renamed The Nelson Mail). The Marlborough Express was bought in 1998 and a number of small community newspapers have also been acquired in recent times, including South Otago Newspapers.

INL's New Zealand divisions eventually published more than 80 daily, Sunday, community, suburban and weekly newspaper titles, magazines and specialist publications. New Zealand growth was complemented by offshore expansion. Independent News Corp (Inc) was formed in the United States and acquired a string of suburbans in Houston Texas and a number of newspapers on the West Coast by 1988. INL's US interests were sold in July 1998.

=== Diversification ===
In 1990 INL invested $200 million in Gordon and Gotch magazine distributors in Australia and New Zealand, their allied business and regional newspapers in Victoria, Australia. These operations were bought from major INL shareholder News Ltd. In 1993 it divested itself of Wiljef Stationery and its computer consumables company Microtronix, acquired as part of the Gordon and Gotch deal but regarded as outside INL's "core" business. It also sold its large commercial printing division (Adams Print) to Pacific Magazine and Printing Limited. Late in 1999 INL announced it was selling its Australian Gordon and Gotch division, but was retaining Gordon and Gotch (NZ) Ltd.

Early in 1964 Rupert Murdoch's News Limited made his first overseas newspaper investment - a 29.57 percent stake in the Wellington Publishing Company. The News Limited holding in INL fluctuated over the years and rose to 50 percent in August 1969. By 1997, News Limited's shares were just over 49 percent.

Having established a strong newspaper publishing network, INL turned its interests to building a magazine division in New Zealand with publications focusing on home, family and outdoor leisure activities - homes, gardening, fishing, boating - along with motoring magazines.

INL took a 25% interest in Terabyte, a web design and development company, in 1994. This was increased to 51% in June 1995. INL sold its interest in Terabyte Interactive in 1999.

=== Merger and spinoff ===
INL bought 48% of Sky Network Television in 1997. INL started Stuff.co.nz, a news website, in 2000.

It sold its publishing assets, including Wellington's Dominion Post, to the John Fairfax conglomerate of Australia on 30 June 2003. This left it with a 78% stake in Sky Network Television as its main asset. In July 2005, Independent Newspapers merged with Sky Network Television into a new company, MergeCo, which was renamed Sky Network Television Limited.

Independent Newspapers' publications became part of Fairfax New Zealand. On 1 February 2018, Fairfax New Zealand changed its name to Stuff Limited. In July 2018, Stuff's parent company Fairfax Media merged with Australia's Nine Entertainment, which acquired Stuff's stable of New Zealand newspapers. On 31 May 2020, Nine Entertainment sold Stuff and its New Zealand newspaper assets to the company's chief executive Sinead Boucher for NZ$1, bringing them back into New Zealand hands.

== Bibliography ==
- Grant, Ian (August 2018). Lasting Impressions: The story of New Zealand's newspapers, 1840-1920 (Paperback ed.). Masterton: Fraser Books. ISBN 9780994136046.
- Grant, Ian (May 2024). Pressing On: The story of New Zealand's newspapers, 1921-2000 (Paperback ed.). Masterton: Fraser Books. ISBN 9781991164452.
