= The Sun-Herald =

Australian Sunday newspaper

- Part of front page from 4 January 2026
- Type: Weekly (Sunday)
- Format: Compact
- Owner: Nine Entertainment
- Founded: 11 October 1953
- Political alignment: Centrist
- Language: English
- Headquarters: North Sydney, New South Wales, Australia
- Circulation: 264,434 (December 2013)
- ISSN: 1323-1987
- OCLC number: 67710301
- Website: www.smh.com.au

The Sun-Herald is an Australian newspaper published in tabloid or compact format on Sundays in Sydney by Nine Entertainment. It is the Sunday counterpart of The Sydney Morning Herald. In the six months to September 2005, The Sun-Herald had a circulation of 515,000. According to the Audit Bureau of Circulations, its circulation had dropped to 443,257 as of December 2009 and to 313,477 as of December 2010, from which its management inferred a readership of 868,000. Readership continued to tumble to 264,434 by the end of 2013, and has half the circulation of rival The Sunday Telegraph.

Its predecessor broadsheet was known as The Sunday Herald and published in the years 1949 to 1953. In 1953, Fairfax Media bought The Sun, an afternoon paper, and merged its Sunday edition with the Sunday Herald to become the tabloid Sun-Herald.

The Brisbane edition of The Sun-Herald has content from the Brisbane Times.

On 23 May 2010, The Sun-Herald published its first section in 3D with included glasses, the first of its kind in Australia. The sections were sponsored by Harvey Norman and intended to promote the then-upcoming State of Origin rugby league series.

== Liftouts and sections ==
- S – Entertainment and lifestyle
- Sunday Life
- Travel
- Money
- Sunday Domain
- Sports Sunday
- Television – TV listings

== Sponsorships ==
The City2Surf, a 14-kilometre fun run established in 1971, starting from the Sydney central business district and concluding at Bondi Beach, is organised by the Sun-Herald, which along with Westpac serves as its sponsor.

== Digitisation ==
The paper has been partially digitised as part of the Australian Newspapers Digitisation Program project of the National Library of Australia.

== Sport ==
The Sun-Herald is known for its extensive coverage of the National Rugby League competition, of which nine clubs are based in Sydney. Nine News Sydney sports reporter Danny Weidler is a regular sports columnist.
