= WAtoday =

Western Australian online newspaper

- WAtoday front page 10 June 2008
- Website type: Online-only newspaper
- Available in: Australian English
- Founded: 10 June 2008
- Headquarters: Perth, Western Australia
- Owner: Nine Entertainment
- Founder: Fairfax Media
- Employees: 10
- Website: www.watoday.com.au

WAtoday is an online newspaper, focusing its coverage on Perth and Western Australia. It was established on 10 June 2008 by Fairfax Media and was included in the 2018 sale to Nine Entertainment. In April 2009, a one-off print edition was produced as a promotion.

It employs ten journalists in Perth and is based in the same building as the Nine Network on St Georges Terrace.

It is in competition with the online services provided by The West Australian and PerthNow both owned by the Southern Cross Media Group.

== See also ==
- Brisbane Times
- Northern Territory News
