= Richard Long (journalist) =

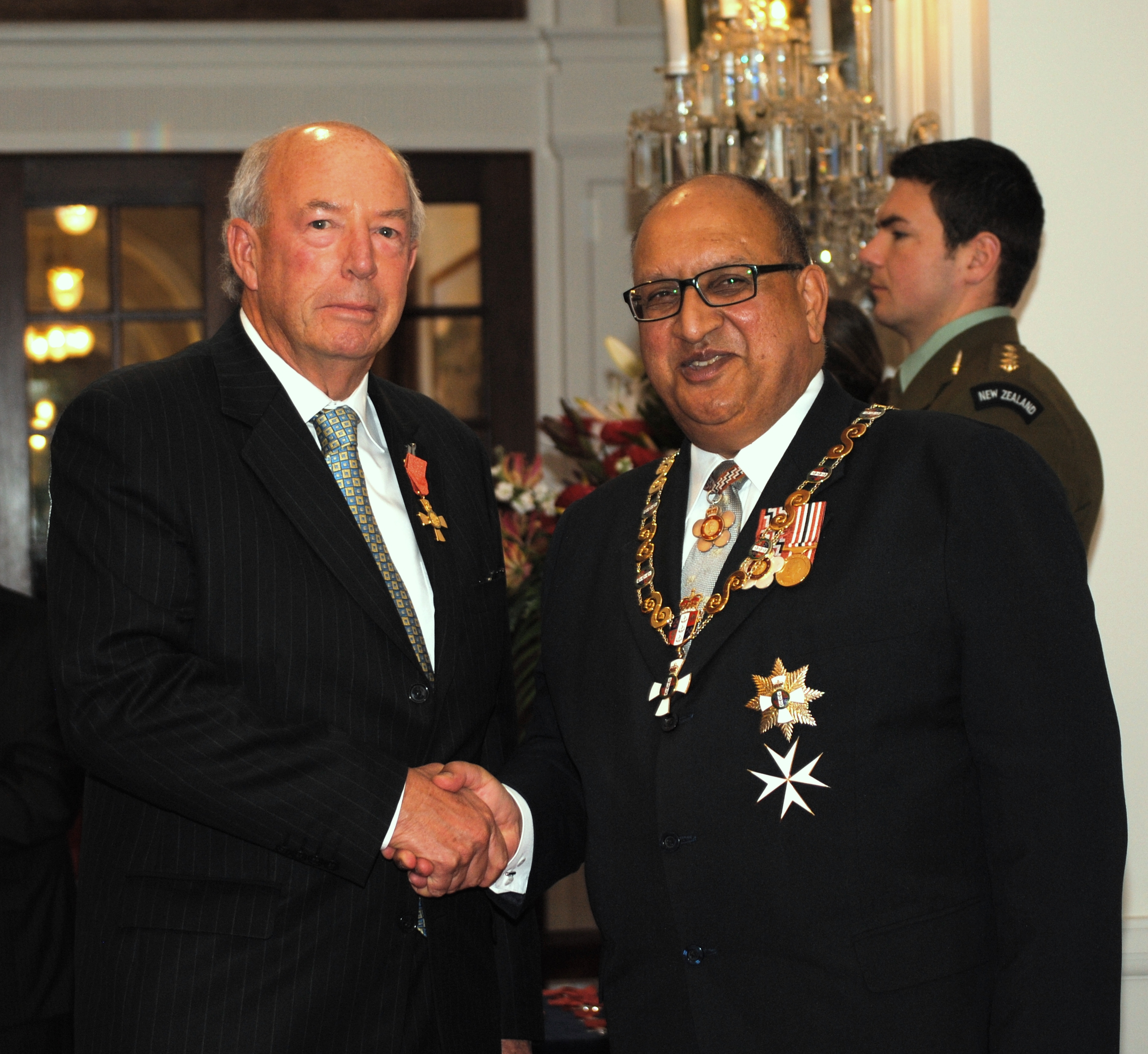
Long (left), after his investiture as an Officer of the New Zealand Order of Merit by the governor-general, Sir Anand Satyanand, in 2011

Richard Arthur Long ONZM (born c.1940) is a New Zealand journalist, and a former editor of The Dominion newspaper.

Long held senior editorial positions with the Waikato Times and then the Taranaki Herald. In 1991, he joined The Dominion as their editor. After the merger of The Dominion with The Evening Post in 2002, Long became the inaugural editor of The Dominion Post. He left the new newspaper within months to become chief of staff for New Zealand National Party leaders Bill English and Don Brash.

Long worked in the parliamentary press gallery for over 20 years, which included writing a series questioning the Think Big economic strategy of the government. The articles led Prime Minister Rob Muldoon to bar all Dominion reporters from his press conferences.

As of 2011 he writes a political column "The Long View" for The Dominion Post.

In the 2011 New Year Honours, Long was appointed an Officer of the New Zealand Order of Merit for services to journalism.
