= Sunday News (New Zealand) =

Tabloid newspaper in New Zealand

- Type: Sunday newspaper
- Format: Tabloid
- Owner(s): Stuff
- Editor: Chris Baldock
- Founded: 1961
- Ceased publication: 2024
- Headquarters: Auckland, New Zealand
- Website: sundaynews.co.nz

The Sunday News was a New Zealand tabloid newspaper published each weekend in Auckland. In addition to a self-described 'punchy' take on the news, it featured coverage of weekend sport, entertainment, star gossip, fashion and TV listings.

The Sunday News was first launched in 1961. It was owned by media business Stuff Ltd, formerly the New Zealand branch of Australian media company Fairfax Media.

On 30 June, Stuff announced that the Sunday News would be closed by 28 July 2024.
