= Greg Hywood =

Australian journalist, editor and media executive (born 1954)

- Born: Gregory Colin Hywood; 26 September 1954 (age 72); Melbourne, Australia
- Education: Monash University
- Occupations: Journalist, editor, chief executive
- Employer: Fairfax Media

Gregory Colin Hywood (born 26 September 1954) is an Australian journalist, editor and media executive who was CEO of Fairfax Media, one of Australia's largest media organisations, from 2010 to 2018.

== Career ==
=== Early journalism ===
Gregory Hywood graduated with an economics degree from Monash University in Victoria in 1975, and was working as an economist for automotive manufacturer Holden when he was hired as a cadet journalist by then-editor of the Melbourne bureau of the Fairfax-owned national business newspaper Australian Financial Review, Trevor Sykes. Hywood reported on business and both domestic and foreign politics for the AFR for nearly 17 years, winning a Walkley Award in 1980 for a story he broke about the internal operations of Holden.

In the early 1990s, Hywood was made editor of the Australian Financial Review and then promoted to publisher and editor-in-chief of the paper. He was then moved within the Fairfax organisation to become publisher and editor-in-chief of The Sydney Morning Herald and Sun Herald, and then publisher and editor-in-chief of The Age.

In 2003, Hywood left Fairfax for a position as Executive Director Policy and Cabinet in the Victorian Government's Department of the Premier for Steve Bracks, his resignation rumoured to be due to a falling-out with then-CEO Fred Hilmer over Fairfax's internet strategy. Hywood was appointed CEO of Tourism Victoria in 2006 and in 2008, he concurrently held the position of Deputy Secretary (Brand, Communications and Tourism) at the Department of Innovation, Industry and Regional Development. In recent years he has held board positions on the Tourism and Transport Forum, the Heart Foundation, the Victorian Major Events Company, and the Deakin University Council.

=== CEO of Fairfax ===
In October 2010, Hywood was appointed an Independent non-executive director of Fairfax Media, and following the sudden resignation of CEO Brian McCarthy in December 2010, appointed interim CEO. By March 2011 Fairfax Media confirmed his appointment as permanent chief executive and managing director.

Hywood made headlines in May 2011 when announcing a plan to outsource key aspects of production, including plans to outsource news sub-editing to the agency Pagemasters, part-owned by Fairfax rival News Limited. His proposal sparked stop-work meetings among journalists at both Fairfax and rival publications, as well as open criticism from the American Copy Editor's Society, with some media commentators arguing that the most likely hope for newspaper survival is maintaining excellent quality, something that cannot be contracted or guaranteed through outsourced sub-editing, according to Australian academic Margaret Simons.

In May 2017, he fronted a Senate inquiry into journalism, at which point he was still CEO of Fairfax. He was asked questions about "job cuts, a week-long strike by staff and a $2.7bn offer to buy the company."

Hywood left Fairfax Media following the merger with the Nine Entertainment Co. in 2018.

=== Later career ===
In October 2020 Hywood was appointed chair of Free TV, a role that had remained vacant since the resignation of Harold Mitchell in 2018.
