= Samantha Hayes =

New Zealand newsreader (born 1984)

Sam Hayes
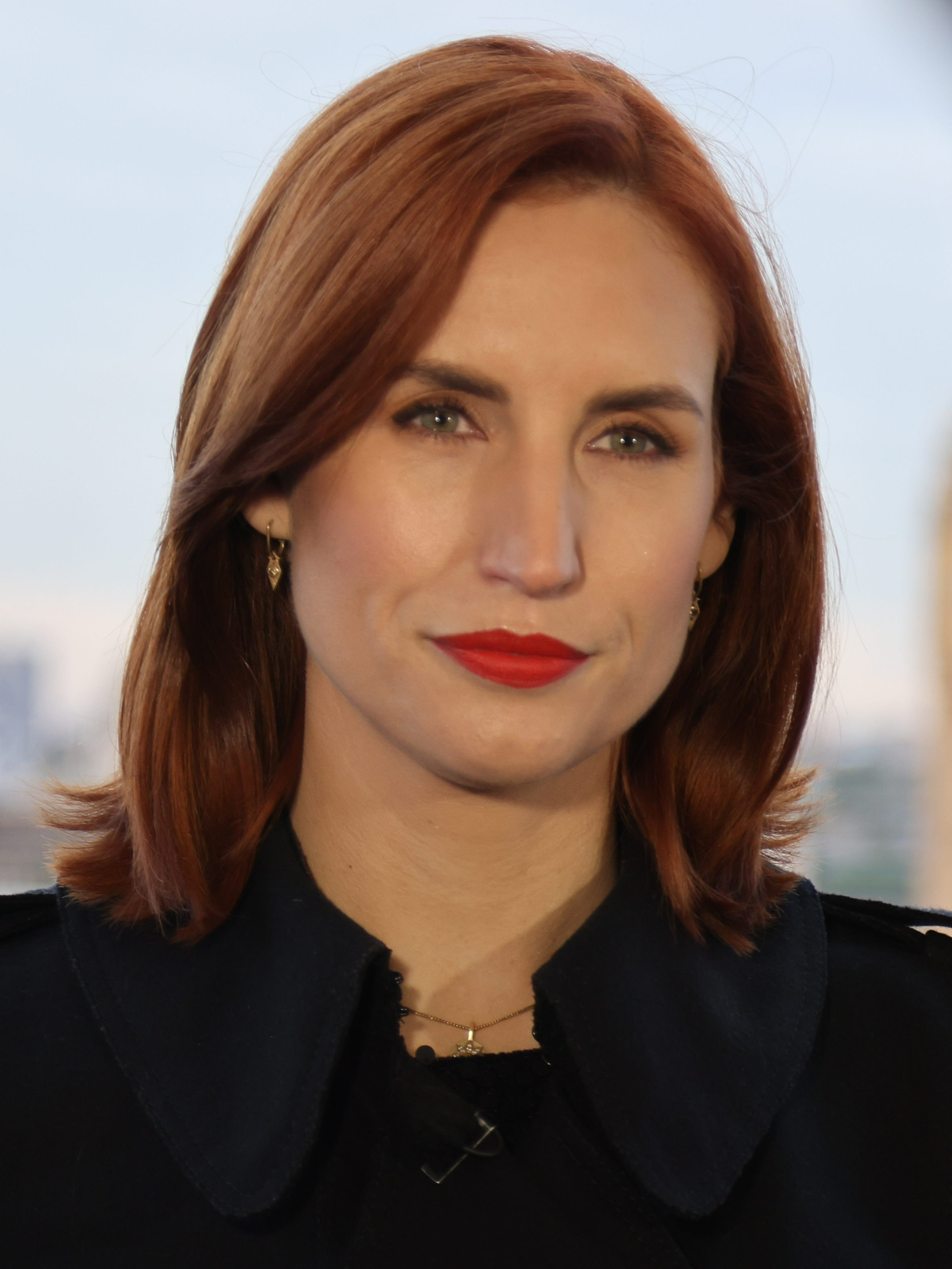
- Hayes in 2022 during the Queen's funeral
- Born: Samantha Hayes; 25 April 1984 (age 42); Pietermaritzburg, Natal, South Africa
- Education: University of Otago (BA)
- Occupation: Journalist
- Known for: Newshub Live at 6pm ThreeNews
- Relatives: Sir Richard Hayes (uncle)

Samantha Hayes (born 25 April 1984) is a New Zealand journalist and newsreader, best known for co-anchoring Newshub Live at 6pm from 2016 until 2024, and subsequently becoming the sole weekday anchor for the successor bulletin ThreeNews.

== Early life ==
Hayes was born in Pietermaritzburg, South Africa, to a New Zealand father and a South African mother. The family relocated to Milton in Otago, New Zealand, when she was six months old. She has a younger sister and an older brother.

She received her education at Tokomairiro High School. She began tertiary education at the University of Otago and finished her degree, a Bachelor of Arts in media studies and international relations, at Victoria University of Wellington in 2007.

Hayes played representative netball for South Otago while at high school and competed in dressage, showjumping and eventing.

== Career ==
Hayes has worked in the media industry as a broadcast journalist and news anchor in New Zealand since 2001.

Hayes first appeared at TV3 aged 17, gaining work experience. During her first week at the programme, she was sent to interview heavy metal band Megadeth and came back with an international scoop when lead singer Dave Mustaine revealed for the first time why he left his previous band Metallica, telling Hayes "I'd like to say I quit, but I got fired because I was a violent drunk".

During her studies at the University of Otago, Hayes worked at the student radio station Radio One 91fm as an on-air DJ, news editor and newsreader. In 2005, Hayes relocated to Wellington and completed her Bachelor of Arts degree at Victoria University of Wellington. Alongside her studies she hosted, produced and announced news on Radio Active 88.6FM, including the midday Sam 60 show and the arts and culture-focused Caffeine and Aspirin.

Alongside broadcasting, Hayes worked as an event organiser for popular cultural events One Love music festival and Handle the Jandal music video competition. Hayes’ appearance in a media interview for the 2006 Handle the Jandal event on TV3's Nightline brought her back into contact with news bosses at TV3, and she was offered a reporting role on Nightline soon after in September 2006.

In 2007, Hayes was offered the full time presenting role on Nightline, for which she moved to Auckland to become New Zealand's youngest-ever newsreader at that time, aged 23. She has since worked on the programmes Newshub Late, 3rd Degree, Newsworthy and Firstline. She also held an appointment as the network's Australia correspondent based in Sydney.

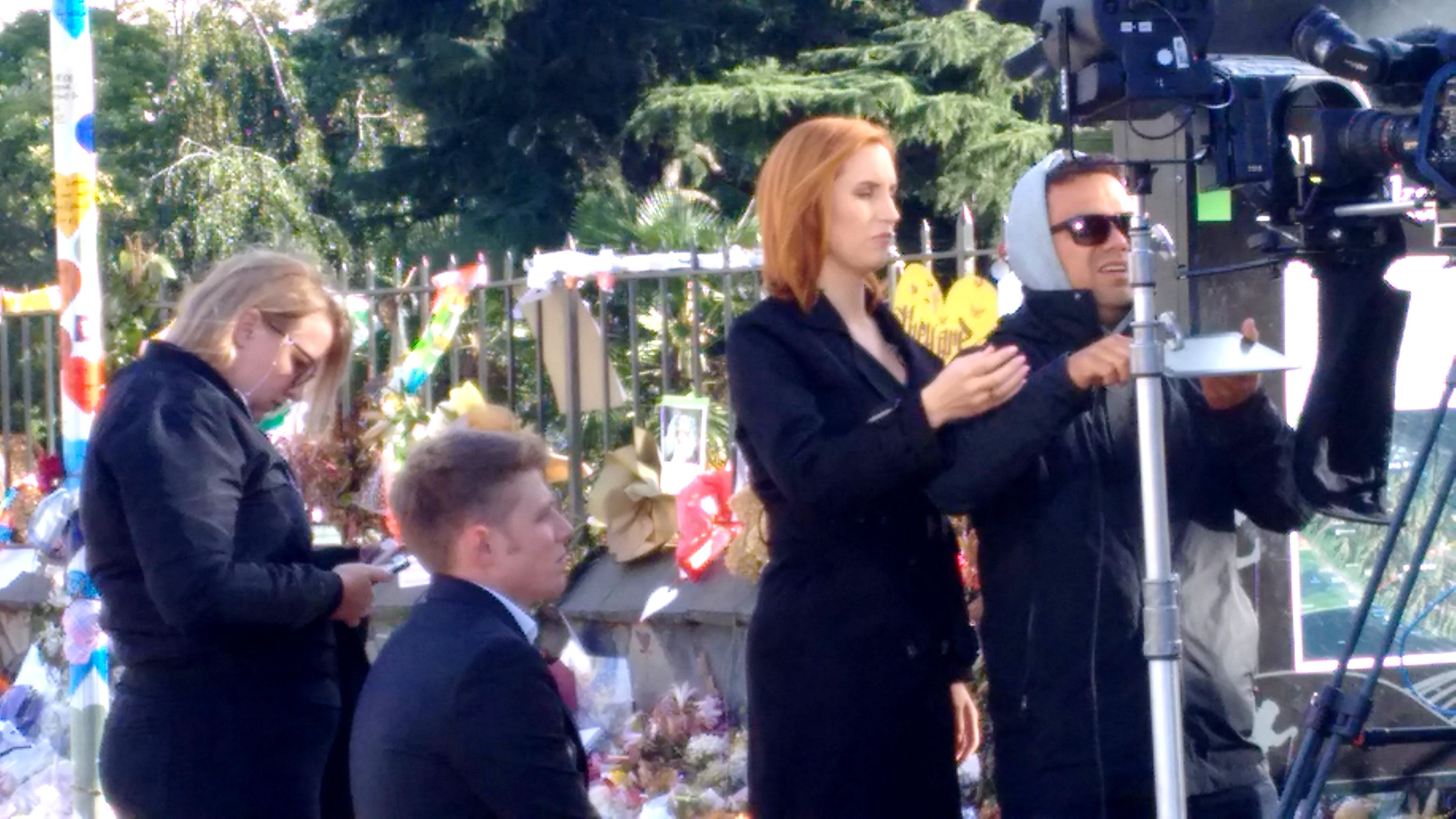
Hayes (middle) preparing to record in 2019

From 30 May 2016, she succeeded Hilary Barry as the co-anchor, alongside Mike McRoberts, of the daily news broadcast Newshub Live at 6pm. Since that time she has also anchored special programmes, including the 2023 New Zealand general election, the 2016 and 2020 United States elections, the wedding of Prince Harry and Meghan Markle, and ten days of live coverage from London after the death of Queen Elizabeth II in 2022.

Hayes' reporting has included the documentary series Newshub Investigates: Generation Covid investigating the long-term impact of the COVID-19 lockdowns on babies and children, and investigating Gisborne's deadly problem with forestry slash washing downstream and onto beaches for Paddy Gower Has Issues. She was one of the first reporters to cover the emergence of international music star Lorde when the latter was 16 years old, and has reported from Antarctica and Kenya's Masai Mara Game Reserve.

After the production of Three's 6pm news bulletin was transferred to Stuff in 2024, Hayes and six other former Newshub journalists were recruited into Stuff's replacement programme, ThreeNews, with Hayes as the sole weekday anchor.

== Other media and public roles ==
In July 2018, Hayes won series 7 of the New Zealand version of Dancing with the Stars with her professional partner Aaron Gilmore. The victory raised over $120,000 for the charity New Zealand Riding for the Disabled, for which she later became an ambassador.

Hayes is an event compere and speaker, hosting events such as the annual New Zealand Business Hall of Fame Gala Dinner (2016–19, 2021–22), the New Zealand Hi Tech Awards (2021), An Evening with Sir Richard Branson (2017), Kea World Class Awards (2015), Air New Zealand Sustainability Breakfast (2018), and Auckland University of Technology Excellence Awards (2018, 2021, 2022).

Hayes is on the New Zealand board of the Australasian charity So They Can.

== Personal life ==
Hayes has been a vegetarian since she was 11 years old for ethical reasons.

Hayes has two children, born in 2019 and 2021, with former partner Jeroen Blaauw. Hayes suffered pre-eclampsia during her first pregnancy, leading to caesarean section. In November 2023, Hayes announced on Instagram that she and Blaauw had ended their relationship.

Hayes is a recreational mountain climber, including completing ascents of Ruapehu and Taranaki in New Zealand, and Aconcagua in Argentina. She has also completed the Kenya Half Marathon in the Masai Mara and Waitomo Trail Run in New Zealand.

Hayes is the niece of helicopter pilot Sir Richard Hayes, former chief executive of Southern Lakes Helicopters, who is known for prominent search and rescue operations.
