= The Timaru Herald =

New Zealand newspaper (1864–present)

- Type: Daily newspaper
- Format: Tabloid
- Owner: Stuff Ltd
- Editor: Brooke Black
- Founded: 1864
- Headquarters: Timaru, New Zealand
- Circulation: 14,500
- ISSN: 1170-0920
- Website: www.thepress.co.nz/timaru

The Timaru Herald is a daily provincial newspaper serving the Timaru, South Canterbury and North Otago districts of New Zealand. The current audited daily circulation is about 14,500 copies, with a readership of about 31,000 people. The paper is owned by media company Stuff Ltd.

== History ==
The Timaru Herald was first founded by Thames Advertiser co-owner Alfred G. Horton in 1864. In 1872, he sold the newspaper to fund a lengthy visit to England. Initially it appeared as a weekly paper, and then in bi- and tri-weekly form, before eventually becoming a daily morning paper from 1875.

By the mid–1870s, the Timaru Herald had become the dominant newspaper in Timaru with its main rival being the South Canterbury Times. In early 1876, the newspaper launched a weekly newspaper, which was later renamed the Geraldine County Chronicle in 1879. The Chronicle ceased publication in late 1884.

By 1885, the journalist T. Triggs worked as an editor for The Herald. When the newspaper was sold in 1886, he left to work for the Christchurch–based The Press. In 1887, the former businessman and mayor Edward G. Kerr acquired the Timaru Herald, bringing both the Herald and South Canterbury Times under his ownership.

The Herald has a history of technical innovation within the New Zealand newspaper industry. At the beginning of the 20th century, it became one of the first New Zealand daily papers to replace hand-composed type with Linotype setting. In 1914 the company began New Zealand's first daily rural mail and newspaper delivery service.

In 1918, the Timaru Herald acquired the North Otago Times, which it managed until 1930. For a brief period in the 1920s the Herald was edited by John Hardcastle. He was a journalist with the Herald for about 40 years, but he was also a very keen amateur scientist who has subsequently gained fame for his studies on loess and is now seen as a significant pioneer in the study of palaeoclimatology.

In 1928, the Timaru Herald's Sophia Street building was expanded. In 1954, a new press room and paper store were built at the rear of the building. The newspaper's Crabtree rotary press was commissioned on 2 October 1954. By 1957 the Timaru Herald was offering two-colour printing.

In 1988 the paper introduced direct copy entry by journalists. During the late 1980s it was the first newspaper in the South Pacific to employ fully computerised page layout and production systems.

In 1993, Independent Newspapers Limited bought the Timaru Herald as part of its acquisition of several New Zealand newspapers during the 1980s and 1990s. In July 2003, Independent Newspapers sold its publishing assets to the Fairfax Media group in Australia.

In 2005 printing moved to Guardian Print, of Ashburton. In April 2013 printing moved to Fairfax Print & Logistics in Christchurch.

Since 30 April 2018, it is published six days a week, Monday to Friday in a tabloid format, and on Saturdays in a broadsheet format, with full process colour printing. It was previously printed in a broadsheet format on Monday to Friday.

== Community newspapers ==
The South Canterbury Herald (formerly the High Country Herald) is a weekly newspaper, delivered on Wednesdays. It is free to residents and can be viewed free at the Fairfax Media Digital Edition website (under Select Title). It is distributed to Timaru, Temuka, Geraldine, Waimate, Pleasant Point, Albury, Fairlie, Lake Tekapo, Ohau, Twizel, Mount Cook and rural mail deliveries in these areas.

The Waitaki Herald is a bi-weekly newspaper, delivered on Wednesdays and Fridays to Oamaru, Kurow, Omarama, Otematata, Maheno, Hampden, Herbert, Moeraki, Palmerston and rural mail deliveries in these areas.
