= 1 Denison Street =

Skyscraper in North Sydney, Australia

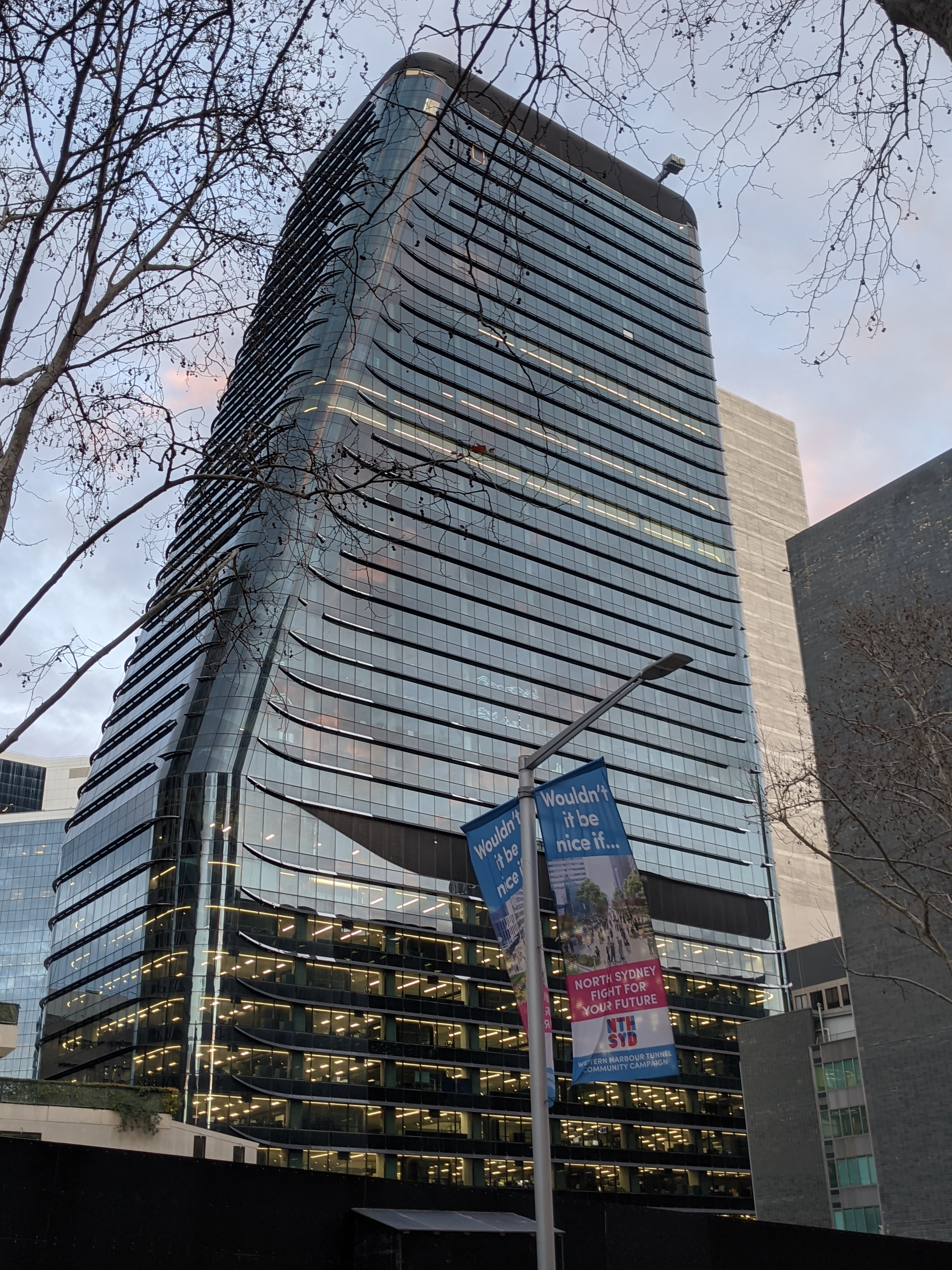
- Interactive map of the 1 Denison Street area

General information
- Type: Commercial
- Location: North Sydney, New South Wales, Australia
- Coordinates: 33.838131°S 151.208183°E
- Construction started: 2017
- Opening: 2020

Height
- Height: 159 metres (522 ft)

Technical details
- Floor count: 37
- Floor area: 61,600 sqm

Design and construction
- Architecture firm: Bates Smart
- Developer: Winten Property Group

1 Denison Street is a skyscraper in North Sydney, Australia. Designed by Bates Smart, the tower stands at a height of 159 metres (37 floors), making it the second-tallest building in the North Sydney CBD.

== History ==
Construction works of the building, built by real estate developer Winten Property Group and designed by architecture firm Bates Smart, began in 2017 and were completed in 2020.

The conclusion of the works marked the arrival of tenants in the building, including SAP, Nine Entertainment and Microsoft.
