= The Southland Times =

Newspaper in New Zealand

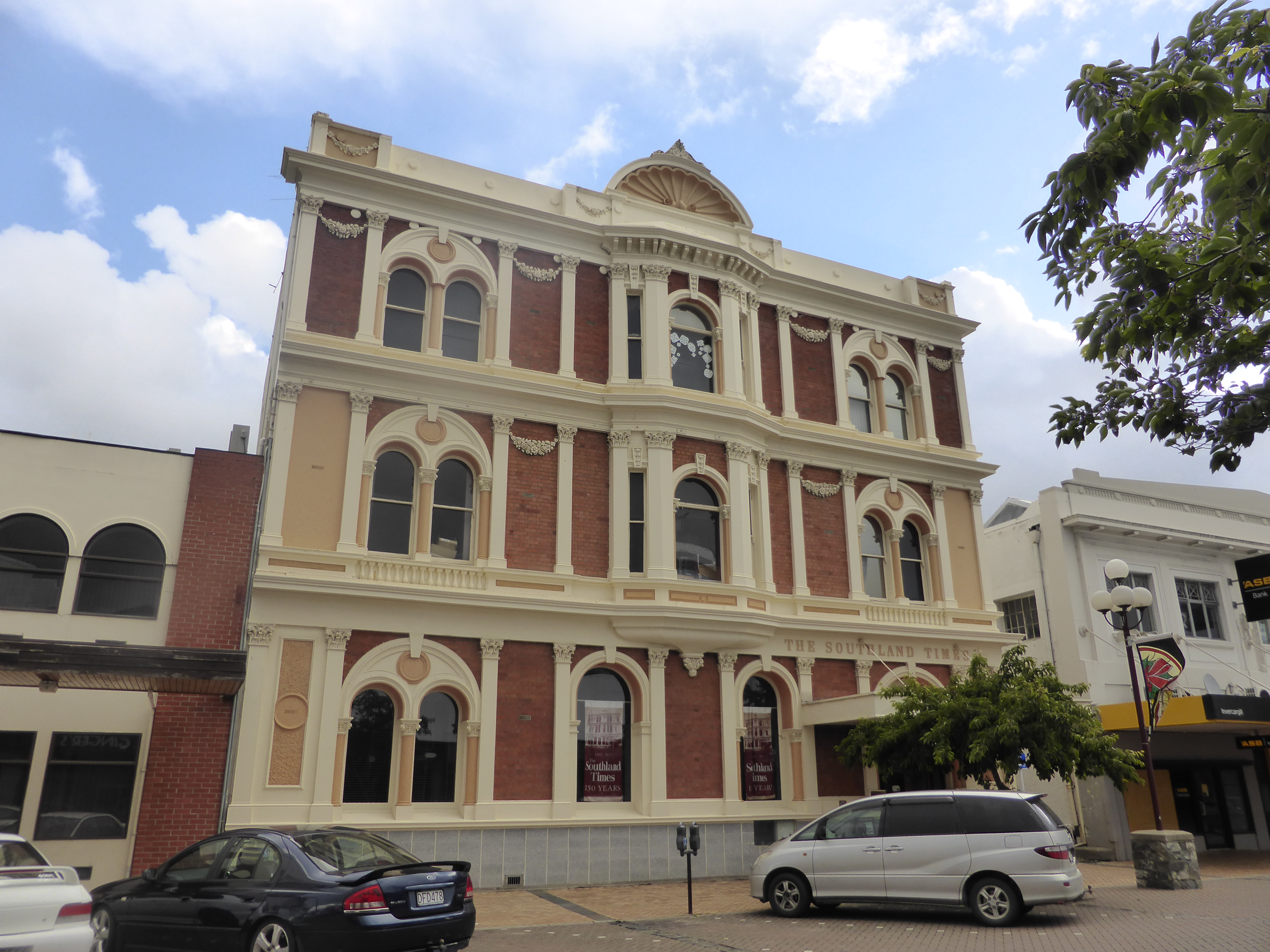
- The former Southland Times building
- Type: Daily (except Sunday) Newspaper
- Format: Tabloid
- Owner: Stuff Ltd
- Editor: Natasha Holland
- Founded: 1862
- Headquarters: Invercargill, New Zealand
- Circulation: 23, 231
- ISSN: 0112-9910
- Website: www.thepress.co.nz/southland

The Southland Times is the regional daily paper for Southland, including Invercargill, and neighbouring parts of Otago, in New Zealand. It is now owned by media business Stuff Ltd, formerly the New Zealand division of Fairfax Media.

== History ==
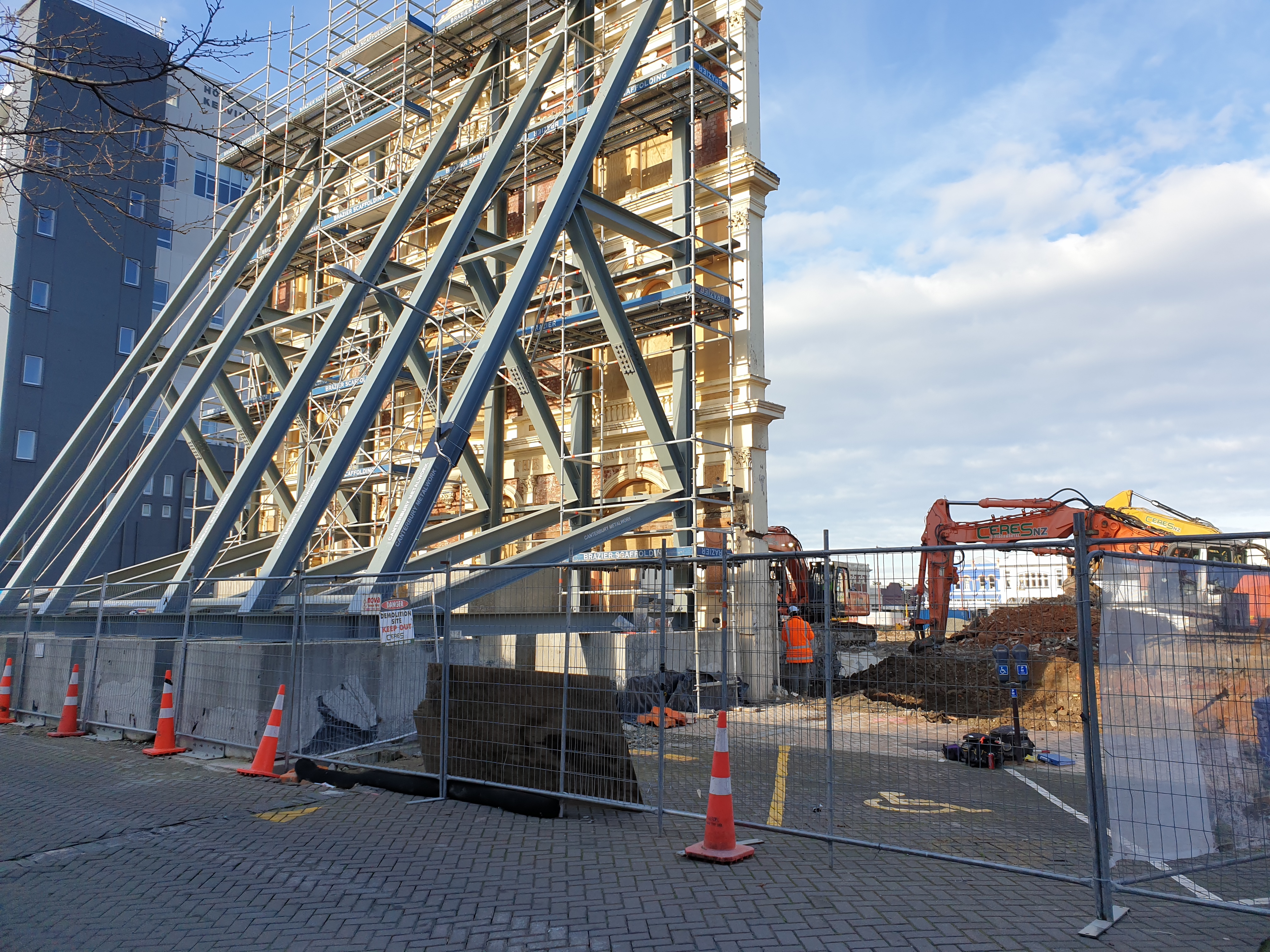
Demolition of The Southland Times building in 2020 with the facade retained

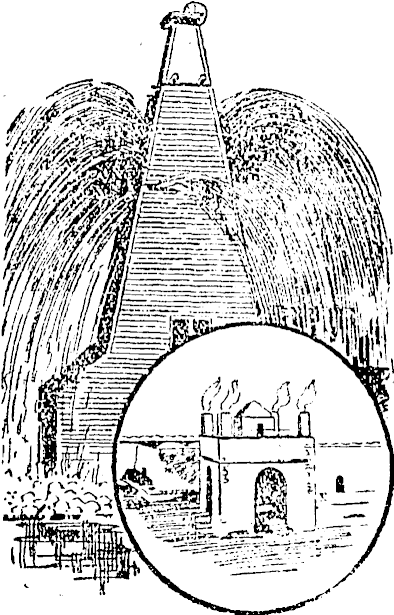
One of the Baku (Southland Times, 7 November 1903)

The Southland Times was first established in 1862. The first edition was published on 12 November 1862 under the title of Invercargill Times. The three founders were Gerard George Fitzgerald, John T. Downes, and Charles Reynolds. The name changed to The Southland Times in June 1864. Initially, it was published two or three times a week until it became a daily paper in 1875. From 1869 until its purchase by the INL (Independent Newspapers Limited), it was owned by the Gilmour family. Robert Gilmour became a part owner in 1869–70, and then in 1879 became the sole owner of the paper.

In 1972, digital computers and software, phototypesetters, and a Japanese APR photopolymer plate were installed at the paper, making the Times New Zealand's first fully computerised newspaper production system under the direction of Ian Gilmour.

The paper changed hands again on 1 July 2003, when Independent Newspapers Limited was purchased by Australian media company Fairfax Media.

In May 2012 local printing of The Southland Times ceased with all printing now taking place at Allied Press in Dunedin. Smaller community papers that are usually printed once a week are now printed from Christchurch.

In July 2015 The Southland Times building located on Esk Street was sold to the Invercargill Licensing Trust. A year later The Southland Times relocated to a new building on the corner of Don and Deveron Streets. In 2017 the Invercargill City Council and HWR Group formed HWCP Management Limited with the purpose of redeveloping the Invercargill CDB. The Southland Times building and most buildings on the city block surrounding Dee Street, Tay Street, Kelvin Street and Esk Street were purchased by HWCP with the intentions of redeveloping the city block into an inner city mall. Plans for the new mall were first unveiled in 2018 and in 2019 an announcement was made that The Southland Times building would be demolished but the building facade retained, a Farmers department store would be built on The Southland Times building site as the anchor tenant in the mall. The demolition of the city block began in January 2020 and construction began in October 2020. In November 2021 current and former staff from The Southland Times were invited to sign the rear of The Southland Times building facade prior to the facade being plastered. On July 14, 2022, the first stage of the Invercargill Central Mall was opened including the Farmers Department store.

=== Awards and nominations ===
At the 2018 Voyager Media Awards The Southland Times' photographer Kavinda Herath won the Best Photo (Junior) Award.

== Other publications ==
The Southland Times also published:

=== The Invercargill Eye ===
The Invercargill Eye was distributed weekly in the area surrounding Invercargill and Winton.

=== NewsLink ===
NewsLink was distributed weekly in the area surrounding Gore and Eastern Southland.

=== The Queenstown Mirror ===
The Queenstown Mirror was published weekly on Wednesdays in two editions: one for the Queenstown Lakes District and another for Central Otago.

=== Otago Southland Farmer ===
The Otago Southland Farmer was delivered fortnightly to all rural homes in Southland and Otago.

=== Auto Xtra ===
Auto Xtra was an A4 glossy car publication, published fortnightly on a Monday, inserted into The Southland Times, and distributed to retail outlets in Invercargill.

Fairfax announced in 2018 that it would close or sell these publications.

=== D-Scene ===
In 2008, The Southland Times launched a subsidiary weekly community newspaper in Dunedin called D-Scene. On 10 May 2013, Fairfax Media announced a proposal to close down the weekly newspaper, affecting eight full-time and part-time staff. The Southland Times general manager Sue Gregory confirmed that staff would be consulted over a two-week period. On 29 May 2013, Fairfax Media confirmed the closure of D-Scene.
