= ThreeNews =

New Zealand TV news programme

- Based on: 3 News
- Presented by: Samantha Hayes (weeknights); Imogen Wells (weekends)
- Country of origin: New Zealand

Production
- Camera setup: Multi-camera
- Running time: 60 minutes (weeknights); 30 minutes (weekends); (all including advertisements)
- Production company: Stuff

Original release
- Network: Three
- Release: 6 July 2024 – present

ThreeNews is a New Zealand television news bulletin produced by Stuff, airing on channel Three since 6 July 2024. It is the successor to Newshub Live at 6pm, which ended the day prior.

== Format ==
ThreeNews is broadcast for 60 minutes on weekdays and 30 minutes on weekends. Notable presenters include weeknight news presenter Samantha Hayes, weekend news presenter Imogen Wells and sports presenter Ollie Ritchie.

== History ==
=== Background ===
The recession of the 2020s and a decline in advertising revenue caused a drop in Newshub's revenue. Consequently, several Newshub bulletins and the current affairs programme The Project had to be shut down. After making a proposal in February 2024, Warner Bros. Discovery New Zealand decided in April that it would close its news division, Newshub, which would result in around 200 job losses.

=== Succeeding Newshub ===
In April 2024, Stuff announced that they will replace Newshub's spot for the 6 pm news bulletin on Three. The name ThreeNews was unveiled the following month, which reflects the channel the programme is run on, and is a reference to Newshub’s previous name, 3 News. On 14 April 2024, Warner Bros. Discovery filed a trademark claim for the names ThreeNews and Three News while Stuff filed a trademark with the New Zealand Intellectual Properties Office.

Several of the top journalists from Newshub are employed at ThreeNews, including newsreader Samantha Hayes, Laura Tupou, Ollie Ritchie and Heather Keats. The news bulletin launched on 6 July 2024.

On 26 July, the weather segment of ThreeNews' bulletin was briefly interrupted by "technical difficulties," which Warner Bros Discovery attributed to human error.

In December 2024, ThreeNews was reorganised under the Stuff Digital umbrella, a division that also includes the social media platform Neighbourly and the website stuff.co.nz. In June 2025, online retailer Trade Me acquired a 50 percent stake in Stuff Digital and its assets including ThreeNews.

In late July 2025, Sky confirmed plans to buy Warner Bros. Discovery New Zealand's assets including Three and ThreeNow. Stuff's owner Sinead Boucher and Sky CEO Sophie Moloney confirmed that Sky would honour Stuff's contract with Warner Discovery to produce the ThreeNews evening bulletin.

"Mini debates" were added in 2026, announced at Sky's February upfront.

== List of presenters ==
=== Current ===
- Samantha Hayes (weeknights, 2024–present)
- Imogen Wells (weekend, 2025–present)

=== Former ===
==== Weekend ====
- Laura Tupou (2024–2025)

== Reception ==
ThreeNews debuted to strong ratings for its inaugural Saturday and Sunday shows on 6-7 July 2024. Audience measuring tool Nielsen found that 340,000 people in the 5+ audience had watched the inaugural Saturday half hour bulletin, an 89% increase from Newshub's last Saturday night bulletin on 29 June 2024 and a 32% increase on the same weekend in July 2023. The 6 July news bulletin also 19.3% in the target 25-54 year old demographic, a 3.5% increase on the average rating for the Newshub bulletin over the last quarter. The 7 July news bulletin attracted 300,000 5+ viewers and 18.6% of the 25-25 year old demographic market share. During its launch, Tara Ward of The Spinoff observed that ThreeNews took a more in-depth, investigatory approach to news coverage than its predecessor Newshub's 6 pm news bulletin, which had primarily focused on big headlines, sports and the weather.

By early August 2024, ThreeNews had been losing ratings, primarily during the 2024 Summer Olympics, which had been carried by competing broadcaster TVNZ. The ratings of the ThreeNews bulletin fell sharply compared to what it was at the beginning, with rival 1News rising in the process. On 20 October 2024, ThreeNews was watched by 26,300 viewers while 1 News was watched by six times as many viewers. By mid-November 2024, ThreeNews had 46,200 linear views in the 25-54 demographic compared to TVNZ's 122,600 within that demographic.

== Controversy ==
=== Broadcasting standards breaches ===
In March 2025, the Broadcasting Standards Authority (BSA) upheld two complaints by Action for Smokefree 2025 (ASH) against ThreeNews broadcasts aired on 26 and 30 July 2024. The Authority found the reports breached fairness, balance, and accuracy standards by misrepresenting ASH’s position on vaping and omitting key contextual information. The first item, presented as a 'special investigation,' unfairly implied links between ASH and the pro-vaping lobby in Australia, while the second misleadingly reported that a school had recently opted out of an ASH youth survey based on outdated concerns. The BSA ordered a public broadcast statement, online corrections, $1,710.62 in costs to ASH, and $3,000 in costs to the Crown.
