= Stuff (company) =

New Zealand news media company

Stuff Limited
- Trade name: Stuff
- Formerly: Fairfax New Zealand
- Type: Private
- Industry: Publishing
- Founded: 1 July 2003; 23 years ago
- Headquarters: Wellington, New Zealand
- Key people: Sinead Boucher (owner)
- Brands: Stuff Digital; ThreeNews; Stuff (website); Neighbourly; Masthead Publishing; The Post; The Press; Waikato Times
- Website: stuff.co.nz

Stuff Limited (previously Fairfax New Zealand) is a privately held news media company operating in New Zealand. It operates Stuff, the country's largest news website, and owns nine daily newspapers, including New Zealand's second and third-highest circulation daily newspapers, The Post and The Press, and the highest circulation weekly, Sunday Star-Times. Magazines published include TV Guide, New Zealand's top-selling weekly magazine. Stuff also owns social media network Neighbourly.

Stuff has been owned by Sinead Boucher since 31 May 2020. It was called Fairfax New Zealand Limited until 1 February 2018. In December 2024, Stuff was restructured into two separate print and digital media divisions: Masthead Publishing and Stuff Digital. In June 2025, online retailer Trade Me acquired a 50 percent stake in Stuff Digital, with Stuff's property section being rebranded as Trade Me Property.

== History ==
=== Fairfax Media, 2003–2018 ===
The print publications and the Stuff website previously belonged to Independent Newspapers Limited, until they were sold to Australian company Fairfax Media in 2003.

When a 7.8 earthquake struck Kaikōura 14 November 2016, cutting the town off via road access, Stuff (then Fairfax New Zealand) flew free copies of its newspapers to residents.

In 2016, Fairfax New Zealand and media company New Zealand Media and Entertainment (NZME) sought clearance from the Commerce Commission to merge their operations in New Zealand. As part of the merger proposal, Stuff's Australian owner Fairfax Media would have received a 41 per cent stake in the combined business plus $55 million cash. On 2 May 2017, the Commerce Commission declined to approve the merger. Stuff Ltd. and NZME appealed the Commission's decision to the Wellington High Court, which upheld the Commission's decision on 18 December 2017. In June 2018, the companies appealed the Commission's decision at the New Zealand Court of Appeal, which rejected their merger bid on 25 September 2018. In October 2018, Stuff and NZME abandoned their first merger attempt.

On 1 February 2018, Fairfax New Zealand Limited changed its name to Stuff Limited.

=== Nine Entertainment, 2018–2020 ===
In July 2018, Stuff's parent company Fairfax Media merged with Australia's Nine Entertainment, which acquired Stuff and its stable of New Zealand newspapers. In July 2019, Nine Entertainment attempted to sell Stuff but did not receive any adequate bids.

In November 2019, NZME confirmed that it had entered into negotiations with Nine Entertainment to purchase Stuff and submitted a proposal to the New Zealand Government regarding a "possible transaction." NZME proposed a "Kiwishare" arrangement that would ringfence Stuff's editorial operations and protect local journalism.

On 11 May 2020, NZME offered to purchase Stuff for a symbolic $1 on the basis of saving jobs during the COVID-19 pandemic. In response, Stuff's parent company Nine Entertainment terminated further discussion with NZME. In response, NZME filed for an emergency injunction at the Auckland High Court to force Nine Entertainment back into negotiations. On 19 May, the Auckland High Court rejected NZME's bid for an interim injunction against Nine Entertainment.

=== Sinead Boucher, 2020–present ===
On 25 May, Nine Entertainment agreed to sell Stuff to Stuff's chief executive Sinead Boucher for NZ$1, with the transaction due to be completed by 31 May. This marked the return of the company into New Zealand ownership. Nine retained all of the proceeds of the sale of wholesale broadband business Stuff Fibre to telecommunications company Vocus Group, and ownership of Stuff's Wellington printing press.

In later-released court filings, it was revealed Nine had decided it would shut down Stuff if a merger or sale had not proceeded by 31 May.

==== 2022 news team restructuring ====
On 18 October 2022, Stuff released details of a proposed restructure for its regional and local publications. Under the proposal, the number of newsroom staff at the Manawatū Standard, Nelson Mail, and Timaru Herald would be reduced from seven reporters to three. Other regional newspapers Taranaki Daily News and The Southland Times would retain four reporters each. In addition, news director roles at regional papers would be disestablished, with the remaining editors expected to write news. Stuff has proposed counterbalancing these job cuts by establishing a new regional team composed of a group regional editor, four news directors and nine breaking news reporters. According to Radio New Zealand, several unidentified Stuff employees expressed sadness and unease about the restructuring and increased work load.

In response to the proposed restructuring, several journalists affiliated with the E tū union organised strikes in December 2022. Despite opposition from employees, Stuff proceeded with the planned restructuring in early December 2022. Stuff's Chief Content Officer Joanna Norris defended the restructuring, stating that the company had created an internal news service operating across regional New Zealand that would be able to cover stories at any time and place. By contrast, Mayor of Nelson Nick Smith expressed concern about the impact of job cuts on the quality of local newspaper Nelson Mail's news coverage.

==== Flagship brands' web launch ====
On 27 April 2023, Stuff confirmed that it would launch separate subscription-based websites for three of its newspapers: The Dominion Post, The Press, and Waikato Times. These websites will co-exist with the free Stuff news website. In addition, Stuff confirmed that The Dominion Post would be revamped as The Post from 29 April.

In early October 2024, Stuff Digital's Head of Growth Janine Fenwick confirmed that the Stuff news website would be reorganising its regional news content. Content from the Stuff Group's North Island newspapers Taranaki Daily News, Manawatu Standard and the Wairarapa Times-Age would be hosted on The Post's website while South Island newspapers Southland Times, Nelson Mail, Timaru Herald and Marlborough Express would be hosted on The Press's website. Users would also be prompted to subscribe to a single subscription package offering unlimited access to content on The Post, The Press and Waikato Times websites.

==== 2024 developments ====
On 16 April 2024, Stuff announced an agreement with Warner Bros. Discovery to replace the outgoing Newshub news service with an evening news bulletin provided by Stuff from 6 July 2024. The news bulletin will run from 6pm to 7pm on weekdays and a 30 minute news bulletin on Saturday and Sunday. As part of the agreement, Warner Bros. Discovery will pay Stuff an annual fee, estimated to be likely in the millions. Stuff publisher Boucher also confirmed that Stuff would hire several former Newshub staff (less than 40–50) to produce the 6pm bulletins.

On 7 May 2024, Stuff confirmed that it would hire seven former Newshub journalists—Samantha Hayes, Jenna Lynch, Laura Tupou, Ollie Ritchie, Juliet Speedy, Zane Small and Heather Keats—to produce its 6pm news bulletin and other news products. In late May 2024, Stuff revealed that the new 6pm news bulletin would be called ThreeNews.

On 15 May 2024, the Stuff Group acquired the Wairarapa Times-Age newspaper, its website and associated publications from National Media Limited.

In mid-June 2024, the Stuff Group announced that a new community newspaper called The Waikato Local Te Pūtahi would be launched in the Waikato Region on 3 July. This newspaper replaced several defunct Stuff community newspapers including the Piako Post, Matamata Chronicle, South Waikato News and the Hamilton Press. The Waikato Local was also distributed in Te Aroha and Tīrau.

In December 2024, The Spinoff website reported that Stuff would be restructured into two divisions: Stuff Digital and Masthead Publishing. Stuff Digital was given oversight over stuff.co.nz, Neighbourly and its audio and video divisions. Masthead Publishing was given responsibility over the company's newspaper brands and their websites particularly The Post, The Press and Waikato Times. In late March 2025, The New Zealand Herald reported that Stuff had threatened to pursue a defamation lawsuit against The Spinoff for covering the restructuring.

==== 2025-26 developments ====
On 21 March, NZME confirmed it had entered into negotiations with Stuff in late 2024 to acquire several of its Wellington and South Island newspapers in order to boost its OneRoof business revenue and audience. However, Stuff had paused these talks in response to Canadian billionaire Jim Grenon's bid to replace NZME's current leadership board during a shareholder meeting scheduled for 29 April 2025.

On 25 March, retail website Trade Me CEO Anders Skoe confirmed that his company and Stuff had been discussing content sharing and other unspecified collaborations. On 3 June, Trade Me acquired a 50 percent stake in the Stuff Digital division, whose assets include the website Stuff and the evening news bulletin ThreeNews. In addition, Stuff's property section will be rebranded as Trade Me Property, with listings, advertisements and some content shared across both platforms.

On 19 August 2025, unionised employees of Stuff affiliated with the E tū union voted to strike to protest their employer's plan to split their collective bargaining agreement into two agreements, reflecting the company's split into separate digital and print divisions.

In late March 2026, Stuff announced plans to close down its Petone printing press in 2027, affecting about 30 jobs.

== Management ==
Allen Williams was chief executive officer of Fairfax New Zealand Limited from April 2009 until April 2013, when he was promoted to managing director of Australian Publishing Media. Andrew Boyle was acting managing director until Simon Tong started as managing director in September 2013. Tong left in March 2017, just days prior to the Commerce Commission announcing their final decision on the proposed Fairfax New Zealand merger with New Zealand Media and Entertainment (NZME). Tong was succeeded by Boyle as acting managing director until Sinead Boucher was appointed chief executive officer in August 2017. Boucher had first been employed by Fairfax as a branch office reporter for The Press in 1993.

On 25 May 2020, Boucher assumed ownership of Stuff from its Australian parent company Nine Entertainment.

On 1 June 2023, Laura Maxwell was appointed as the new Chief Executive of the Stuff Group while its owner Boucher became the Executive Chair and Publisher of the company. In addition, Stuff appointed three new managing directors to lead the major divisions of the company. Chief Audio Officer Nadia Tolich was appointed managing director of Stuff Digital, which included stuff.co.nz, Neighbourly, and Stuff's audio division. Chief content officer Joanna Norris was appointed as managing director of Stuff Masthead Publishing, which has oversight over Stuff's metropolitan, regional and community newspapers, magazines, websites, and commercial printing operations. Executive Commercial Director Matt Headland was appointed as managing director of Stuff Brand Connections, which also incorporated the company's former Stuff Events business division. As part of the restructuring process, Stuff announced a proposed restructuring of editorial and management jobs in mid June 2023. According to Radio New Zealand, several senior journalists were asked to reapply for several new roles including a single position as editor of the Sunday Star Times and The Post newspapers.

== Masthead Publishing ==
Masthead Publishing consists of the company's newspaper brands and their websites particularly The Post, The Press and Waikato Times.

=== Major mastheads ===
- Sunday Star-Times
- The Post
- The Press
- Waikato Times

=== Regional ===
- Manawatu Standard
- Marlborough Express
- The Nelson Mail
- The Southland Times
- Taranaki Daily News
- The Timaru Herald
- Wairarapa Times-Age

=== Community newspapers ===
- The Waikato Local Te Pūtahi
- Wairarapa Midweek

=== Magazines ===
- NZ House & Garden
- NZ Gardener
- TV Guide

== Stuff Digital ==
Stuff Digital consists of stuff.co.nz, Neighbourly, the evening bulletin ThreeNews and its audio and video divisions.

=== Neighbourly ===
In November 2017 Stuff Ltd took full ownership of hyper-local social media network Neighbourly, having first bought a 22.5 percent stake in December 2014.

=== Stuff Circuit ===
In 2019, Stuff launched a longform journalism documentary series called Stuff Circuit with funding from NZ On Air. Notable titles have included Big Decision (abortion law reform), Life + Limb (New Zealand's military involvement in the War in Afghanistan), False Profit (which focused on conspiracy theorist and New Zealand Public Party founder Billy Te Kahika), Deleted (which looked at New Zealand companies alleged to be complicit in human rights abuses in Xinjiang), Disordered (which focused on the treatment of people with Foetal Alcohol Syndrome), and Fire and Fury (which looked at vaccine disinformation and conspiracy theories in the wake of the 2022 Wellington protests.

== Former assets ==
=== Former print assets ===
Stuff has closed or sold many of their former publications:

- Admire Marlborough
- Admire Nelson
- Auckland City Harbour News
- Auto Xtra
- Avenues
- The Bay Chronicle
- Cambridge Edition
- Canterbury Farmer
- Central District Farmer
- Central Leader
- Christchurch Mail
- Clutha Leader
- D-Scene
- Dargaville & District News
- Discover Magazine
- East & Bays Courier
- Eastern Courier
- Far North Real Estate
- Feilding Rangitīkei Herald
- Franklin County News
- Hamilton Press
- Hastings Mail
- Horowhenua Mail
- The Hutt News
- Invercargill Eye
- Kaikoura Star
- Kapi-Mana News
- Kapiti Observer
- Manukau and Papakura Courier
- Matamata Chronicle
- Napier Mail
- The Nelson Tasman Leader
- NewsLink
- Nor-West News
- North Harbour News
- North Shore Times
- North Taranaki Midweek
- North Waikato News
- The Northern News
- Northern Outlook
- NZ Dairy Farmer
- NZ Farmer
- Otago Southland Farmer
- Piako Post
- Queenstown Mirror
- Rodney Times
- Rotorua Review
- Ruapehu Press
- Selwyn and Ashburton Outlook
- South Canterbury Herald
- South Waikato News
- Southern Outlook
- Sunday News
- Taieri Herald
- Taranaki Star
- Taupō Times
- The Tasman Leader
- The Tribune
- Upper Hutt Leader
- Waiheke Marketplace
- Waikato Farmer
- Wairarapa News
- Waitaki Herald
- The Wellingtonian
- The Whangārei Leader

In 2008, Fairfax Media New Zealand launched a weekly community newspaper in Dunedin called D-Scene, which was a subsidiary of The Southland Times. The newspaper ran for five years. On 29 May 2013, Fairfax Media confirmed the closure of D-Scene following a two-week consultation period.

On 25 June 2024, Stuff announced it would close the last of its Northland community newspapers: The Northern News, The Whangārei Leader and Far North Real Estate. The Kerikeri-based Bay Chronicle was closed earlier in March 2024. On 30 June, Stuff announced that its Sunday News newspaper would be closed by late July 2024.

On 2 July 2025, The Press and The New Zealand Herald reported Stuff planned to close up to 15 community newspapers, including the Rodney Times, Central Leader, Eastern Bays Courier, Manukau/Papakura Courier, North Shore Times, Western Leader, Cambridge Edition, Feilding Rangitīkei Herald, Franklin County News, The Hutt News, Kapi Mana News, Nelson and Tasman Leader, Northern Outlook, Taranaki Star and Southern Outlook. These 15 newspapers ceased publishing on 31 July 2025.

=== Former digital assets ===
In May 2018 Stuff Ltd took full ownership of internet service provider Stuff Fibre, which won the People's Choice Award, NZ Broadband Provider of the Year, Best Fibre Broadband Provider, and Best Broadband Innovation at the 2019 Broadband Compare Awards. Stuff Ltd also had a 49 percent share in New Zealand-based energy retailer energyclubnz. On 20 May 2020, Stuff sold Stuff Fibre to Vocus and sold its share of energyclubnz back to its founder.

In 2019, Stuff Ltd launched a video platform, Play Stuff. The website hosts free content sourced from content providers such as BBC, Reuters and the Press Association as well as local content from NZ On Screen and Bravo New Zealand. The platform appears to be defunct as of June 2025.

== Awards ==
Stuff Ltd has won both national and international awards for its corporate leadership and management.

Year	Award	Category	Result
2017	Attitude Awards	Employer Award	Winner
2019	Deloitte Top 200	Diversity and Inclusion Leadership	Finalist
2019	INMA (International News Media Association) Global Media Awards	Best new concept or innovation to create new profit centres	First place
2019	INMA (International News Media Association) Global Media Awards	Best idea to grow advertising sales or retain advertising clients	Second place
2019	INMA (International News Media Association) Global Media Awards	Best idea to encourage print readership or engagement	Third place

== See also ==
- List of print media in New Zealand
- Mass media in New Zealand
