= Western Leader =

Western Leader was a local newspaper in Auckland, New Zealand. It was owned by the media business Stuff Ltd. It ceased operations on 31 July 2025.

== History ==
It was launched in 1963 and was published three times a week. The newspaper operated from the John Henry Centre on Pioneer Street in Henderson, and had a circulation of 77,950 in 2013, an increase of 11,000 over 2010.

In 2019, reporter Torika Tokalau won the Community Journalist of the Year Award at the 2019 Voyager Media Awards.

In early July 2025, Stuff confirmed that it would close down the Western Leader and 14 other North Island community newspapers by 31 July.
