= NZ Gardener =

NZ Gardener is a New Zealand gardening magazine owned by New Zealand media company Stuff Ltd. It is published monthly and has a circulation of 300,000.

It was first published in September 1944; the first issue sold 3,000 copies. Jo McCarroll was appointed editor in 2010, taking over from Lynda Hallinan.

== Awards and nominations ==
Year	Award	Category	Recipient	Result
2019	Magazine Publishers' Association	Newsstand Magazine Excellence Award		Winner
2019	Magazine Publishers' Association	Best Cover – Consumer Special Interest		Winner
2019	Magazine Publishers' Association	Best Magazine – Consumer Special Interest		Winner
2019	Magazine Publishers' Association	Best Journalist - Consumer Special Interest	Mei Leng Wong	Finalist
2018	Magazine Publishers' Association	Best Magazine - Consumer Special Interest		Highly Commended
2017	Magazine Publishers' Association	Best Magazine – Consumer Special Interest		Winner
2017	Magazine Publishers' Association	Editor of the Year - Consumer Special Interest	Jo McCarroll	Winner
2015	Magazine Publishers' Association	Best Retail Subscription Campaign		Finalist
2015	Magazine Publishers' Association	Best Cover - Home & Food		Finalist
2015	Magazine Publishers' Association	Advertising Sales Excellence	Alison Shrigley	Winner
2009	Magazine Publishers' Association	Magazine of the Year		Winner
