= Wairarapa Times-Age =

Regional daily paper in New Zealand

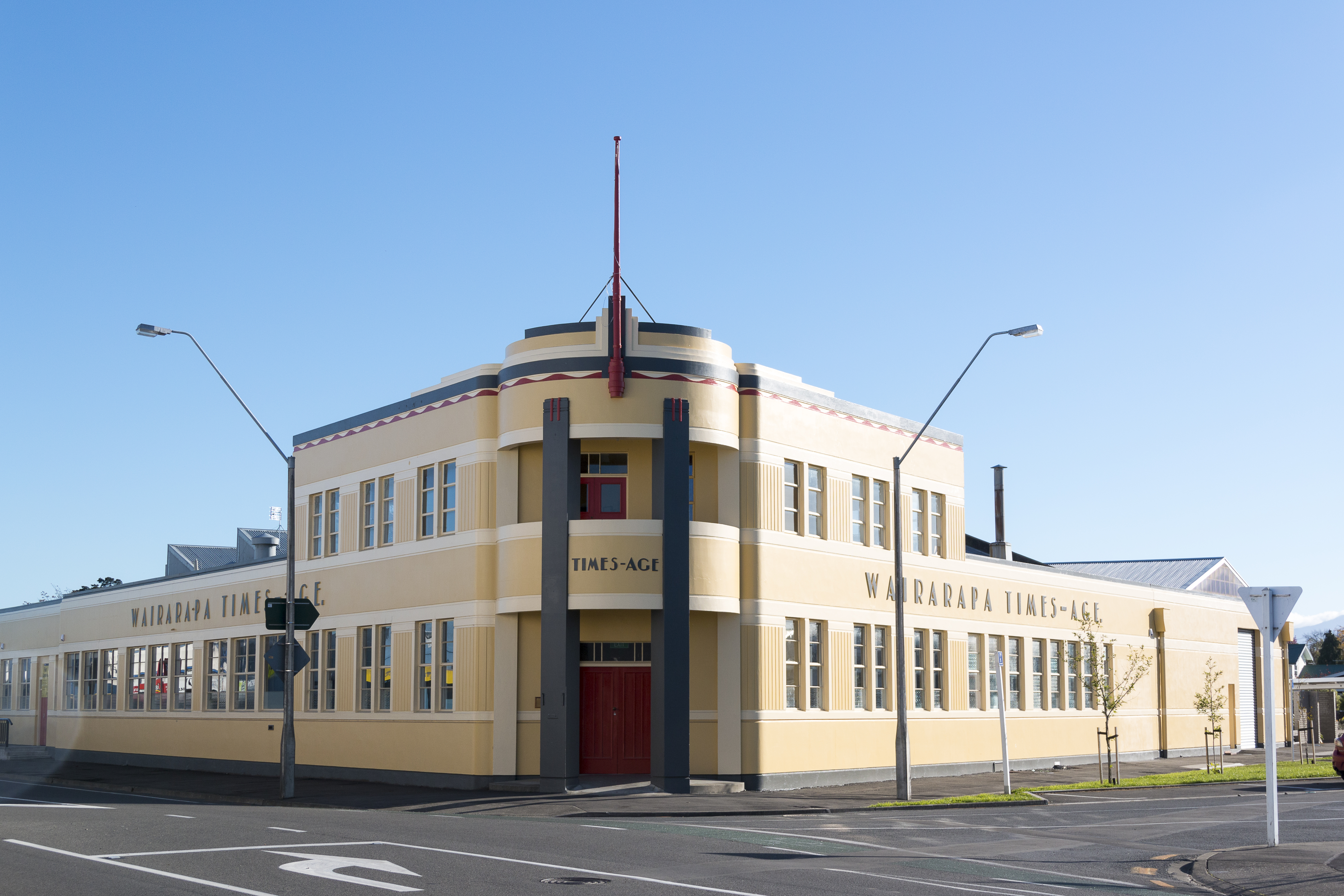
- Art Deco-inspired headquarters in Masterton
- Type: Daily (except Sunday) Newspaper
- Format: Compact
- Owner(s): Stuff
- Founded: 1878
- Headquarters: Masterton, New Zealand
- Circulation: 6,489
- ISSN: 1170-0009
- Website: www.thepost.co.nz/wairarapa

The Wairarapa Times-Age is the regional daily paper for New Zealand's Wairarapa where it is prepared, and published in Masterton.

== History ==
=== Predecessors ===
Of the first newspapers published in the region — the Wairarapa Mercury (later Standard), the Wairarapa News, the Wairarapa Register and the Newsletter — all except the Newsletter were forced to close down by fires in 1937, 1872 and 1878 respectively. However the Wairarapa News began again six years after the fire on 30 October 1878. This paper merged with the Wairarapa Free Press on 11 September 1878 to form the Wairarapa Daily which became the Wairarapa Daily Times in 1892.

The Wairarapa Star was formed in 1881 and changed to the Wairarapa Age in 1902. These two papers, the Daily Times and the Age joined to form the Wairarapa Times-Age in 1938.

=== Modern history, 1938–present ===
The newly merged paper moved to a purpose-built Art Deco-inspired building on the narrow corner of Chapel Street (SH 2) and Cole Street in Masterton. While the Times-Age still has its offices and production team based in its building, the printing of the paper has now been outsourced. In 2006, the building was listed as a Category 2 historic place ("places of historical or cultural heritage significance or value") by the New Zealand Historic Places Trust (now Heritage New Zealand).

The paper was acquired by Wilson & Horton Newspaper group in July 2002. This group was in turn bought up by APN News & Media.

In May 2011 Wairarapa Times-Age, changed the format of its weekend edition and morning edition to a compact size, the Monday to Friday editions remained broadsheet afternoon publications. In November 2011 the newspaper changed all editions to compact sized, morning publications.

On 30 June 2016, NZME sold the Wairarapa Times-Age to Masterton-based National Media Ltd, returning the paper to local ownership.

On 15 May 2024, the Stuff Group acquired the Wairarapa Times-Age along with its website and associated publications from National Media Limited.

== Other publications ==
The Wairarapa Times-Age also publishes:

=== Wairarapa Midweek ===
A weekly community paper that is delivered to homes throughout the Wairarapa District.

=== Wairarapa Property ===
A weekly property magazine inserted into the Wairarapa Midweek.
