= Neighbourly =

New Zealand social network website

Neighbourly is a neighbourhood-based social networking website operating in New Zealand.

== History ==
=== Origins ===
The website was founded by Casey Eden. It was trialed in two Auckland suburbs, St Heliers and Kohimarama, in December 2013, then launched nationally in June 2015.

=== Fairfax-Nine Entertainment ownership, 2017–2020 ===
In December 2014, Fairfax Media New Zealand bought a 22.5 percent stake in the website. In 2017 it acquired the remaining shares. Following changes to Fairfax Media in 2018, the website is now owned by Stuff Ltd.

In 2015, the website was a finalist in the NZI Sustainable Business Network Awards in the Community Impact category.

In February 2018, Neighbourly's parent company Fairfax New Zealand was rebranded as Stuff. In July 2018, the Australian media company Nine Entertainment acquired Fairfax Media and its Stuff assets in New Zealand.

=== Stuff ownership, 2020–present ===
In late May 2020, Nine Entertainment agreed to sell Stuff and its assets including Neighbourly to Stuff's chief executive Sinead Boucher for NZ$1, with the transaction due to be completed by 31 May. This marked the return of the company into New Zealand ownership.

In December 2024, the Neighbourly was reorganised under the Stuff Digital umbrella, a division that also includes the news website stuff.co.nz and the evening news bulletin ThreeNews. In June 2025, online retailer Trade Me acquired a 50 percent stake in Stuff Digital, with Neighbourly and Stuff's events business being excluded from the split ownership deal.

=== Data breach ===
On 25 December 2025, a data breach was reported involving over 213 million lines of data, totalling 150Gb. The alleged compromised data included full names, email addresses, phone numbers, physical address and verified Neighborhood IDs, GPS coordinates, biographies and private messages and forum posts. On 3 January 2026, Neighbourly confirmed that a data breach had occurred on New Year's Day. By 7 January, Justice David Johnston of the High Court of New Zealand had issued an injunction preventing anyone from using or posting links to the stolen data from Neighbourly.
