= Manawatū Standard =

New Zealand regional newspaper

- Type: Daily newspaper
- Format: Tabloid (Monday–Friday); Broadsheet (Saturday)
- Owner: Stuff Limited
- Editor: Matthew Dallas
- Founded: 1880
- Headquarters: Palmerston North, New Zealand
- Circulation: 44,000
- ISSN: 1176-3558
- Website: www.thepost.co.nz/manawatu

The Manawatū Standard (formerly the Evening Standard) is the daily paper for the Manawatū region based in Palmerston North. The Manawatū Standard has been recognised as one of the best in New Zealand being a finalist in the 2008 Qantas Media Award (renamed to Voyager Media Awards after Voyager Internet Ltd stepped in as naming sponsor for the 2018 awards) for best regional daily newspaper; it won the same category in 2007. It also won Best Headline and Student Journalist of the Year at the Qantas Media Awards 2017.

== History ==
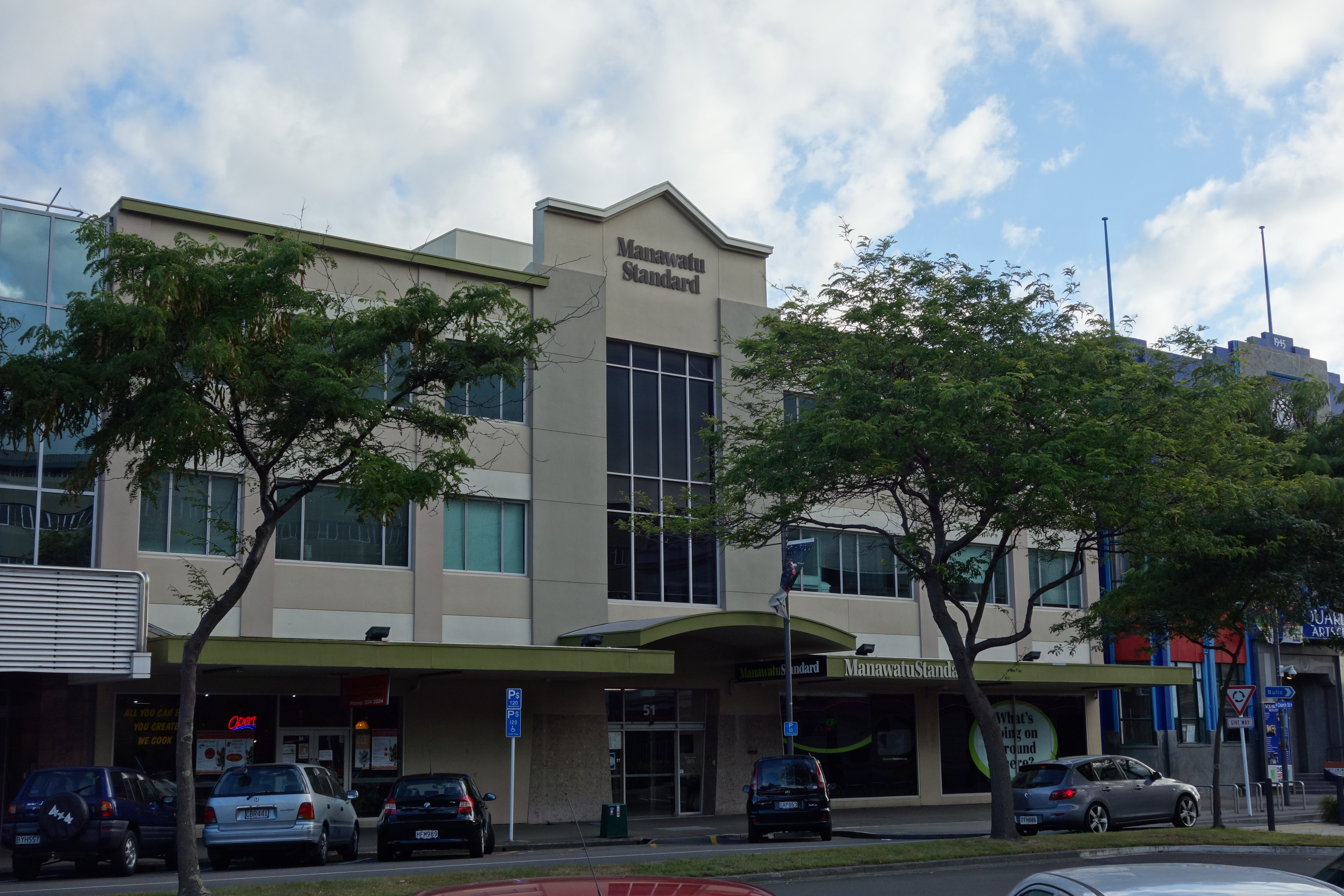
The office of the Manawatū Standard in Palmerston North

The company was first established on 29 November 1880. Since then, the paper has been operated by two other companies: it was purchased by Independent Newspapers Limited (INL) in the 1970s, and acquired by Fairfax Media (then John Fairfax Holdings) on 1 July 2003, when that company purchased INL. As of 1 February 2018, Fairfax Media was rebranded to Stuff Limited.

== Other publications ==
The Manawatū Standard also owns:

=== The Tribune ===
Published weekly and distributed for free to all homes in Palmerston North, Ashhurst and Linton, as well as rural subscribers to the Manawatū Standard. On 21 February 2018, Stuff Limited announced that it would be closing or selling off 28 community papers. On 24 April 2018 it was confirmed that The Tribune would close with the last publication being 30 May 2018.

=== The Feilding Rangitikei Herald ===
Published weekly on Thursday and delivered to every home in the Manawatū District Council area. In April 2016, the Feilding Herald, Rangitikei Mail and Central District Times combined to become the Feilding Rangitikei Herald. Finalist in the 2018 Voyager Media Awards for Community Paper of the Year, also being a finalist and winning the Canon Community Newspaper of the Year in 2017.

In early July 2025, Stuff confirmed that it would close down the community newspaper by 31 July 2025.

=== The Central Districts Farmer ===
Delivered on the first Friday of every month to all homes on rural delivery in the eight regions of the central and lower North Island. On 15 May 2018, the Central Districts Farmer closure was announced with the last publication being 11 June 2018.
