= The Evening Post (New Zealand) =

Former Wellington newspaper (1865–2002)

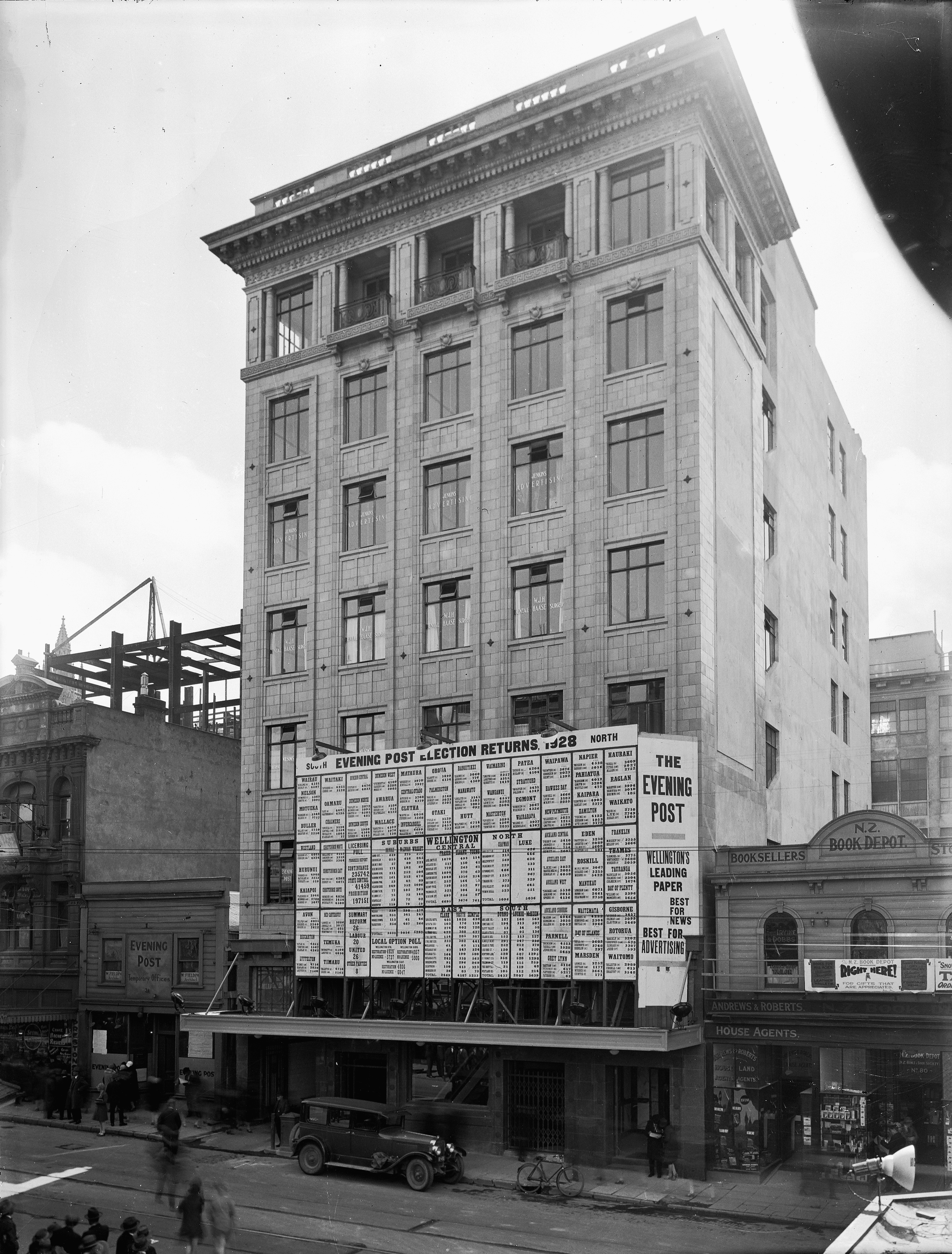
Blundell Bros Limited Head Office on Willis Street, Wellington Printing and publishing is in the linked building at the rear fronting onto Boulcott Street. Returns for the 1928 general election are visible on the front of the building.

Before radio became common: a crowd watches as election results are posted on the front of the Evening Post building

The Evening Post was an afternoon metropolitan daily newspaper based in Wellington, New Zealand. It was founded in 1865 by Dublin-born printer, newspaper manager and leader-writer Henry Blundell, who brought his large family to New Zealand in 1863.

With his partner from what proved to be a false-start at Havelock, David Curle, who left the partnership that July, Henry and his three sons printed with a hand-operated press and distributed Wellington's first daily newspaper, The Evening Post, on 8 February 1865. Operating from 1894 as Blundell Bros Limited, his sons and their descendants continued the very successful business which dominated its circulation area.

While The Evening Post was remarkable in not suffering the rapid circulation decline of evening newspapers elsewhere, it was decided in 1972 to merge ownership with that of the never-as-successful politically conservative morning paper, The Dominion, which belonged to listed Wellington Publishing Company Limited, within a new holding company — Independent Newspapers Limited.

Wellington Publishing Company Limited was, in 1964, one of the first parts of Rupert Murdoch's international empire, later News Corporation.

== The last Post ==
The Evening Post's last publication was on the afternoon of 6 July 2002 and the next day the morning-published sister-publication, The Dominion, displayed its new name—The Dominion Post.

At the end of June 2003, Murdoch's publishing business was sold to Australia-based Fairfax and the proceeds invested in New Zealand's Sky Network Television Limited.

In April 2023, The Dominion Post was renamed The Post.
