= Brisbane Times =

Australian online newspaper

- Type: News site
- Format: Online
- Owner: Nine Entertainment
- Editor: Rosanna Ryan
- Founded: 7 March 2007; 19 years ago
- Language: English
- Headquarters: Brisbane, Queensland, Australia
- Website: www.brisbanetimes.com.au

The Brisbane Times is an online newspaper with a focus on current affairs in Brisbane and Queensland, Australia. It is owned and run by Nine Publishing, which also publishes The Age, The Sydney Morning Herald and other mastheads. As of June 2025, the editor is Rosanna Ryan.

== History ==
The Brisbane Times was launched as part of Fairfax Media on 7 March 2007 by then-Queensland Premier Peter Beattie. The founding managing editor was Mitchell Murphy. The publication started with 14 journalists in an attempt by Fairfax to break into the South East Queensland market, competing against the website of News Corporation's incumbent The Courier-Mail.

As of 20 November 2018, Brisbane Times has started a subscription model. Viewers are limited to approximately 25 article views per month before being faced with a news paywall.

== Web traffic ==
According to third-party web analytics providers Alexa and SimilarWeb, the Brisbane Times is the 191st and 250th most visited website in Australia respectively, as of August 2015. SimilarWeb rates the site as the 24th most visited news website in Australia, attracting more than 2 million visitors per month.

== See also ==
- List of newspapers in Australia
