= Sinead Boucher =

New Zealand journalist and chief executive

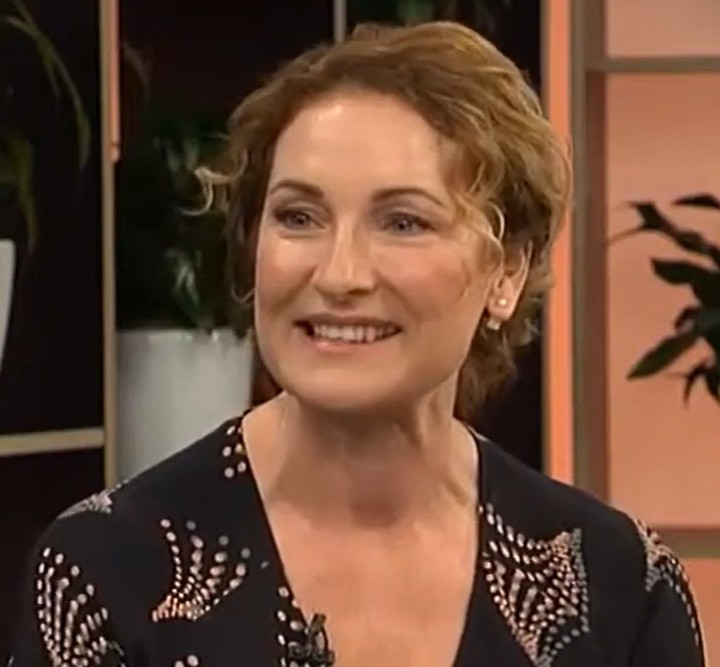
- Boucher in 2017
- Born: Sinead Marie O'Hanlon; 26 June 1970 (age 56); Northern Ireland
- Occupations: Journalist; media executive
- Awards: Wolfson Fellowship prize 2012

Sinead Marie Boucher (née O'Hanlon; born 26 June 1970) is a New Zealand media proprietor and journalist. She has been the owner and chief executive of Stuff Ltd since 2020, which owns Stuff, the country's largest news website, and nine national newspapers. In July 2023 she became the organisation's executive chair.

== Early life and family ==
Born in 1970 to Sean and Mary O'Hanlon, Boucher moved with her family from Belfast, Northern Ireland, to Christchurch, New Zealand, when she was about three years old. She was educated at Villa Maria College. After beginning to study law at the University of Canterbury, she dropped out and worked at McDonald's, before returning to Ireland for a time.

In 1992, she returned to New Zealand and completed a six-month journalism course at Aoraki Polytechnic in Timaru, where she met her future husband, Mark Boucher. The couple married in 2003 and they have two children.

== Career ==
In 1993, Boucher was employed by Fairfax as the North Canterbury branch office reporter for The Press newspaper.

In 1999, Boucher moved with her future husband Mark to London, where she worked for the Financial Times on its website FT.com and at Reuters' London bureau.

Boucher returned to New Zealand in 2003 and was appointed as an assistant editor at The Press, working on the newspaper's website. In 2007, she became Fairfax's first group digital editor, working on the Stuff website. In 2013, she became the group executive editor at Fairfax.

Boucher was appointed chief executive officer of Stuff Ltd in August 2017. In 2018, she described her priorities as CEO as to not only make a profit, but provide an internal environment for her people to connect and flourish. Her plan was to diversify the company away from a reliance on publishing revenues, to a range of initiatives that would give the company "a more stable and sustainable fate".

=== Purchase of Stuff Ltd ===
On 25 May 2020, Nine Entertainment agreed to sell Stuff to Boucher for NZ$1, with the transaction due to be completed by 31 May. Under the terms of the transaction, Nine will retain some of the proceeds of the sale of wholesale broadband business Stuff Fibre to telecommunications company Vocus Group, and ownership of Stuff's Wellington printing press. At the time of the announcement, she said the purchase gave Stuff "a real chance to take our destiny into our own hands and forge a really bright new future". She also said she intended to pursue giving staff the opportunity to purchase a share in the company, and wanted to enshrine the independence of editorial functions from owners i.e. herself and future share-owners.

=== Restructuring of Stuff Ltd ===
In early June 2023, Boucher stepped down as CEO and became executive chair and publisher. As part of the restructuring process, Boucher also reorganised Stuff into three divisions: Stuff Digital, Stuff Masthead Publishing, and Stuff Brand Connections. In September 2023, Boucher confirmed during an interview with Radio New Zealand that Stuff was lobbying for big tech companies such as Facebook owner Meta Platforms and Google to pay for online content produced by Stuff journalists. She also denied claims by The Platform's founder Sean Plunket that Stuff had received financial support from the Māori iwi (tribe) Ngāi Tahu, which she described as motivated by misogynistic views about the abilities of women.

In December 2024, Stuff was restructured into two separate print and digital media divisions: Masthead Publishing (consisting its newspaper brands) and Stuff Digital (its digital assets including stuff.co.nz, Neighbourly and ThreeNews. In June 2025, online retailer Trade Me acquired a 50 percent stake in Stuff Digital, with Stuff's property sections being rebranded as Trade Me Property. Under the arrangement, Boucher will chair the new Stuff Digital board, which will be split evenly into both Stuff and Trade Me members.

=== Awards ===
In 2012, Boucher was awarded the Wolfson Fellowship prize, the most prestigious journalism prize in New Zealand, which involves a 10-week stay at Cambridge University.
