= Fairfax Media =

Australian media company

- Formerly: John Fairfax and Sons; John Fairfax Holdings (before 2007)
- Type: Public company
- Industry: Media
- Predecessor: John Fairfax and Sons
- Founded: 1841; 185 years ago (as John Fairfax and Sons)
- Defunct: December 2018
- Fate: Merged with Nine Entertainment
- Successor: Nine Entertainment
- Headquarters: 1 Darling Island Road, Pyrmont, Sydney, New South Wales, Australia
- Area served: Australia; New Zealand
- Key people: Greg Hywood (CEO); Nick Falloon (Chairman)
- Products: Newspapers; Radio; Magazines; Websites
- Revenue: ▼AU$1.73 billion (25 June 2017)
- Net income: ▲AU$142.6 million (25 June 2017)
- Number of employees: ▼5,122 full-time employees ▼658 part-time and casual employees (25 June 2017)
- Website: fairfaxmedia.com.au (defunct)

Fairfax Media was a media company in Australia and New Zealand, with investments in newspaper, magazines, radio and digital properties. The company was founded by John Fairfax as John Fairfax and Sons, who purchased The Sydney Morning Herald in 1841. The Fairfax family retained control of the business until late in the 20th century.

The company also owned several regional and national Australian newspapers, including The Age, Australian Financial Review and Canberra Times, majority stakes in property business Domain Group and the Macquarie Radio Network, and joint ventures in streaming service Stan and online publisher HuffPost Australia.

The group's last chairman was Nick Falloon and the CEO was Greg Hywood.

On 26 July 2018, Fairfax Media and Nine Entertainment announced it had agreed on terms for a merger between the two companies. Shareholders in Nine Entertainment took a 51% of the combined entity and Fairfax shareholders own 49%. Fairfax Media was delisted from the Australian Securities Exchange in December 2018. Its metro publishing assets continue to be published by the group as Nine Publishing. Many of its other assets, such as its community media holdings were sold shortly after the merger was completed.

== History ==
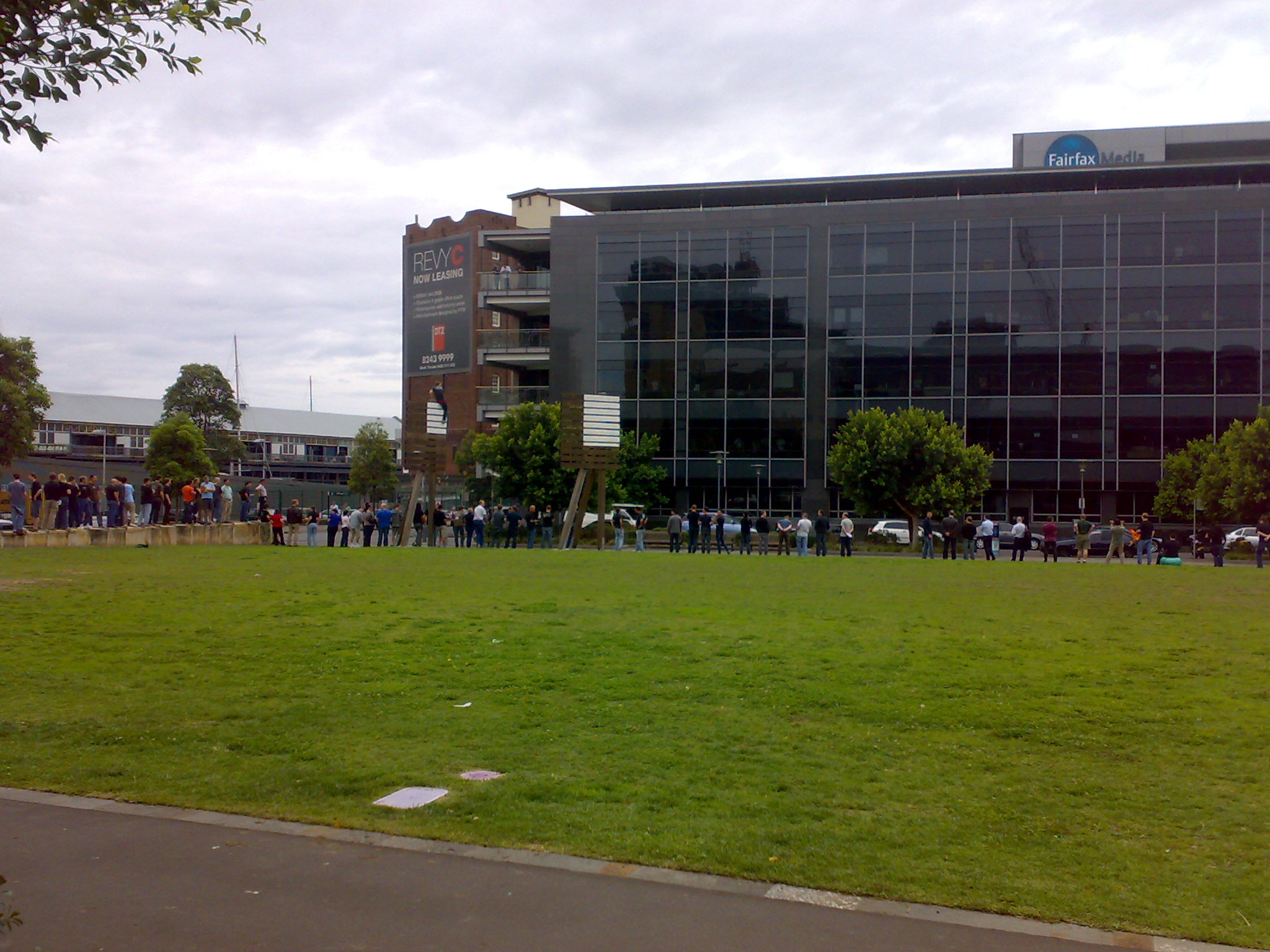
Fairfax Media headquarters in Pyrmont

John Fairfax purchased The Sydney Morning Herald in 1841. Several generations of the Fairfax family continued to control the company. Fairfax Media was founded by the Fairfax family as John Fairfax and Sons, later to become John Fairfax Holdings. The Fairfax family lost control of the company in December 1990. It was renamed from John Fairfax Holdings to Fairfax Media in 2007.

=== 1950s to 1999 ===
The Australian Financial Review was founded in 1951. Fairfax acquired The Sun in 1953. Also in that decade, Fairfax started two television stations, ATN and QTQ. Fairfax began expanding in the 1960s, acquiring, among others, The Age, The Newcastle Herald and the Illawarra Mercury. In 1979, Rupert Murdoch attempted to acquire rival The Herald and Weekly Times. Due to the costs of defending the acquisition, Fairfax sold its television properties, including the Seven Network. In 1988, Fairfax sold its magazines (including Woman's Day, People, Dolly, and Good Housekeeping) to Australian Consolidated Press, and discontinued its Sydney afternoon tabloid The Sun, transferring some of its content and the sponsorship of the City to Surf to its new Sunday tabloid The Sun-Herald which also replaced the broadsheet Sunday Herald.

In 1987, Warwick Fairfax, then aged 26, bought out his family's holdings in the company using borrowed debts. He successfully took ownership of the company, selling some properties to his half-brother John B. Fairfax, who formed Rural Press. On 10 December 1990, the company collapsed and a receiver was appointed, with company debts of A$1.7 billion. By 1993, the company was re-listed on the Australian Securities Exchange and the two biggest shareholders of John Fairfax Holdings were the Canadian newspaper magnate Conrad Black and his Hollinger Group with 25%, and the Australian media mogul, Kerry Packer and his publicly listed company, Publishing and Broadcasting Limited with 15%. Due to Australian government concerns over media consolidation that limited any single foreign shareholder holding more than 25% interest in national and metropolitan newspapers, after intense lobbying for the right to increase his stake, Black conceded defeat in 1996, selling his holding to the New Zealand corporate raider Brierley Investments, that was ultimately subject to the same restrictions.

=== 2000 to 2009 ===
In 2003, Fairfax acquired many of New Zealand's highest-profile newspapers when it bought the publishing assets of that country's Independent Newspapers, whose cornerstone shareholder was News Corp Australia. In July 2005, Fairfax acquired the RSVP dating site for A$38 million. In August 2005, Fairfax's general classifieds site created in March 2004, Cracker.com.au consistently exceeded 500,000 unique visitors a month. In December 2005, Fairfax acquired Stayz Pty Ltd for A$12.7 million. This investment proved to be successful as Stayz was sold on 27 November 2013, for $220 million, exceeding its estimated net debt of $154 million. In September 2007, Fairfax acquired online funds management business, InvestSMART, from founders Ron Hodge and Nigel Poole for A$12M. In August 2013, Fairfax sold the InvestSMART business to Australasian Wealth Investments Limited, now called InvestSMART Group Limited, for A$7M.

In August 2005, Fairfax ended its 16-month search for a new chief executive officer with David Kirk, a former Rugby World Cup winning captain of the All Blacks being appointed to replace departing CEO Fred Hilmer. David Kirk got the job ahead of Fairfax COO Brian Evans (former head of Fairfax New Zealand) and Doug Flynn, who took the top job at UK Pest control company Rentokil after negotiations with Fairfax broke off. In March 2006, Fairfax acquired New Zealand auction website Trademe.co.nz for NZ$700 million. On 4 March 2006, it was announced that Fairfax would purchase The Border Mail newspaper in Albury-Wodonga for A$162 million. In October 2006, speculation began to grow that the company would be bought out and split up after the passage of changes to Australian media laws. Rival media company News Corp Australia purchased a 7.5 per cent stake in the company at this time, This was with the stated aim of keeping Fairfax in one piece.

On 7 December 2006, John Fairfax Holdings and Rural Press announced the beginning of their merger proceedings. Once merged, the new entity formed a publishing company worth A$9 billion and resulted in regaining control of The Canberra Times (which it owned in the 1980s), and through John B. Fairfax of Rural Press, saw the return of the Fairfax family to the company board. The company also gained a number of other regional newspapers, radio stations and websites; plus agricultural publications in various countries. On 12 January 2007, John Fairfax Holdings changed its name to Fairfax Media.

On 7 March 2007, Fairfax Media announced a new website for Brisbane, called the Brisbane Times. The website initially employed 14 journalists and was an attempt by Fairfax to break into the South East Queensland market. On 20 March 2007 Fairfax Media launched a new business website, BusinessDay.com.au that aggregated feeds from the other news vehicles in the Fairfax stable as well as "from the world's most respected news sources". It featured breaking news updated "every 15 minutes". Also in 2007 Fairfax Media bought the radio assets of Southern Cross Broadcasting. Macquarie Media Group purchased Southern Cross for A$1.35 billion and onsold these assets to the Fairfax Group.

On 26 August 2007, Kirk and Deputy CEO Brian McCarthy announced that 550 staff would be cut as part of a "business improvement" programme. The staff reductions would take place in both Australia and New Zealand, with the latter country bearing the brunt of the cuts, with 160 full-time employees losing their jobs. On 5 December, David Kirk tendered his resignation, and on 10 December Brian McCarthy (former Rural Press CEO) was appointed as CEO. A new campaign, "Fair Go, Fairfax: Don't discount journalism", was launched by the MEAA in protest to the cuts arguing that the jobs losses will affect "quality journalism".

As of May 2008 Fairfax Media had a market capitalisation of over A$5 billion. The number of printed edition readers has fallen since 2006 and the group's stock price has declined by more than 60 percent since 2007, to less than A$2 billion by September 2011, and by 85 percent at June 2012.

On 11 July 2007, Fairfax Media acquired the former radio assets of Southern Cross Broadcasting (on-sold from Macquarie Media Group's purchase of SCB): 2UE Sydney, 3AW and Magic 1278 Melbourne, 4BC and 4BH Brisbane, and 6PR and 96FM Perth. Graham Mott will continue in his role as general manager of the broadcast radio group under Fairfax. Mott indicated at the time of the acquisition that national syndication of programming (such as that of the since-retired John Laws) would largely be replaced on the network with more localised syndication at a state level.

Fairfax also acquired Satellite Music Australia (SMA) as part of the SCB deal, who provide music channels to retailers, as well as Foxtel and Austar (where it is branded AIR). MyTalk, a datacasting channel, was officially purchased from Southern Cross Broadcasting on 5 November 2007, and ceased broadcasting on 25 February 2008.

=== 2010 to 2013 ===
In late 2011, John B. Fairfax and his family investment company, Marinya Media, sold their remaining 9.7 percent stake in Fairfax Media for A$189 million. The sale came after an earlier dispute between John B. Fairfax and Ron Walker, Chairman of the Board of Fairfax Media, which led to the very public departure of Walker. Continued poor performance of Fairfax Media in light of changing news services was cited as one of the reasons for the sale of Marinya Media's interests in Fairfax. John B. Fairfax had earlier stood down from the Fairfax board, and his son, Nick Fairfax, was reported to be discussing his future with the rest of the company board.

In 2012, mining billionaire Gina Rinehart became Fairfax's biggest shareholder, purchasing a 14 percent stake in the company. Rinehart also sought a position on the Fairfax board. By June 2012, Rinehart had increased her stake in Fairfax Media to 18.67 percent, and was believed to seek three board seats and involvement in editorial decisions. There were reports that Rinehart sought to increase her total share to 19.99%, the maximum allowed before a takeover offer must be made. But provisions in Fairfax Media's insurance policy denied cover for directors owning more than 15%, so Rinehart had to sell down to 14.99%. Rinehart was denied a place on the board because she would not agree to Fairfax's charter of independence, and sold her stake in 2015.

On 18 June 2012, as part of evolving to a sustainable model for its news media business, Fairfax Media announced it would cut 1,900 staff and begin to erect digital paywalls around its two main metropolitan news brands, The Sydney Morning Herald and The Age. It also announced it was shifting to "compact" or tabloid-sized editions of the broadsheet newspapers from March 2013, and that its two printing facilities at Chullora and Tullamarine would close. The changes, prompted by shrinking advertising revenue, were expected to generate A$235 million in annual savings over three years.

In 2012, Fairfax Media acquired Netus Pty Ltd, a technology investment company which owned 85% of Allure Media, and purchased the remaining 15% from minority shareholders. Allure Media own a range of websites, including the Australian licenses for Business Insider, Lifehacker, Gizmodo, and Kotaku.

=== 2014 to 2018 ===
In 2014, Fairfax Media founded online streaming company Stan with Nine Entertainment, investing $50 million into the joint venture. In December 2014, Fairfax merged with Macquarie Radio Network. Under the deal, Fairfax gained a 55% share in Macquarie. A party may hold only two radio licences in each market, so some stations including 2CH and the Macquarie Regional Radio network were sold. In turn, 96FM Perth was sold to Australian Radio Network. The merger was completed in March 2015.

In 2015, Fairfax created a partnership with The Huffington Post to launch HuffPost Australia.

Drive.com.au is an Australian motoring website founded by in 1996 by Fairfax Media. In 2015 Fairfax outsourced production to 112 Pty Ltd, owner of The Motor Report. After the takeover of Fairfax Media by Nine Entertainment, in 2019 is merged with the latter's CarAdvice platform.

In March 2016, many staff from its newspaper divisions went on a 4-day strike over planned job cuts of 120 editorial staff from The Sydney Morning Herald, The Age and The Australian Financial Review. All printed and digital editions continued during the action. On May 18, 2017, Hellman & Friedman made a A$2.9 billion bid for Fairfax Media, starting a bidding war with TPG Capital for Fairfax. Fairfax opened books to both parties, opening the door for The Sydney Morning Herald and The Age to pass into foreign ownership.

On 26 July 2018, Fairfax Media and Nine Entertainment announced it had agreed on terms for a merger between the two companies. Shareholders in Nine Entertainment Co. took a 51% of the combined entity and Fairfax shareholders own 49%. Fairfax Media was delisted from the Australian Securities Exchange in December 2018.

== Products and divisions ==
Fairfax had a portfolio of print and digital media assets. The Fairfax divisions cover:

- Australian Metro Publishing: includes masthead newspaper brands The Sydney Morning Herald, The Age and The Australian Financial Review, and lifestyle brands, including "Goodfood", Drive, "Essential Baby", "Traveller", and a joint venture in Nabo. Australian Metro Publishing was largely succeeded by Nine Publishing.
- Australian Community Media: a network of regional, rural and local newspapers, including The Canberra Times, The Newcastle Herald and Illawarra Mercury, as well as free community papers. This was spun-off into an independent company in 2019.
- Printing: Printing facilities in Australia and New Zealand.
- Events: arts, cultural, business, entertainment and sporting events, including Good Food Month and City2Surf and City to Surf (Perth). This entity was sold to Ironman Group.
- Digital ventures: encompasses dating sites RSVP and Oasis, weather forecasters, including Weatherzone, digital publisher Allure Media (parent company of Gizmodo and PopSugar among others), and its partnerships with The Huffington Post for HuffPost Australia and Nine Entertainment Co. for Stan.
- Radio: holds a 54.4% stake in Macquarie Radio Network, the parent company of AM band radio stations, including 2GB, 3AW, 4BC and 6PR, as well as music distributor Satellite Music Australia.
- New Zealand: Stuff included national brand Stuff.co.nz and metro titles The Dominion Post in Wellington and The Press in Christchurch, as well as magazine titles and events.

Fairfax held a 60% stake in Domain Group, a digital real estate business containing Domain.com.au, which was a wholly owned subsidiary until it was spun off as a publicly listed company in November 2017.

== Properties ==
=== Australia ===
==== Newspapers ====
Fairfax Media published metropolitan, agricultural, regional and community newspapers, financial and consumer magazines. In Australia, mastheads include The Sydney Morning Herald, The Age, The Australian Financial Review, The Canberra Times, The Sun-Herald and The Land.

Fairfax published The Age and The Sydney Morning Herald. It also publishes a daily business tabloid, The Australian Financial Review.

Fairfax also owned papers in major regional centres, including the Illawarra Mercury (Wollongong), The Newcastle Herald (Newcastle), The Border Mail (Albury-Wodonga), The Daily Advertiser (Wagga Wagga), The Courier (Ballarat) and Bendigo Advertiser (Bendigo). In addition, its subsidiary Fairfax Community Newspapers publishes 35 community newspapers serving suburban Victoria and New South Wales.

As a result of its Rural Press acquisition, Fairfax took control of many newspapers including The Canberra Times and The Land.

On 30 April 2019, Nine announced the sale of Fairfax community papers to former Fairfax Media executive Antony 'The Cat' Catalano for $115 million.

==== Magazines ====
Fairfax published a number of magazines, such as The Magazine (Sydney), The Age Magazine (Melbourne) and Good Weekend, which were distributed with their newspapers. In addition, the company published business-centered magazines including BRW (since December 2013, only published online), AFR Smart Investor, AFR Magazine, AFR Boss, CFO Australia, MIS (magazine) and Asset (Magazine).

==== Digital ====
Fairfax owned a profitable Australian online subsidiary, Fairfax Digital, which was once known as the F2 Network. Fairfax publishes web editions of most of its newspaper titles, as well as digital only news sites in South East Queensland as the Brisbane Times; and in Western Australia as WAtoday. Both The Age and The Sydney Morning Herald produce a limited amount of video content, which is only available online. As a rival to Nine.com.au's Nine News and Yahoo7's Seven News, Fairfax websites previously had non-exclusive licensing deals to replay news video content from broadcaster Network Ten and its former main news service Ten News at Five (now Ten Eyewitness News). Fairfax's deal with Ten has now discontinued when their news video content are now being shown on Ten's catch-up service, Tenplay which launched in late 2013. From 2014, Fairfax now have non-exclusive licensing deal with Channel Seven by using clips from Seven News with Mark Ferguson.

Rural Press owns a range of similar classifieds and local newspaper websites.

On 21 December 2012, Fairfax Media announced the acquisition of Netus Pty Ltd, a technology investment company. Netus owned 85% of Allure Media. Fairfax purchased the remaining 15 per cent of Allure Media from minority shareholders resulting in Fairfax ownership of 100 per cent of Allure Media. Allure Media own a range of websites, including the Australian licenses for Lifehacker, Gizmodo and Kotaku.

==== Syndication ====
Fairfax Syndication manages the commercial licensing and distribution of text, photographic and multimedia content to media companies and commercial clients worldwide. Fairfax Syndication has enabled instant online licensing and has developed a customised syndication application 'API' that allows existing and future syndication clients access to real-time content from multiple websites for immediate use on other platforms. The division also represents their image library and photo syndication service containing over 16 million images.

=== New Zealand ===
The New Zealand subsidiary was named Fairfax New Zealand Limited until 2018, when it was renamed Stuff Limited to align with the name of its flagship website. It was sold to its CEO Sinead Boucher in a management buyout for $1 NZD in 2020. Parent company Nine retained most of the proceeds of the sale of Stuff's broadband subsidiary to Vocus Group, and maintained control of its Wellington printing press operation.

On 1 September 2011, Fairfax New Zealand announced the launch of the news agency Fairfax New Zealand News (FNZ), partly in response to the New Zealand Press Association (NZPA) closure, but also as part of its drive to improve its journalism. In December 2014, Fairfax entered a partnership with local social media platform Neighbourly. In 2016, Fairfax Media sold a number of its key special interest titles, including Boating New Zealand and New Zealand Fishing News magazines.

== See also ==
- Australian Financial Review
