= Nine Entertainment =

Australian media and entertainment company

Nine Entertainment Co. Holdings Limited
- Logo used since 2025

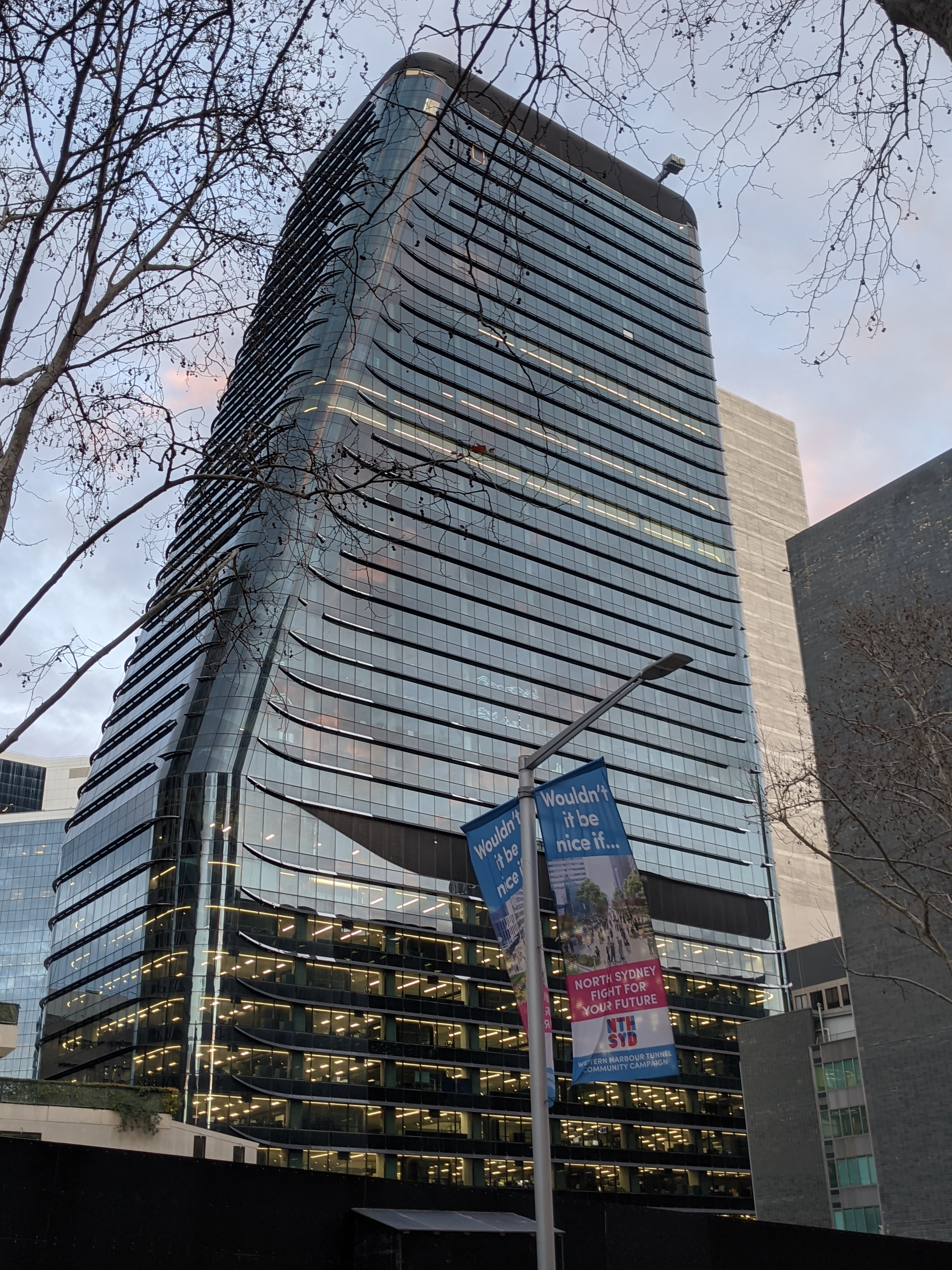
- Nine Entertainment's current headquarters
- Trade name: Nine Entertainment
- Type: Public
- Traded as: ASX: NEC; S&P/ASX 200 component
- Industry: Mass media
- Predecessor: PBL Media; Fairfax Media
- Founded: 18 October 2006; 20 years ago
- Headquarters: 1 Denison Street, North Sydney, Australia
- Key people: Catherine West (Chair); Matt Stanton (CEO)
- Products: TV; radio; print; digital
- Revenue: A$1.378 billion (H1 FY24)
- Operating income: A$169.372 million (H1 FY24)
- Net income: A$114.416 million (H1 FY24)
- Total assets: A$4.044 billion (H1 FY24)
- Total equity: A$1.886 billion (H1 FY24)
- Number of employees: 4,698 (Including subsidiaries)
- Divisions: Nine Broadcasting; Nine Digital and Publishing
- Subsidiaries: Stan; Nine Network; The Age; Sydney Morning Herald
- Website: www.nineforbrands.com.au www.nine.com.au

Nine Entertainment Co. Holdings Limited is an Australian publicly listed company with holdings in mass media radio and television broadcasting, publishing and digital media. It uses Nine as its corporate branding.

The entity is largely a successor to the former Publishing and Broadcasting Limited (PBL), which was established by the Packer family. The Packers ended their involvement with the company in 2008 and its name was changed to Nine in 2010. The company merged with Fairfax Media in December 2018, expanding its brands and investments across television, video on demand, print, digital, radio and real estate classifieds.

Nine's assets include the Nine Network, major newspaper mastheads such as the Sydney Morning Herald, The Age and the Australian Financial Review; digital properties such as nine.com.au, 9Honey, and Pedestrian; and video-on-demand platform Stan.

== History ==
The company was a successor of the long-established Australian media group Australian Consolidated Press (ACP), created by Sir Frank Packer, whose Channel 9 was Australia's first commercial TV network. Kerry Packer inherited the company after his father's death in 1974. ACP was combined with the Nine Network in 1994 as Publishing and Broadcasting Ltd (PBL).

=== PBL Media ===
Under a split of PBL into two companies, after Kerry Packer's death in 2005, PBL Media, formerly held by PBL, was transferred to Consolidated Media Holdings (CMH).

PBL Media was established in October 2006, when PBL transferred its media interests, including the ACP Magazines, Nine Network, and ninemsn, to the new business – a joint venture between PBL and CVC Asia Pacific. The recapitalisation was announced on 18 October 2006. John Alexander, chief executive officer of PBL, was announced as the executive chairman of PBL Media, along with Ian Law as CEO and Pat O'Sullivan as chief financial officer.

In June 2007, PBL announced that it would sell a further 25% to CVC Capital Partners for $515 million. In September 2007, it was announced that the transaction was to go ahead at the increased purchase price of approximately $526 million.

On 27 October 2008, James Packer and CMH representatives, such as Alexander, resigned from the board of PBL Media, effectively ending financial backing and future associations with the company. James Packer later sold his media interests.

On 16 December 2008, PBL Media issued a press release stating that the company's majority shareholder, CVC Capital Partners, had refinanced debt facilities as well as injecting in excess of $300 million. CMH stated that they would not be investing any further funds, and as such, CMH's 25% interest became diluted to a stake less than 1%.

=== Nine Entertainment ===
From 2 December 2010, PBL Media rebranded as Nine Entertainment Company In December 2011, former McDonald's Australia chief executive Peter Bush was appointed chairman following the resignation of Tim Parker. In February 2013, David Haslingden, previously President and Chief Operating Officer of Fox Networks Group, was appointed to the Board as an independent non-executive director and chairman.

In December 2013, Nine Entertainment listed on the ASX, trading as ASX: NEC. Vendors included Apollo Global Management, Oaktree Capital and Goldman Sachs who took over from CVC in a refinancing deal in October 2012 when Nine was on the brink of receivership.

In 2014, Nine Entertainment Co. founded online streaming company Stan with Fairfax Media, investing $50 million into the joint venture.

On 16 April 2015, Nine Entertainment Co. announced the sale of its Nine Live business to Affinity Equity Partners for $640 million to reduce debt and fund an ongoing capital management program. In October 2015, the WIN Corporation purchased a 14% stake in Nine Entertainment Co. from investment fund operator Apollo.

==== Hugh Marks (2015–2020) ====
In November 2015, Hugh Marks was appointed as CEO. He replaced David Gyngell, who remained on the board. In February 2016, Peter Costello was appointed chair.

In March 2016, Nine Entertainment Co purchased a 9.9% stake in Southern Cross Media Group from the Macquarie Group. On 29 April 2016, Nine Entertainment Co. ended a 27-year affiliation agreement with WIN Corporation, instead partnering with Southern Cross Austereo in parts of regional Queensland, New South Wales and Victoria, after securing a 50% revenue sharing deal with Southern Cross, which is higher than its existing 39% deal with WIN. Nine sold its stake in the business in September.

On 26 July 2018, Nine Entertainment Co. and Fairfax Media announced they agreed on terms for a merger between the two companies to become Australia's largest media company. As a result of the merger, Nine shareholders own 51.1 percent of the combined entity and Fairfax shareholders own 48.9 percent. After the merger between Nine Entertainment Co and Fairfax Media in December 2018, WIN Corporation's stake was diluted to 7.76% but later increased to 15.24% in January 2018. In September 2018, it was announced that WIN Corporation's overall economic interest had grown to 25%.

On 25 May 2020, Nine Entertainment sold their New Zealand subsidiary Stuff, which had been acquired during the purchase of Fairfax in December 2018, to Stuff's chief executive Sinead Boucher for NZ$1. The transaction was completed by 31 May and marked the return of Stuff into New Zealand ownership. As part of the agreement, Nine received all proceeds of the sale of wholesale broadband business Stuff Fibre to telecommunications company Vocus Group, and ownership of Stuff's Wellington printing press.

In November 2020, Marks resigned from the Nine Network after revealing he was in a relationship with a former colleague. Nine Entertainment relocated from Willoughby, where it had been based for 64 years, to new offices at 1 Denison Street, North Sydney in December 2020.

==== Mike Sneesby (2021–2024) ====
In March 2021, Nine Entertainment announced the appointment of Mike Sneesby as Chief Executive Officer, effective 1 April 2021, following Hugh Marks resignation. On 12 March 2021, Nine announced that it would be returning its regional affiliation back to WIN Television, ending its 5 year affiliation with SCA. As part of the deal, WIN will pay Nine 50% of advertising revenue and provide airtime to Nine's assets across its television and radio network. The affiliation switch was reversed on 1 July 2021. Upon the switch, WIN's unique branding was phased out in favour of Nine's metro branding with the WIN branding retained for local idents, promos, community announcements and sponsor billboards. However, WIN News remains under its unique name and format.

It was announced on 15 September 2021, that WIN's advertising department would be merged into Nine's advertising team with Nine's advertising platform 9Galaxy extending into regional areas from July 2022. This will mean advertisers in regional areas can book advertising directly with Nine for the first time instead of booking with WIN.

In June 2024, Peter Costello resigned as chairman and was replaced by Catherine West.

In September 2024, after mounting pressure over allegations of toxic culture, Mike Sneesby announced he was stepping down as chief executive of Nine Entertainment and would leave the media company at the end of the month.

==== Matt Stanton (2024–present) ====
In March 2025, Nine Entertainment confirmed that acting CEO Matt Stanton had been appointed as permanent CEO. Stanton was Nine's chief strategy and financial officer before becoming interim CEO in September 2024.

In May 2025, American property technology company CoStar entered an agreement to acquire Domain Group, including Nine's 60% stake, for A$3 billion.

In September 2025, Catherine West resigned as chair and will be replaced by former deputy chair of the ABC Peter Tonagh on 7 November.

In January 2026, Nine Entertainment announced the sale of its radio stations to the Laundy family who rebranded Nine Radio as Tapt Media in May 2026, NBN Television to the WIN Corporation, and the acquisition of QMS Media. In late January 2026, Nine Entertainment acquired the outdoor advertising company QMS, the owner of MediaWorks New Zealand, for A$850 million (NZ$986 million).

In February 2026, it was announced Nine Darwin would be acquired by WIN Corporation's WIN Television, expanded broadcast operations into the NT.

== Assets ==
=== Television ===
- Nine Network, an Australian commercial free-to-air television primary channel
  - Sydney, Melbourne, Brisbane, Adelaide, Perth
- 9HD is an Australian free-to-air HD digital television multichannel using the primary channel simulcast
- 9Gem is an Australian free-to-air digital television multichannel suitable for sport and entertainment
- 9Go! is an Australian free-to-air digital television multichannel aimed at 14- to 39-year-olds.
- 9Life is an Australian free-to-air digital television multichannel featuring reality and lifestyle programs
- 9Rush is an Australian free-to-air digital television multichannel aimed at a 25- to 54-year-old male audience. (joint venture with WBD)
- 10 Darwin (50% joint venture with Seven Media Group, Network 10 affiliate)
- 9Now a video on demand, catch-up TV service which carries the main and multichannels of the Nine Network
- Stan, an Australian subscription streaming service.

=== Digital and print ===
==== Nine Digital ====
- 9News.com.au, a news portal
- Nine.com.au, a web portal
  - 9Entertainment
  - 9Finance
  - 9Honey, a women's web network
  - 9Product Review
  - 9Travel
- Future Women
- Pedestrian Group
- Wide World of Sports, online services of Nine's sports brand

==== Nine Publishing ====
- Australian Financial Review, a newspaper and subscription news website
  - The Australian Financial Review Magazine, a monthly magazine insert
  - BOSS, a monthly magazine insert
  - Life & Leisure, a magazine insert
  - Luxury, a quarterly magazine insert
- Brisbane Times, a newspaper and subscription news website
- The Age, a newspaper and subscription news website
- The Sydney Morning Herald, a newspaper and subscription news website
  - Good Weekend, a magazine insert in The Age and The Sydney Morning Herald
  - Good Food, a content brand for The Age and The Sydney Morning Herald
  - Traveller, a magazine insert in The Age and The Sydney Morning Herald
  - Sunday Life, a magazine insert in The Age and The Sydney Morning Herald
- WAtoday, a newspaper and subscription news website

=== Other businesses ===
- 9Saver
- 9Voyager, an advertisement buying platform

== Former assets ==
- ACP Magazines, a magazine publisher operating in Australia, New Zealand, Asia and the United Kingdom. Sold to the Bauer Media Group in 2012.
- Australian Community Media, a newspaper publisher. Sold to Antony Catalano and Thorney Investment Group in 2019
- Cudo, a group buying site launched as a joint venture with Microsoft Sold to Deals.com.au in 2013
- Fairfax Events and Entertainment, an events and entertainment company. Sold to Ironman group in 2019
- Find a Babysitter, a babysitter website was sold to its co-founders, Delia Timms and Jeff Bonnes, in 2021.
- Nine Radio, formerly known as Macquarie Media, a radio network and media company. Sold to Laundy Group in 2026, rebranded as Tapt Media.
- RSVP, an online dating service was sold by Nine to its managers David Heysen and Daniel Haigh in 2021.
- Stuff Ltd, a New Zealand publisher and digital company. Sold to Sinead Boucher in May 2020.
- Sydney Super Dome, an entertainment and sporting complex located in Sydney. Sold to Affinity Equity Partners in 2015
- Ticketek, an event ticketing company operating in Australia and New Zealand. Sold to Affinity Equity Partners in 2015.
- Sky News Australia (33%), an Australian 24-hour cable news channel (joint venture with BSkyB and Seven West Media). Sold to News Corp Australia in December 2016.
- Southern Cross Media Group (9.9%), a radio and regional television media company. Divested in 2016.
- Weatherzone (75%), a weather information provider. Sold to DTN in 2019.
- Domain Group (59.2%), digital property portal and owner of the real-estate websites domain.com.au, commercialrealestate.com.au and allhomes.com.au. Acquired by CoStar Group in 2025.
- NBN, a regional television media company. Sold to WIN Corporation in 2026 from Nine Entertainment, to be operated as a Nine Network regional affiliate.
- NTD, a regional television station based in Darwin, Northern Territory. Sold to the WIN Corporation.
