= Claire Deeks =

Advance New Zealand candidate in the 2020 New Zealand general election

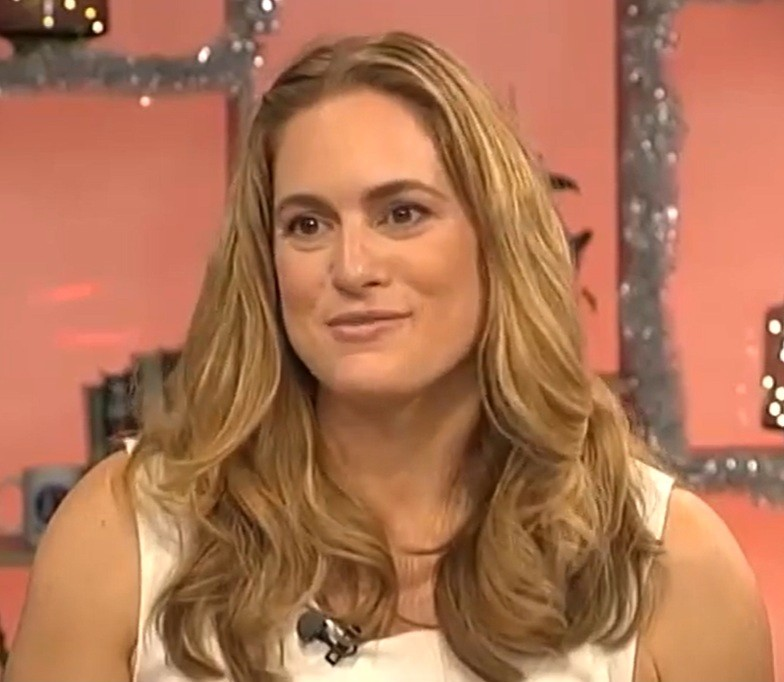
Deeks in 2016

Claire Ann Deeks is a New Zealand anti-vaccine activist who has challenged the government's response to COVID-19. She was an unsuccessful candidate for the Advance NZ party in the 2020 general election, and set up the group Voices for Freedom (VFF), which distributed pamphlets that have been criticised by experts as containing COVID-19 misinformation about vaccines, lockdown and the wearing of masks. As a food blogger, Deeks promoted the paleo diet and "healthy" lunchboxes for children, and developed a petition to stop the rating system for foods used by the NZ and Australian governments. She is a former intellectual property lawyer.

== Fad diet advocacy ==
By 2016 as a full-time food blogger, Deeks was getting a profile in the New Zealand media as a "Kiwi mum and real food advocate". She toured the country under the banner of "Mothers on a Mission (For A Kids Lunchbox Revolution)", which promoted "healthy and affordable lunchbox snacks". On a podcast with Pete Evans, Deeks later reflected that when she first changed her diet and set up a paleo diet blog for kids, she became "alive to the fact that there were so many powerful interests at play and we were basically being brainwashed every day."

In 2016 Deeks used her blog to launch a petition to the Australian and New Zealand governments to ditch the Health Star Rating System for packaged foods and beverages that both were using. Speaking with Kathryn Ryan on Radio New Zealand (RNZ), Deeks said the system was likely to lead to people not looking at the ingredients in food and over-focus on the rating, and that she was cynical because it was "putting a lot of money and effort into looking at processed food...[rather]...than getting people back to looking at real food." She called the system "overly simplistic and at worst, it is deliberately misleading and at best is an unfortunate situation."

In another item on RNZ, Deeks spoke to Jack Tame and said that the rating system was encouraging people to eat more sugar. With Mike Hosking on Newstalk ZB, she claimed that the system was making it confusing for people to get accurate information about food that they need to eat healthily. However, dietitian Gaye Philpott, from Nutrition Matters, acknowledged that while people have the right to make food and healthy lifestyle choices, she believed the Health Star Rating System worked in New Zealand because it clearly showed how much fat, sugar and sodium was in food.

== Political aspirations ==
In July 2020, when Jami-Lee Ross announced that Advance NZ was going to form an alliance with the NZ Public Party, led by Billy Te Kahika, to contest the 2020 New Zealand general election, he publicly stated that the focus would be on "restoring rights and freedoms to New Zealanders...[repealing]...the Covid-19 Public Health Response Act that allows for mandatory detention, mandatory medical procedures and warrantless entry powers into people’s homes...[and developing]... a real Bill of Rights that is enshrined in a written constitution that Parliament can’t override".

Deeks stood for Advance NZ in the election as third on their party list, behind Te Kahika and Ross. When campaigning, she claimed that the New Zealand government had abused the Bill of Rights when putting the country into lockdown during the COVID-19 pandemic, said that some of the people who had died during the pandemic in New Zealand had actually tested negative for COVID, and suggested that the complexity of the law around wearing of masks was deliberate, because the "Government was preparing for possible health and safety legal issues if somebody suffered an injury from wearing a mask". Advance NZ got 1% of the votes in the election, well short of the threshold of 5% for any of its candidates to enter Parliament without an electorate seat. Deeks continued to post on the Advance NZ website.

== Voices for Freedom ==
Deeks, along with Libby Jonson of Truly Myrtle (knitting designer) and Alia Bland of Little Bee (crochet designer), founded Voices for Freedom in December 2020. The group claimed on their website to be "a non-political organisation focused on protecting New Zealanders' fundamental human rights with a particular focus on freedom of speech, health/medical freedom and all freedoms under attack from an overzealous and oppressive Covid-19 response". The group's Facebook page was removed for what the social media platform said was "misinformation that could cause physical harm". One of the group's co-founders said they knew it would happen, "we just didn't know quite when". In December 2021, it was reported in the New Zealand news media that CERT NZ, the government agency responsible for receiving and collating reports of mis- and disinformation related to COVID-19, identified Voices for Freedom as one of the "main proponents of false information".

In March 2023, VFF launched an online radio station called Reality Check Radio (RCR). Deeks, along with co-founders Jonson and Bland, each held a 33.33% stake in the company, which was registered as NZ Media Holdings 2023 Limited. Notable RCR hosts include former ACT Party leader Rodney Hide, former TVNZ broadcaster Peter Williams, anti-vaccine influencer Chantelle Baker, and former Radio New Zealand broadcaster Paul Brennan.

=== Associations ===
==== Advance NZ political party ====
David Fisher, a senior writer for the NZ Herald, wrote in March 2021 that the group helped to distribute a magazine, Real News, that had been drawn together by Advance NZ, Voices for Freedom and two publishers Jonathan Elsen and Katherine Smith, both with connections to The New Zealand Journal of Natural Medicine and Uncensored, magazines with a background of publishing false claims. A Te Puke doctor, Christine Williams, said the editors should be held to account for the magazine that promoted conspiracy theories about vaccines, Bill Gates, herbal cures and lockdown. University of Auckland professor of medicine Des Gorman said, "in the context of encouraging free and open speech, there is a fine line, and this publication crosses that line ...[and] ... violates freedom of expression because it is a litany of lies".

==== Peter Williams ====
Talkback host Peter Williams on Magic Talk made comments about Voices for Freedom, saying that while he did not know who they were, the group was just asking questions about vaccines as he had done on his show, and it was the role of the media to hold discussions where there are no wrong opinions. In an interview with Marc Daalder, a senior political reporter at Newsroom, Williams stated he was not anti-vaccine but repeated an untrue statement that the vaccine was still in a trial period. He said it was an issue of "free speech" and accused Newsroom of attempting to "censor" him. He also had no problem with Voices for Freedom endorsing unproven COVID-19 treatments, such as ivermectin, or opposing the wearing of masks. According to Williams, there was no misinformation being shared by the group. On social media, Voices for Freedom thanked Williams for what was effectively a 'shout-out' to the group. Mediaworks had no concerns about William's comments. He left the station a few months later.

==== Covid Plan B ====
Voices for Freedom has been linked to 'Covid Plan B', promoted by a group of anti-lockdown health professionals and academics, headed by University of Auckland epidemiology senior lecturer Simon Thornley, who in March 2020 questioned the validity of the lockdown put in place by the New Zealand Government. Anti-misinformation group Fight Against Conspiracy Theories (FACT) sent 'Covid Plan B' an open letter asking it to stop promoting anti-vaccine, anti-mask group Voices for Freedom. Thornley said that while both groups were critical of the Government's 'excessive response' to COVID-19, Plan B did not engage in conspiracy theories and there had never been any formal partnership with VFF. Thornley had, however, been a keynote speaker at an event held by VFF, and Covid Plan B's Facebook page shared multiple posts by VFF. VFF members had a presence on a Covid Plan B webinar, and both groups appeared to have been "working together earlier this year to organise Plan B's online international symposium".

==== doTERRA ====
Deeks is a "platinum wellness advocate" for doTERRA, an international multi-level marketing company that sells essential oils and other related products. Some consultants of doTERRA had been involved in controversies after claiming, without scientific evidence, that their products could boost immunity, and in 2020 they were warned by the Federal Trade Commission to stop making these claims. It has been said that these distributors were attempting to benefit from the public concerns during COVID-19. On the 14 May 2021, it was reported in the New Zealand media that Voices for Freedom had removed a page from their website that had promoted doTERRA. A spokesperson for Voices for Freedom denied they were involved in selling essential oils, but the article noted that Deeks was a doTERRA seller who had encouraged the use of essential oils in her recipes. The safety of this practice was questioned on RNZ in 2019.

=== COVID-19 misinformation pamphlets ===
Voices for Freedom was in the media in April 2021 for delivering the pamphlet Covid Response Survival Kit which made claims about vaccines that University of Otago immunologist James Ussher said contained "some significant factual inaccuracies ...[and] ...there was more than enough data available to show that the vaccine was effective at preventing the spread of Covid-19, debunking one of the flyer’s central claims". Alison Campbell, a biological sciences lecturer and science educator at the University of Waikato, refuted each of the claims. Voices for Freedom told Newshub that the claims were supported with references on their website and they were "well supported by thousands of fellow New Zealanders concerned with an overzealous government response to the SARS-CoV-2 virus and the subsequent erosion of their rights and freedoms". Helen Petousis-Harris also addressed each of the claims in an opinion piece, noting as an introduction that "the 'golden rules' of propaganda are used in the flyer – it uses intense emotions, creates a dichotomy between 'good' and 'bad' and avoids data and rational discussion". In an editorial, the Otago Daily Times stated the claim by Voices For Freedom "that 'the vaccine has not been shown to stop you catching SARS-CoV-2 or passing it on to others' ...[was most damaging because] ...a wide range of studies carried out in the United States, Britain and Israel [had] found the exact opposite". The editorial concluded: "It is all the more important to use free speech to challenge the likes of Voices For Freedom when its positions threaten to derail the national effort for life to return to a pre-Covid normal."

When several people who lived in the town of Timaru expressed "dismay at the unsolicited pamphlet", a local health expert said that "as the Covid-19 vaccination programme ramps up towards the second half of the year we expect to see an increase in deliberate misinformation ...we can protect ourselves and our loved ones from this by sharing and re-sharing the reliable sources of information such as [what is on] the IMAC (Immunisation Advisory Centre) and Unite Against Covid-19 websites". In the same news item, University of Otago Faculty of Law Professor Andrew Geddis, who researches constitutional and public law, said that while "people do have a right to believe and say manifestly wrong things – it shouldn't be illegal to go around telling everyone that the world is flat, for instance ...the difference here is that if these anti-vax messages get currency, they could undermine our vaccination effort and this will hurt us all collectively in a way that some people believing the earth is flat will not". There was a mixed response from residents in Central Otago following a drop of the pamphlets in that area. One said the information was "dangerous", while another stated it was good to see an "alternative view to the [government] narrative". Mark Smith, director of Central Otago Health Services Limited (COHSL), voiced the support of his organisation and the local hospital for the current vaccination process and referred people to the Ministry of Health website for information.

Siouxsie Wiles described some of the leaflets dropped into letterboxes by groups such as Advance NZ and Voices for Freedom as containing "distressing lists of so-called facts that are designed to frighten people into not taking the vaccine ...[and these groups are taking] ...disinformation created overseas and repackaging it to make it appeal to people in New Zealand and to promote their agenda, which on the surface seems to be to erode our trust in each other, our government, and our successful response to the pandemic".

When Deeks claimed Voices for Freedom had raised $50,000 toward the printing of flyers, Mark von Dadelszen, a lawyer specialising in not-for-profit law, incorporated societies and charitable trusts, warned about donating to an organisation that was not required to publicly release financial statements, and therefore lacked accountability. Deeks responded that voluntarily published annual accounts by VFF would be likely to show incoming funds and outgoing expenses.

=== Formal complaints ===
On 5 May 2021, it was reported that the Advertising Standards Authority had accepted four complaints about flyers that had been distributed by Voices For Freedom. Deeks said that the group had planned the flyer "and it was well-timed to coincide with the government's new vaccine programme". As reported in the press on 10 June 2021, The Advertising Standards Authority largely upheld the complaints. Its ruling acknowledged, that while the disclaimer stating: 'The information on this leaflet is educational only and does not constitute medical or legal advice' identified Voices for Freedom as an "advocacy organisation", the leaflet was in "breach of principles including social responsibility, truthful presentation, and rules governing advocacy organisations communications".Deeks said she strongly disagreed with the decision and that the group would be undeterred with its "plans for future leaflet drops".

== See also ==
- Timeline of the COVID-19 pandemic in New Zealand
- Social impact of the COVID-19 pandemic in New Zealand
- Pseudoscience
