= Nancy E. Lane =

American rheumatologist

Academic background
- Education: BS, 1976, University of California, Davis; MD, 1980, UCSF School of Medicine

Academic work
- Institutions: University of California, Davis; San Francisco General Hospital

Nancy E. Lane is an American rheumatologist. She is an Endowed Professor of Medicine, Rheumatology, and Aging Research at the University of California, Davis and director of the UC Davis Musculoskeletal Diseases of Aging Research Group. She has also sat on the editorial boards of Nature Reviews Rheumatology, Rheumatology, Seminars in Arthritis and Rheumatism, Arthritis & Rheumatology, and The Journal of Rheumatology. Her work on aging and glucocorticoids in cell populations is internationally recognized.

== Early life and education ==
Lane earned her Bachelor of Science degree from the University of California, Davis (UC Davis) and her medical degree from the UCSF School of Medicine.

== Career ==
Upon completing her medical degree, Lane became an associate professor of medicine at the University of California, Davis where she treated patients at the San Francisco General Hospital. In 2012, Lane received "mastership" status from the American College of Physicians and was later elected a member of the Institute of Medicine. During the same year, she was the recipient of a California Institute for Regenerative Medicine stem cell grant for her project targeting osteoporosis. Lane led a research group in developing a clinical trial to test a synthetic molecule that directly transplanted mesenchymal stem cells. The following year, Lane was responsible for establishing a specialized research center at UC Davis to "explore the sex differences related to osteoporosis, carpal tunnel syndrome, osteoarthritis, and kyphosis." In 2017, she was elected a Fellow of the American Association for the Advancement of Science for her "distinguished contributions to research in the epidemiology and genetic composition of and therapies and treatments for women’s musculoskeletal disorders, including osteoarthritis and osteoporosis."

While at UC Davis, Lane focuses on the treatment of patients with osteoporosis, specifically glucocorticoid-induced osteoporosis aetiology. She has also sat on the editorial boards of Nature Reviews Rheumatology, Rheumatology, Seminars in Arthritis and Rheumatism, Arthritis & Rheumatology, and The Journal of Rheumatology. In 2020, Lane was appointed to sit on the Medical and Scientific Advisory Board of the non-profit organization American Bone Health.
