= Social impact of the COVID-19 pandemic in New Zealand =

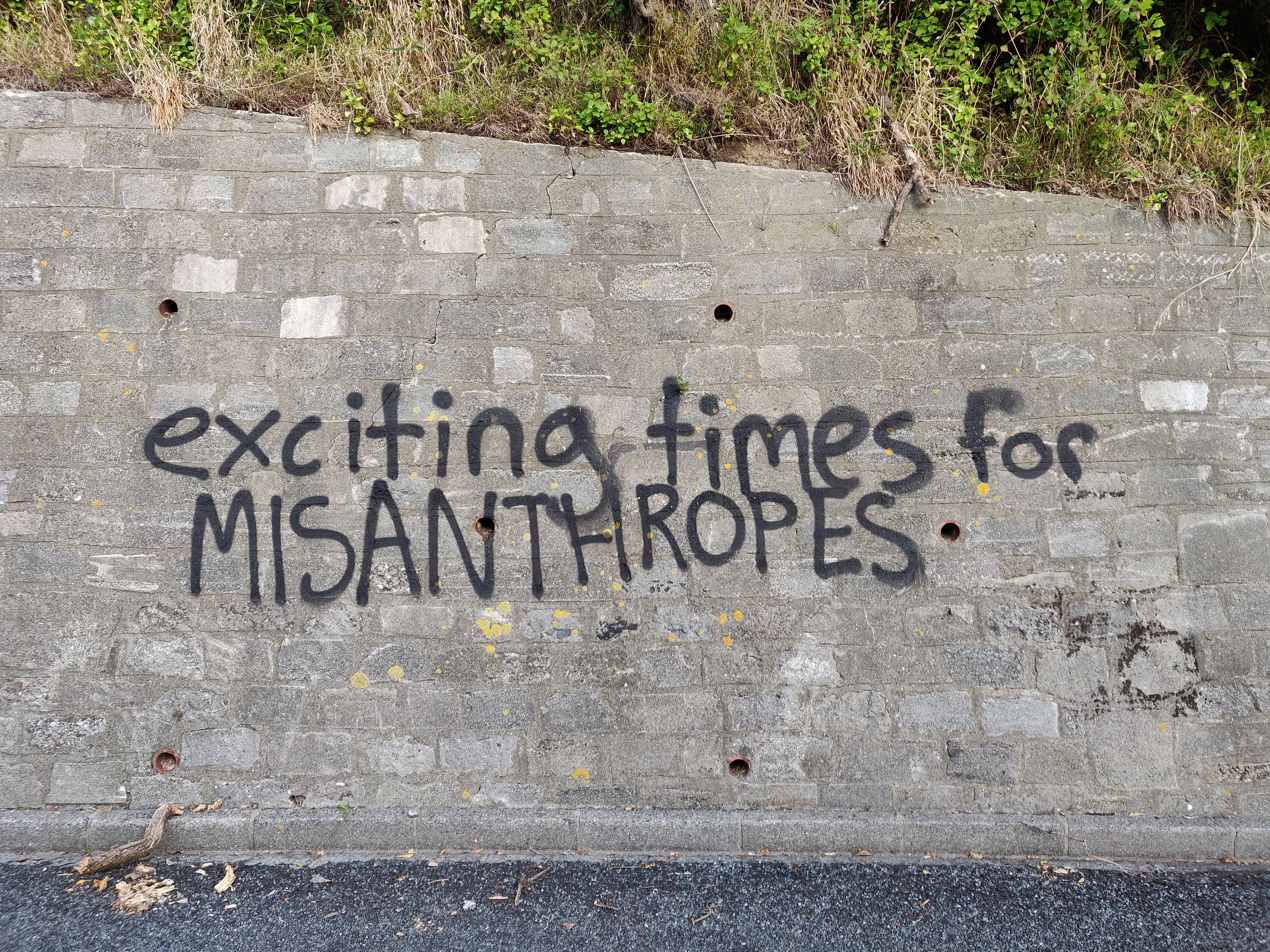
COVID-19-related graffiti reads "exciting times for misanthropes" in Island Bay 2 April 2020

The COVID-19 pandemic in New Zealand has had far-reaching consequences on the country that went beyond the spread of the disease itself and efforts to eliminate it, including education, faith communities, Māori, mass gatherings, sports, recreation, and travel. In addition, there were several recorded cases of lockdown violations, leaks, and misinformation about the COVID-19 virus and vaccines.

== Education sector responses ==
=== Primary and secondary schools ===
==== 2020 ====
On 17 March 2020, Logan Park High School in Dunedin closed for 48 hours after one of its students tested positive for the coronavirus.

On 23 March, several schools in Auckland including Marist College, Randwick Park School and Glendowie College closed after several teachers and parents tested positive for the coronavirus. That same day, the Teaching Council of Aotearoa New Zealand called on the Government to shut down all schools immediately. In response to a spike of cases and the upgrading of New Zealand's coronavirus Alert Level to Level 3, the Government closed down all schools and early childhood centres.

On 13 May, Education Minister Chris Hipkins announced that the end-of-year high school National Certificate of Educational Achievement (NCEA) external exams would be postponed from 6 to 16 November 2020.

On 26 August, Auckland's Secondary Principals' Association announced that secondary schools were planning catch-up classes and holiday lessons for students whose education had been affected by the city's lockdown.

On 8 September, St Dominic's Catholic College in Auckland's Henderson suburb announced that it would shut down for a "deep clean" for three days after it was reported that a student tested positive for COVID-19 that same day.

On 16 September, Chapel Downs Primary School in Auckland's Manukau suburb closed for the rest of the week after a student tested positive for COVID-19.

On 9 November, Ōtorohanga College closed down its hostel after health authorities confirmed that a traveller from Wellington who had tested positive for COVID-19 had visited the facility while travelling through Ōtorohanga and Kawhia in the Waikato region.

==== 2021 ====
In mid-February 2021, Papatoetoe High School in Auckland's Papatoetoe suburb closed after a Year 9 student was identified as one among three new community cases. In addition, five teachers and 28 students at the school were identified as close contacts of the infected student while all other students and staff at the school were considered "casual" contacts. By 17 February, two more Papatoetoe students had tested positive for COVID-19, with the younger sibling being a close contact of the index case.

On 23 June 2021, Whitby Collegiate in Porirua closed for the rest of the week after confirming that eight staff members had visited the Museum of New Zealand Te Papa Tongarewa on 19 June around the same time as an Australian visitor who later tested positive for COVID-19. These staff members had visited Te Papa in order to prepare for a senior school ball.

During the Delta variant community outbreak in mid–August 2021, several cases were reported at schools in Auckland including Avondale College, Pukekohe High School and Western Springs College.

On 25 August, the Ministry of Education and TVNZ relaunched a home learning television channel "Home Learning TV/Papa Kāinga TV" to provide learning support for parents in response to the lockdown following the Auckland Auckland community outbreak. The channel will be hosted on TVNZ's DUKE +1 daytime schedule from 9am to 1pm. Hosts include Suzy Cato and Karen O'Leary.

On 26 August, the Ministry of Education announced that National Certificate of Educational Achievement (NCEA) achievements at high schools would be delayed by two weeks to 22 November due to the disruption caused by the Level 4 lockdown that month. The Education Ministry has also indicated that they might reintroduce Learning Recognition Credits depending on how long the lockdown lasted. The Secondary Principals' Association and several principals and secondary students welcomed the delay of NCEA exams. While many secondary students welcomed the postponement of NCEA exams, the sisters Ruby and Lucy Reid opposed the changes on the grounds that it would cause students more stress and disrupt the plans of students working summer jobs. They organised a petition calling for the New Zealand Qualifications Authority (NZQA) to reconsider the decision. By 28 August, this petition had attracted 22,000 signatures.

On 17 September, Education Minister Chris Hipkins confirmed that there would be no changes to end of the year school holiday dates across the country including Auckland. The Government ruled out extending the length of Term Four since this was the period at the end of the school year when most school students would be most tired. This announcement came following calls by the National Party's education spokesperson Paul Goldsmith to move the school holidays forward.

In mid-September, the Ministry of Health did not allow school students in Auckland (which was then under Level 3 restrictions) to return to board schools in other regions. Parents have complained that these schools are no longer providing remote learning, causing their children to miss out on school. Radio New Zealand estimated that about 150 families the in Auckland's Pukekohe suburb were affected by these travel restrictions. There were also reports of delays of students experiencing delays in getting their border exemptions processed by authorities. In mid-September, Otago Boys High School in Dunedin confirmed that it was working with health authorities to investigate whether a boarding student from Auckland had traveled without seeking a travel exemption.

In mid-October, the Government announced that secondary schools in Auckland would reopen on 26 October for Year 11 to Year 13 students. Several principals including Whangaparāoa College principal Steve McCracken and Albany Senior High School principal Claire Amos expressed concern about the Government's decision to reopen schools amidst spreading community transmissions.

In late October 2021, Hipkins confirmed that Education officials are aiming to reopen primary and intermediate schools in Auckland for Year 1 to Year 8 students by 15 November. However, he also clarified this was only an "indicative date" based on "events closer to the time" in Auckland. The National Party education spokesman Paul Goldsmith has called for Auckland primary and intermediate schools to be reopened immediately.

On 10 November, Hipkins announced that all students in the Auckland and Waikato regions would be able to return to school from 17 November. Year 9 and 10 students would be able to return on a fulltime basis while most students in Years 1–8 would be returning part-time.

In mid-November 2021, the private education provider Villa Education Trust announced plans to establish an online private school, issuing a recruitment call to both vaccinated and unvaccinated teachers. The Trust's academic adviser Alwyn Poole attributed the launch of the private school to the shift towards online learning following the August 2021 pandemic and providing a career pathway for teachers who had chosen not to get vaccinated and hence lost their jobs due to the Government's vaccine mandate. The online school will be run out of Mt Hobson Middle School and will cater to Years 5–13 initially. The fees will be under NZ$10,000. Poole confirmed that at least 50 families had expressed interest in the school.

In early December 2021, the Ministry of Education confirmed that more than 130 education facilities in Auckland have had a staff member or student contract Covid-19 since the start of the Delta outbreak in August 2021. This includes 56 early learning services, 45 primary schools, and 30 composite or secondary schools.

On 14 December, the Ministry of Education reported a surge in homeschooling applications from parents, rising to 3,225 applications by 8 December. As of early December 2021, 8,552 children were in homeschooling; compared with 7,749 in mid-2021 and about 1,300 in mid-2020. Auckland Home Educators director Adrian Koit attributed the growing interest in homeschooling to the long lockdown in Auckland that year and parental concerns about Government efforts to roll out vaccines to children aged over 12 years old in September 2021.

On 15 December, 11 community cases were reported at Eltham Primary School in the South Taranaki district of Eltham. South Taranaki district councillor Mark Bellringer criticised the school authorities for not closing the school following the first case.

==== 2022 ====
On 25 January, Education Minister Hipkins confirmed that the Government had ordered 5,000 air purifiers for New Zealand schools to help filter the COVID-19 air particles. The first 500 purifiers are scheduled to arrive in March while the rest will arrive in the winter of 2022. Under the red setting of the COVID-19 Protection Framework ("traffic light system") which came into effect in late January, teachers, staff, and students in Year Four and above will be required to wear approved face masks.

On 2 February, principals reported that a growing number of parents were planning to homeschool their children due to a Government mandate requiring children in Year 4 and above to wear facemasks indoors. Radio New Zealand reported that the Education Ministry had received 735 homeschooling applications in January 2022, 800 in December 2021, and 867 in November 2021. The Education Ministry had also approved 2,655 homeschool applications last year, declined 78 and was still processing 983 applications. Of these applications, 900 were from Auckland, 500 from Canterbury, and 400 in Waikato.

On 7 February, several schools across the North Island reported positive cases among their students and staff. These schools included Te Mata Primary School in Hastings' Havelock North suburb, Hamilton Boys' High School, Hamilton Christian School, Rototuna Junior and Senior High School, Melville Intermediate School and Prospect School in Auckland's Glen Eden suburb.

On 13 February, a positive case was reported at Musselburgh School in Dunedin. All Year 5 and Year 6 students at the school were identified as close contacts with families being asked to get their children tested. The school remained opened for Years 1 to 4 students.

By 18 February, several Otago and Southland schools including Carisbrook School, Bradford School, Balmacewen Intermediate School, Otago Boys' High School, Columba College, Wakatipu High School, and Gore Main School had reported positive cases.

On 22 February, King's and Queen's High Schools in Dunedin had reported positive cases. By that date, several schools in Queenstown and Gore had reported cases of COVID-19.

By 24 February, the Ministry of Education confirmed that 717 schools and early childhood centres were dealing with at least one COVID-19 case. This figure included 168 early childhood centres, 370 primary schools, 45 intermediate schools, and 134 high schools. Following the transition into phase 3 of the New Zealand Government's Omicron response plan, schools would no longer be required to identify close contacts of cases but are still required to report cases to officials.

On 25 February, Education Minister Hipkins clarified that unvaccinated children and teenagers would be allowed to participate in school sports and extracurricular activities under phase 3 of the country's Omicron response plan. He also clarified that the vaccine pass and vaccine requirement would not be required for those participating in school organised activities.

In mid–May 2022, several health experts including Amanda Kvalsvig and Michael Baker from the University of Otago urged the Government to develop a COVID-19 Action Plan to combat COVID-19 during the 2022 winter. Their proposals included mandatory mask wearing at schools, ensuring that classrooms were ventilated, and providing support and special sick leave for infected staff and students. Several teachers' unions including the New Zealand Educational Institute (NZEI), the Secondary Principals' Association, and Post Primary Teachers' Association (PPTA) expressed concerns about staff having to take time off due to COVID-19, burn-out, and post-COVID-19 illness. The NZEI President Liam Rutherford called on the Government to introduce special pandemic sick leave to due with the high number of staff isolating due to COVID-19.

By 17 June 2022, schools across New Zealand were reporting a high rate of sick leaves and a critical shortage of relief teachers due to COVID-19 and winter illnesses. The New Zealand Principals' Federation national president Cherie Taylor-Patel estimated that about 20% of the teaching workforce were absent on a daily basis. The following day, Prime Minister Ardern confirmed that she was consulting health experts on reintroducing mask mandates to schools in response to a surge of COVID-19 and seasonal flu patients at hospitals nationwide.

In late July 2022, figures released by the Ministry of Health indicated that school attendance during Term One of 2022 had plummeted to 46.1% during the Omicron outbreak in early 2022. By comparison, school attendance was 64% in Term Four of 2021, 66.8% in Term 1 of 2021, 5-/5% in Term 1 of 2020, and 72.8% in Term 1 of 2019. According to The New Zealand Herald, 120,000 students (roughly 15% of the school population) had contracted COVID-19 in March 2022.

On 25 July 2022, the leaders of ten regional principals' associations released a joint letter calling on the Government to reveal how it would help high school students pass their National Certificate of Educational Achievement (NCEA) exams. The joint letter expressed concern about the impact of the disruption of COVID-19 and the winter flu on student well-being and educational achievement. The letter also expressed concern about student disengagement and high truancy rates.

On 10 August 2022, the Associate Minister of Education Jan Tinetti announced that the Ministry of Education and New Zealand Qualifications Authority would introduce "Learning Recognition Credits" to allow high school students sitting for the NCEA exams to gain enough points to meet university entrance requirements. In addition, university entry requirements would be lowered. Tinetti stated that the extra credits were meant to address the impact of COVID-19 on school attendance, teaching, learning, and assessments during the first two terms of the 2022 school year. While the Secondary Principals' Association welcomed these learnings credits, the opposition National Party contended that these credits would contribute to the decline of educational standards and achievement in New Zealand schools.

==== 2023 ====
On 8 February, Radio New Zealand reported 28,754 cases of school truancies involving 23,522 in the 2022 school year, a 40% increase (roughly 8,6000) from 2021. 60% of truancy cases involved Māori students while 82% of the students were first-time referrals to the Education Ministry's attendance service. Principal Nathan Leith of Berkley Normal Middle School attributed the increase in school truancies to the health effects of the COVID-19 pandemic.

On 10 March, 11 health researchers including Amanda Kvalsvig and Michael Baker of the University of Otago penned an editorial in the New Zealand Medical Journal warning that the lack of COVID-19 protections in schools could cause another COVID-19 outbreak. They advocated vigorous preventative measures including mandatory face masks, good ventilation, and a well-resourced system for online and hybrid learning.

In late April 2023, the New Zealand Qualifications Authority (NZQA) reported that disruptions associated with the COVID-19 pandemic had led to a decline in the number of high school students graduating with National Certificate of Educational Achievement (NCEA) qualifications. The number of students attaining NCEA Level 1 declined from 70% in 2021 and 65% in 2022. For NCEA Level 2 students, this figure declined from 77.9% in 2021 to 74.9% in 2022. In addition, the number of students attaining NCEA Level 3 dropped from 70.5% in 2021 to 68.2% in 2022.

In June 2023, the Education Review Office released a report, entitled Long-Covid: Ongoing Impacts of Covid-19 on Schools and Learning. The report surveyed 3,052 primary and secondary school students from 98 schools, 1,209 principals, and 349 teachers from 64 schools. The report found that 68% of students felt "happy most or all of the time," compared with 61% in 2021 and 22 in 2020. 26% of teachers reported their workload was manageable while 16% of principals reported that their workload was manageable. In addition the report found that school attendance had declined among Māori (27%), Pasifika (26%), and deciles 1 and 2 (25%) students during Term 2 of 2022.

==== 2024 ====
On 5 February 2024, Rangiora High School closed for one day after 30 staff members tested positive for COVID-19. According to Principal Bruce Kearney, 80% of the infected were teachers.

=== Universities and tertiary providers ===
==== 2020 ====
On 17 March 2020, the University of Canterbury became the first university in New Zealand to recall its exchange students from overseas, stating that "Given the rapidly escalating global situation and the increasing amount of travel restrictions worldwide, and intensive consultation with our partners, [we have] made the very difficult decision to suspend our exchange programmes and recall all UC outbound exchange students, effective immediately."

On 20 March, Massey University stopped face-to-face teaching of courses that could be taught by distance. The University of Auckland suspended classes for the week of 23–27 March to allow staff to prepare for remote teaching in the event of a partial campus closure. The University of Otago in Dunedin has also shifted classes with more than 100 students online while students at the University of Canterbury have petitioned for all classes to be moved online.

On 21 March, Auckland University of Technology announced that it would be suspending teaching in response to a petition from students. The University of Canterbury also announced they could move to online learning. On 23 March, all universities suspended physical lectures and shifted to online learning in response to the Government's imposition of an Alert level 3 lockdown.

On 14 April, the Government released a tertiary support package but it was considered unsatisfactory by tertiary students and student associations. Several university halls of residence including Victoria University of Wellington and the University of Otago were criticised for continuing to charge rent from students, who had left their accommodation during the lockdown to isolate with their families. Other universities like the University of Waikato waived rent for unused accommodation. Green Party MP Chlöe Swarbrick criticised these universities' practices and successfully lobbied for a parliamentary inquiry into student accommodation.

In September 2020, the University of Auckland Vice-Chancellor Dawn Freshwater announced plans to resume on-campus teaching on 21 September. Following criticism from Director-General Bloomfield and students, the university retracted its decision and delayed plans to resume on-campus teaching until 5 October 2020.

On 12 October 2020, the Education Minister Chris Hipkins announced that the Government would be introducing a new border exemption allowing 250 international PhD and postgraduate students to enter New Zealand. These students will undergo the two-week mandatory quarantine.

On 11 November, the New Zealand Police confirmed that they were investigating an anonymous post on the controversial social media platform 8Chan by an individual claiming that they were seeking to deliberately spread COVID-19 among students taking their final year exams at the University of Auckland.

On 12 November, the University of Auckland shifted all exams at its Auckland Central campuses (City, Grafton, Newmarket, and Epsom) scheduled for Friday online following the discovery of a community transmission in the city centre.

==== 2021 ====
On 25 February 2021, the University of Otago in Dunedin called on returning students from Auckland to self-isolate in response to the Auckland February community outbreak. 650 first-year students had arrived in Dunedin for the start of the academic year.

During the Delta variant community outbreak in mid–August 2021, Auckland University of Technology experienced several COVID-19 cases. By 23 August, seven AUT students had tested positive for the Delta variant.

By 25 August, several locations at the University of Auckland including lecture theatres, the Whitaker and Waipuru residential halls, and a Munchy Mart convenience store were identified as areas of interest in the Delta community outbreak.

On 29 September, the University of Otago confirmed that it was considering implementing voluntary redundancies due to declining international enrolments, rising salary costs, an ongoing significant capital expenditure programme, and the effects of the COVID-19 pandemic.

==== 2022 ====
On 29 January, the Otago University Students' Association cancelled all large events for the Orientation Week scheduled for February 2022 due to "red light setting" restrictions limiting public gatherings to 100 people with vaccine passes.

In response to rising Omicron cases in February 2022, the University of Auckland and the University of Otago announced that lectures would be held online during the first semester. The University of Canterbury however announced that it would hold both online and physical lectures. Union of Students' Associations president Andrew Lessells stated that the rising COVID-19 cases among tertiary students was causing stress among students.

On 18 February, Stuff reported that many international tertiary students were reconsidering their study plans in New Zealand due to the country's border restrictions. Many Chinese international students who had previously been attending secondary school in New Zealand prior to the border closure in 2020 were ineligible to participate in China's gaokao college exams. JJL Overseas Education New Zealand education agent Janet Wong stated that the Government's planned reopening of the border in 2022 was "too little, too late" for many students and parents, who had decided to study in the United Kingdom, Australia, and Canada instead.

== Faith communities' responses ==
=== March 2020 lockdown ===
In mid-March 2020, several faith communities and denominations including the Catholic Church, the Supreme Sikh Society, the Church of Jesus Christ of Latter-day Saints, and LIFE church announced that they would be cancelling or reducing large gatherings and taking more health precautions in response to the Government's ban on gatherings with more than 100 people. However, Bishop Brian Tamaki's Destiny Church initially refused to close their services, with Tamaki stating that they would not let a "filthy virus" scare them out of attending church. In response, infectious diseases expert Dr Siouxsie Wiles criticised Bishop Tamaki for undermining efforts to keep New Zealanders safe.

Smaller congregations like Elim Church and C3 Church in Marlborough have halved services in order to comply with the Government's ban on gatherings with more than 100 people while the Nativity Church has set up networks to support parishioners.

On 20 March, the New Zealand Catholic Bishops' Conference declared that all public Masses would be suspended for the foreseeable future. This decision was made in line with the government's decision to cancel mass indoor events with more than 100 people.

On 29 March, it was reported that members of the exclusive Gloriavale Christian Community were not complying with lockdown measures and that daycare centres, schools, and meetings were still ongoing. The police have since announced that they are working with Gloriavale to make sure that its members abided with lockdown restrictions.

In late March 2020, there were reports that members of the Muslim community in New Zealand were having trouble accessing halal food due to the closure of butcheries, which were not deemed an "essential service" under Alert Level 4.

Under the Government's Alert Level 2 restrictions which came into force on 14 May, religious gatherings have been limited to ten persons despite the Government stating that they could have a 100-person limit. The Federation of Islamic Associations of New Zealand (FIANZ) issued a press release that New Zealand Muslims would be unable to hold their Eid prayers at mosques and community centers due to the ten person limit on private gatherings. The Catholic bishops of New Zealand have expressed disappointment with the ten-person limit, describing the measures as too restrictive. Meanwhile, Bishop Tamaki of Destiny Church has announced that his movement would be holding services in defiance of Level 2 lockdown restrictions. The New Zealand Muslim Association President Ikhlaq Kashkari has expressed disappointment that the ten person limit will prevent mosques from gathering for Ramadan. The Minister of Commoners Wesleyan Methodist Community Reverend Frank Ritchie has also criticised the perceived double standard towards faith communities.

On 25 May, the Government raised the limit on religious services from ten to 100 persons, allowing many faith communities to resume mass gatherings.

=== August 2020 Auckland outbreak ===
On 29 August, 1News reported that several members of Mount Roskill Evangelical Fellowship Church had continued to meet privately despite the Level 3 lockdown that had come into force in the Auckland Region between 12 and 30 August. Health authorities had earlier identified the church as a sub-cluster of the Auckland August cluster. On 31 August, Health Minister Chris Hipkins announced that health authorities were investigating claims that the church held meetings during Auckland's Alert Level 3 restrictions. Microbiologist Siouxsie Wiles also said that genome sequencing would be used to prove whether cases at the church were linked to the Auckland cluster. 15 COVID-19 cases have been linked to the Mt Roskill church sub-cluster.

On 10 September, several Christian leaders including Pacific Response Coordination Team chairman Pakilau Manase Lua and Wesleyan Methodist minister Frank Ritchie expressed concern about misinformation relating to COVID-19 circulating among New Zealand congregants attending churches with links to conservative evangelical and Pentecostal churches in the United States.

=== August 2021 Auckland outbreak ===
On 18 August 2021, the Central Auckland Church of Christ was identified as a location of interest during the Delta-variant community outbreak.

On 23 August 2021, the Samoan Assemblies of God Māngere church in South Auckland was identified as a location of interest. An individual who later tested positive for COVID-19 had attended a service attended by 500 people on 15 August. Other churches linked to the Auckland cluster have included St Anthony Church and St Therese Church. Health Director-General Ashley Bloomfield confirmed that church leaders were cooperating with health authorities. By 24 August, 58 cases had been linked to the Mangere Assemblies of God church members. According to Auckland councillor Efeso Collins, the predominantly Pacific Islander congregants had received racist abuse.

By 7 October 2021, 386 people linked to the Māngere church sub-cluster had tested positive for COVID-19. Following the death of a congregant on 6 October, local Samoan Assemblies of God denominational leaders including First lady Rebekah Toleafoa and church spokesperson Jerome Mika called for members to vaccinate.

In early October 2021, The Spinoff reported that several faith communities and leaders including the Hindu temple Sri Venkateswara in Wainuiomata, Temple Sinai synagogue in Wellington, the Wellington Anglican Diocese, the evangelical Christian Rice youth movement, Muslim chaplain Tahir Nawaz, and the Auckland Buddhist Centre had adopted online communications technologies including Zoom, YouTube, and WhatsApp since lockdown restrictions had made it hard for many faith communities to hold physical gatherings and meetings.

By 7 November 2021, the entire 120-member congregation of Samoan Methodist Māngere Central church in Auckland had been vaccinated due to an awareness campaign promoted by the church's Reverend Suiva'aia Te'o and youth group leaders. During Level 4 and Level 3 restrictions, the church livestreamed its services on Facebook and held Bible studies and prayer meetings via Zoom. In addition, the church ran Kahoot! quizzes and online talent shows aimed at young people.

In early November 2021, Radio New Zealand reported that many Auckland churches and leaders including GraceCity Church and Windsor Baptist Church were preparing to deliver Christmas services online due to lockdown restrictions. Radio NZ also reported that several church leaders including Windsor Park senior pastor Grant Harris, GraceCity senior pastor Jonathan Dove, and New Zealand Catholic Bioethics Centre director John Kleinsman were pondering the ethics of only admitting vaccinated people once the traffic light system comes into force. Life Church senior pastor Paul de Jong has objected to any government legislation or restrictions that would exclude people based on their vaccination status.

== Gangs ==
In early October 2021, COVID-19 Response Minister Chris Hipkins acknowledged that the Government had granted two Mongrel Mob members Sonny Fatupaito, the leader of the Waikato chapter, and life member Harry Tam essential worker exemptions to travel in and out of Auckland the previous weekend. Both men had been granted exemptions to enter Auckland to facilitate contact tracing and testing among gang members. Hipkins confirmed that several gang members were part of the August 2021 cluster. The Government's decision to give gang members travel exemptions was criticised by National Party leader Judith Collins and ACT party leader David Seymour.

== Housing ==
In late October 2021, Radio New Zealand reported that the Delta outbreak in Auckland and Waikato had worsened the country's housing crisis, leading the number of children living in motels to rise from 280 to 4,512 over the past three months. Minister of Social Development Carmel Sepuloni confirmed that there had been an increase in demand for emergency housing during the Delta outbreak, particularly in Auckland and Waikato. Sepuloni also acknowledged that COVID-19 restrictions made it harder for people to move in with family or friends while searching for a new place, others were unable to return home because of alert levels, and that family breakdowns had led to increase demand for emergency accommodation. In addition to Auckland and Waikato, there was an increase demand for emergency housing in the Gisborne District, Bay of Plenty, and Northland regions particularly Whangārei. As of 29 October 2021, the New Zealand Government has spent NZ$87.7 million on 36,330 emergency housing grants over the past three months.

== Leaks ==
In early July 2020, National Party MP Hamish Walker admitted leaking the private details of COVID-19 patients to the media. Former National Party President Michelle Boag had passed the information to Walker in her capacity as chief executive of the Auckland Rescue Helicopter Trust. Walker was stripped of his portfolios and later announced that he would not be contesting the 2020 general election. Boag, who also admitted leaking similar information to National MP Michael Woodhouse, resigned from her position with the Helicopter Trust and her membership of the National Party.

On 18 August 2020, managed isolation and quarantine deputy chief executive Megan Main confirmed that a First Security guard had leaked information about the names, room numbers, and travel itineraries of returnees staying in managed isolation at Auckland's Sheraton Four Points managed isolation facility on Snapchat. Main apologised for the privacy breach. She confirmed that the guard had been removed from duty at the hotel and that First Security was conducting an employment investigation into the guard. That same day, The New Zealand Herald reported that a man had admitted spreading a rumour on Reddit that a recent outbreak of community transmissions in Auckland in mid-August had been caused by a family member supposedly entering a managed isolation facility. This rumor was dismissed by health authorities.

== Lockdown violations ==
=== 2020 ===
After New Zealand entered into a level 4 alert lockdown on 25 March 2020, there were several reports of people violating lockdown rules by congregating in crowds. On 1 April, Ardern described 20–29 year olds as the most vulnerable demographic to COVID-19 and called on them to comply with lockdown requirements.

On 2 April, there were reports of beachgoers congregating in Auckland's Herne Bay, and Dunedin. Police visited beachgoers, warning them to comply with the lockdown, while health authorities warned about the risk of spreading the coronavirus and prolonging the lockdown. In Otago, there were reports of people jumping off the Albert Town Bridge near Wānaka. In Auckland, Tongan ethnic community leaders warned that kava clubs were still meeting despite the lockdown, with some participants posting photos and videos on social media. In Kaitaia, there were reports of locals taking matters into their own hands by establishing checkpoints to enforce the lockdown.

In early April, Health Minister David Clark was criticised for flouting official guidelines against non-essential travel after he drove to a Dunedin park two kilometres away from his home to ride a mountain bike trail. Clark later apologised to Prime Minister Ardern for not setting a good example to the public. Later, Clark admitted that he had driven his family twenty kilometres to a nearby beach in Dunedin for a walk during the first week in lockdown. Clark offered his resignation to Prime Minister Ardern, who turned it down due to his role in leading the Government's response to the COVID-19 pandemic. However, she stripped Clark of his ministerial portfolio as Associate Finance Minister and demoted him to the bottom of Labour's Cabinet list.

In early April, a Christchurch man was arrested by police after posting a Facebook video of himself deliberately coughing and sneezing on customers at a FreshChoice supermarket. Ardern warned that people would be arrested for deliberately coughing on others. The man pleaded guilty to a charge of offensive behaviour in the Christchurch District Court and was freed after serving 10 months of a 16 months' imprisonment. He received a negative test for COVID-19. The man later apologised for his actions.

On 7 April, it was reported that the New Zealand Police had recorded 291 breaches under the Civil Defence Emergency Management Act 2002 and the Health Act 1956. Of these, 263 people had been issued with warnings for breaking lockdown rules, 12 had received a youth referral, and 16 were facing charges. Clark, who was disciplined by the prime minister for violating lockdown requirements, was not listed among the 291 breaches reported. On 8 April, the Police Commissioner Andrew Coster updated the figures to 367 breaches including 45 prosecutions, 309 warnings, and 13 youth referrals. Coster also reported that police were dealing with 37,000 breaches, mainly by businesses.

On 21 April, a Queenstown man was sentenced to a concurrent sentence of one month imprisonment and two weeks' imprisonment for breaching lockdown restrictions and damaging a stainless steel toilet. In Auckland, a 32-year-old woman who allegedly spat at Auckland Transport staff on a train was charged with assault under the Crimes Act 1961. Auckland Transport has reported of incidents of stopping people trying to travel from outlying suburbs like Henderson and Takanini to shop in the city centre and groups of young people travelling on trains for non-essential reasons.

On 3 May, it was reported that Police had received 1,200 reports of people breaching alert level 3 restrictions. 686 of these reports were filed between 6 pm on 1 May and 6pm on 2 May. Police confirmed that they had taken enforcement action against 514 people for breaches of either the Health Act or the Civil Defence Emergency Act since alert level 3 came into force on midnight 28 April, prosecuting 135 and warning 342. Police Acting Assistant Commissioner Scott Fraser also announced that they had to close down hundreds of parties in the past few days since the alert level 3 lockdown came into force. He warned that illegal public gatherings would "waste all the sacrifices" others had to make to beat COVID-19.

On 18 May, Police Commissioner Andrew Coster confirmed that the Police had received 250 reports of illegal mass gatherings in the four days since alert level 2 came into effect on 14 May. These included 30 reports of people holding or attending illegal parties; 29 of which resulted in a warning and one in a prosecution.

=== 2021 ===
During an outbreak of the Delta variant in mid-August 2021, Police received 1,869 online breach notifications. Of these reports, 607 originated in Auckland, which had borne the brunt of the community outbreak. 984 of these reports were related to gatherings, 742 about a business, and 143 about individuals.

In late August, several Labour Party advertisements were distributed in Auckland, Christchurch, and Tauranga in breach of Alert Level 4 lockdown regulations. Labour Party general secretary Rob Salmond attributed the unauthorised distribution to party volunteers who had not followed the party's instructions not to deliver any brochures during the lockdown.

On 27 August, Police and paramedics in Queenstown attended to a wounded female mountain biker, who was part of a party of at least 50 mountain bikers at a Fernhill mountain biking park. In response, Police Commissioner Andrew Coster reminded the public that exercise under Alert Level Four should be restricted to one's neighbourhood and that any recreational activity that could lead to a rescue or emergency response was not permitted. By 27 August, 93 people had been charged with a total of 99 COVID-19-related lockdown offences since Alert Level 4 came into force on 17 August. By 29 August, 103 people had been charged with a total of 111 offences nationwide since the Alert Level 4 lockdown. These cases included a woman in her 20s who was carrying a forged document claiming she was exempt from wearing masks.

By 31 August, Police had arrested 19 people across the country (two in the Northland Region, four in Auckland, three in Waikato, six in Bay of Plenty, two in Whanganui, one in Christchurch, and one in Taupō) for staging anti-lockdown protests in breach of Alert Level 4 restrictions.

On 12 September, an Auckland couple named William Willis and Hannah Rawnsley flouted Alert Level 4 lockdown restrictions by using essential worker exemptions to drive to Hamilton Airport and then fly to their holiday home in Wānaka in the South Island. The Police confirmed that the couple would be prosecuted for violating Alert Level 4 restrictions. Queenstown Lakes District Mayor Jim Boult criticised the couple for endangering the health and livelihoods of local people by potentially exposing them to COVID-19. The couple attracted substantial media coverage and public debate, and also received abuse on social media. In mid-September, Police charged the couple with failing to comply with a COVID-19 health order. On 21 December, the couple pleaded guilty to failing to abide with a COVID-19 public health order, which carries a penalty of up to six months' imprisonment or a NZ$4000 fine. Judge Bruce Davidson ordered Willis to pay a NZ$750 fine and cover court costs while Rawnsley was discharged without conviction but ordered to donate NZ$500 to a charity working with vulnerable people.

On 14 October, an Auckland man was charged with traveling to Wānaka in breach of COVID-19 lockdown restrictions. That same day, two Auckland sex workers were arrested for traveling to Blenheim in the South Island without a travel exemption.

In mid–July 2022, Auckland senior solicitor Umar Kuddus was convicted by Judge John McDonald of violating lockdown travel restrictions by making an illegal trip to Hamilton in September 2021. At the time, Kuddus did not have a work or personal exemption to travel out of Auckland. Kuddus came to the attention of his fellow lawyers and Police after he posted several social media posts boasting of his travel activities and willingness to breach lockdown restrictions in force at the time. In addition to the lockdown breach conviction, Kuddus was fined NZ$900 and ordered to pay NZ$130 in court costs.

In early September 2022, Radio New Zealand and The New Zealand Herald reported that conflicting information by two government departments had led three COVID-19 positive women to travel to the Northland Region in October 2021, which triggered an 11-day lockdown. The Police and former Deputy Prime Minister Winston Peters had made inaccurate statements about the women being affiliated with gangs or involved in prostitution, which had caused them to receive significant abuse. The women's travel activities had led the Police to initiate an investigation known as Operation Hiking, which involved 75 police personnel and an extensive search of CCTV, bank records, phone record, calls and text messages.

== Māori responses ==
=== 2020 ===
A Wellington iwi placed a taupāruru (restriction) on the practice of hongi, a traditional Māori greeting, in response to the outbreak.

On 24 March, former Tai Tokerau Member of Parliament Hone Harawira announced that local iwi in the Far North were working with local authorities and Mayor of Far North John Carter to set up roadblocks to prevent foreign tourists from travelling into the area. Tourists in the area would be encouraged to leave the Far North. Roadblocks were set up at State Highway 1 at Whakapara and State Highway 12 at Waipoua. Harawira criticised the Government for not stopping tourists from entering the country prior to the border closure. By 26 March, at least three groups of tourists had been stopped from entering the Far North. A testing centre was also set up at Waiomio Hill to test locals returning from overseas. Having set up illegal road blocks to stop people from bringing the virus into the Far North, Hone Harawira broke Level 4 Lockdown restrictions to make a 600 km round trip to Auckland, then a virus hot spot, on 12 April. Harawira claimed that the purpose of the trip was to obtain medical supplies and visiting his sister was unimportant.

Similar measures were put in place on the East Cape area of the North Island. In April, there were reports that iwi checkpoints in the central North Island, East Coast, and Northland were obstructing essential travel by local residents. National Member of Parliament for Northland Matt King said that constituents had complained about being verbally abused and spat upon at iwi checkpoints in Northland. In response, Police Minister Stuart Nash warned that the police would take action against "illegal" checkpoints that had been set up without police support while allowing checkpoints in remote towns as long as they had the support of the local police and community.

In early May 2020, Newshub reported that the iwi Te Whānau-ā-Apanui in the eastern Bay of Plenty region had been operating an unauthorised travel permit system to protect the region's elderly population, horticulture, and agricultural industries. This included a requirement for essential workers to provide a letter from the Ministry for Primary Industries proving that their travel complied with lockdown rules, which were eased when Alert Level 4 came to an end on 28 April. On 6 May, the New Zealand Police clarified that community road block operators in the Bay of Plenty did not have the authority to turn away New Zealanders lacking the necessary travel documents.

=== 2021 ===
On 26 January 2021, members of a Northland iwi including Reuben Taipari and Hone Harawira established a Tai Tokerau Border Control in response to a recent community transmission in the region. The checkpoint's purpose was to educate visitors and travellers about COVID-19 including the South African strain. On 28 January, the police shut down the checkpoint on the grounds that there was no official requirement for it. In response, Harawira criticised the lack of COVID-19 testing facilities north of Whangarei over the long weekend and advocated the cancellation of the Waitangi Day public festivities scheduled for 8 February.

According to Ministry of Health figures released on 4 October 2021, Māori and Pacific peoples were disproportionately affected by the Delta variant outbreak in Auckland in August 2021; accounting for 97 and 103 of the 263 active cases. By contrast, Asians accounted for 23 of the active cases, the Middle Eastern, Latin American, and Africa (MELAA) community 28, and Europeans 12. Māori intellectual and researcher Dr Rawiri Taonui expressed concerns that the lifting of restrictions could affect vulnerable communities. He also said that "marginalised groups" such as people in gangs and transitional housing were less likely to cooperate with testing and vaccination campaigns due to their adverse experiences with schools, the justice and healthcare systems.

In mid November 2021, several members of the New Zealand Māori Council including Archdeacon Harvey Ruru and Tā Edward Durie filed an application for an urgent inquiry by the Waitangi Tribunal into the Government's COVID-19 response for Māori. The plaintiffs claimed that the Government's plan to move New Zealand to the "traffic light system" and eliminate the Auckland border in December would put Māori at risk. The claimants also took issue with the Government's 90% eligible vaccination threshold and the lack of pediatric vaccines.

In early December 2021, Harawira announced that the Tai Tokerau Border Control would be revived to screen travellers from Auckland heading to the Northland region following the launch of the COVID-19 "traffic light system" and the planned opening of the Auckland regional border on 15 December. Northland district commander Superintendent Tony Hill confirmed that joint Police and iwi checkpoints would be established at State Highway 1 in Uretiti and State Highway 12 near Maungaturoto before transitioning to random checkpoints and spot checks across the region. Police Commissioner Andrew Coster also confirmed that Police would be working with local iwi volunteers to ensure that travelers were fully vaccinated or had returned a negative COVID-19 test within the past 72 hours. The Border Control checkpoints were criticised by several political figures including ACT party leader David Seymour, former New Zealand First leader Winston Peters, former NZ First Member of Parliament Shane Jones, and National Party leader Christopher Luxon on the grounds that they restricted people's movements, economic activities, promoted division, and questioned their effectiveness. In response, Labour deputy leader and Te Tai Tokerau Member of Parliament Kelvin Davis claimed that criticism of the iwi-led checkpoints was motivated by racism against Māori.

On 21 December, the Waitangi Tribunal ruled that the Government's vaccination rollout and "traffic light system" breached the Treaty of Waitangi's principles of active protection and equity. The Tribunal took particular issue with the Government's decision to prioritise those aged over 65 years and those with health conditions rather than implement a lower age threshold for Māori, who had a more youthful population and more health vulnerabilities than European New Zealanders/Pākehā. The Tribunal also ruled that the Government's transition to the "traffic light system" failed to take into account the lower Māori vaccination rate and health needs. The Tribunal also found that Government had not consulted adequately with Māori health providers and leaders and that efforts to address Māori needs such as the "Māori communities Covid-19 fund" were inadequate. The Waitangi Tribunal recommended that the Government improve data collection, improve engagement with the Māori community, and provided better support for ongoing vaccination efforts, testing, contact tracing, and support for Māori infected with Covid-19.

== Mass gatherings and protests ==
On 19 March 2020, the Royal New Zealand Returned and Services' Association announced that all Anzac Day services, scheduled for 25 April, would be cancelled and the red poppy collection postponed due to the health risk. This was the first time that Anzac Day services have not been held since 1916.

Following a spate of community cases in Auckland in mid-February 2021, Napier's Art Deco Festival and Auckland's Gay Pride parade were cancelled. Auckland's Splore festival was postponed to 26–28 March 2021.

On 20 August 2021, a thousand people who had attended the Mitre 10 2021 Awards ceremony at Auckland's Spark Arena on 12 August were ordered to self-isolate after a bar worker later tested positive for COVID-19. Notable participants have included TVNZ broadcaster Hilary Barry.

From 1 September 2021, the Ministry of Health eased Level 4 restrictions to allow funeral viewings by family and whanau at a funeral home provided they were from the same bubble. Prior to that, public funerals and gatherings had not been allowed under Alert Level 4. This change came as a result of lobbying from funeral directors and Pasifika community leaders who stated that the ban on funerals during lockdowns was traumatic for families.

On 10 November 2021, Economic and Regional Development Minister Stuart Nash announced that the New Zealand Government would subsidise the costs of big events over the 2021–2022 summer break facing potential pandemic disruptions under its event transition support scheme. This decision was welcomed by Gibbston Valley concert general manager Dean Calvert and Rhythm and Alps festival director Alex Turnbull, who said that they felt confident to proceed with their events with the knowledge that losses caused by public health decisions could be covered.

Due to concerns about community cases of the SARS-CoV-2 Omicron variant in January 2022, the annual Auckland Rainbow Pride Parade and the Bluff Oyster Festival were cancelled. After the Government placed the country under "red setting" restrictions including limits on social gatherings on 23 January 2022, Prime Minister Jacinda Ardern postponed her wedding a second time.

New Zealand Defence Force (NZDF) Chief Air Marshal Kevin Short ordered military personnel not to attend the 2022 public ANZAC Day commemorations to reduce the risk of spreading COVID-19. On 8 April, Short reversed his earlier decision barring military personnel from participating in ANZAC Day events. However, he ordered military personnel to following health protection protocols including mask wearing and not participating in "after-functions" and "ad-hoc groups."

=== George Floyd protests ===
On 1 June 2020, Black Lives Matter (BLM) solidarity protests were held in several major centres including Auckland, Wellington, Christchurch, Dunedin, Tauranga, Palmerston North and Hamilton in response to the murder of George Floyd, which had sparked a wave of protests and riots in the United States and around the world. 4,000 people attended the Auckland rally alone, which saw participants marching from Aotea Square down Queen Street to the American Consulate General. In Wellington, hundreds gathered outside Parliament. According to media reports, there was little social distancing due to the large volume of participants.

Microbiologist and health adviser Dr. Siouxsie Wiles, Deputy Prime Minister Winston Peters, and ACT Party leader David Seymour have criticised march participants for flouting Level 2 lockdown restrictions. Dr Wiles called for people who attended the BLM marches and gatherings to self-isolate for 14 days. Peters and Seymour criticised participants for violating Alert Level 2 lockdown restrictions and undermining efforts to eliminate COVID-19, while calling on the Government to move towards Alert Level 1. Prime Minister Jacinda Ardern has criticised protesters for violating Level 2 restrictions in the midst of a global pandemic, while expressing sympathy for George Floyd. Police Minister Stuart Nash also indicated that New Zealand Police are not seeking to prosecute protesters while expressing disappointment that social distancing rules had been flouted. Opposition Leader Todd Muller has criticised the Government for sending mixed messages about COVID-19 alert levels, alleging that they caused the public to become complacent about social distancing, citing the BLM rallies as an example.

In response, Christchurch BLM protest organiser Will Hunter defended his decision to hold the rally, which attracted 700 people. He also said that he and his fellow organisers had urged participants to take health precautions including wearing gloves, masks, social distancing and staying at home if sick.

=== Anti-lockdown protests ===
Following a second community outbreak in Auckland in August 2020, several anti-lockdown protests were staged across several New Zealand urban centres including Auckland, Whangārei, Wellington, New Plymouth, Tauranga, Rotorua, Nelson and Christchurch. Key figures and groups involved in these protests included FACTS NZ, the Kotahitanga Movement Aotearoa, the Liberty March Movement, Advance New Zealand party co-leader Jami-Lee Ross, New Conservative Party deputy leader Elliot Ikilei, and New Zealand Public Party leader Billy Te Kahika. Besides opposition to COVID-19 lockdown and vaccination policies, protesters also expressed opposition to 5G technology, 1080 usage, the United Nations, water fluoridation, and Communist China.

Following a third community outbreak in Auckland in August 2021, a second-wave of nationwide protests were staged in Auckland, Nelson, Tauranga, Christchurch, and Dunedin in mid-August and October 2021. Besides Te Kahika, other key figures and groups involved in the protests included far right activist Kyle Chapman, Bishop Brian Tamaki of the fundamentalist Destiny Church, The Freedoms & Rights Coalition (TFRC), and Dunedin city councillor Lee Vandervis. In response, Police filed charges against Te Kahika and Tamaki for breaching public health orders and the COVID-19 Public Health Response Act 2020.

== Migrants ==
=== 2020 ===
On 24 March 2020, the New Zealand Government automatically extended all temporary visas with an expiry date of 2 April to 9 July 2020 inclusive who were in New Zealand on 2 April 2020 until 25 September 2020. Travellers whose visas expire before 1 April are allowed to remain if they are unable to leave the country.

On 13 May 2020, Deputy Prime Minister Winston Peters urged migrant workers who were out of work to go home, stating that New Zealand taxpayers could not afford to support them. Peters confirmed that 50,000 migrant workers had already returned to their home countries after the New Zealand Government made arrangements with embassies to organise repatriation flights for their nationals. According to a declassified official document, there were over 383,000 foreign nationals in New Zealand including students, migrant workers, and partners or dependents of workers as of 30 March.

According to a 1News report on 17 May 2020, there were over 1,000 Recognised Seasonal Employer scheme workers in New Zealand, mostly from the Pacific Islands. Pacific Response Coordination Team chairman Pakilau Manase Lua has stated that about 1,000 Tongan seasonal workers in NZ are facing financial difficulty due to the loss of work caused by the economic upheaval caused by the COVID-19 pandemic.

On 3 June 2020, Radio New Zealand reported that half of the Government's $30 million emergency welfare fund had been spent over a month, with many of the recipients including stranded migrant workers and foreigners who were unable to return to their countries due to the disruption of international travel. Under the Civil Defence Emergency Management Act, financial assistance for food, transport, clothing and accommodation is available to anyone regardless of their citizenship. Civil Defence Minister Peeni Henare has confirmed that there have been 4,500 requests for emergency assistance from the Otago region with an unknown number from the Auckland Region. Immigration Minister Iain Lees-Galloway has stated that the "labour market test" will be applied on foreign workers once their work visas have expired.

On 7 July 2020, the Immigration Minister Iain Lees-Galloway extended 16,500 Essential Skills and Work to Residence workers with visas by six months and extended the 12-month stand-down period for migrant workers who were going to leave in 2020 until February 2021. This stand-down period shift would benefit about 600 lower-skilled visa holders including dairy workers.

On 22 July 2020, Radio New Zealand reported that a six year old Korean child had been unable to attend school since his father, a temporary visa holder, was unable to return to New Zealand due to lockdown travel restrictions. Under New Zealand law, international students under the age of ten are unable to attend schools without the presence of a parent or guardian. Despite lobbying by National MP Melissa Lee on behalf of the family, Education Minister Chris Hipkins declined to intervene, citing policy issues.

On 20 November 2020, the Government announced that emergency benefits will be available for people on temporary work, student or visitor visas who cannot return home or support themselves from 1 December 2020. Social Development and Employment Minister Carmel Sepuloni also confirmed that emergency benefits would be available to assist people with their basic needs while they tried to return home if they could not find work. Under the Ministry of Social Development's emergency benefits programme, eligible temporary visa holders received $251 a week for a single person and $375 a week for a solo parent. However, temporary visa holders were ineligible for extra payments available to residents including the accommodation supplement.

On 21 December 2020, Immigration Minister Kris Faafoi announced a six-month extension for employer-assisted work and working holiday visa holders along with their partners and children in order to address the country's labour shortage. In addition, a 12-month stand-down period for low-paid Essential Skills visa holders working in New Zealand for three years will also be suspended until January 2022.

=== 2021 ===
On 16 March 2021, it was reported that the New Zealand Immigration and Protection Tribunal had rejected a Filipino family's appeal against a deportation notice. During the COVID-19 pandemic, the father had used false addresses to claim $1,600 worth of food vouchers in order to feed his family due to their difficult financial situation. In mid April 2021, the Philippines Embassy appealed to Immigration New Zealand to reconsider the deportation order and also lodged a formal complaint with the Ministry of Foreign Affairs and Trade. On 24 December, the Associate Immigration Minister Phil Twyford granted the father (identified as Jeffrey Santos) a character waiver and extended the family's visas, allowing them to stay for another year in New Zealand.

On 10 May 2021, the Unite Union and Migrant Workers Association submitted a 15,000-strong petition calling on the Government to give residency to long-term migrant works and visa overstayers. Unite Union representative Mike Treen claimed that the COVID-19 pandemic offered New Zealand an opportunity to address long-standing problems with the country's temporary migration system. On 14 May, the Federation of Aotearoa Migrants staged a protest outside of Parliament. The Federation has demanded two main objectives: residency visas for those on temporary work visas who would normally be eligible for residency, and the phased re-entry of people stuck overseas who are separated from their families. Protesters heckled the Minister of Immigration Kris Faafoi and criticised the Government's border restrictions.

In late August 2021, the Ministry of Social Development terminated its emergency benefits programme for migrants. This decision was criticised by New Zealand International Students' Association (NZISA) president Afiqah Ramizi and migration think tank The Fair Initiative founder Charlotte te Riet Scholten-Phillips for neglecting the socio-economic needs of international students and temporary visa holders. Afiqah stated that many students were dependent on their overseas families for financial support while Scholten-Phillips argued that migrants paid the same taxes and should be allowed benefits due to the economic hardship caused by COVID-19. In addition, the Government declined to renew the NZ$1 million International Student Hardship Fund, which provided grants to education providers and other organisations to provide financial relief, food parcels, living support payments, and cash payments to international students.

On 30 September 2021, Immigration Minister Kris Faafoi announced that the Government would provide a one-off simplified residency pathway known as the "2021 resident visa" for migrants on work visas residing in New Zealand and their families. Faafoi estimated that 165,000 migrants including health, aged care, primary industry, teachers, construction, and manufacturing workers would be eligible for the 2021 resident visa programme, which will be rolled out in two phases in December 2021 and March 2022. However, visitors, students, working holiday makers, and Recognised Seasonal Employer seasonal workers won't be eligible for the scheme.

== Misinformation and disinformation ==
In mid-March 2021, The New Zealand Herald reported that a COVID-19 denial group called "Voices for Freedom" had teamed up with the Advance New Zealand party to distribute a magazine called The Real News promoting conspiracy theories about the COVID-19 pandemic and vaccines, generally repeating discredited internet-based sources. The Real News is published by Full Courts Press director and shareholder Jonathan Eisen and his wife Katherine Smith, whose company has published the pseudoscientific The New Zealand Journal of Natural Medicine and the conspiracy theory–promoting Uncensored magazine. By 12 March, at least 60,000 copies of the magazine had been distributed to postboxes. By May 2021, Voices for Freedom and the Advance New Zealand party had raised NZ$10,000 to print and distribute 60,000 copies of The Real News. In late April, a second issue of The Real News was circulated.

In mid-May 2021, Voices for Freedom co-founder Claire Deeks claimed that her organisation had raised NZ$50,000 towards printing two million virus "fact flyers" which it intended to distribute nationwide. In response, University of Otago clinical microbiologist and immunologist James Ussher criticised the flyers for spreading disinformation about the Pfizer–BioNTech COVID-19 vaccine and undermining public trust. Meanwhile, lawyer Mark von Dadelszen cautioned against donating to Voices for Freedom since it was neither a registered charity nor an incorporated society with a formal structure.

In mid-June 2021, Secretary for Education Iona Holsted warned that schools were being targeted by opponents of the national vaccination programme. The Ministry of Education expressed concern that school leaders were not addressing misinformation in school bulletins and that some principals were expressing opposition to vaccination. The Ministry also urged educators to use "appropriate sources" for verified information.

In August 2021, North & South magazine contributor Emanuel Stoakes reported that some local Chinese language media particularly the Chinese Herald and the website SkyKiwi were promoting disinformation about the effectiveness of Western COVID-19 vaccines in comparison to Chinese vaccines. East Auckland doctor David Wu identified the Chinese social media platform WeChat as key source of vaccine misinformation and pro-Beijing propaganda among the Chinese community in New Zealand. Political scientist Anne-Marie Brady urged the New Zealand Government to monitor Chinese language channels and provide Chinese-speaking New Zealanders with greater access to COVID-19 information in their own language to combat disinformation.

In mid-September 2021, Dunedin City councillor Lee Vandervis attracted media and public attention and after he published several COVID-19–related social media posts questioning the effectiveness of the Pfizer–BioNTech COVID-19 vaccine and advocating the use of the anti-parasitic drug Ivermectin for treating COVID-19.

In late October 2021, several Jewish New Zealander leaders including Holocaust Centre of New Zealand chair Deborah Hart, New Zealand Jewish Council spokesperson Juliet Moses, and Zionist Federation of New Zealand leader Rob Berg criticised anti-vaccination advocates including Billy Te Kahika for likening the Government's lockdown and vaccination mandate policies to the Nazi Holocaust and persecution of Jews. Several Jewish community figures including Hart and Holocaust survivor Sami Cohen have criticised anti-vaccination advocates for re-appropriating the yellow Star of David and likening the Government's COVID-19 mitigation and vaccination policies to Nazi Germany and the Holocaust.

In early November 2021, the University of Auckland's Te Pūnaha Matatini's The Disinformation Project released a working paper examining COVID-19 misinformation and disinformation since the Delta outbreak began on 17 August 2021. The paper found that far right online communities in New Zealand and abroad were using various social media platforms including Telegram to spread disinformation about COVID-19 vaccines and lockdown policies through the use of memes, emotional testimonies, and Māori motifs and symbols. The paper also argue that anti-lockdown and anti-vaccine elements were reappropriating Māori motifs and symbols such as the hīkoi and United Tribes of New Zealand flag to exploit racial tensions. The paper argued that far right elements were using COVID-19 and vaccination as a Trojan horse for promoting far right ideologies in New Zealand on a range of issues including gun control, anti-Māori sentiment, homophobia, transphobia, conservative family values and structures, misogyny, and immigration.

== Pacific communities ==
In response to the Auckland February community outbreak in late February 2021, Left-wing blogger Martyn Bradbury has advocated that the Government declare an amnesty for overstayers and provide compensation payments to people unable to work from home in order to help the Pasifika communities in South Auckland.

By 24 August 2021, Director-General of Health Ashley Bloomfield confirmed that Pasifika had accounted for over 50 percent of cases in the country's Delta variant outbreak that had begun on 17 August. In response, Pacific Response Coordination Team chair Pakilau Manase Lua called for more community-led organisations such as churches to lead their own vaccination rates. Pasifika have the highest levels of testing in New Zealand but have the lowest vaccination rate within the population. That same day 58 cases had been linked to the Samoan Assemblies of God church in Māngere, whose congregants received racist abuse. Auckland councillor Efeso Collins claimed there was a racist double standard against Pasifika while the Ministry of Health condemned racism against the Pasifika community.

On 28 August 2021, South Seas Healthcare's youth hub Bubblegum mobilised 50 Pasifika youths in Auckland to aid in frontline work including the distribution of food boxes to families in the Samoan Assemblies of God church cluster, connecting with their peers, helping the elderly to get vaccinated, and provide the 0800 Pasifika vaccination helpline with second language options.

== Political responses ==
From late 2021, the opposition ACT and National parties called for the Government to abandon its lockdown and elimination policies. In late September 2021, ACT party leader David Seymour released a "COVID 3.0 strategy", which advocated "harm minimisation" strategy in place of elimination. Seymour also advocated the abandonment of lockdown policies in favour of isolating infected individuals and easing border restrictions for travelers from low risk countries.

On 29 September, National Party leader Judith Collins released a "Three Pillars" plan including a ten-step plan for boosting New Zealand's response to COVID-19, setting a 70–75% vaccination target for ending lockdowns, and an 85–90 percent target for ending border restrictions. Collins also called for an abandonment of the Government's elimination strategy and criticised the state of the country's managed isolation and quarantine (MIQ) system.

On 11 October 2021, New Zealand First leader Winston Peters criticised the Government for failing to prevent a COVID-19 breach in the Northland Region involving a sex worker, which had led to the reinstatement of Alert Level 3 lockdown restrictions in the region.

On 11 October, the Māori Party objected to the Government's efforts to lift COVID-19 lockdown restrictions due to lower vaccination rates among Māori in comparison to other ethnic groups. The Māori Party also opposed the Government's plan to reopen the borders once 90% of the population had been vaccinated, claiming that it would amount to "modern-day genocide."

In mid–November, ACT New Zealand leader David Seymour advocated for a regular testing regime for unvaccinated workers in place of the Government's vaccine mandate for education, health and hospitality workers.

In early December 2021, National Party leader Christopher Luxon called for the immediate lifting of Auckland's border restrictions with Northland after The New Zealand Herald reported that the Ministry of Health had proposed that the Auckland border should be lifted in tandem with the country's transition into the "traffic light system" on 3 December. However, Prime Minister Ardern and COVID-19 Response Minister Hipkins had opted to retain Auckland's border until 15 December to minimise the risk of community transmissions and boost regional vaccination rates.

In early February 2021, Luxon advocated that rapid antigen testing be conducted in schools twice a week for both students and teachers, following the example of New South Wales and Victoria. There are approximately over 800,000 students and 70,000 teachers scattered over 2,000 schools in New Zealand. In addition, Luxon advocated reopening New Zealand's borders and ending the managed isolation and quarantine (MIQ) system in favour of home isolation on a staggered basis for New Zealanders and travellers who tested negative for COVID-19. That same day, Māori Party co-leader Debbie Ngarewa-Packer called for the Health Ministry to improve its daily COVID-19 updates, citing a delay in the reportage of Omicron cases in Hāwera.

In mid March 2022, Luxon and the National Party's COVID-19 Response Spokesperson Chris Bishop called for the Government to scrap the COVID-19 Protection Framework, pre-departure testing, My Vaccine Pass checks except for large indoor events, requirements for NZ COVID Tracer app QR code scanning, and the elimination of vaccine mandates for persons under the age of 18 years. The National Party also called for the COVID-19 isolation period to be reduced to five days. Luxon claimed that QR code scanning and vaccine pass requirements did not make sense while Bishop said that the vaccine pass requirements prevented unvaccinated people from participating in community activities including sports.

== Sports and recreation ==
Following the implementation of stronger border controls, SANZAAR announced on 14 March 2020 that it would suspend play of its Super Rugby season (which features five New Zealand teams) following the conclusion of that weekend's matches.

On 15 March, it was announced that the Warbirds Over Wanaka 2020 airshow was cancelled due to the Government's response to the pandemic.

On 15 February 2021, the Halberg Awards celebrating New Zealand sports champions from the past decade was postponed due to Auckland shifting to Alert Level 3 as a result of three community transmissions detected in Papatoetoe the previous day.

On 23 June 2021, Wellington's Museum of New Zealand Te Papa Tongarewa has closed for two days for deep cleaning after an Australian tourist who visited the museum and its Surrealist Arts Masterpieces exhibit tested positive for the SARS-CoV-2 Delta variant. In addition, 2,500 people who visited Te Papa Museum at the same time as the tourist were asked to go into self-isolation for between five and 14 days, depending on the part of the Museum they were visiting.

On 29 August 2021, the Government relaxed Alert Level 4 restrictions to allow whitebaiting and fishing. Prior to that, only Māori customary fishing rights were permitted under Level 4.

== Threats ==
In February 2021 the Chinese consulate in Auckland was affected by a phony bomb threat made by individuals on an events website Aucklife that they had hacked, where they also made similar threats against the Chinese consulate in Sydney, Australia. Their motive was reportedly a punitive response against China for allegedly causing the pandemic. As a result, a physical search was conducted at the consulate by New Zealand's Police Specialist Search Group while Aucklife owner Hailey Newton had since regained her access to the website.

== Travel and repatriation ==
Dominion Road in Auckland at 7 am on a Wednesday

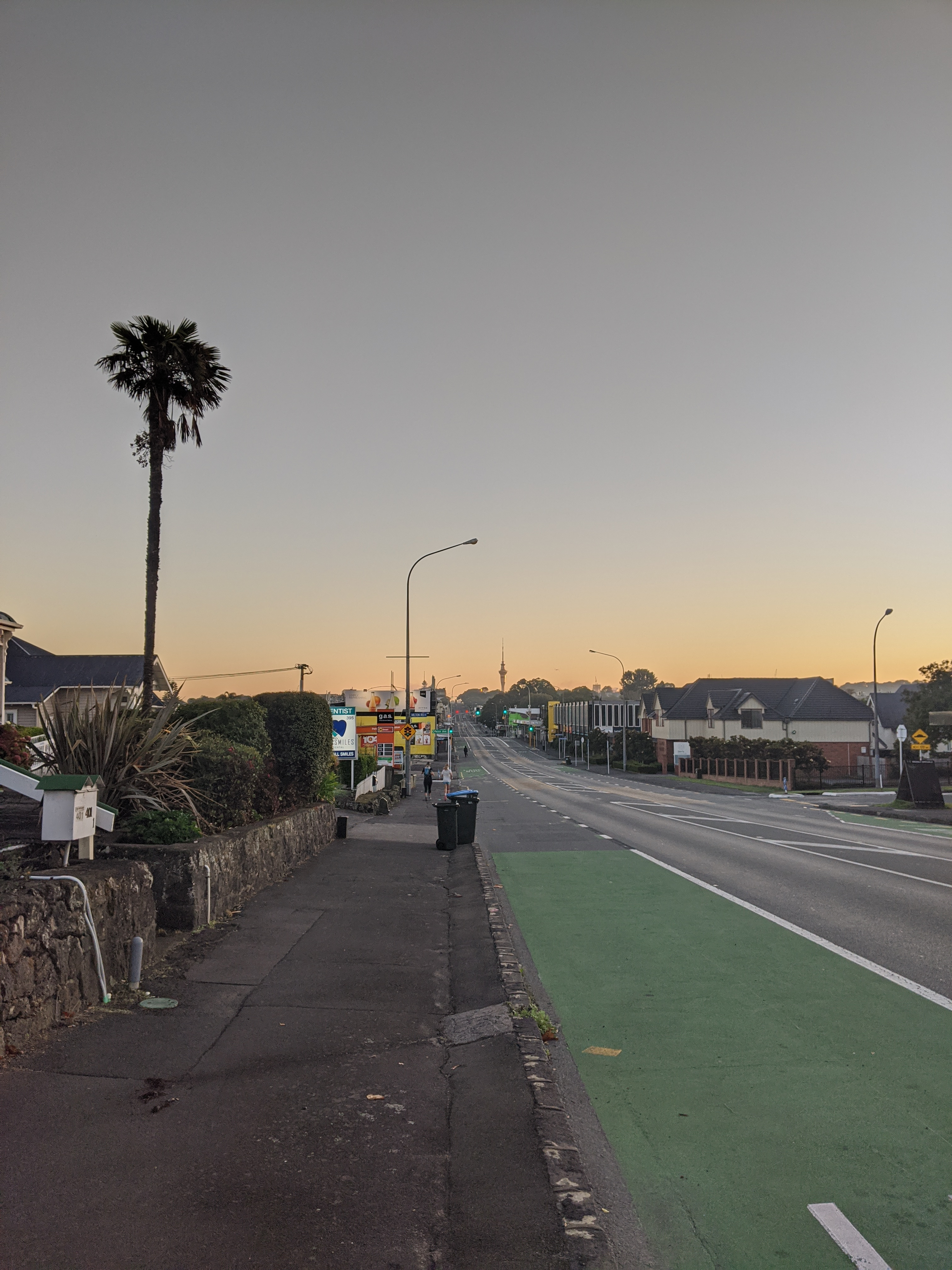
Level 4 lockdown

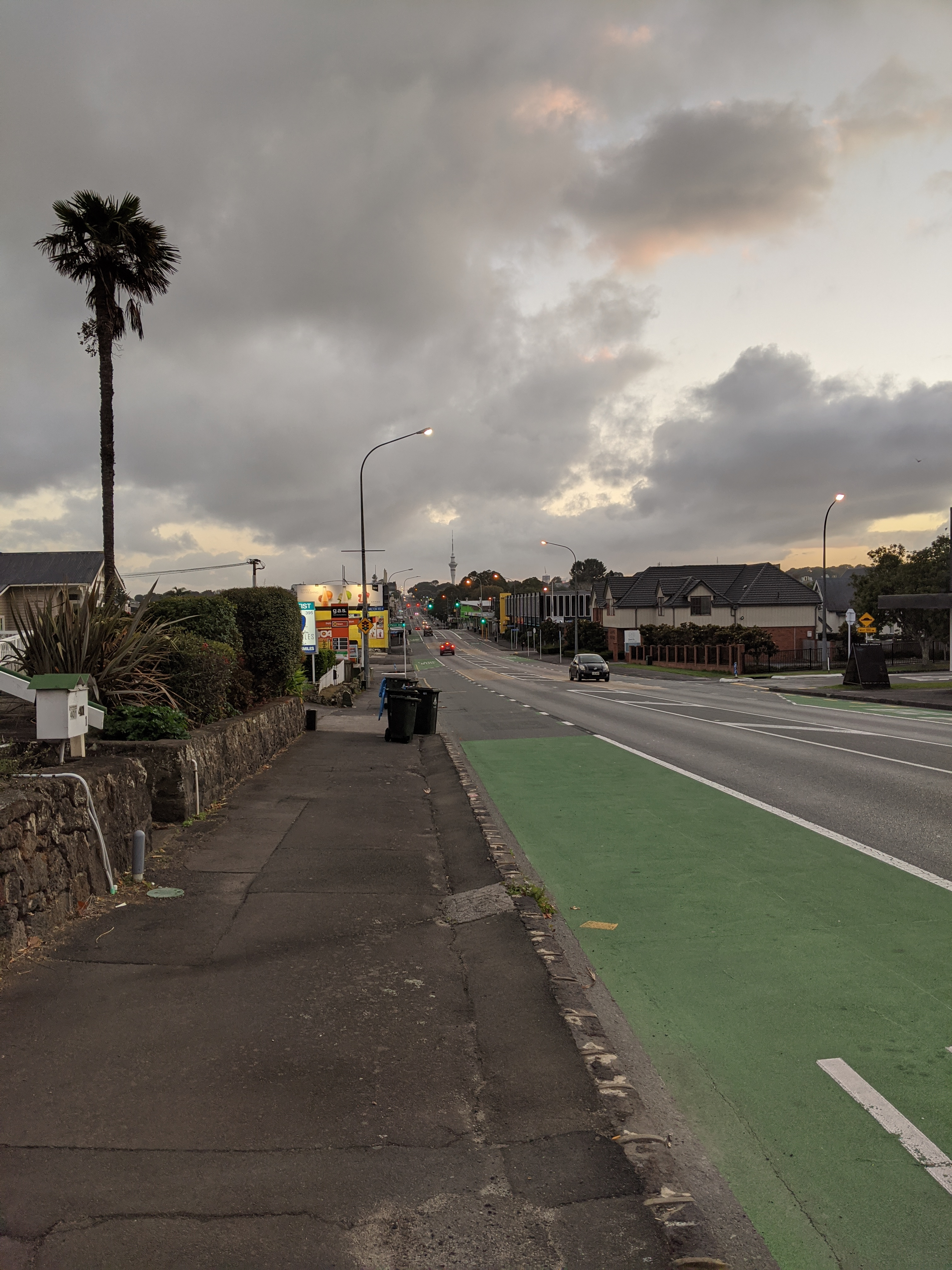
Level 3 lockdown

=== Domestic travel ===
Following the Delta community outbreak in mid–August 2021, the Police were criticised by Northland Māori iwi and leaders including former politician Hone Harawira for not immediately erecting fixed checkpoints between Northland and Auckland after the country moved into an Alert Level 4 lockdown. The Level 4 announcement on 17 August had triggered an influx of people and vehicles from Auckland into the Northland region. Other Northland residents criticised inconsistencies in the location of Police checkpoints near the Brynderwyn Hills, Kaiwaka and Mangawhai which inhibited travel by residents to access essential services like groceries. Police defended the location of the checkpoints on the grounds of safety to their staff and convenience for essential workers who were still permitted to travel.

On 31 August 2021, The New Zealand Herald journalist Anna Leask reported that several airports including Wellington Airport and Christchurch Airport had established separate Alert Level 3 and Level 4 zones to accommodate travellers from different parts of the country during the Delta August 2021 outbreak. Queenstown Airport has suspended flights until Alert Level 2. The Government has also restricted travel across alert level boundaries to the following activities including accessing health services and justice institutions; caring for pets or other animals; collecting someone from Managed Isolation and Quarantine (MIQ) and airports; emergencies, going home (from Level 3 to Level 4 only); leaving or relocating homes on a court order; leaving New Zealand; personal travel through Level 4; providing care or support for a person in a critical or terminal condition; and shared childcare arrangements or urgent care of a child.

On 1 September 2021, it was reported that two university students from Auckland had breached COVID-19 lockdown rules by flying from Auckland on separate flights to Dunedin and Wellington. In response, Police issued fines and infringement notices to both individuals. COVID-19 Response Minister Chris Hipkins described the breaches as disappointing and said that more checks should have been carried out at airports.

On 16 September 2021, the New Zealand Ministry of Health announced that all essential workers crossing the Auckland border from 17 September will have to show proof that they have had a COVID-19 test in the previous seven days.

On 6 October 2021, COVID-19 Response Minister Chris Hipkins acknowledged that the Government had granted Sonny Fatupaito, the leader of the Mongrel Mob's Waikato chapter, an essential worker exemption to travel in and out of Auckland the previous weekend. Fatupaito had been granted an exemption in order to assist the Government's efforts to convince gang members to get tested and vaccinated against COVID-19.

=== New Zealand citizens and residents ===
In early February 2020, eleven New Zealanders were reported to be on board the cruise ship Diamond Princess, which had been quarantined by Japanese authorities in Yokohama after passengers were confirmed to have COVID-19. By 20 February, four New Zealand passengers had tested positive for the virus and were being treated in Japan. The remaining six passengers returned to New Zealand via an evacuation flight being organised by the Australian government. Upon arriving in Auckland, they were quarantined at a military facility at Whangaparāoa.

In February 2020, the New Zealand Government used a chartered Air New Zealand flight to evacuate 193 passengers from Wuhan, China, including 54 New Zealand citizens, 44 permanent residents, 35 Australians, and several Pacific Islands nationals. 35 Australian passengers were transferred to an Australian flight, while the remaining 157 passengers were quarantined in a military facility at Whangaparaoa for 14 days. The passengers were released on 19 February.

On 17 March, Newshub reported that the Australian Border Force had suspended the repatriation of New Zealand deportees between 16 and 30 March 2020 as a result of the coronavirus outbreak.

On 19 March, Foreign Minister Winston Peters announced that the New Zealand Government was considering more mercy flights to evacuate New Zealanders stranded overseas in response to the spread of the pandemic to Europe, North America and other international locations. On 24 March, Prime Minister Jacinda Ardern urged New Zealanders abroad to return home with while recognising that many will not be able to return home due to the disruption of international travel. Peters urged New Zealanders stranded overseas to considering sheltering "in place". He estimated there were 80,000 New Zealanders stranded overseas, of whom 17,000 had registered with the Ministry of Foreign Affairs and Trade's "Safe Travel" programme.

On 28 March, it was reported that about 24 New Zealanders were stranded in Peru because they could not board a chartered Australian flight due to changes in Australian transit rules requiring overseas travellers to transit on the same day as their arrival.

On 29 March 108 New Zealanders were allowed to disembark from the cruiser liner Vasco Da Gama, which had been berthed at Fremantle, Western Australia, for two weeks. Following the cancellation of the cruise, the passengers had been stranded aboard the cruise ship for two weeks. The passengers were repatriated to Auckland on an Air New Zealand flight.

On 30 March, Australian Prime Minister Scott Morrison announced, following negotiations with Prime Minister Ardern, that New Zealanders in Australia, who held a Special Category Visa, would be eligible for AU$1,500 fortnightly payments as hardship assistance. Many New Zealanders had been forced to return after being unable to access Australian Centrelink payments.

On 6 April 2020, Peters announced that the Government had organised a mercy flight to rescue New Zealanders stranded in Peru. The flight will depart from Lima, with an added domestic connection in Cusco. Private tour operators Viva Expeditions and Chimu Adventures will also help transport New Zealanders to the appropriate pickup points. New Zealand authorities have also managed to gain permission from Chilean authorities to transit through Santiago. According to the Ministry of Foreign Affairs and Trade, there are 22,000 New Zealanders stranded overseas who have registered with MFAT's Safe Travel.

On 10 April, the Uruguayan government announced that it would be repatriating 16 New Zealanders and 96 Australians who had been stranded aboard the Antarctic cruise ship Greg Mortimer in the La Plata river near Montevideo since 27 March. The passengers would be flown from Montevideo to Melbourne. On 12 April, the mercy flight carrying 16 New Zealanders landed in Melbourne. Thirteen of the New Zealanders boarded a New Zealand Government-chartered flight to Auckland while three New Zealanders, who were resident in Australia, stayed behind.

On 15 April, a Government-chartered LATAM Airlines flight carrying New Zealanders who were stranded in Peru arrived back in Auckland. Other passengers who had been scattered in Brazil and Chile were able to board when the flight transited through Santiago. Passengers were to be quarantined in Auckland per new quarantine requirements. The mercy flight carried 60 Australians and three New Zealanders. One New Zealand woman elected to stay behind with her Peruvian husband after he failed to meet Immigration New Zealand's partnership visa requirements. On 21 April, it was reported that a 49-year-old man, who was meant to be on the Peruvian mercy flight, had died in Cusco from COVID-19, making him the first New Zealander recorded to have died from it overseas.

On 15 April, it was announced that Fiji Airways would be flying stranded New Zealanders from Fiji to Auckland on 17 April. The return flight would leave the same day, carrying Fijians back to Nadi.

On 13 April, Peters announced that the New Zealand Government was in discussions with airlines and international partners to bring New Zealanders stranded in India back to New Zealand. On 21 April, Education Minister Chris Hipkins announced that the Government was repatriating 1,600 New Zealanders from India to managed isolation in Auckland, Wellington, and Christchurch.

On 21 June, it was reported that 4,272 people who had returned from overseas travel were being housed in 20 managed isolation facilities across New Zealand, including 18 in Auckland and Christchurch and two in Rotorua. These facilities are being run by the National Emergency Management Agency. Several returnees complained about lack of communication from ministry officials about their quarantine destinations, including several who had been transferred from Auckland to Rotorua without any prior notice. On 21 June 232 people had returned from Australia and entered into quarantine. That same day, it was reported that a man who had returned from the United Kingdom had been trapped in limbo at Grand Mercure Hotel in Auckland after health authorities lost his COVID-19 test.

On 12 July, it was reported that the Government would be establishing a special isolation facility for returning New Zealanders who had been deported from Australia after the Australian Government resumed its deportation policy in late June 2020. According to 1News, 19 New Zealanders are scheduled to return from various Australian detention detentions in the coming week via a chartered flight. By 28, July at least 30 deportees had arrived from Australia on two chartered flights in July. They were quarantined for 14 days at the Ramada hotel in Auckland.

In September, Sehion Tours and Travels has organised several chartered flights from southern India to Auckland using a Singapore Airlines A350-900. Besides transporting New Zealand citizens and residents, the company is also repatriating Indian nationals who want to return to India.

In late December 2020, Radio New Zealand reported that several New Zealanders living in the United Kingdom were seeking help from the Government to return home due to travel restrictions caused by a new strain of COVID-19, which had forced the British Government to reimpose lockdown restrictions and other countries to bar entry to travellers from the UK.

In late April 2021, several media including Radio New Zealand and Stuff reported that several New Zealand citizens had become stranded in India as a result of surge in COVID-19 cases there. Many had been unable to return to New Zealand due to a temporary travel ban in April and travel restrictions limiting entry from India to citizens, partners, and their children. In addition, several transit countries had also banned flights from India. Despite calls for repatriation flights for New Zealanders stranded in India, COVID-19 Response Minister Chris Hipkins confirmed that the Government had to "make tough decisions" to protect New Zealanders from the virus.

On 8 May 2021, the United Kingdom Government confirmed that New Zealand would be added to England's "green list" of countries eligible for quarantine free travel from 17 May 2021. Prior to 17 May, New Zealand has remained on England's "amber list"; with travellers being required to quarantine at home for ten days and undergo two COVID-19 tests after their arrival.

On 9 May 2021, the Ministry of Foreign Affairs and Trade confirmed in response to an Official Information Act request that the Government had spent NZ$6 million to repatriate New Zealanders who had been stranded overseas at various locations including Wuhan, India and Peru since the start of the pandemic.

On 5 July, Prime Minister Ardern confirmed that the transtasman travel bubble pause with Australia will be lifted for Western Australia and the Northern Territory from 11:59 pm on 9 July but will remain in place for Queensland and New South Wales. New Zealanders stranded in Australia will be able to return to NZ from 11:59 pm on 9 July provided they meet a range of travel requirements.

On 19 July, COVID-19 Response Minister Chris Hipkins confirmed that the travel bubble pause with the Australian state of Victoria would be extended by two days until 21 July after the state confirmed 13 new community cases and extended its lockdown.

On 23 July, Prime Minister Ardern suspended the transtasman travel bubble with Australia from 11:59 pm that night for the next eight weeks due to the spread of the SARS-CoV-2 Delta variant in several Australian cities and states. New Zealanders who return home from Australia except New South Wales before 11:59 pm on 30 July will not have to go into managed isolation. Those returning after 30 July will have to go into managed isolation.

On 11 August, the Strategic Covid-19 Public Health Advisory Group led by Professor David Skegg advocated taking a phased approach towards reopening New Zealand's borders in 2022 once a majority of New Zealanders had been vaccinated. Under proposed plans, travellers could avoid going into managed isolation based on risk factors such as their vaccination status and the state of the pandemic in their country of origin. Other proposals include pre-departure testing for travellers and rapid testing for travellers upon entry to New Zealand.

On 21 October, the Government confirmed that repatriation flights carrying New Zealand citizens who had been deported from Australian under Section 501(3A) of the Australian Migration Act 1958 would resume in November following a three-month hiatus. The Government has contracted a designated MIQ facility to host these returnees.

On 24 November, Hipkins confirmed that fully vaccinated New Zealanders and other eligible travellers from Australia would be able to travel to New Zealand without going through managed isolation from 17 January 2022. This MIQ exemption will be extended to fully vaccinated New Zealanders and other eligible travellers from other countries from 14 February 2022.

On 3 February 2022, the Government announced plans to reopen the country's borders. From 11:59pm on 27 February, New Zealanders and other eligible travellers from Australia would be able to enter the country after self-isolating for ten days. From 11:59pm on 3 March, New Zealanders from all over the world and other eligible temporary visa holders were allowed to enter the country after self-isolating for five days.

=== Foreign travellers and temporary visa holders ===
On 25 March 2020, the British and German governments announced that they will be sending mercy flights to repatriate stranded citizens in New Zealand, many of whom are tourists. The German government has made arrangements for sending mercy flights to Auckland and Christchurch. The British Government has made arrangements for British nationals to transit through Singapore during their return from New Zealand. There have been reports of British travellers being charged high airfares by airlines. The British High Commission and consular services in Wellington have been criticised for closing their operations the previous week.

On 31 March, Malaysian Deputy Foreign Minister Kamaruddin Jaffar stated that 153 Malaysians with return tickets were stranded in New Zealand but unable to return to Malaysia due to travel restrictions and disruption caused by the pandemic.

In early April, Deputy Prime Minister Winston Peters, following communications with foreign governments including Denmark, announced that foreign nationals returning home would be classified as engaging in essential travel able to travel domestically (whether by air or land) when they have a confirmed and scheduled international flight out of New Zealand, subject to Government requirements. In addition, foreign governments would be allowed to evacuate their citizens in charter flights provided they satisfied New Zealand health requirements. To improve travel between New Zealand and Europe, the Government has also approved a second daily flight between Doha to Auckland by Qatar Airways.

As of 10 April, German airliner Lufthansa has flown 16 repatriation flights from Auckland Airport to Germany, Switzerland, and Austria, evacuating 6,700 passengers. On 14 April, it was reported that Qatar Airways would be flying a Boeing 777-300 via Perth to pick up stranded French nationals in Christchurch before returning to Paris.

On 10 July, the Government announced that overseas-based victims of the Christchurch mosque shootings would be granted special border passes and financial help in order to travel to New Zealand for the duration of the gunman's sentencing, which begins on 24 August.

On 9 September, the Government announced that it would be increasing the number of categories of non-citizens and non-residents eligible for the new border exception. These include those holding a job or operating a business in New Zealand; holding a work to residence or essential skills visa, have departed New Zealand on or after 1 December 2019; and have lived in New Zealand for at least two years with a residence or work visa. Partners who are Australian citizens or from visa-waiver countries will also be eligible to apply for border exceptions. In addition, those who have been unable to enter the country to activate their residency visa or unable to return before their residency visa expires will receive a reprieve.

In late September, it was reported that three German yachties had defied New Zealand's COVID-19 laws by sailing from Tahiti to Opua, Northland despite having their application for a border exemption denied by Immigration New Zealand. After being tested and quarantined on their vessel for 14 days, the three returned to Germany on 1 October and are subject to a travel ban from New Zealand. While Immigration New Zealand defended their decision, Rear Commodore Guy Chester of the Ocean Cruising Club expressed concerns about the plight of hundreds of yachties stranded in the Pacific, who were unable to dock in New Zealand and Australia due to COVID-19 border restrictions.

By 12 October, it was reported that 10,400 individuals had been granted exemptions for critical and essential work to enter New Zealand.

On 13 November, it was reported that Prime Minister Ardern had granted a business exemption for a British family to enter New Zealand following the death of their son Eddie in French Polynesia in April 2020. The family had initially been denied entry into New Zealand but the Prime Minister had sought a review of the case after the Weekend Herald reported on the family's situation on 10 October.

On 28 May 2021, Radio New Zealand and Stuff reported that the Government had spent $112,000 out of a $900,000 allocation to repatriate migrants who could not afford flight tickets back to their home countries during the pandemic. In addition, the Government had spent $11 million on attracting migrants during the pandemic. In addition, the Government had spent $242 million in February 2021 to address a deficit in immigration's visa account finances, which still left a $56 million deficit.

On 28 October, COVID-19 Response Minister Hipkins announced that international arrivals would have to isolate for seven days from 14 November in an effort to free up about 1,500 rooms a month. From 8 November, fully vaccinated travellers from low risk Pacific Island countries such as the Cook Islands were granted quarantine-free travel to New Zealand.

On 24 November, Hipkins announced that all fully vaccinated foreign travellers will be able to enter New Zealand without undergoing managed isolation from 30 April 2022. In addition, Hipkins confirmed that the "Very High-Risk" classification for Indonesia, Fiji, India, Pakistan, and Brazil would be eliminated from December 2021; allowing travellers from these countries to enter New Zealand on the same basis as other international travellers. However, Papua New Guinea remained classified as "Very High-Risk," limiting direct travel to New Zealand citizens and residents.

On 13 December, Digital Economy and Communications Minister David Clark announced that 600 technological workers (including software and application programmers, ICT managers, ICT security specialists and multimedia specialists) and 290 agricultural workers (including mobile plant machinery workers, shearers, and wool handlers) would be granted border exemptions from early 2022 to fill skills shortages in the New Zealand economy.

On 21 December, the Government removed all remaining countries from its "Very High-Risk country list" but delayed the reopening of the border until late February 2022 due to rising Omicron community cases.

On 3 February 2022, the Government announced that eligible foreign travellers and temporary visa holders would be able to enter the country in a five-stage process. From 11:59 pm on 27 February, eligible travellers from Australia would be able to self-isolate for ten days. From 11:59pm on 13 March, eligible travellers including skilled and work visa holders would only need to isolate for seven days. From 11:59pm on 12 April, other temporary visa holders including international students and critical workers would only need to isolate for seven days. From July, anyone traveling from Australia as well visa-waiver travellers would be allowed to enter the country. By October, the border would be fully reopened to all visa categories.

On 28 February 2022, the New Zealand Cabinet accelerated the reopening of New Zealand's borders. From 11:59pm on 2 March, all vaccinated travellers were allowed to enter the country without self-isolating. From 11:59 pm on 4 March, all New Zealanders and eligible critical workers would be allowed to enter the country. From 13 March, most temporary visa holders including working holiday visa holders and Recognised Seasonal Employer workers were allowed to enter the country without having to self-isolate.

On 3 May 2022, the Government eased travel restrictions to allow unvaccinated visa holders, permanent residents, and Australian citizens residing in New Zealand to enter the country without undergoing managed isolation. That same day, the Ministry of Business, Innovation and Employment announced that all four remaining MIQ facilities would close by August 2022 due to the declining volume of users. In early May, tourism operators expressed concerns that the Government's pre-departure COVID-19 test requirements was deterring tourists from traveling to New Zealand.

On 11 May, the Government accelerated the reopening of New Zealand's borders. From 16 May, visitors from the Pacific Islands could apply for visitor visas. From 4 July, all work visa holders would be allowed to enter New Zealand. From 31 July, all visitor and student visa holders would be able to enter the country. In addition, the country's maritime border would open to cruiser ships on 31 July.
