= Sarah Onuora =

Canadian rheumatologist

Sarah Onuora is a Canadian rheumatologist and the chief editor of Nature Reviews Rheumatology.

== Education ==
Onuora has a bachelor's degree in biology from McMaster University, Canada.

== Career ==
In 2005 she worked in the editorial department of Rheumatology journal and she joined Nature Publishing in 2007, initially working on Nature Reviews Neurology before becoming a senior editor at Nature Reviews Rheumatology. She became the chief editor of Nature Reviews Rheumatology in 2015.

=== Selected publications ===
- New insights into RA genetics from GWAS meta-analysis, Nature Reviews Rheumatology, 17, 128 (2021). https://doi.org/10.1038/s41584-021-00580-8
