= Reality Check Radio =

New Zealand internet radio

- New Zealand

Programming
- Language: English
- Format: Current affairs, news

Ownership
- Owner: Claire Deeks and Alia Bland

History
- First air date: March 2023; 3 years ago

Links
- Website: realitycheck.radio

Reality Check Radio (RCR) is a New Zealand internet radio station owned by activist group Voices for Freedom (VFF). Notable hosts have included former ACT Party leader Rodney Hide, former TVNZ broadcaster Peter Williams and anti–vaccine mandate influencer Chantelle Baker. The station has promoted anti-woke, anti-transgender content, COVID-19 vaccine hesistancy, and climate change denial. In April 2024, the station went off air due to financial problems, leading to a fundraising campaign led by host Williams. They reached their fundraising target in early May and resumed streaming services shortly after.

== Content and programming ==
Notable RCR hosts include former ACT Party leader Rodney Hide, former TVNZ broadcaster Peter Williams, anti-vaccine influencer Chantelle Baker, former Radio New Zealand broadcaster Paul Brennan, VFF activist and local councillor Jaspreet Boparai, former Federated Farmers president Don Nicolson, alternative music content creator Tobias Tahi, knitter Maree Buschke, former Green Party candidate Natalie Cutler-Welsh, Alistair Harding, right-wing blogger Cameron Slater, Maree Buscke and Tane Webster.

Notable guests on RCR have included New Zealand First leader Winston Peters, NZ First MPs Shane Jones and Tanya Unkovich, ACT Party leader David Seymour, ACT MP Cameron Luxton, anti-vaccination activist Dr Matt Shelton, and National Party ministers Mark Mitchell and Erica Stanford.

Reality Check Radio has promoted anti-woke, anti-transgender content, COVID-19 vaccine hesitancy, and climate change denial. Stuff journalist Charlie Mitchell, Auckland University of Technology (AUT) head of journalism Greg Treadwell and AUT researcher Danielle Selman Julian have described Reality Check Radio along with The Platform and Centrist as part of a wave of "anti-establishment media" that emerged in New Zealand during the post-COVID-19 period as a "backlash" against traditional media coverage of cultural and political issues.

== History ==
In March 2023, Voices for Freedom launched an online radio station called Reality Check Radio. The group's three leaders Claire Deeks, Alia Bland and Libby Jonson each owned a 1/3 stake in the company, which was registered as NZ Media Holdings 2023 Limited.

According to The Spinoff journalist Duncan Greive, Paul Brennan had previously helped establish Sean Plunket's online radio station The Platform. Rodney Hide had served as a guest on The Platform but had parted company after Plunket and Platform co-founder Wayne Wright Jr. shifted the station's focus away from covering COVID-19 vaccination issues. According to Stuff journalist Charlie Mitchell, Reality Check Radio's launch in March 2023 was greeted by animosity from some elements of the "truth and freedom movement." Counterspin Media's founder Kelvyn Alp posted on Telegram "big money behind the push to be mediocre without a real challenge to the establishment." Anti-vaccination activists Liz Gunn and Sue Grey criticised RCR for not covering their court case.

In late February 2024, Reality Check Radio hosted Austrian far-right activist Martin Sellner, who had communicated with and accepted a donation from Brenton Tarrant, who perpetrated the 2019 Christchurch mosque shootings. During the interview, Sellner condemned Islam, asylum seekers and burqas. The RCR host described Sellner as a patriot who wanted to "preserve culture." Following the interview, advocacy group Fight Against Conspiracy Theories (FACT) spokesperson Stephen Judd criticised RCR for platforming extremist views and called on politicians to boycott the station. ACT leader David Seymour disagreed with FACT, saying that he talked to a "wide variety of media outlets, even niche ones like Stuff. Having a range of voices in the media can only be a good thing." He also called FACT a "left-wing lobby group."

In early April 2024, The New Zealand Herald reported that Reality Check Radio had gone off air due to financial problems. Hosts Peter Williams and Rodney Hide fronted a 14-minute public relations video calling for donations to the support RCR's operations. According to BusinessDesk, RCR had struggled to secure enough donations from listeners, with only one percent of listeners donating. Rival The Platform co-founder Plunket questioned whether the donation was a marketing ploy and derided RCR as "rabbit hole radio," promoting Williams to accuse Plunket of jealousy motivated by competition. On 14 April, Voices for Freedom co-founder Alia Brand denied that the RCR donation drive was a publicity stunt during an interview on current affairs show Q+A.

Despite going off-air, RCR hosts continued to publish videos and podcasts on the station's social media channels including conversations between hosts and podcast versions of their shows. On 17 April 2024, Reality Check Radio released a plan to shift towards a donor-funded model and set a goal of increasing its subscription base from 3,500 to 10,000 paying members. RCR also announced new features including talkback functionality, documentaries and a press gallery presence. On 28 April, Reality Check Radio announced that it still needed NZ$480,000 to return to the airwaves. The station claimed that it had received thousands of messages of support, with some cancelling their Netflix, Sky, and Spotify subscriptions to support RCR. The station restarted a few weeks later having reached their fundraising total of almost $500,000.

In early June 2024, the Advertising Standards Authority ruled that a Reality Check Radio–sponsored advertisement in March 2024 unsubstantiated claims about COVID-19 vaccines, which breached the standards of the advertising code. The Authority ordered that the offending advertisement not to published again in its present form. In response, RCR co-founder Claire Deeks defended the accuracy of the advertisement and accused the Authority of acting like a "kangaroo court." Jonson ceased her shareholding in the company in 2025, leaving Deeks and Bland as co-owners.
