= Simon Thornley =

New Zealand medical doctor

- Born: Simon James Thornley
- Education: University of Auckland
- Scientific career
- Fields: Epidemiology, Biostatistics
- Workplaces: University of Auckland
- Thesis: Studies of cardiovascular disease risk estimation : how, and whether, to account for the effect of drug treatment? (2014)
- Doctoral advisor: Roger Marshall; Rod Jackson

Simon James Thornley is a New Zealand medical doctor and academic specialising in epidemiology and biostatistics, and as of 2021 is a senior lecturer at the University of Auckland.

== Career ==
Thornley trained as a medical doctor prior to joining the University of Auckland as a public health academic specialising in epidemiology and biostatistics. He graduated from the University of Auckland with a Bachelor of Human Biology in 1997, a Bachelor of Medicine and Bachelor of Surgery in May 2000, and Master of Public Health with First Class Honours in 2006 and a Doctor of Philosophy in Medicine in 2015. His 2014 doctoral thesis was Studies of cardiovascular disease risk estimation: how, and whether, to account for the effect of drug treatment?

Thornley is a part of 'FIZZ', a group of New Zealand health researchers aiming to eliminate sugary drinks from New Zealand by 2025. He has researched the links between scabies and other health issues in relation to health inequities.

=== Covid Plan B group ===
Thornley is a member of the Covid Plan B group, which has repeatedly criticised the New Zealand government's management of the COVID pandemic, and "Thornley [has] become the most notable critic of the Government’s Covid-19 elimination strategy". Thornley said that elimination of COVID-19 was "unrealistic and over-ambitions" but epidemiologist Rod Jackson claimed that Thornley [was] "the only dissenter in the epidemiological community." Early in the pandemic, Thornley was quoted as saying "Hanging out for a vaccine is not an option... a fantasy, in my view." The Covid Plan B group was widely criticised, but they responded by saying that their freedom of expression was being shut down and that there was 'censorship of alternate views.'

In March 2021, the anti-misinformation group Fight Against Conspiracy Theories issued an open letter to the Covid Plan B group including Thornley criticising their partnership with the anti-vaccination group Voices for Freedom (VFF). Thornley served as a keynote speaker at a VFF event in March 2021 and appeared on the group's webshow. Covid Plan B's Facebook page also shared social media posts by Voices for Freedom.

Siouxsie Wiles, a fellow University of Auckland academic, wrote that "Simon Thornley of the Plan B group, about whom I’ve written before, has given evidence in support of the group trying to halt the roll-out [of the COVID vaccine]" in an article on COVID-related misinformation. Thornley responded through a lawyer claiming the article was a "defamatory publication" and demanding his name be removed and a correction.

A 2021 paper which Thornley co-authored which linked mRNA vaccines, such as the Pfizer COVID-19 vaccine, to significantly higher rates of miscarriage was publicly criticised by the academic community throughout New Zealand, including the Head and other senior members of the university's School of Population Health, for ignoring evidence that had already been published in a high-impact peer-reviewed research journal, and for a less-than-rigorous analysis of the data provided by the Center for Disease Control in the USA. The paper, which was published in a small journal edited by an American anti-vaccination advocate, was retracted in November 2021, with Thornley saying that he and his co-author had made a major mathematical error.

Also in November 2021, Thornley participated in a livestream with former Northland Member of Parliament Matt King, where they discussed alternative (and widely debunked) treatments for COVID-19, as well as downplaying the severity of the disease. Judith Collins, leader of the New Zealand National Party, distanced the party from these comments, saying that the party believed in the effectiveness of vaccines.

Thornley received the 2021 Bent Spoon Award from the NZ Skeptics society, for showing "the most egregious gullibility or lack of critical thinking in public coverage of, or commentary on, a science-related issue".

== Selected works ==
- Thornley, Simon, Chris Bullen, and Mick Roberts. "Hepatitis B in a high prevalence New Zealand population: a mathematical model applied to infection control policy." Journal of Theoretical Biology 254, no. 3 (2008): 599–603.
- Thornley, S. J., A. Woodward, John D. Langley, Shanthi N. Ameratunga, and Anthony Rodgers. "Conspicuity and bicycle crashes: preliminary findings of the Taupo Bicycle Study." Injury prevention 14, no. 1 (2008): 11–18.
- Bullen, Christopher, Hayden McRobbie, Simon Thornley, Marewa Glover, Ruey Lin, and M. Laugesen. "Effect of an electronic nicotine delivery device (e cigarette) on desire to smoke and withdrawal, user preferences and nicotine delivery: randomised cross-over trial." Tobacco control 19, no. 2 (2010): 98–103.
- Winnard, Doone, Craig Wright, William J. Taylor, Gary Jackson, Leanne Te Karu, Peter J. Gow, Bruce Arroll, Simon Thornley, Barry Gribben, and Nicola Dalbeth. "National prevalence of gout derived from administrative health data in Aotearoa New Zealand." Rheumatology 51, no. 5 (2012): 901–909.
- Lawes, Carlene MM, Simon Thornley, Robert Young, Raewyn Hopkins, Roger Marshall, Wing Cheuk Chan, and Gary Jackson. "Statin use in COPD patients is associated with a reduction in mortality: a national cohort study." Primary Care Respiratory Journal 21, no. 1 (2012): 35–40.
