= Chantelle Baker =

New Zealand social media influencer and anti-vaccination activist

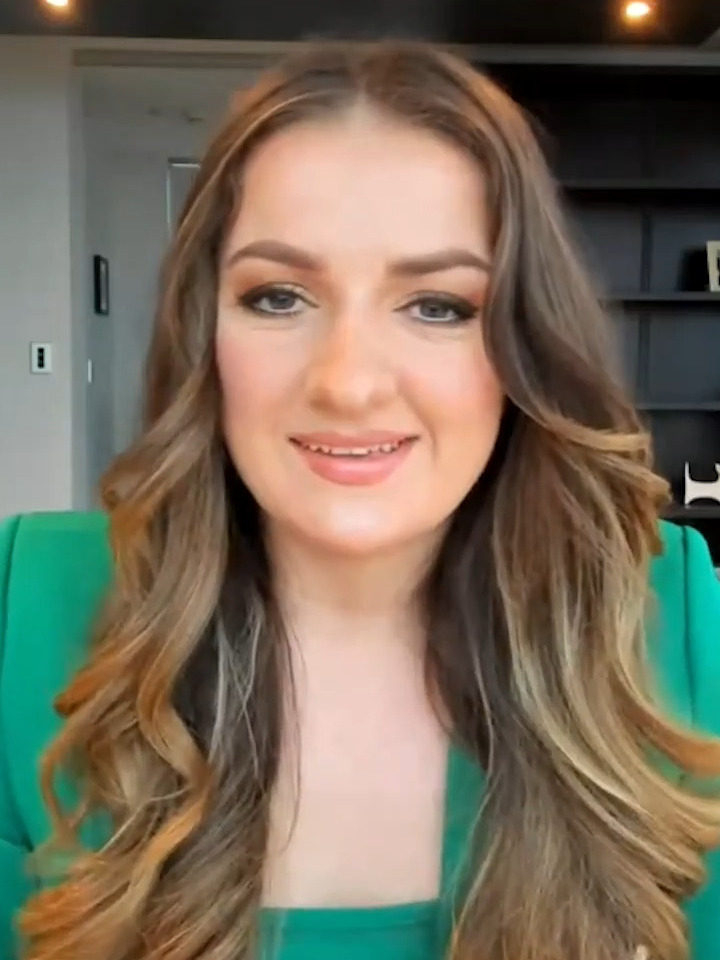
- Baker in 2022
- Occupation: Social media influencer
- Known for: Political activism
- Father: Leighton Baker

Chantelle Baker is a right-wing New Zealand social media influencer and conservative activist who is the daughter of former New Conservative Party leader Leighton Baker. In 2022, she attracted domestic media attention for her involvement in the 2022 Wellington protest and for her promotion of anti-COVID vaccine misinformation and conspiracy theories.

== Family ==
Chantelle Baker is the daughter of Leighton Baker, who served as the leader of the New Conservative Party between 2015 and 2020. According to The Spinoff, Baker was a self-described fashionista and reality TV competitor who posted mainly fashion and beauty-related videos prior to the 2022 Wellington protest.

== Controversial views ==
=== Opposition to COVID-19 vaccine mandates ===
By February 2022, Chantelle claimed 100,000 followers on social media. Between February and March 2022, Chantelle and her father Leighton took part in the 2022 Wellington protest against the covid vaccine and mandates. During the protest, Chantelle used Facebook and Instagram to distribute livestream footage of the protest, interviews promoting vaccine conspiracies including that COVID-19 vaccines could make a person "magnetic," and updates about court proceedings against protesters who were arrested. Though she and her father claimed not to speak on behalf of the protesters, they met with the Police to discuss the protest and the resulting vehicle blockage in the Wellington CBD. The Spinoff's editor Toby Manhire described her as the "Instagram-ready face of the protest" due to her prolific social media promotion of the protest.

After the Police dispersed the protesters from the New Zealand Parliament's grounds on 3 March 2022, Chantelle claimed that fires started by protesters were started by police and agent provocateurs. Following the Wellington parliament protest, Baker continued sharing information on social media that conflicted with public health advice and expressed support for the Russian invasion of Ukraine.

In mid-August 2022, Meta Platforms disabled Baker's Facebook page for violating their policy of sharing misinformation that could lead to harm. Meta did not suspend Baker's Instagram profile, which she continued to use to communicate with her followers. Baker has claimed that both the Stuff media company and New Zealand Government conspired to deplatform her Facebook account.

=== Operation People ===
By late August 2022, Baker had established a media company called Operation People. Waimakariri District Council candidate and conspiracy theorist Phil Shaw owned a 32% share in Operation People through his film and video production company Scryptworx Studios Limited.

In mid-October 2022, The Spinoff reported that Baker had established a new Facebook page that was part of a "new independent media group." That same month, The Spinoff reported that she had met and interviewed the Dutch far right politician Thierry Baudet and attended the Vienna leg of the Better Way Conference, an international gathering of conspiracy theorists. Baker also visited Ukraine including Odesa and Kyiv to cover the Russian invasion of Ukraine for the media group she was working for.

In December 2022, Baker and her media company Operation People co-produced a documentary with film studio Heanna Gain called We Came Here For Freedom Part I. The documentary looked at the events of 2022 Wellington protest from the perspective of the protesters and was written and directed by Alistair Harding. The second part was released in July and August 2023.

=== Reality Check Radio ===
In March 2023, Baker became a host on anti-vaccination group Voices for Freedom's online radio station Reality Check Radio (RCR).

=== Litigation ===
In 2024, Canadian-New Zealander billionaire Jim Grenon's online publication the Centrist supported Baker's defamation lawsuit against The New Zealand Herald and The Disinformation Project researcher Kate Hannah. The Herald had published an article by David Fisher on 9 April 2023 which Baker considered defamatory and untrue. On 30 September 2024, The Herald settled with Baker out of court for an undisclosed sum.

With the support of Centrist, Baker has also pursued legal action against media company Stuff for alleged defamation in its 2022 documentary Fire and Fury. On 21 May 2025, Stuff applied for security costs in Baker's defamation suit at the Wellington High Court in order to ensure that the plaintiff is able to pay costs to the defendant if their legal action is unsuccessful. On 12 June 2025, Associate Judge Peter Skelton ordered Baker to pay a total bond of NZ$100,000 leading up to her defamation case against Stuff.

== Personal life ==
Baker has a child. In July 2024, Baker was allegedly intimidated by two women during a road rage incident in Rangiora, who damaged her car windscreen and attempted to force their way into her car. Baker shared footage of the incident on social media. Police confirmed they had received reports and were investigating the incident.

As of June 2025, Baker was reportedly living in Australia's Gold Coast region.
