= Peter Williams (broadcaster) =

New Zealand broadcaster and sports writer

- Born: 6 March 1954 (age 72); Geraldine, New Zealand
- Occupation: Broadcaster
- Years active: 1972–present
- Employer(s): TVNZ (1979–2018); MediaWorks (2019–2021); Reality Check Radio (2023–present)
- Television: 1News

Peter Allan Williams (born 6 March 1954) is a New Zealand broadcaster and sports journalist who worked for the national broadcaster TVNZ between 1979 and 2018. His roles with TVNZ included hosting the 1News 6pm weekend bulletin and serving as the southern editor of TVNZ Sports in Wellington. Between 2019 and 2021, Williams also hosted the morning talkback programme on Magic Talk, a MediaWorks radio network.

Since March 2023, he has been a host on Reality Check Radio, an internet radio station run by anti-vaccine group Voices for Freedom.

== Early life and family ==
Williams was born in Geraldine in 1954, the son of Elizabeth Ann (née McLaren) and Allan Huia Williams. He was educated at Waitaki Boys' High School from 1967 to 1971, and then West High School in Corning, New York as an AFS scholar from 1971 to 1972. Williams played in the Otago schoolboys golf team in 1970 and was a North Otago cricket representative in 1971.

Williams married Cecile van Dyk in 1976; they have three children.

== Broadcasting ==
=== TVNZ, 1979–2018 ===
Williams started his broadcasting career at Radio Otago's 4XO, now More FM, in Dunedin in 1972. During the 1970s, Williams later worked as a sports broadcaster at the Christchurch–based television channel TV2. On 21st July 1979, Williams joined the national broadcaster TVNZ, serving as a sports anchorman, commentator and reporter before joining the 1 News team full-time in his main role as Breakfast newsreader in 2002.

Williams has covered seven Olympic Games, including the 2008 Beijing Olympics, from which he garnered the TP McLean Award for Sports Television. He has also covered five Commonwealth Games, three Rugby World Cups, two Cricket World Cups and two Masters golf tournaments. In addition, Williams fronted 1 News' coverage of the Pike River Mine disaster.

In 1999, Williams was awarded the New Zealand Rugby Union's Supreme Media Award for his work at the 1999 Rugby World Cup. He has twice been New Zealand Golf Broadcaster of the Year.

Between 2003 and 2016, Williams presented the news bulletins on Television New Zealand's Breakfast and Good Morning shows, followed by the half-hour 1 News at Midday; from 2008 he combined this duty with that of presenting weekend editions of 1 News at Six.

In 2010 and 2011, TV Guide readers voted him New Zealand's best news presenter.

Williams retired from TVNZ with his last broadcast on the Sunday evening news on 16 December 2018.

=== Magic Talk, 2019–2021 ===
In January 2019, Williams became a talk show host at the Tauranga-based Magic Talk radio station, hosting the current affairs programme "Magic Mornings."

On 12 February 2021, Williams drew controversy when he directed listeners to an anti-vaccine site run by the "Voices for Freedom" group which was spreading COVID-19 misinformation.

In mid February 2021, Williams questioned the Deputy Prime Minister and Finance Minister Grant Robertson about his views on the possible implications of the World Economic Forum's Great Reset for New Zealand, and the related Great Reset Conspiracy Theory. In response, Robertson ended his weekly Magic Talk interviews, stating that he did not want to "shoot down conspiracy theories."

In early September 2021, Williams announced that he would be retiring from Magic Talk at the end of the month, stating that he wanted to "enjoy a life with fewer commitments" following a lengthy broadcasting career. Media Works confirmed that he would be succeeded by broadcasters Leah Panapa and Danny Watson, who would host the morning and afternoon programmes respectively.

=== Reality Check Radio, 2023–2025 ===
In March 2023, The Spinoff reported that Williams had become a host on Voices for Freedom's online radio station Reality Check Radio.

== Other pursuits ==
Williams was a sports writer and columnist from the beginning of the Herald on Sunday in 2004 until the end of 2009. He wrote predominantly about golf, a sport with which he had a close involvement during the first decade of the new century. That included a period as a selector of Auckland representative teams in 2008 and as a director of New Zealand Golf Inc during 2008 and 2009.

In 2010, he concentrated his sporting activity on triathlon and completed the Port of Tauranga Half (2 km swim, 90 km bike and 21.1 km run) on 8 January 2011. His time was 6 hours and 37 minutes. The effort raised over $8000 for Look Good Feel Better, an organisation which helps women suffering from cancer with make-up and hair assistance.

Williams joined the board of the New Zealand Taxpayers' Union in April 2022, and in June spoke on behalf of them at a Groundswell NZ rally against the Three Waters reform programme. He has also opposed vaccinations.

== Personal life ==
Williams' first wife Cecile died of ovarian cancer in November 1996. During the time of her illness she received assistance from Look Good Feel Better.

Williams lives with his third wife Sara at Bendigo, New Zealand.

== See also ==
- List of New Zealand television personalities
