= Nature Reviews Rheumatology =

- Discipline: Rheumatology
- Language: English
- Edited by: Sarah Onuora

Publication details
- Former name(s): Nature Clinical Practice Rheumatology
- History: 2005–present
- Publisher: Nature Portfolio
- Frequency: Monthly
- Impact factor: 32.286 (2021)

Standard abbreviations
- ISO 4: Nat. Rev. Rheumatol.

Indexing
- CODEN: NRRACB
- ISSN: 1759-4790 (print); 1759-4804 (web)

Links
- Journal homepage; Online archive

Nature Reviews Rheumatology is a monthly peer-reviewed medical journal published by the Nature Portfolio. It was established in 2005 as Nature Clinical Practice Rheumatology and obtained its current title in 2009. The journal covers all aspects of rheumatology. The editor-in-chief is Sarah Onuora.

According to the Journal Citation Reports, the journal has a 2021 impact factor of 32.286, ranking it 2nd out of 34 journals in the category "Rheumatology".
