= Voices for Freedom =

Anti-vaccination group in New Zealand

TJB 2021 Limited
- Trade name: Voices For Freedom (VFF)
- Type: NZ Limited Company
- Industry: Other Interest Group Services n.e.c.
- Founded: 2021 (5 years ago)
- Area served: New Zealand
- Owner: Alia Bland (33.33%); Claire Deeks (33.33%); Elizabeth Jonson (33.33%)
- Website: voicesforfreedom.co.nz
- Footnotes; S955960 – Other Interest Group Services n.e.c. on Australian and New Zealand Standard Industrial Classification (ANZSIC)

TJB 2021 Limited, trading as Voices for Freedom (VFF), is an advocacy group in New Zealand that formed in December 2020 to oppose the New Zealand Government's COVID-19 mitigation policies and vaccination rollout. The organisation is founded and led by food blogger and former Advance New Zealand candidate Claire Deeks, Libby Jonson and Alia Bland. Voices for Freedom has been criticised by NZ Skeptics, The Spinoff editor Madeleine Chapman, and FACT Aotearoa for spreading misinformation about COVID-19 and vaccinations.

== Leadership and structure ==
Voices for Freedom was founded in December 2020 by food blogger and former Advance New Zealand candidate Claire Deeks, Libby Jonson and Alia Bland as "a non-political organisation focused on protecting New Zealanders' fundamental human rights with a particular focus on freedom of speech, health/medical freedom and all freedoms under attack from an overzealous and oppressive Covid-19 response."

Voices for Freedom registered as a limited liability company, under the legal name TJB 2021 Limited, on 27 April 2021.

As of 15 August 2022, VFF claimed to have 100,000 members.

The organisation's financial sources remain opaque, having spent large amounts on promotion and court cases, but claims to have received donations from "thousands of concerned Kiwis".

== Communications output ==
=== Flyers ===
In March 2021, Voices for Freedom teamed up with the Advance NZ party to distribute a magazine called The Real News promoting conspiracy theories about the COVID-19 pandemic and vaccines, using discredited internet-based sources. The Real News is published by Full Court Press director and shareholder Jonathan Eisen and his wife Katherine Smith, whose company also publishes the pseudoscientific The New Zealand Journal of Natural Medicine and the conspiracy theory–promoting Uncensored magazine. By 12 March, at least 60,000 copies of the magazine had been distributed to postboxes. By May 2021, the VFF and Advance NZ had raised NZ$10,000 to print and distribute 60,000 copies of The Real News. The following month, a second issue of The Real News was circulated. The Full Court Press Limited was incorporated in 2004.

In late April 2021, Voices for Freedom distributed a 29-page 'COVID Response Survival Kit' questioning the safety of COVID-19 vaccines and minimising the danger posed by SARS-CoV-2. In response, University of Waikato biological scientist Alison Campbell and the University of Auckland Helen Petousis-Harris criticised the pamphlet for spreading disinformation and propaganda that did not meet the standard of scrutiny.

In mid-May 2021, Deeks claimed that the VFF had raised NZ$50,000 towards printing two million virus "fact flyers" which it intended to distribute nationwide. In response, University of Otago clinical microbiologist and immunologist James Ussher criticised the flyers for spreading disinformation about the Pfizer–BioNTech COVID-19 vaccine. Meanwhile, lawyer Mark von Dadelszen cautioned against donating to Voices for Freedom since it was neither a registered charity nor an incorporated society with a formal structure.

In mid-August 2025, Voices for Freedom began selling a book called The People's Position, which it purported to "shatter the official COVID-19 narrative", on social media. The book alleged that foreign DNA found in Pfizer and Moderna vaccine vials caused cancer and "genomic instability," that the booster vaccine rollout cause deaths and questioned the scientific evidence for cloth face masks. By 13 August, it had sold over 4,000 copies.

=== Advertising ===
In late July 2021, Voices for Freedom was banned from the social media platform Facebook for spreading misinformation related to the COVID-19 pandemic. Prior to the ban, VFF's Facebook page had attracted 12,000 followers. In response, co-founder Bland claimed that Facebook had silenced them since they were reaching half a million people each month and alleged that the Government and mainstream media were spreading misinformation about COVID-19.

In early August 2021, the VFF posted a series of advertisements on LUMO Digital Outdoor's four digital billboards in Auckland calling for submissions on the Government's hate speech legislation. Two of these digital billboards were situated outside the public broadcaster Radio New Zealand's Auckland office. Due to the group's controversial views and disinformation about COVID-19, Voice for Freedom's advertisements were removed.

On 28 April 2022, the Advertising Standards Authority (ASA) ruled that three Voices for Freedom billboards opposing face masks and vaccination had breached advertising regulations on social responsibility, truthful presentation and advocacy advertising. However, the ASA did not uphold a complaint against a fourth billboard published in February 2022 highlighting a Dunedin man who had died from an adverse vaccine reaction in late 2021.

On 27 May 2022, the ASA ordered the removal of another VFF advertisement questioning the Government's vaccination effort on the grounds that it breached advertising guidelines on social responsibility and truthful representation. This marked the third time that the advertising watchdog had ruled against the organisation's advertisements.

=== Online output ===
By mid-August 2022, Voices for Freedom had developed a website, email newsletters, a Telegram channel, and a video channel called "Freedom TV" on a far right streaming platform. These were used to facilitate communication, local activism and disseminate anti-vaccination disinformation.

=== Reality Check Radio ===
In March 2023, VFF launched an online radio station called Reality Check Radio (RCR). The group's three core leaders Deeks, Bland and Libby Jonson each have a 33.33% stake in the company, which was registered as NZ Media Ventures Limited. Notable hosts include former ACT Party leader Rodney Hide, former TVNZ broadcaster Peter Williams, anti-vaccine influencer Chantelle Baker, former Radio New Zealand broadcaster Paul Brennan, VFF activist and local councillor Jaspreet Bosparai, former Federated Farmers president Don Nicholson and former Green Party candidate Natalie Cutler-Welsh, The station has promoted anti-woke, anti-transgender content, COVID-19 vaccine hesitancy, and climate change denial. In April 2024, the station went off air due to financial problems, leading to a fundraising campaign led by host Williams.

== Activism ==
=== Networking ===
In February 2021, Peter Williams had encouraged listeners on his Magic Talk radio station to visit Voices for Freedom's website, agreeing with their opposition to the Pfizer-BioNTech COVID-19 vaccine and support for ivermectin as a treatment for COVID-19. Williams subsequently joined VFF's Reality Check Radio in March 2023.

By March 2021, Voices for Freedom had established a partnership with 'Covid Plan B', a group of anti-lockdown health professionals and academics led by University of Auckland epidemiologist Simon Thornley. In March 2020, Thornley had criticised the New Zealand Government's COVID-19 alert level system, which utilised lockdowns. Thornley also served as a keynote speaker at a VFF event in March 2021 and appeared on the group's webshow. Covid Plan B's Facebook page also shared social media posts by Voices for Freedom. COVID-19 Plan B's partnership with VFF was criticised in an open letter by the anti-misinformation group Fight Against Conspiracy Theories (FACT).

On 20 October 2022, Voices for Freedom supporters participated in the farming advocacy group Groundswell NZ's nationwide protests against the Government's plans to farm carbon emissions from 2025. VFF protesters attended several Groundswell protest events in Auckland, Dunedin, Wellington, Christchurch, and Timaru. According to Stuff journalist Charlie Mitchell, VFF and Groundswell leaders had allowed VFF members to attend Groundswell protests in order to boost the latter's numbers. Mitchell attributed Voices for Freedom's support for Groundswell's protests to an "identity crisis" caused by the Government's lessening of COVID-19 pandemic restrictions, which prompted the VFF to look for new causes in response to declining public engagement with their content.

=== Protests ===
Voices for Freedom staged several protests across New Zealand in 2021 and 2022. On 6 November 2021, 20–30 supporters led by Dunedin coordinator Tracey Pita staged a protest in Dunedin's Cumberland street near the University of Otago's Dunedin campus. They opposed the Government's vaccine mandates for health, education, and corrections workers.

On 9 November 2021, VFF organised an anti-vaccine mandate march in Invercargill, which attracted between 150 and 300 participants. Protesters marched from the Invercargill War Memorial to Labour List MP Liz Craig's electorate office.

On 10 December 2021, several Voices for Freedom protesters participated in a protest march in Auckland alongside those holding flags of the United Tribes of New Zealand and those opposing the Chinese Communist Party. After gathering in the Auckland Domain for speeches, participants marched to Government House, the Auckland residence of the Governor-General of New Zealand.

On 8 January 2022, the VFF organised an anti-vaccination and anti-lockdown rally in Whanganui. National Party Member of Parliament Harete Hipango attended the protest and posted a social media photo of herself at the rally alongside a second post criticising the label 'anti-vaxer' and 'misinformer'. Following a discussion with National Party leader Christopher Luxon, Hipango deleted the post, and Luxon issued a statement that the group's views did not align with the National Party's position on COVID-19 issues.

Voices for Freedom participated in the 2022 Wellington protests. On 16 February 2022, Stuff journalist Glenn McConnell reported that the group's merchandise was frequently seen at the protest camp outside the New Zealand Parliament.

On 23 February, several VFF protesters heckled Prime Minister Jacinda Ardern during her visit to Westport.

=== Vaccine certificates ===
On 3 November 2021, Voices for Freedom advertised an event at Newbury School in Palmerston North for people seeking vaccine exemptions. The school, possibly with the support of the Ministry of Education, then withdrew permission for VFF to use its facilities, prompting the cancellation of the event. Social media posts promoting the event claimed that "registered practitioners" were selling vaccine certificates for $10 for individuals and $20 for families. A similar vaccine exemption signing event had been held at a Seventh-day Adventist Church in Palmerston North on 1 November. In response, COVID-19 Response Minister Chris Hipkins announced that the Government would be establishing a centralised system to approve vaccine exemptions and clarified that selling or giving away vaccination certificates was illegal.

=== Alleged front organisations ===
According to The Spinoff journalist Madeleine Chapman and FACT Aotearoa, Voices for Freedom's Wairarapa Local Coordinator Deborah Cunliffe had established a front organisation called "Nurses for Freedom NZ" (NZFF). While Cunliffe claimed that the two groups are not related, she acknowledged that the VFF supported the NZFF's work. The group spread misinformation, disinformation, and conspiracy theories about the New World Order on its Telegram channel. Despite claiming to represent 700 nurses and healthcare assistants, Paparoa (which researches the far right in New Zealand) found that the group only had ten registered nurses on its membership list. On 28 June 2022, NZFF staged protests outside hospitals in 12 major centres including the Hawke's Bay region calling for the Government to lifts its vaccine mandate requirement for nurses.

On 18 August 2022, Stuff journalist Andrea Vance reported that a Northland-based electoral ticket body called "Sovereign" was running for the Far North District Council. While the group denied being connected with Voices for Freedom, it shared several characteristics including spreading disinformation about COVID-19 and opposing COVID-19 vaccines. In addition, the group has opposed the Government's climate change policies, co-governance arrangements, the Three Waters reform programme, and water fluoridation. The eight-member Sovereign group was founded by Joshua Riley and was reportedly inspired by the American sovereign citizen movement.

Another alleged front organisation is the Auckland–based UnifyNZ, whose stated mission is to raise "regional awareness on critical and highly topical issues." The group is led by the VFF's former Warkworth co-ordinator Teresa Gibson, who has denied that the two groups are formally connected but acknowledged there were individuals with overlapping memberships in both organisations. On 30 July 2022, UnifyNZ organised a public meeting opposing co-governance, which was attended by Rodney ward councillor Greg Sawyers, Albany ward councillor John Watson, Hobson's Pledge trustee Casey Costello, and Groundswell NZ leader Scott Bright. In August 2022, New Zealand First leader Winston Peters spoke at another UnifyNZ meeting opposing co-governance. UnifyNZ has also organised public meetings in September 2022 titled "How the World Health Organisation, World Economic Forum, and (investment managers) BlackRock and Vanguard are internationally connected" and "How UN Agenda 2030 and the 'Green Energy Policies' on food, transport, farming, and heating are impacting Kiwis."

=== Electoral campaigning and entryism ===
In mid–August 2022, Stuff and the Guardian Australia reported that Voices for Freedom had called upon its members to stand candidates in the 2022 New Zealand local elections with the intention of infiltrating local government bodies in order to make New Zealand "ungovernable" at the local government level. VFF candidates were instructed to conceal their affiliation with the group when running as candidates. Victoria University of Wellington political scientist Dr Mona Krewel expressed concern that VFF candidates had a good chance of being elected if voter turnout was low and due to the low number of candidates running for local government positions. Similarly, University of Otago researcher and The Disinformation Project research lead Dr Sanjana Hattotuwa expressed concern about VFF-affiliated candidates concealing their true agenda and seeking to make New Zealand "ungovernable."

Notable VFF candidates included Gill Booth and Southland dairy farmer Jaspreet Boparai, who claimed that local councils were following orders from the United Nations' Agenda 2030. Booth ran for the Teviot Valley Community Board while Boparai ran for the Southland District Council and Tuatapere Te Waewae Community Board. The Otago Daily Times also reported that the VFF's Dunedin coordinators Watson and Tracey Pita were running for the Otago Regional Council, Dunedin City Council, and Saddle Hill Community Board respectively. In addition, other VFF candidates have run for various Dunedin city council, mayoral, and community board positions.

On 16 August, Stuff reported that five VFF-affiliated candidates were running for the Christchurch City Council including Sally Cogle, Colleen Farrelly, Mike Wilson, Rob Gray, and Don Cross. Cogle has described COVID-19 as a version of the flu and claimed that COVID-19 vaccines were "poison." Cogle claimed that she and her fellow candidates were standing as independents. Former police officer Wilson has questioned mask and vaccine mandates.

In 18 August, The New Zealand Herald reported that Voices for Freedom was encouraging its followers to apply for key roles and positions with the Electoral Commission for the 2023 New Zealand general election including election managers. Co-founder Deeks claimed that many New Zealanders were concerned about a "general decline" in democracy. In response, Justice Minister Kiri Allan expressed concerns about political forces wanting to intervene in New Zealand elections and stated that electoral staff should operate without bias. Chief electoral officer Karl Le Quesne added that the Electoral Commission had mechanisms including written submissions, job interviews, and referee checks to ensure that only qualified workers were hired.

On 22 August, the Taranaki Daily News reported that VFF's head of national operations Tane Webster was running for a seat in the New Plymouth District Council (NPDC). Other NPDC candidates including Murray Chong, sitting councillor Anneka Carlson, Monica Hylton, and Caro McKee have taken part in anti-vaccination and anti-lockdown protests but claimed they were not affiliated with Voices for Freedom.

On 26 August, Hamilton mayoral candidate and NZ Outdoors & Freedom Party co-leader Donna Pokere-Phillips denied that she was linked to Voices for Freedom. Pokere-Phillips had previously shared anti-COVID vaccination content on social media and appeared on the anti-vaccination platform Counterspin Media. In addition, Pokere-Phillips has opposed the Government's Three Waters reform programme.

On 27 August, Stuff reported that the Nelson City Council candidate Zoe Byrne had links to Voices for Freedom. Byrne had delivered newsletters for the group and spoke at their Resilience Festival in Richmond's A&P Showgrounds on 20 August. Byrne is also affiliated with a local election ticket body called the Nelson Citizens' Alliance, which has opposed the Government's Three Waters reform programme and the establishment of a Māori ward on the Nelson City Council. In June 2022, VFF had endorsed the Nelson Citizens' Alliance in a newsletter. In response, Nelson Citizens' Alliance spokesperson Peter Rait stated that he was unaware of Byrne's affiliation with VFF.

On 28 August, Stuff reported that several Groundswell NZ activists including Whangārei convenor Tracy Thomasson and James Wolfen Duvall were also members of Voices for Freedom. Thomasson ran as a candidate for the Whangārei District Council and had also shared social media posts expressing anti-vaccination sentiment, promoting the far right group Counterspin Media, and supporting the anti-vaccine protesters' occupation of Parliament. Duvall also ran for the Golden Bay ward of the Tasman District Council. In response, Groundswell's co-founder Bryan McKenzie stated that these individuals did not represent Groundswell's values and added that Groundswell had severed ties with Thomasson.

In mid-September 2022, Stuff reported that Voices for Freedom had enlisted former Green Party candidate and public relations practitioner Natalie Cutler-Welsh to coach their candidates about election campaigning, handling social media, messaging and handling journalists. In addition, co-found Deeks confirmed that she had recruited Canadian-New Zealander Cutler-Welsh to run online seminars on communications and managing online and social media behaviour.

On 21 September, Taupō District Council candidate Duncan Campbell acknowledged that he supported Voices for Freedom's positions and had attended their meetings.

In early October 2022, Voices for Freedom published a candidate survey listing candidates who shared its views on opposing lockdowns, vaccine mandates and the Three Waters reform programme. The group also launched an advertising campaign to counter the New Plymouth District Council's anti-disinformation advertising campaign.

Following the release of preliminary local election results on 8 October, Stuff reported that fewer than twelve Voices of Freedom–affiliated candidates had been elected to local government positions. The VFF had fielded over 200 candidates who were contesting 159 races. Notable successful pro-VFF candidates have included Southland District Council member Jaspreet Bosparai, Teviot Community Board member Gill Booth, Deputy Mayor of Whanganui Jenny Duncan, Paraparaumu/Raumati Community board member Jonny Best, Waikato Regional Council member Clyde Graf, Selwyn District Council member Elizabeth Mundt, Hibiscus and Bays Local Board member Leanne Willis, Oraka Aparima community board member Emma Gould, and Taupo District Council member Duncan Campbell. In addition, several incumbent councillors who had expressed support for VFF's views including Carterton District Council member Jill Greathead and Gisborne District Council member Meredith Akuhata-Brown were defeated.
