= Rheumatology (journal) =

- Discipline: Rheumatology
- Language: English
- Edited by: Ernest Choy

Publication details
- Former name(s): British Journal of Rheumatology, Rheumatology and Rehabilitation, Rheumatology and Physical Medicine, Annals of Physical Medicine
- History: 1952–present
- Publisher: Oxford University Press
- Frequency: Monthly
- Open access: Hybrid
- Impact factor: 7.580 (2020)

Standard abbreviations
- ISO 4: Rheumatology (Oxford)

Indexing
- CODEN: RUMAFK
- ISSN: 1462-0324 (print); 1462-0332 (web)
- OCLC no.: 40922029

Links
- Journal homepage; British Society for Rheumatology; Online archive

Rheumatology is a monthly peer-reviewed medical journal published by Oxford University Press. It is one of two official journals of the British Society for Rheumatology, the other being Rheumatology Advances in Practice. The journal covers all aspects of paediatric and adult rheumatological conditions. The editor-in-chief is Prof. Ernest Choy (University of Cardiff).

== Article types ==
The journal publishes the following article types:

- Original articles
- Reviews
- Editorials
- Guidelines
- Concise reports
- Meta-analyses
- Original case reports
- Clinical vignettes
- Letters
- Matters arising from published material

== Editors-in-chief ==
The following persons have been editors-in-chief:

- Marwan Bukhari (2019-2024)
- Jaap van Laar (2014-2018)
- Robert J. Moots (2009-2013)
- Richard Watts (2003-2008)
- David Scott (1997-2002)
- H. A. Bird (1991-1997)
- Terry Gibson (1986-1991)
- Rodney Grahame (1982-1986)
- Douglas Woolf (1968-1982)
- P. Hume Kendall (1963-1968)
- A. C. Boyle (1956-1963)
- Hugh Burt (1952-1956)

== Abstracting and indexing ==
The journal is abstracted and indexed in Biological Abstracts, BIOSIS Previews, Current Contents/Clinical Medicine, EMBASE/Excerpta Medica, ProQuest, MEDLINE/PubMed, and Science Citation Index. According to the Journal Citation Reports, its 2020 impact factor is 7.580, ranking it 5th out of 32 journals in the category "Rheumatology".
