= Royal New Zealand College of Urgent Care =

Medical college in Auckland, New Zealand

- Abbreviation: RNZCUC
- Formation: 1992 (as Accident and Medical Practitioners Association)
- Type: Medical college / Professional body
- Headquarters: Auckland, New Zealand
- Region served: New Zealand
- Members: Urgent care doctors, Fellows (FRNZCUC), and registrars (MRNZCUC)
- Chairperson: Dr Kelvin Ward
- CEO: Adrian Metcalfe
- Website: rnzcuc.org.nz

The Royal New Zealand College of Urgent Care (RNZCUC) is the professional medical college responsible for training doctors and setting educational standards for urgent care medicine in New Zealand. Operating under the Medical Council of New Zealand, the college oversees fellowship programs and standards for urgent care clinics throughout the country.

== History ==
Specialised medical training and professional oversight in Australia and New Zealand were historically heavily influenced by traditional British royal medical colleges such as the Royal College of Physicians and the Royal College of Surgeons. However, as local healthcare systems and geographical realities evolved, it became apparent that these distant bodies were no longer sufficient and there was a need for local bodies that could tailor medical training to the unique demands of the local population and environment.

The establishment of the Royal Australasian College of Surgeons (RACS) in 1927 (which includes New Zealand) showed that medical training could be managed locally and did not need to defer to British Institutions.

In the UK, Emergency Medicine ("Casualty"), was recognized as its own discipline with the founding of the Casualty Surgeons Association in 1967, which became the British Association for Accident and Emergency Medicine in 1990. In New Zealand a similar approach was adopted when the Accident and Medical Practitioners Association was formed in 1992. Following the British model, this organisation was established to represent doctors working in emergency care who recognised that their specific skills required dedicated professional recognition and specialized training. Soon there were around 20 Urgent Care Centres in Auckland and other towns also were starting to adopt the model.

Once the Urgent Care discipline was recognized by the Medical Council of New Zealand, the organization sought official recognition. In October 2013, the organization was granted its "Royal" prefix, officially becoming the Royal New Zealand College of Urgent Care. Urgent Care in New Zealand then became the fourth frontline specialty recognized by the MCNZ, joining General Practice, Emergency Medicine, and Rural Hospital Medicine. Urgent care clinics exist as a viable community-based alternative to the hospital ED (emergency department) in certain situations, and the RNZCUC is set up to govern these doctors and their facilities.

== Training and Fellowship ==
The college is designated by the Medical Council of New Zealand (MCNZ) to administer vocational training and set professional standards for urgent care medicine. This consists of an on-line urgent care course and subsequent examinations (which includes the primary exam known as UCPEX). Aspiring clinicians have on-going skill assessments.

The curriculum includes a mandatory cultural competency and health equity element focusing on Hauora Māori (Māori health) principles, tikanga, and eliminating implicit bias to ensure equitable healthcare outcomes.

Successful candidates receive a Fellowship of the Royal New Zealand College of Urgent Care (FRNZCUC). They can then apply for vocational registration in urgent care medicine through the MCNZ.

A Fellow may use the postnominal FRNZCUC.

To maintain vocational registration with the Medical Council of New Zealand (MCNZ), practicing Fellows and registrars are continually recertified, which includes a minimum threshold of annual clinical hours

== Coat of Arms and Symbolism ==
Following the receipt of the "Royal" prefix in 2013 the college was formally granted armorial bearings by the College of Arms in 2017 confirming its status as an independent royal medical college. The college’s armorial bearings incorporate several symbols representing Aotearoa identity, medical history, and the nature of urgent care.

=== Colours and Shield ===
The shield uses blue and white, which are standard colours for urgent care in Aotearoa, alongside red to denote urgency. It features sprigs of Mānuka (tea tree) whose leaves and honey have traditional and modern medicinal and wound-care properties and a gold fleam, a historical lancet used by medieval physicians for blood-letting.

=== Crest ===
Above the shield, a sun in splendour represents round-the-clock (night and day) operations and the spread of knowledge. It is framed by Māori koru coils (symbolizing growth and the circle of life) and the stars of the Southern Cross.

=== Supporters ===
The shield is flanked by figures representing Hippocrates (symbolizing learning and medical doctrine) and Panacea, the Greek goddess of universal remedy.

=== Motto ===
The college's Latin motto is Semper sanamus, meaning "Care at all times".
