= Royal New Zealand College of General Practitioners =

Professional body for general practitioners in New Zealand

- Te Whare Tohu Rata o Aotearoa
- Abbreviation: RNZCGP
- Predecessor: New Zealand Council of the Royal College of General Practitioners
- Founded: 13 August 1973
- Type: Medical royal college
- Headquarters: Wellington
- Region served: New Zealand
- Services: Professional body for GPs in New Zealand
- Members: 6065 (2026)
- President: Dr Luke Bradford
- CEO: Toby Beaglehole
- Website: www.rnzcgp.org.nz
- Formerly called: New Zealand College of General Practitioners

The Royal New Zealand College of General Practitioners (RNZCGP) is a professional body representing the medical specialty of general practice in New Zealand. The college administers vocational training, sets and monitors quality standards, funds research, and provides advocacy for general practitioners (GPs) and their practices.

The college's motto is Cum Scientia Caritas which translates as ‘with knowledge, compassion’.

As of 2026, the college has approximately 6,000 members.

== History ==
The college was formed as a standalone entity in 1973, having previously been part of the British Royal College of General Practitioners. Following sign off from its British counterpart, the New Zealand College of General Practitioners was inaugurated and held its first conference in 1974. The college was given approval to affix "Royal" to the organisation's title in June 1979.

The college began offering continuing professional education in 1976, in the form of self-assessed questions and case studies.

== Training programmes ==
The college administers vocational training for doctors to specialise in general practice or in rural hospital medicine. Current registration with the Medical Council of New Zealand, plus two years of post-qualification experience are prerequisites for both programmes. Both training programmes may be studied part-time.

The General Practice Education Programme (GPEP) is a three-year training programme involving placements in general practices. GPEP must be completed to become vocationally registered as a General Practitioner (GP) by the Medical Council of New Zealand. Upon completion, graduates are also awarded Fellowship of the college (FRNZCGP).

Similarly, upon completion of the Rural Hospital Medicine Training Programme (RHMTP) graduates can apply for vocational registration as a rural hospital doctor by the Medical Council of New Zealand, and are awarded Fellowship of the Division of Rural Health (FDRHMNZ). The training programme takes a minimum of four years to complete.

In addition to professional certifications, the college offers continuing professional development programmes for existing GPs and doctors in rural hospitals.

== Organisation ==
The college is built from six components: the Board, National Advisory Council, Senior Management Team, Educational Advisory Group, chapters and faculty boards.

=== The Board ===
A culturally diverse Board governs the college; elected board members are general practitioners, supported by independent directors. The seven board members include:

- An elected President
- Three elected College Fellows
- A representative from Te Akoranga a Māui, the college's Māori chapter
- Up to two members appointed by the Board, who need not be members of the college

=== National Advisory Council ===
The council is the listening post for all College members and relays critical viewpoints from their local Faculty or Chapter regarding policy issues, priorities for policy work and other opinions from around New Zealand to the Board. The council is composed of one member from every Faculty and Chapter all over New Zealand.

== Other representative groups ==
=== Faculties ===
College faculties are based on geographical areas, and include: Northland, Auckland, Waikato/Bay of Plenty, Gisborne, Hawkes Bay, Manawatu, Taranaki, Wellington, Nelson-Marlborough, Canterbury, Otago, and Southland.

Faculty representation sallow members to be involved in discussion and decision-making at a regional level. All college members are automatically assigned to a regional faculty and will receive information about faculty activities directly.

=== Te Akoranga a Māui ===
The college's Māori representative group Te Akoranga a Māui is involved in every part of its work, from strategic level to operational level. Membership of Te Akoranga a Māui are open to members who identify as Māori.

The name of Te Akoranga a Māui holds special significance for its members and for the college. Māui refers to Sir Māui Pōmare, the first Māori doctor to graduate from any medical school, and Akoranga means teaching, learning and education.

With more than 150 members, Te Akoranga a Māui is the first indigenous representative group established in any Australian or New Zealand medical college.

=== Chapters ===
The college currently has four chapters based on major national areas of practice:

==== The Pacific Chapter ====
Made up of members who identify as Pacific. It also welcomes members who serve communities with large Pacific populations or have interest in Pacific health issues.

==== Registrars’ and Affiliates’ Chapter ====
The voice of registrars; GPEP1 seminar groups elect a representative. During GPEP2/3 a representative is elected from each learning group and one from Rural Hospital Medicine. The resulting committee works together to provide activities that support and represent registrars.

==== Rural General Practitioners’ Chapter ====
What issues are facing rural practitioners? How can we put a ‘rural lens’ over the work of the college? What initiatives could improve the quality of rural training and general practice? Rural GPs have the opportunity to connect and collaborate to address these questions through the Chapter's committees.

==== The Division of Rural Hospital Medicine ====
This Chapter serves as a hub to define and improve the body of knowledge for this specialist field, while providing education and collegial support. All Division of Rural Hospital Medicine New Zealand members automatically belong to this Chapter.

== Membership ==
Categories of membership of the college are split into four main groups:

- Fellow
- Member
- Associate in Training
- Associate in Practice

== Awards ==
The college confers a number of awards, including Distinguished Fellowship, for "outstanding service to the College or Division’s work, or the science or practice of medicine. Distinguished Fellows embody [the] motto 'cum scientia caritas' – with knowledge, compassion,’ and have made sustained contributions to general practice, medicine, or the health and wellbeing of the community". The notable Distinguished Fellows include Nikki Turner.

== Publications ==
Publications produced by this organisation include:

- The Journal of Primary Health Care (JPHC).
- GP Pulse, a current affairs magazine.
- ePulse, a e-newsletter carrying salient news items, information about consultations, events, and vacancies.
- Workforce Survey Reports, identifying areas of general practice that need attention, as well as shaping the primary care sector's strategic direction.
