= Nikki Turner (public health advocate) =

New Zealand vaccinologist and medical practitioner

Nicola Mary Turner
- Born: New Zealand
- Other name: Nikki Turner
- Education: 1985 Bachelor of Medicine and Surgery (University of Auckland); 2006 Masters of Public Health (University of Auckland); 2014 Doctorate of Medicine (University of Auckland).
- Scientific career
- Fields: Vaccine safety and effectiveness
- Workplaces: Immunisation Advisory Centre, University of Auckland.; Newtown Union Health Centre, Wellington, NZ.

Nicola Mary Turner is a New Zealand public health advocate who is a professor at the University of Auckland and medical director of the Immunisation Advisory Centre, an organisation that advises the New Zealand medical profession and the New Zealand Government. She has contributed to advisory committees for the New Zealand Ministry of Health, is a spokesperson for the Child Poverty Action Group (Aotearoa New Zealand) and works in general practice. Much of her research and outreach has focused on improving immunisation coverage and closing equity gaps for the national schedule vaccine delivery in New Zealand and she has commented publicly on these issues during COVID-19 pandemic in New Zealand.

== Education and career ==
Turner holds a Bachelor of Medicine and Surgery (MBChB), a Diploma of Obstetrics Gynaecology and Family Planning (Dip Obs) and a Masters of Public Health (MPH Hons) from the University of Auckland. She was awarded a Diploma of Paediatrics (DHC) by the UK Royal College of Physicians. In 2014, the University of Auckland awarded Turner a Doctorate of Medicine (MD) for a thesis titled Factors associated with immunisation coverage for the childhood immunisation programme in New Zealand: 1999–2012.

In 1997, in response to low immunisation coverage and equity gaps in the New Zealand immunisation programmes, Turner developed the Immunisation Advisory Centre, (IMAC) an organisation situated at the University of Auckland, that nationally provides independent and factual research-based scientific information regarding vaccine-preventable diseases and the benefits and risks of immunisation. Turner noted that at the time the Immunisation Advisory Centre was set up, there was a "vocal and influential anti-vaccination movement reflecting, an absence of trust in science and a primary healthcare system that wasn't very well organised...[but]...as the New Zealand community...got behind this, the angry anti-immunisation stuff [was] a lot less, because immunisation's normalised now as a positive part of raising healthy children. Whereas back then you had to make an active decision to immunise, now you have to make an active decision not to". As of 2023, Turner is Medical Directory for IMAC.

Turner was a senior lecturer at the University of Auckland from 2005 until becoming an associate professor in 2013. On 1 January 2014, she was appointed as a professor in the Department of General Practice and Primary Care at the same university.

Turner has been part of the General Practice team at Newtown Union Health Services (NUHS), Broadway, Wellington, since 2011, and is an associate and spokesperson for the Child Poverty Action Group.

== Research and writings ==
=== Improving vaccination coverage ===
Turner has been involved in research into how the structures and organisation of general practice are associated with immunisation coverage in New Zealand. A 2010 paper, co-authored by Turner concluded that while practice immunisation coverage and timeliness did vary widely in New Zealand, "organisational and structural aspects of general practices are key determinants of general practice immunisation delivery".

Turner co-authored an Immunisation Advisory Centre (IMAC) study in 2011 that assessed the effectiveness of the cold chain management for delivery of childhood vaccines from national stores to delivery sites in New Zealand.

In 2018, IMAC collated a synopsis of strategies used since the 1918 influenza pandemic to deal with unanswered questions about how to manage future pandemics. The data indicated that the burden of the disease in 1918 in New Zealand was inequitably carried by vulnerable populations such as the Maori, Pacific Island and Asian communities. In a related research project, Turner and epidemiologists Nick Wilson and Michael Baker presented data that showed the birth rate for Maori dropped disproportionately after the 2018 pandemic, confirming the importance of pregnant women being vaccinated against seasonal influenza to reduce the rate of stillbirths. In a later discussion about this research, Turner reiterated the importance of protecting pregnant women from any infection, and if vaccines were in short supply, prioritising them for "access to antivirals and ventilators in hospital intensive care units if they get sick".

=== Advocacy for children ===
In her role as spokesperson for Child Poverty Action Group, Turner commented in the media on the relationship between low income and poor child health, and in 2008 co-authored a research report which stated that poverty was causing "devastation" in the health sector, with data showing New Zealand children had "higher rates of preventable illness and deaths from injuries than children in almost any other OECD country". The report drew attention to the fact that Maori and Pasifika children were disproportionately affected by this.

In 2012, Turner, as a member of the Children's Commissioner Expert Advisory Group on Solutions to Child Poverty, contributed to a major report that explored how child poverty in New Zealand could be reduced. Turner later said she was disappointed at the response by the New Zealand government and that they had only focussed on a few areas instead of taking a fully systemic approach to reducing child poverty. This report supported the findings in a previous paper, endorsed by the New Zealand Medical Association and co-authored by Turner, which contended that overcrowding, poor nutrition, exposure to tobacco and stress contributed to creating a social environment in which the population was vulnerable and likely to have less access to health care services.

Commenting on a report released by The Asthma Foundation, Turner said it confirmed concerns that poverty and deprivation impacted greatly on respiratory disease in New Zealand children, and the underlying causes needed to be addressed to ensure that children and families had adequate income, good housing and easy access to health care. In 2015 after the Children's Commissioner released data showing that at the time, there were 305,000 children living in poverty in New Zealand – an increase of 45,000 from the previous year – Turner said that child poverty was now a national issue, not just for individual parents, and there appeared to be an unwillingness to resource a solution to the problem.

=== Closing equity gaps ===
Turner co-authored a paper in 2019 summarising the findings of a retrospective cohort study of New Zealand children (born 2006–2015), which identified that hospitalisation rates for infectious diseases since 1989 had increased disproportionately for Maori and Pacific children and those who were socioeconomically most deprived, but that those children who received the pneumococcal conjugate vaccine (PVC) between 2008 and 2014, were less likely to be hospitalized. The paper concludes that the use of PVC was associated with "reductions in ethnic and socioeconomic disparities in hospitalization".

Turner co-authored another report on a research study that showed foreign-born migrant children living in New Zealand had an overall lower vaccination rate than NZ-born migrant and non-migrant children. It was acknowledged that there needed to be an improvement in the way such data were gathered, highlighting the importance of having "better national surveillance and migrant-specific data related to vaccination coverage to help uncover health inequities among children living in NZ and inform immunisation policy and practice". A follow-up paper on this research highlighted that to get a better understanding of migrant health, data must be disaggregated to locate hidden trends, provide information about subsets and make vulnerable groups more visible.

Much of Turner's research and writing has been on the importance of people getting accurate information about immunisation, particularly to reassure parents that vaccines were safe. Turner has been actively involved in media discussions of vaccine safety including the Meningococcal vaccine in 2004 and the cervical cancer vaccine Gardasil in 2009.

Turner has highlighted the importance of building trust between the public and those delivering health programs, either government-funded, or at the level of general practice. She noted that the decision-making process for consent can be influenced by anti-vaccination views, but while making vaccinations mandatory would be helpful, there was a risk that some families might be less inclined to discuss their concerns openly, impacting their engagement with, and trust in, healthcare professionals.

== Commentary on COVID-19 in New Zealand ==
In May 2020, Turner, speaking as director for the Immunisation Advisory Centre, supported the use of a vaccine in managing the COVID-19 pandemic in New Zealand and highlighted that it was important to avoid issues of equity of access across the world by privileging the wealthier nations. She concurred with other experts that the vaccine was a key component in responding to the virus and cautioned against unrealistic hopes that it would happen quickly in New Zealand because of supply issues and prioritisation of the administration to the most vulnerable, and those at "heightened risk of infections like border workers and health staff".

When New Zealand confirmed the purchase of the Pfizer COVID-19 vaccine, Turner said that while the country had access to both clinical and "real world" data, and was well situated to approve it, there was no need to rush the process. She noted that because there was little "severe illness and death from this disease" in New Zealand, the country was in the privileged position of being able to "scrutinise the science, watch how the vaccine rollout goes for other countries." To Turner, the rollout of a vaccine in New Zealand would be planned and sequential, aiming ultimately for widespread community vaccination.

Turner spoke with Jesse Mulligan after two health workers in the United Kingdom had suffered allergic reactions to the COVID-19 vaccine early in December 2020, and noted that some reaction to any vaccine is always a possibility but "good quality services delivering vaccines" were crucial to deal with these reactions. She suggested people with very severe allergies did need to be careful and it was important good information about the strengths and limitations of this vaccine, based on clinical data that was appropriately scrutinized, was shared by the media, scientists and the general community .

In December 2021, Medsafe gave provisional approval for the vaccine to be used for children in age group of 5 - 11 year-olds in New Zealand. Turner told Corin Dann on Radio New Zealand that initial internal clinical data from the use of the vaccine for children overseas had shown it was being rolled out well. She noted that it didn't need to be mandatory but would protect children with other health issues or living in poverty, would limit the spread of COVID-19 in families and have less impact on schools. Prior to this approval, Turner acknowledged there were "pros and cons" about children getting the vaccine, but a strong case could be made that this would be in the interests of protecting the community. Turner stated that the gap for New Zealand children to get their second dose of COVID-19 vaccine needed to be longer than that for adults and maintaining it at eight weeks was likely to result in better immunity.

As booster vaccines for COVID-19 were rolled out in New Zealand early in 2022 with the wait time between the second and third doses shortened to three months, Turner responded to several suggestions about this. She refuted that the booster needed to be in the non-dominant arm, noting while it was good to keep fluid levels up during heat, drinking water, [won't] "make any difference to the vaccine response" and while stress on the immune system was understandable, there was little cause for concern. When the New Zealand government announced in May 2022 that there would be a second COVID-19 booster available to some members of the community, Turner expressed concern about the low rate of uptake for the first booster..."particularly the lower rate of boosters for older people and those with medical conditions...[adding]..."but still, there are quite a few people who feel like two doses aren't enough, and don't realise the importance of a booster".

In November 2022, when parents of a four-month-old baby in New Zealand who needed heart surgery requiring a blood transfusion refused to accept blood from a donor who had received the COVID-19 vaccine, Turner said there was no scientific evidence suggesting there would be any risk to the baby. She noted [that] "blood donations are carefully screened for safety to ensure it was a match for the recipient", and people with concerns about this should talk to a professional. Turner also told Newshub programme The Project, that doing a "one-off emergency screening to get blood from someone who is unvaccinated" might create the impression that there is a potential problem, and urged people to "sit down and work through where their fears and anxieties", concluding that the New Zealand health services were offering the best quality service to the baby.

== National advisory roles (New Zealand) ==
- 2021-Member of Strategic COVID-19 Public Health Advisory Group (SPHAG)
- 2020–present Member, COVID Vaccine Immunisation Implementation Advisory Group to the Ministry of Health
- 2020–present Member, COVID-19 Vaccine Technical Advisory Group (CV TAG)
- 2020 Member, The Immunisation Handbook Advisory Group
- 2015–present Chair, National Verification Committee for measles/rubella
- 2013–present Member, Well Child / Tamariki Ora Expert Advisory Group
- 2013 Member, Vaccine Safety Expert Advisory Group
- 2012–2018 Member, New Zealand Children's Commissioner's Expert Advisory Group on Solutions to Child Poverty
- 2011–present Member, PHARMAC advisory subcommittee for Immunisation

== Awards and distinctions ==
Turner was awarded an Honorary Fellowship of the New Zealand College of Public Health Medicine in 2021, and is a Fellow of the Royal New Zealand College of General Practitioners (RNZCGP). In 2020, Turner was a finalist for the Green Cross Health award for outstanding contribution to health at the inaugural New Zealand Primary Healthcare Awards.

Turner was the principal investigator leading the Vaccine Effectiveness arm for The Southern Hemisphere Influenza and Vaccine Effectiveness Research and Surveillance (SHIVERS) project (2012–2016) designed to measure the effectiveness of vaccination for influenza and other respiratory infectious diseases. In 2019, in recognition of their major contribution to influenza research, the SHIVERS team, including Turner, received the New Zealand Association of Scientists' Shorland Medal.
