= Helen Petousis-Harris =

New Zealand vaccinologist

- Born: Helen Aspasia Petousis-Harris
- Education: BSc: Biological Science, University of Auckland (1998) PGDipSc: Molecular Medicine – Distinction, University of Auckland (2006) PhD: Vaccination, University of Auckland (2012)
- Alma mater: University of Auckland
- Known for: Immunisation-related research
- Scientific career
- Fields: Vaccine safety and effectiveness
- Workplaces: University of Auckland
- Thesis: Factors associated with vaccine reactogenicity in school aged children and young adults following administration of two protein-based vaccines (2011)

Helen Aspasia Petousis-Harris is a New Zealand vaccinologist and associate professor in the Department of General Practice and Primary Health Care at the University of Auckland. She has been involved in research related to vaccination in New Zealand since 1998, with her main areas of focus being vaccine safety and effectiveness. Petousis-Harris has had a variety of lead roles in New Zealand and international organisations that focus on vaccination and is a regular media spokesperson in this field, especially during the COVID-19 pandemic.

== Career ==
From 1999 to 2002 Petousis-Harris was a researcher at the University of Auckland, working with the Immunisation Advisory Centre, a New Zealand-wide organisation based at the university. She continued in various roles at the centre, including honorary assistant research fellow and director of research from 1998. Between 2008 and 2011, she worked on her doctorate and wrote a thesis titled Factors associated with vaccine reactogenicity in school aged children and young adults following administration of two protein-based vaccines. Petousis-Harris was a senior lecturer at the Department of General Practice and Primary Health Care, University of Auckland from 2012 until February 2020 when she attained the position of associate professor.

In 2013 The Immunisation Advisory Centre (IMAC) set up the Vaccine Safety Expert Advisory Group, composed of "clinicians, scientists and policymakers who [had] either expertise and/or a professional interest in the safety of vaccines used in New Zealand", and Petousis-Harris has been a member of the group since it began.

Petousis-Harris became group director in 2018 of the Vaccine Datalink and Research Group, which is based at Auckland University and has a primary goal of "investigating the risks and benefits of vaccines using pharmacoepidemiologic approaches...[and]...vaccine development, vaccine immunology, and vaccine risk communication". Working with Steven Black, a "specialist in paediatric infectious diseases and vaccinology who had led major projects for the American Centres for Disease Control (CDC) and for the World Health Organization", Petousis-Harris established the internationally networked Global Vaccine Data Network (GVDN) in 2019. As of 2023 she remains co-director of GVDN, a role held since the beginning of the project.

Petousis-Harris was a member of the World Health Organization Global Advisory Committee on Vaccine Safety in 2017, being chair 2018–2020. and is a former member of the International Brighton Collaboration Science Board.

As from 2020, Petousis-Harris has been a member of the COVID-19 Immunisation Implementation Advisory Group (IIAG) which provides advice for the New Zealand Ministry of Health to implement the COVID-19 immunisation campaign, and part of the COVID-19 Vaccine Technical Advisory Group (CV TAG).

== Areas of expertise ==
=== Pneumococcal vaccines ===
A paper by Petousis-Harris in 2013 traced the history of the development of capsular polysaccharide vaccines against S. pneumoniae and noted the importance of this programme in reducing community-acquired pneumonia (CAP), bacterial meningitis, bacteremia and otitis media (OM), commonly known as middle ear infection. The same paper signalled concerns about ethnic inequalities in New Zealand with regard to hospital admissions due to this, and Petousis-Harris cited research that showed:

an increase in acute hospital admissions for infectious diseases in general between 1989 and 2008 and most significantly for LRI. Hospitalisation for pneumonia and influenza almost doubled during this time period and age-standardised hospitalisations for Māori and Pacific increased progressively throughout the 1990s

Petousis-Harris concluded that while vaccination was important for Maori and Pacific Island children, these inequalities may also result from factors such as overcrowding, poor housing and access to primary health care.

In 2015, research by Petousis-Harris and Colin Barber presented at the Annual Scientific Meeting of the Australasian Society for Infectious Diseases, showed preliminary figures that the rates of hospitalisation from invasive pneumococcal disease in children aged six years and under, had halved, with a 70% reduction for Maori and Pacific children. Prior to the conference, Petousis-Harris had drawn attention to the risks of children suffering permanent hearing loss if ear infections were not dealt with promptly by vaccination. In particular, along with her colleague, Colin Barber, she noted that compared to Pakeha children, almost twice as many Maori and Pacific Island children were at risk, with one-in-ten failing hearing tests when they started school. The study showed that vaccination helped reduce middle ear infections, and urged parents to monitor their children closely. Petousis-Harris earlier said the study demonstrated that the vaccine Synflorix reduced pneumonia, middle ear infections and hospitalisation from invasive pneumococcal disease (IPD).

=== Pertussis vaccination ===
Pertussis, also known as whooping cough, is a highly infectious airborne respiratory disease that often shows as uncontrollable coughing causing breathing difficulties and can result in death, with infants and young children being particularly vulnerable. Because pertussis is known to be caused by the bacterium Bordetella pertussis, vaccination is effective. A paper co-authored in 2019 by Petousis-Harris, however, claimed:

that in spite of vaccination having reduced mortality rates...an estimated 16 million pertussis cases and 195,000 child deaths [occurred globally] every year, with the greatest burden in low and middle-income countries. Furthermore, many high-income countries with high and stable vaccination rates, such as New Zealand, Australia and the United States, [had] an increasing pertussis burden and regular epidemics [were] not being prevented

The aim of this study was to investigate what could risk the effectiveness of pertussis vaccination, particularly for "infants between birth and six weeks of age born to mothers who received pertussis booster vaccinations during pregnancy and infants after the completion of the primary series (approximately five months old) to four years old". The authors were wanting to address gaps in knowledge due to the paucity of pertussis vaccination failure research by identifying who was most at risk of failure within the New Zealand primary immunisation schedule, and how common this failure was.

In 2016 Petousis-Harris and a team of researchers evaluated whether the switch from whole cell to acellular pertussis vaccine had contributed to the resurgence of pertussis disease in many countries which had made that change in the administration of the vaccine. The study assessed the duration of protection on 520,183 children using Infanrix, reporting on hospitalisation separately from notifications. The study found "a high level of protection with no reduction in VE (vaccine effectiveness) following both the primary course and the first booster dose. ...[and]...these findings [supported] a 3-dose primary course of acellular vaccine with no booster dose until 4 years of age".

Petousis-Harris took part in a cohort study in 2018 that explored safety outcomes in pregnant women in New Zealand who had received pertussis immunisation using Tdap vaccine. After conducting a retrospective observational study of women who received the vaccine during pregnancy, the authors concluded that there were no detectable adverse outcomes and were confident the study showed that Tdap could be administered safely to pregnant women. This was confirmed in another study on 793 women that concluded: "Vaccination with Tdap in pregnant women was well tolerated with no SAE likely to be caused by the vaccine." The impact on infants of Tdap vaccine in utero was evaluated in a 2019 study in which Petousis-Harris participated and the findings [supported] "the safety of administration of pertussis immunisation during pregnancy". Further research that monitored infants exposed to Tdap during pregnancy found data-based evidence that using Tdap at this time was effective in reducing pertussis in young children.

By March 2023 New Zealand faced a possible whooping cough epidemic. Petousis-Harris and Hannah Chisholm, an epidemiologist from Auckland University, explained how the usual cycles of herd immunity had been disrupted by COVID-19 restrictions, and with declining immunisation coverage, whooping cough along with measles, respiratory syncytial virus and influenza was likely to increase. Of particular concern was the effect on infants and young children, of whom around one third in New Zealand were said to be unvaccinated, and for Māori infants there was an even greater decline in coverage. The writers contended that infant fatalities could be prevented by high rates of vaccination by pregnant women and infants. It was also noted that other social and environmental factors that contributed to the spread of infectious such as housing conditions, needed to be dealt with by interventions and policies but this was a challenge because of an "under-resourced workforce, and a revised health system that [had] yet to demonstrate its worth".

=== Group B meningococcal vaccines ===
In 1991, New Zealand began experiencing an epidemic of meningococcal disease and to control this a strain-specific vaccine (MeNZB) was developed, which in July 2004, resulted in a mass vaccination of people under 20 years of age. The mass campaign per se ended in 2006 but continued as a publicly-funded vaccine for infants up to 10 months. When it was decided to discontinue the vaccination in April 2008, Petousis-Harris co-authored a paper that aimed to "provide a background to this decision and explore the advantages, disadvantages and other considerations with regard to ceasing MeNZB vaccination". The article noted that the vaccine's excellent safety profile was reflected in the fact that it had protected up to 80% of New Zealanders under 20 years of age, and there appeared to be little benefit in continuing the programme. Concern was expressed, however, that in spite of the programme, meningococcal B disease in New Zealand was still above the levels from before the epidemic and it was important to acknowledge that the country had a "poor immunisation uptake compared to other nations...[and]...change could have to be made to the immunisation schedule". It was suggested that these changes would need to address the low rate of immunisation of Maori. Petousis-Harris was involved in a research project in 2009 that tracked how the MeNZB campaign had been reflected in media headlines. The data showed that "26 out of 51 headlines [were] inaccurate when compared with the article content (51%), with a further 6 being misleading (total of 61%)...[leading to a conclusion that]... to maintain public confidence, health planners constantly need to develop and review their health promotion messages and relationships with the media".

Responding to a news item on 23 April 2020 that suggested people in New Zealand aged 13 to 29 were highly at risk and needed to be vaccinated against meningococcal disease again, Petousis-Harris explained that these were the people who were under 5 years of age during the last epidemic, and agreed they needed another vaccination. She further noted that because of its flu-like symptoms it could be difficult to diagnose and progress quickly in "young adults living in crowded conditions and those with underlying health conditions...". Newshub, reporting on the same research cited in the article, claimed that there had been an 82% increase in the number of New Zealand infants contracting meningococcal disease in comparison to 2019. In response, Petousis-Harris stressed the importance of people being aware of when they were last vaccinated because protection was from 5 – 10 years, meaning young people and adolescents could be at risk.

In 2017, Petousis-Harris was the lead author for seminal research that provided evidence of a link between the meningococcal vaccine and a cure for gonorrhoea. Introducing the study, that authors noted that previously there had been no effective vaccine developed for gonorrhoea, but some surveillance data suggested that the outer membrane vesicle meningococcal group B (MeNZB) vaccines affected the incidence of gonorrhoea. Their research, therefore, was a retrospective case-control study of New Zealand patients at sexual health clinics aged 15–30 years who were diagnosed with gonorrhoea or chlamydia, or both and were born between 1 January 1984, and 31 December 1998 – making them eligible to receive MeNZB during the earlier pandemic. Altogether there were 14730 cases and controls analysed and the data showed "vaccinated individuals were significantly less likely to be cases than controls (511 [41%] vs 6424 [51%]". Interpreting the data, the authors concluded:

Exposure to MeNZB was associated with reduced rates of gonorrhoea diagnosis, the first time a vaccine has shown any protection against gonorrhoea. These results [provided} a proof of principle that can inform prospective vaccine development not only for gonorrhoea but also for meningococcal vaccines.

The research was generally received positively internationally, and responding to one article, Petousis-Harris stated: "This is the first time a vaccine has shown any protection against gonorrhoea,...[and]...the potential ability of a vaccine to provide even moderate protection against gonorrhoea is of substantial public health interest." Two researchers from the University of Manitoba did disagree with the authors' conclusion that their "findings [provided] experimental evidence that these vaccines could offer moderate cross-protection against [gonorrhoea]". The research team responded, agreeing with some of the points raised about randomised controlled trials, but clarified that "their study [was] on vaccine effectiveness...normally assessed using observational methods such as case-control and cohort designs".

Petousis-Harris agreed with a New Zealand news item which said this "exciting" Kiwi research showed a vaccine for gonorrhoea was close for the first time, and she also noted that even though the exact details of how the mechanism of vaccine worked, the findings would inform future development of both meningococcal and gonorrhoea vaccines. She told Susan Scutti, in an interview on CNN, that "even moderate protection against the sexually transmitted disease could have significant impact because the bacteria that cause it are very tricky...[and]...develop resistance to drugs by transferring genes in atypical ways and recombining with related bacterial species".

== Public policy positions ==
=== Immunization coverage ===
Early in her career, Petousis-Harris held concerns about the quality of immunization coverage in New Zealand and was involved in research programmes to identify primary care factors that impacted this. In 2002, she collaborated on a scientific paper that considered the degree to which parents' knowledge of and attitudes toward immunization affected decisions to have their children vaccinated. While parents in the study shared a desire to keep their children healthy, some themes were identified as barriers to immunization. These included a fear of vaccines, a lack of knowledge of immunisation, negativity toward health providers and difficulties in getting immunization. There was also a word of caution about whether whanau Maori were involved in decisions that would link to the family group in a way that was non-blaming. The paper cited surveys from Area Health Boards in New Zealand in the 1990s that found in general, 68–80% of caregivers felt they did not have enough information about vaccination, and between 2–8% did not feel immunization was important. By 1996, this figure was 3.7–10%.

In 1998, as part of a wider strategy to increase immunisation rates, the New Zealand Ministry of Health funded a national toll-free hotline, hosted at the University of Auckland. Petousis-Harris was part of a team that analysed data collected on this line with a goal to compare the caller profiles and the nature of their inquiries over equal periods between 1999 and 2003. The research paper, co-authored by Petousis-Harris and released in 2005, showed changes in caller profiles, including use of the line by a higher number of health professionals, many of whom referred patients directly to the service, or were informed enough to respond to parental questions. The researchers concluded that callers from the general population, who wanted information or had concerns as a result of exposure to material "from people with extreme anti-immunisation views", could have their doubts and fears allayed, with the hotline being able to "monitor community concerns...[and support]...communication strategies to respond in a more effective and targeted fashion".

Petousis-Harris was involved in a national telephone survey in 2000 which showed 12% of the mothers involved were not convinced that vaccination prevented disease, and was on another team which included Nikki Turner, that carried out the first national survey on New Zealand family physicians to find their views on patient barriers to immunization. Supporting the findings from the earlier study, the largest barrier identified by the physicians for parents was fear, often due to lack of information or misinformation about vaccines, but they did not feel that difficulties accessing services was a major barrier for parents. The second largest barrier was the lack of funding for health providers. The survey concluded:

There are key issues from these findings to be considered in strategies to improve coverage levels in NZ. Firstly the need for an increased focus on family physician education needs to broaden their knowledge base, particularly in the area of contraindications to vaccination. Secondly, extra resources and strategies to assist with more effective communication and positive support for parents are required. Thirdly a review of the present funding of providers for immunisation services which is seen as a significant barrier to efforts to increase coverage

Petousis-Harris was involved in conducting research in 2010 that further explored this by focussing on how "structural and organisational characteristics of general practices" may impact immunization coverage and timely delivery. The data showed that systems which enabled children to register at a young age and where there were adequate staff, resulted in improved coverage and the timeliness of delivery. It noted that socioeconomic deprivation in the practice population was a determinant in the effectiveness of immunization delivery and children living in households with poverty-related issues suffered more frequently from acute illness. Research in 2012 in Auckland, concluded that if infants had nominated general practices, the rate of first immunizations at the right time was extremely high, but noted that this dropped off for babies with no nominated provider and it was important for the local district health boards to follow up on this. Practice nurses in New Zealand were also surveyed and the data showed that they identified similar barriers to immunisation as the studies conducted with New Zealand mothers and physicians, although some of the nurses themselves showed a lack of knowledge about the safety of vaccines. which, in line with overseas research cited in the survey discussion, supported the need for ongoing vaccinator training for practitioners. The role of New Zealand media (magazines and newspapers) in affecting immunisation uptake was researched by Petousis-Harris and others in 2007 and the findings generally showed a trend to less alarmist and anti-immunization written reports and acknowledged the role of the Immunization Advisory Centre and the New Zealand Ministry of Health in providing media-trained people who can talk on immunization issues.

=== COVID-19 pandemic ===
Early in 2020, when most of the cases of COVID-19 were still in China, and before it was declared a pandemic by The World Health Association on 11 March, Petousis-Harris published an opinion piece on the University of Auckland website which explained the background of the virus and indicated that the swift response of international authorities was a good sign a vaccine would be developed quickly. She urged people to not be influenced by misinformation, get scientific information and avoid panicking. Interviewed on New Zealand television (5 March 2020), Petousis-Harris clarified that the virus was most likely spread by respiratory secretions such as saliva and mucus and people needed to be careful to wash their hands regularly, particularly at airports.

As New Zealand prepared to come out of a month-long lockdown on 24 April 2020, Petousis-Harris answered questions about COVID-19 from the New Zealand public live on a stuff Q&A session. Issues covered included the length of time to develop a vaccine, how safe it was likely to be and whether it would be mandatory in New Zealand. Also on 24 April 2020, she agreed with the Prime Minister, Jacinda Ardern, that New Zealand could eliminate COVID-19 because the country had shown "decisive action, with strong leadership and very clear communications to everybody". By May 2020, Petousis-Harris was giving information on the systems and organisations that would advise, measure, monitor and assess vaccine safety, and was confident that with good tools, the process had begun and no steps were being omitted, in spite of the risks. In an interview with Radio New Zealand on 19 May 2020, Petousis-Harris explained how vaccines work and although the development of an effective one was lengthy and expensive, estimated that there could be one for COVID-19 by the end of 2020. On 10 September 2020, when one of the companies developing a COVID-19 virus put a hold on its trials due to a participant experiencing a serious health event, Petousis-Harris clarified that this was no cause for concern as it was about ensuring levels of "rigour and standards...[that are]...applied to all vaccines – at least those receiving support from CEPI, or the Coalition for Epidemic Preparedness Innovation".

On 11 September 2020 an item on Newshub focused on an international study which was carried out in 2019 before COVID-19 that had shown only 40.1% of the New Zealanders surveyed strongly agreed vaccines are safe. Petousis-Harris agreed this was part of a global perception [and] "New Zealand [was] no exception to changes in public attitudes around vaccination and it [was] not always good news". In response to this, in September 2020, Petousis-Harris published an article assessing the safety of COVID-19 vaccines. She noted the speed at which they were being developed required vigilance in monitoring of the safety of a vaccine before deployment, and required unprecedented international collaboration. The article backgrounded the traditional process of developing vaccines which had previously taken 10–15 years but noted it was looking possible that, due to developments in technology, the response to this virus would result in a safe vaccine in a shorter timeframe. After covering the phases of the clinical trials, the roles of agencies such as the World Health Organisation Global Advisory Committee on Vaccine Safety in monitoring this process was explained, and while it was acknowledged that the world did have the tools to effectively monitor the safety of vaccines, the article concluded:

As we well know from extensive experience, vaccine safety issues can threaten not only the success of any COVID-19 vaccine programme but also routine immunisation programmes. It is vital we get this right and we have the tools and the expertise to do so and to do it well.

Promising news of a vaccine that showed 90% success rate was acknowledged by Petousis-Harris as a positive step and even though testing was still in its early stages, and how long the effects of the vaccine last was not confirmed, she said it was a "huge step in the fight to eliminate the virus and a good sign for New Zealand". Petousis-Harris addressed concerns in the media on 17 November 2020 that more prosperous countries may pre-purchase a vaccine at the expense of less wealthy countries with higher death rates and said:

Speaking from an epidemiological point of view, you tend to see higher effectiveness where there's more disease pressure. It's important to ensure there is access for all countries, including those who can't afford it.

Petousis-Harris responded enthusiastically to the news on 17 November 2020 that New Zealand had signed agreements to obtain the vaccine developed by Pfizer and was considering a deal with Moderna. She was confident that following a review of the vaccines by the Government's Vaccine Strategy Taskforce, and approval by Medsafe, there would be enough purchased for everybody in the country, with prioritised distribution beginning early in 2021. She said there was no evidence that profit was a driving force, and while companies did need to cover their costs, some were not focused on profits for a period of time. The following day, Petousis-Harris said she was surprised at a suggestion that New Zealanders could have to pay for a COVID-19 vaccine saying, "we've never charged for a vaccine under these circumstances. Everything I've heard is that it would be available for free".

When it looked likely that the Pfizer BioNtech and Janssen Biotech vaccines for COVID-19 would be rolled out in New Zealand in early December 2020, Petousis-Harris was one of a group of experts who discussed some of the risks associated with this. She said it was reasonable to be concerned about the rollout of the vaccine but planning at high levels was underway to ensure that problems with recent rollouts of the measles and influenza vaccines would be avoided. While she noted some of the potential issues when vaccinating older people in New Zealand, Petousis-Harris was confident the vaccine had been thoroughly tested, it would not be mandatory in that country and was safe.

During the rollout of the COVID vaccine in New Zealand in 2021, when the group Voices for Freedom, co-founded by Claire Deeks, distributed pamphlets that contained misinformation about the response to the COVID-19 pandemic, Petousis-Harris joined other health professionals and scientists in debunking all of the claims in the documents. In an opinion piece about one of the flyers, Petousis-Harris said she was "addressing a list of falsehoods being posted widely across Aotearoa New Zealand...[and]...claims that suggest there are an alarming rate of deaths and serious injury caused by the vaccines are deeply misguided and rely on the intentional abuse of data from spontaneous vaccine safety surveillance systems". When providing expert advice for the preparation of an article in the Western Leader, Petousis-Harris stated that the trials for COVID vaccines had been "more stringent and transparent because the world [was] watching".

In November 2021, Petousis-Harris provided input and independent commentary, along Amy Chan, for an article that "summarised evidence-based strategies for countering vaccine hesitancy and misinformation...[and suggested]... techniques to support healthcare providers when engaging with individuals whose vaccine hesitancy [had] resulted from exposure to vaccine misinformation".

Following the death of a Dunedin man in November 2021, from what was reported in the New Zealand media at the time as "likely due to vaccine-related myocarditis", Petousis-Harris in the same article, said [that] "although vaccine-related myocarditis did happen, it was very rare and the risks of the vaccine were greatly outweighed by the risk of contracting Covid-19".

In a ruling on 15 February 2022, with regard to mandated vaccinations for members of the police and defence forces, a New Zealand High Court judge stated [he was] "not satisfied that the Crown [had] put forward sufficient evidence to justify the measures that have been imposed, even giving it some benefit of the doubt". Petousis-Harris expressed disappointment with the decision which she said undermined what were temporary mandates there in the interest of community safety.

While experts generally welcomed the decision of the New Zealand government to offer second COVID-19 booster shots to vulnerable people in the community in July 2022, concerns were expressed about the low rate of uptake of the first booster in the country. Petousis-Harris said it was possible a lot of people didn't realise the effectiveness of the booster and thought that being double-dosed meant being 'fully-vaccinated', while others may have felt the extra booster was not necessary once they have had the virus.

In November 2022, Petousis-Harris urged the Government to accelerate its COVID-19 booster rollout in response to rising cases, hospitalisation rates, and deaths during the third wave of COVID-19 cases that year. She also advocated introducing the Bivalent vaccine to combat new COVID-19 strains.

== Awards ==
In 2018 Petousis-Harris was awarded a five-year Dean's Fellowship by the Faculty of Medical and Health Sciences, University of Auckland, to research infectious diseases and the vaccines that help prevent them. In receiving the award, Petousis-Harris shared:

I have developed a passion for the science of vaccines and vaccination. After early work on the social aspects of vaccination I learned that two of the key challenges to good immunisation policy and high public confidence in vaccine programmes centred on the perceived effectiveness and safety of vaccines, coupled with the art of communication.

Petousis-Harris was a semi-finalist in the Kiwibank New Zealander of the Year Awards, 2020. This award honours a person who contributes to the wellbeing of New Zealand through "their inspiration and leadership", and she was recognised for more than 20 years of research related to immunisation.

In 2021 Petousis-Harris was shortlisted for the Nature Research Award for Driving Global Impact as an acknowledgement of her work on vaccine safety and effectiveness.
