= ReCOV =

Vaccine candidate against COVID-19

Vaccine description
- Target: SARS-CoV-2
- Vaccine type: Protein subunit

Clinical data
- Routes of administration: Intramuscular

Identifiers
- CAS Number: 2696273-05-7

ReCOV is a COVID-19 vaccine candidate developed by Jiangsu Rec-Biotechnology Co Ltd.
