= Immunisation Advisory Centre =

New Zealand-wide organisation

The Immunisation Advisory Centre
- Abbreviation: IMAC
- Formation: 1997; 29 years ago
- Location: Auckland, New Zealand
- Director: Nikki Turner
- Website: www.immune.org.nz

The Immunisation Advisory Centre (IMAC) is a New Zealand-wide organisation which provides information and training about immunization and vaccine-preventable diseases to health care professionals, government bodies, and individuals. It co-ordinates the nation's immunisation programmes, policy advice and research. It was launched in 1997, and is based at The University of Auckland.

== Recurring situations ==
Every year, IMAC is involved in planning, promoting, and monitoring the delivery of the seasonal influenza vaccine.

They are also called on to comment on social factors, such as the role that social media might have in spreading anti-vaccine conspiracy theories.

== Response to outbreaks ==
=== Measles (2019) ===
In 2011, there were nearly 600 cases of measles in NZ. By 2017, the World Health Organization declared that measles was eradicated from New Zealand. So the only cases originate in people arriving from overseas who carry the disease. But there was an outbreak in 2019 and by November 2019 over 2,000 cases had been reported that year, a third of which required hospitalisation. Most cases were people who were not vaccinated, or it was not known whether they had been vaccinated. The outbreak reached its peak in September 2019, and it took until 11-17 January 2020 before there was the first week without any new cases.

IMAC director Nikki Turner released a paper analysing the factors that drove this event. It is suspected to have originated from Disneyland. And a generation born between 1982 and 2007 had low immunization rates, allowing the disease to spread once it gets in. Vaccination records are incomplete for that period, as the National Immunisation Register was only introduced in 2005. The IMAC instigated a program to identify the gaps in immunization, and offer the affected people information so they can fill in the gaps. Turner said: "New Zealand, I believe, needs to offer at least a single measles-containing vaccine to everybody under 50, who does not have a clear record." In February 2020, the Ministry of Health announced funding of NZ$23 million to build on this initiative with a combined MMR vaccine catch-up programme.

=== COVID-19 (2020-2021) ===
The COVID-19 pandemic arrived in New Zealand early in 2020, with the first case reported on 28 February and the first fatality reported on 29 March, the same week that New Zealand declared a state of national emergency and went into a complete lock-down.

In addition to providing independent information, in February 2021 the Ministry of Health contracted IMAC to provide training to staff who will administer the vaccines. The COVID-19 vaccination rollout which started in March 2021 is the biggest such program ever undertaken in NZ, so the IMAC briefed Members of Parliament on how the available vaccines work and the international data about effectiveness and side effects, advised the government on development of the four-stage vaccination framework, and worked closely with the medical profession to educate and co-ordinate the doctors. Spokespeople from IMAC frequently provide commentary to the media on the status of the vaccination programme.
