= Medsafe =

New Zealand government agency

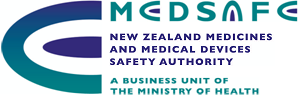

Agency overview
- Formed: 1998
- Headquarters: 133 Molesworth Street, Wellington
- Employees: 60 (2011)
- Parent agency: Ministry of Health
- Website: http://www.medsafe.govt.nz/

Medsafe, the New Zealand Medicines and Medical Devices Safety Authority, is the medical regulatory body run by the New Zealand Ministry of Health, administering the Medicines Act 1981 and Medicines Regulations 1984.

== Operations ==
Medsafe employs approximately 60 staff members in two offices. The head office, based in Wellington, New Zealand, handles "centralised administrative functions, product approval, and standard settings." The Investigation and Border Control operates out of the Auckland office.
