= Medical Council of New Zealand =

New Zealand Organization

- Te Kaunihera Rata o Aotearoa
- Formation: 1867
- Type: Professional association
- Headquarters: Wellington, New Zealand
- Members: Physicians, Surgeons and Medical practitioners
- Official language: English
- Key people: Sir George Grey (President of Founding Board)
- Website: www.mcnz.org.nz

The Medical Council of New Zealand (Māori: Te Kaunihera Rata o Aotearoa) is the peak national standards and assessment body for medical education and training. It is responsible for the registration of doctors and has the power to suspend or remove the right to practise medicine in New Zealand. (Note: Subject to a decision by the Health Practitioner's Disciplinary Tribunal, as set out in Health Practitioners Competence Assurance Act 2003 (101 (Penalties)). New Zealand Government. 18 September 2003.) Its responsibilities are defined by the Health Practitioners Competence Assurance Act 2003 and it is funded by practitioner fees paid by all practising doctors in New Zealand.

== See also ==
- Cartwright Inquiry
- Health care in New Zealand
