= NZ Pass Verifier =

New Zealand COVID-19 app

The NZ Pass Verifier is a free mobile app developed by the New Zealand Ministry of Health for businesses and organisations to scan and verify their customers' My Vaccine Pass certificates. The app was launched on 23 November 2021 for use on smartphones.

== Description ==
The NZ Pass Verifier can be downloaded on a range of smartphones including iOS and Android devices. The app works on iOS devices with an iOS 11 system or above. The Pass Verifier also operates on Android devices with an Android 6.0 system or above. To scan My Vaccine Pass QR codes, the Pass Verifier app requires a camera with a resolution of at least 5 megapixels (2,560 x 1,960 pixels).

The NZ Pass Verifier was developed by the tech company MATTR under a Health Ministry contract. The same company also developed the country's My Vaccine Pass domestic app and international vaccine certificate.

Authentic vaccine certificates will register as a green tick on the Pass Verifier app. The Verifier app can be used to verify if a person is fully vaccinated or has the appropriate exemption and can enter the premises. The Pass Verifier does not store any personal data other than a person's name or date of birth. The app uses NZ COVID Pass specification to decode the QR code and verify the authenticity of the pass using Elliptic-curve cryptography.

The Verifier app needs to know the identity of the user and also operates on the venue's device, which doesn't store any personal data and works offline. Thus, the Verifier and My Vaccine Pass apps and their functions cannot be combined into one app. To address this shortcoming, computer systems engineer and University of Auckland research fellow Dr Andrew Chen has recommended using photo identification and the NZ COVID Tracer app to supplement these two apps. Chen has cautioned that a photo identification requirement may discriminate against individuals under the age of 18 years who are not required to possess photo ID and those who do not possess photo ID in their preferred name. In addition, Chen has recommended that businesses with repeat customers keep records of their customers' vaccination status or develop their own record keeping apps.

== History ==
The NZ Pass Verifier was first launched on 23 November 2021. During its launch, COVID-19 Response Minister Chris Hipkins confirmed that essential services such as supermarkets, pharmacies, health and disability services were exempt from using the Pass Verifier app. However, large-scale events and other businesses are required to use the Verifier app.

On 24 November, Director-General of Health Ashley Bloomfield confirmed that the NZ Pass Verifier would not be compulsory for all businesses to use; superseding an earlier Government announcement that all businesses had to use the app. In response, digital contact tracing expert Chen expressed concern that people could gain entry to businesses using false vaccine passes without a verifier app to validate them. To address this problem, Chen has advocated that venues that are required to check for vaccine passes scan the vaccine passes' QR code against the Pass Verifier app. In early December 2021, Business Wairarapa general manager Nicola Belsham helped promote awareness of the NZ Pass Verifier app among local businesses in the Wairarapa region.
