= COVID-19 Response (Vaccinations) Legislation Act 2021 =

Act of Parliament in New Zealand

New Zealand Parliament
- Royal assent: 25 November 2021

Legislative history
- Introduced by: Chris Hipkins
- First reading: 23 November 2021
- Second reading: 23 November 2021
- Third reading: 23 November 2021

Related legislation
- COVID-19 Public Health Response Act 2020
- Status: Expired

The COVID-19 Response (Vaccinations) Legislation Act 2021 is an Act of Parliament to provide a legal framework for the New Zealand Government's COVID-19 Protection Framework and vaccination mandates. The bill was introduced under urgency and passed in law on 23 November 2021. While the bill was supported by the Labour Government and their Green coalition partner, it was opposed by the opposition National, ACT, and Māori parties, which criticised the rushed and divisive nature of the legislation and claimed that vulnerable communities would be adversely affected.

From 5 April 2022, the Government eased vaccine mandate requirements for teachers, Police, Defence Force personnel and businesses requiring vaccine passes. On 12 September, the Government scrapped the COVID-19 Protection Framework and lifted the vaccine mandate for health and disability workers on 27 September 2022.

== Key points ==
As an omnibus bill, the COVID-19 Response (Vaccinations) Legislation Act 2021 amends the COVID-19 Public Health Response Act 2020 and the Employment Relations Act 2000 to give the Government and employers greater mandate to require employees to receive COVID-19 vaccines. The Bill also has a sunset clause for the repeal of the provisions of the COVID-19 Response (Vaccinations) Legislation Act 2021 on the date that the COVID-19 Public Health Response Act 2020 is repealed.

=== COVID-19 Public Health Response Act ===
The COVID-19 Response (Vaccinations) Legislation Act introduces the following amendments:

- Section 5(3) allows the Director-General of Health to issue a notice specifying COVID-19 vaccination exemption criteria and the required doses for each COVID-19 vaccine or combination of COVID-19 vaccines.
- Section 9 allows the Minister for Workplace Relations and Safety, the Minister for COVID-19 Response, or any minister under any warrant or the authority of the Prime Minister to make COVID-19 orders under Section 11.
- The amended Section 11 specifies several orders that can be made under the Act including ordering someone to stay in specific premises, permitting entry to specific premises, restricting travel and movement, restricting work carrying out by infected workers, the dosage of COVID-19 vaccines, and the regulation of COVID-19 vaccine certificates.
- Section 17 requires the Person Conducting a Business or Undertaking (PCBU) to keep vaccination records, prevent affected persons (other than an exempt or authorised person) to carry out specified work unless vaccinated.
- Section 23a gives authorised enforcement persons the power to direct person to produce evidence of compliance with a specified COVID-19 measures.
- Section 33AA allows the Governor-General at the recommendation of the Prime Minister to make regulations prescribing an assessment tool that an PCBU may use to ensure that workers are vaccinated and required to undergo medical examination or testing for COVID-19.
- Section 33AB allows PCBU to assess that workers are vaccinated and undergo medical examination or testing for COVID-19. The PCBU must also take steps to protect the worker's personal information.
- Section 34B states that personal information may not be held, stored, used, or disclosed by the person except for the purposes of ascertaining whether an individual has been vaccinated, issued with a COVID-19 vaccination certificate, or are complying with the Public Health Response Act, a COVID-19 health order, and the Health Act 1956.
- Recognises the My Vaccine Pass and International Travel Vaccination Certificate as COVID-19 vaccination certificates.

=== Employment Relations Act 2000 ===
- A new Schedule 3A gives employees paid-time off for COVID-19 vaccinations.
- Schedule 3A allows for the termination of employment agreements for failing to comply with vaccination mandates under the requirements of the COVID-19 Public Health Response Act 2020 or a COVID-19 order.

== History ==
Minister for COVID-19 Response Chris Hipkins introduced the COVID-19 Response (Vaccinations) Legislation Bill during its first reading on 23 November 2021. The bill passed its first reading by a margin of 85 to 35. The Labour, Green, and ACT parties supported the bill while the National and Te Pāti Māori (Māori Party) opposed it. National's COVID-19 spokesperson Chris Bishop and fellow National MPs Scott Simpson, and Penny Simmonds objected to the bill on the grounds that it was rushed and lacked a select committee process. Labour MPs Hipkins, Liz Craig, Tracey McLellan, and Green MP Elizabeth Kerekere defended the bill, claiming that it supported the Government's COVID-19 Protection Framework (traffic-light system) and vaccination efforts. ACT leader David Seymour initially supported the bill as part of a constructive approach to supporting the Government's COVID-19 response while expressing concerns about the bill's vague language relating to business operations. Te Pāti Māori co-leader Debbie Ngarewa-Packer objected to the bill on the grounds that the Government's vaccination mandate and traffic light framework did not comply with the Treaty of Waitangi.

During the in-committee stage, Parliament rejected several amendments by National MPs regarding vaccination policies, laboratory testing, easing travel restrictions on the basis of negative COVID-19 tests, exemptions for places of worship, funeral services, and tangihanga, and New Zealand Bill of Rights Act 1990 and human rights safeguards.

During the third reading, ACT leader David Seymour joined the National Party in criticising the legislation, describing it as a "constitutional outrage" and attacking the Government's management of the COVID-19 pandemic and economy. Te Pāti Māori co-leader Ngarewa-Packer opposed the bill, claiming that the Government's COVID-19 Protection Framework would endanger Māori lives and well-being. Labour and Green MPs, particularly McLellan and Kerekere defended the Government's traffic light system and vaccine passes. The bill passed its final reading by a margin 75 (Labour and Greens) to 45 votes (National, ACT, Māori).

== Responses ==
Prior to its passage, Human Rights Commission chief Paul Hunt described the COVID-19 Response (Vaccinations) Legislation Bill as "highly problematic" both constitutionally and in terms of New Zealand's human rights and Treaty of Waitangi obligations. He also opined that the Bill should be subject to a full parliamentary select committee as soon as it had passed into law.

Victoria University of Wellington law Professor Dr Dean Knight was supportive of the legislation but expressed concern about its rapid passage. While the Ministry of Justice advised Attorney-General David Parker that the bill was consistent with the New Zealand Bill of Rights Act, its lawyers expressed concern about the "extremely shot frame of time" relating to the legislation's passage.

In early December 2021, Attorney-General Parker defended the hasty passage of the law, stating that "it would have been impossible to avoid a 24-hour urgent lawmaking spree." Parker also said that New Zealand should not allow the choices of the unvaccinated minority to hold back its progress in combating the COVID-19 pandemic.

On 3 December 2021, University of Auckland commercial law Associate Professor Gehan Gunasekara along with Dr Marcin Betkier and Kathryn Dalziel of the Privacy Foundation New Zealand expressed concern about the lack of a select committee process that would have allowed public consultation and the opaque language relating to the protection of COVID-19 contact tracing and vaccination information. They also expressed concerns about the protection of contact tracing information and the safety of software used for storing the My Vaccine Pass software on phones.

== Phasing out ==
On 23 March 2022, Ardern announced that the New Zealand Government would ease several of the COVID-19 Protection Framework's "red setting" restrictions including lifting the My Vaccine Pass and vaccine mandate requirements for teachers, Police, Defence Force staff and businesses from 5 April 2022. The opposition National Party's COVID-19 spokesperson Chris Bishop welcomed the elimination of the My Vaccine Pass requirement and called for the Government to ditch the COVID-19 Protection Framework. By contrast, the Greens' health spokesperson Teanau Tuiono described the easing of social distancing and vaccine mandate requirements as harmful to young children under the age of five.

On 12 September 2022, Ardern announced that the entire traffic light system would be dropped at 11:59 pm that night. This included the scrapping of vaccine and testing requirements for all travellers entering New Zealand. In addition, the Government's vaccine mandate for health and disability workers was eliminated at 11:59 pm on 26 September. However, some employers would be allowed to require employees to be vaccinated against COVID-19 due to health and safety requirements.

On 27 November 2023, the incoming National-led coalition government confirmed that it would end all remaining COVID-19 vaccine mandates and hold an independent inquiry into the Government's response to the COVID-19 pandemic.
