= COVID-19 Public Health Response Act 2020 =

Act of Parliament in New Zealand

New Zealand Parliament
- Royal assent: 13 May 2020
- Commenced: 13 May 2020

Legislative history
- Introduced by: David Parker
- First reading: 12 May 2020
- Second reading: 12 May 2020
- Third reading: 13 May 2020

Amended by
- COVID-19 Response (Vaccinations) Legislation Act 2021
- Status: Repealed

The COVID-19 Public Health Response Act 2020 is a standalone legislation passed by the New Zealand Parliament on 13 May 2020 to provide a legal framework for dealing with the COVID-19 pandemic in New Zealand over the next two years or until the COVID-19 pandemic is brought under control. The Act allows the Minister of Health (or the Director-General of Health in specified circumstances) to make orders under Section 11 to give effect to the public health response to the COVID-19 in New Zealand. In late 2024, the COVID-19 Public Health Response Act 2020 was repealed by Parliament.

== Key provisions ==
The COVID-19 Public Health Response Act provides the legislative framework for the New Zealand Government's response to the COVID-19 pandemic. It applies all alert levels under the Government's COVID-19 Alert Level Framework, replaces the country's state of emergency orders, and empowers police and other "enforcement officers" to apply various lockdown restrictions including closing premises or roads, banning travel and public gatherings, and requiring people to self-isolate at home or with their social bubbles.

The Act empowers the Minister of Health to make "section 11" orders, which are based on sections 70 and 92L of the Health Act 1956. Section 20 of the Act gives enforcement officers including the Director General of Health, medical officers, Police officers, and any person authorised by the Director General to enter any land, building, craft, vehicle, place, or thing without a warrant if they have "reasonable grounds" to believe that a person is failing to comply with any aspect of a section 11 order. Enforcement officers also have the power to shut down businesses or undertakings that are operating in violation of section 11 orders. Sections 26 and 26 also provide criminal penalties including fines and imprisonment terms not exceeding six months for those caught violating "section 11" orders.

The Act also has a two-year sunset clause and will automatically be repealed unless it is continually refreshed by the New Zealand House of Representatives every 90 days. The Bill received royal assent on 13 May. Following lobbying from the Māori Council, the Act was amended to remove any specific references to marae and to require that any warrantless search be reported to the relevant marae committee.

=== Amendments ===
On 23 November 2021, the Government passed the COVID-19 Response (Vaccinations) Legislation Act 2021 which introduced several amendments to the COVID-19 Public Health Response Act 2020. Notable amendments include:

- Empowering the Director-General of Health to specify COVID-19 vaccination exemption criteria and COVID-19 vaccine dosages.
- Entrenching stay-at-home orders, permitting entry to specific premises, restricting the type of work carried out by infected workers, and the regulation of COVID-19 vaccine certificates.
- Requiring Persons Conducting a Business or Undertaking (PCBU) to keep vaccination records, and preventing affected persons from working unless vaccinated.
- Empowering authorised enforcement persons to order individuals to produce evidence of compliance with a specified COVID-19 measures.
- Empowers PCBUs to assess that workers are vaccinated and undergo medical examination or testing for COVID-19. The Governor-General at the discretion of the Prime Minister can also prescribe an assessment tool to help PCBUs facilitate this process.
- Allows for the storage and disclosure of personal information on the condition that it is used for ascertaining that a person has been vaccinated, issued with a COVID-19 vaccination certificate, or is complying with the COVID-19 Public Health Response Act, a health order, and the Health Act 1956.
- Recognises the My Vaccine Pass and International Travel Vaccination Certificate as COVID-19 vaccination certificates.

== History and responses ==
On 12 May 2020, Attorney General David Parker introduced the COVID-19 Public Health Response Act to provide the legal framework for the Government's efforts to combat COVID-19 and to replace the country's state of emergency. The bill passed its first two readings on 12 May and passed its third reading on 13 May by a margin of 63 to 57 votes. The COVID-19 Public Health Response Act was supported by the Labour-led coalition government (including the allied New Zealand First and Green parties) but was opposed by the opposition National Party. National Member of Parliament Gerry Brownlee claimed that the bill placed too much power in the hands of the Prime Minister without clarifying what advice she needed to make decisions. The ACT party's sole Member of Parliament David Seymour voted in favour of the bill during its first two readings but opposed it during its third reading because he believed that it did not "balance the rights, freedoms and overall welfare of New Zealanders with the Government's effort to control COVID-19."

The COVID-19 Public Health Response Act was criticised by Chief Human Rights Commissioner Paul Hunt, who described the lack of scrutiny and rushed process as "a great failure of our democratic process". Hunt also criticised the lack of provision within the legislation to ensure that those making decisions and implementing the new law would abide by national and international human rights as well as the Treaty of Waitangi. Opposition parties and civil liberties groups also expressed concerned that the bill empowered Police to enter premises without a warrant. In response to criticism, Parker claimed that the bill limited police search powers in comparison to the Health Act 1956 and the national state of emergency.

Musician and conspiracy theorist Billy Te Kahika's New Zealand Public Party has sought to repeal the COVID-19 Public Health Response Act. In late July 2020, the Public Party entered into an alliance with independent MP Jami-Lee Ross's Advance New Zealand party.

On 18 October 2022, COVID-19 Response Minister Chris Hipkins announced that the Government would scrap several of the Public Health Response Act's provisions including powers to implement lockdowns, managed isolation and quarantine (MIQ), border closures, vaccine passes and mandates. The Government however opted to retain the Act's provisions for seven-day isolation periods, mask use and border entry requirements until Parliament passed newer, general pandemic legislation.

On 26 November 2024, the COVID-19 Public Health Response Act 2020 was repealed by Parliament.
