= My Vaccine Pass =

Vaccine certificate in New Zealand

- Type: COVID-19 vaccine passport
- Issued by: New Zealand
- First issued: 3 December 2021
- Purpose: Proof of one's COVID-19 vaccination status
- Eligibility: New Zealand vaccine recipients
- Expiration: 1 June 2022
- Rights: Access to certain hospitality venues and gatherings

My Vaccine Pass was a vaccine certificate issued by the New Zealand Government that served as an official record of one's COVID-19 vaccination status during the COVID-19 pandemic. The vaccine pass was required to enter hospitality venues, community, sport and faith-based gatherings, as a result of the COVID-19 Protection Framework having come into effect on 3 December 2021. The passes expired on 1 June 2022.

== Description ==
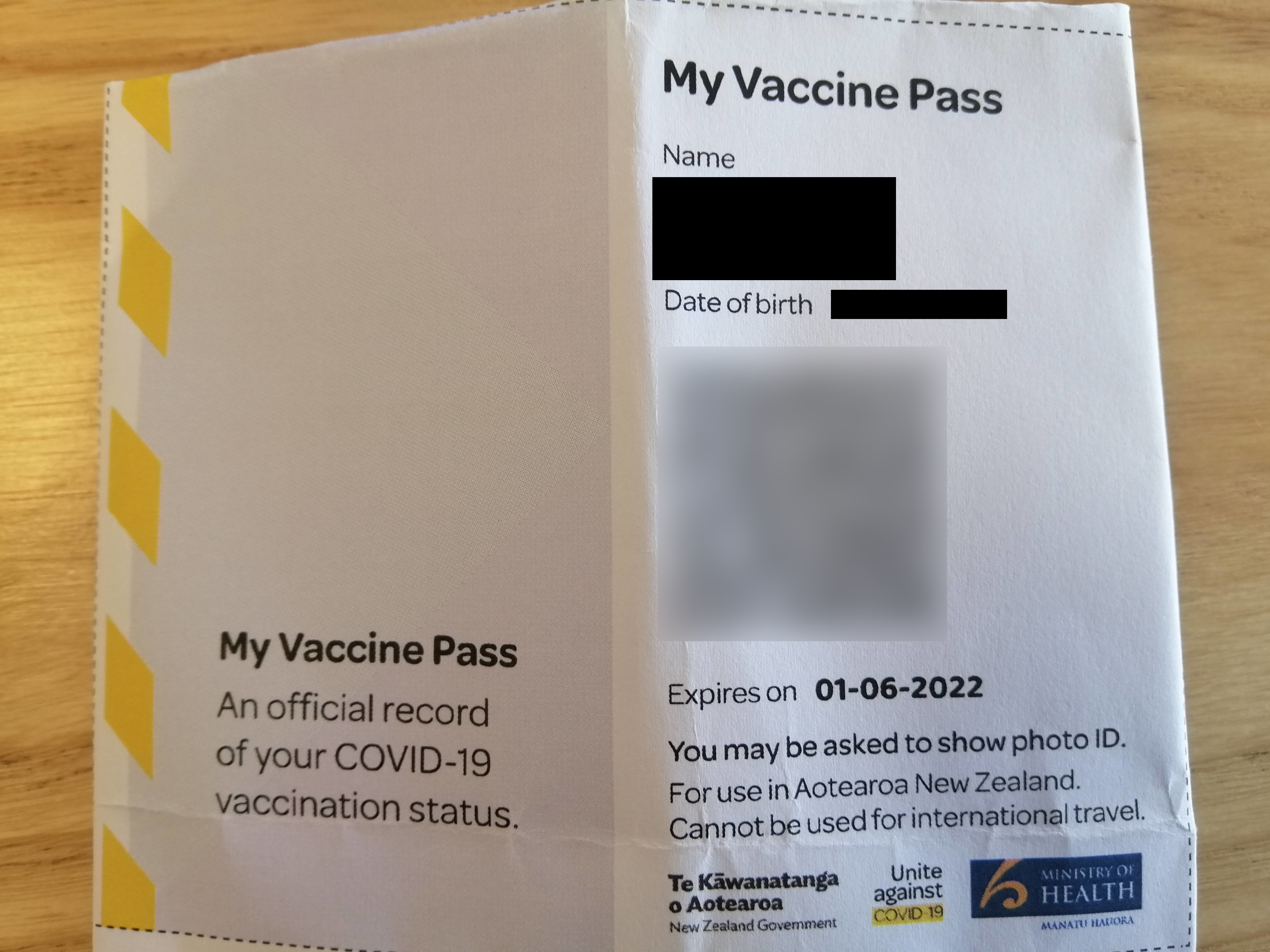
Paper version of My Vaccine Pass

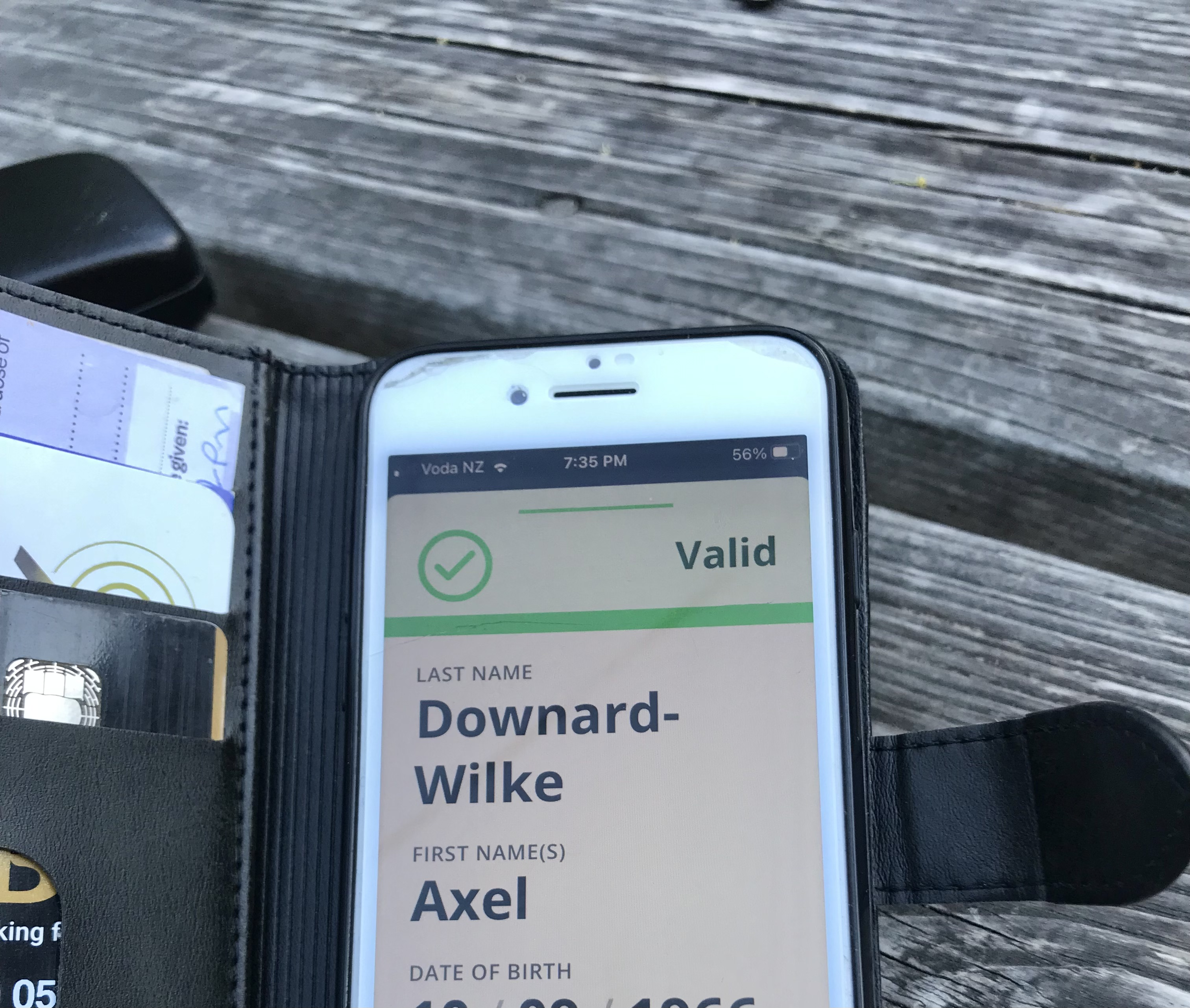
Vaccine Pass app

My Vaccine Pass is an official record of one's COVID-19 vaccination status in New Zealand. Anyone above the age of 12 who has received two COVID-19 vaccines in New Zealand or who has been given a medical exemption can request a "My Vaccine Pass" via the "My COVID Record" website. The pass contains the individual's name, date of birth and a QR code. This pass can be saved on a digital device such as a phone and can also be printed. Those lacking a smartphone or computer access can also request a My Vaccine Pass by a phone call. A printed version of the Pass can also be obtained in person for free at pharmacies that provide COVID-19 vaccinations.

The Ministry of Health contracted the tech company MATTR to develop New Zealand's domestic and international vaccine pass apps as well as the NZ Pass Verifier app. As part of the contract, MATTR has developed the NZ COVID Pass specification, which uses Elliptic-curve cryptography and CBOR Web Tokens to encode a person's credentials in a QR code and assert that the person is considered vaccinated. The specification allows for a creation of third-party verifier apps, which can use Decentralized identifier document that Ministry of Health publishes to verify pass signatures.

On 23 November 2021, Hipkins confirmed that once the My Vaccine Pass has been downloaded, an Internet connection is not required to operate it. However, the app's device should be regularly connected to the Internet to remain up to date.

The My Vaccine Pass is valid for six months from the date of issue since booster shots may be required and because medical exemptions are only valid for six months. If vaccination passes are still required after a pass has expired, users will need to request another one to prove that their vaccinations are current.

Under the Government's COVID-19 Protection Framework, the My Vaccine Pass is compulsory for entering a range of public settings including events, hospitality (cafes, restaurants and bars), close contact businesses such as hairdressers and beauticians, retailers, sporting events, and faith-based gatherings. However, the vaccine pass is not needed to access essential services such as supermarkets, pharmacies, health and disability services, food banks, petrol stations, public transportation, schools, housing and housing support services. Children under the age of 12 do not need to show proof of vaccination status. Certain businesses and event managers are required to check customers' My Vaccine Pass with the NZ Pass Verifier app.

=== Overseas travel ===
My Vaccine Pass cannot be used for international travel. People travelling overseas have to apply for a separate "International Travel Vaccine Certificate." People can request a travel vaccine certificate on the My COVID Record or via a phone call. The International Travel Vaccination Certificate complies with European Union Digital COVID Certificate standards and is valid for one year upon issue.

=== Overseas vaccination ===
Individuals who have been vaccinated overseas can apply to the Ministry of Health to have their overseas vaccination record added to New Zealand's COVID Immunisation Register (CIR) prior to applying for their My Vaccine Pass. The COVID Vaccination Technical Advisor Group recognises eight overseas vaccines for the My Vaccine Pass; namely the Pfizer–BioNTech, Janssen, Oxford–AstraZeneca (including Covishield), Moderna and Sinopharm BIBP vaccines and CoronaVac and Covaxin.

== History ==
The New Zealand Government rolled out the "My Vaccine Pass" on 17 November 2021 as part of its preparation to move New Zealand into the COVID-19 Protection Framework ("traffic light system").

The launch of the My Vaccine Pass was complicated by the "My COVID Record" website's cyber defence systems mistaking the large number of visitor requests for distributed denial of service (DDOS) attacks. As a result, customers initially faced delays in obtaining their vaccine certificates. In addition, New Zealand International Students Association national president Afiqah Ramizi expressed concerns that My Vaccine Pass system only accepted New Zealand and Australian identity documents, making it hard for foreign passport holders to obtain the vaccine certificates. Other international students also questioned health authorities' decision to only recognise eight vaccine types.

On 19 November 2021, seven businesses including gym chain Les Mills International announced that they would be trialling the new vaccine passes using the NZ Pass Verifier, which had been made available to them early. The Government plans to launch the NZ Pass Verifier app the following week for businesses and event holders.

By 3 December 2021, almost 70% of the 3.6 million fully vaccinated population in New Zealand (roughly 2.4 million) had downloaded their official vaccine passes.

On 23 March 2022, Prime Minister Jacinda Ardern announced that the Government would eliminate My Vaccine Pass requirements from 11:59 pm on 4 April 2022 as part of a series of changes to the "traffic light system." As part of the new policy, people would no longer have to be vaccinated in order to enter venues covered by the vaccine pass. Ardern indicated that the Government could also update vaccine passes in May or June 2022 to require three doses of the vaccine for those workplaces still requiring them.

== Issues and responses ==
=== Accessibility ===
Māori academic Dr Karaitiana Taiuru expressed concern that the My Vaccine Pass would be inaccessible to rural and elderly Māori communities that lacked Internet access or a smartphone. In addition, many lacked a landline which he claimed was needed for ordering a postal version.

In order to address the "digital divide" for individuals who have limited access to email or phone apps required to carry the pass, people can apply for vaccine passes at some pharmacies.

=== Fraud ===
On 17 December 2021, Stuff reported that some My Vaccine Pass users were having their vaccine passes stolen and sold on an online platform using cryptocurrencies such as Dogecoin. Stuff reported that this online platform had a backlog of requests and hundreds of subscribers. The platform also claim it would buy legitimate vaccine passes for NZ$75 and also recommended harvesting legitimate certificates from unwary users. This fraud was complicated by the lack of a legal requirement that the vaccine pass be checked against a form of photo identification.
