= NZ COVID Tracer =

New Zealand COVID-19 app

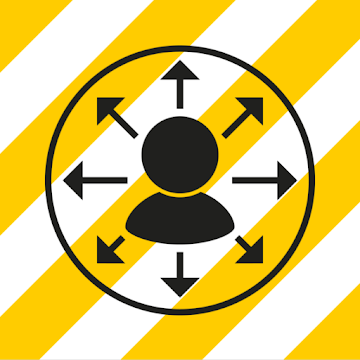

- Screenshot
- Developers: Ministry of Health; Rush Digital
- Release: 20 May 2020; 6 years ago
- Final release: 8.0.0 / 23 December 2022
- Operating system: Android, iOS
- Platform: Amazon Web Services
- Size: 50 MB (Android); 63.3 MB (iOS)
- Licence: AGPLv3
- Website: tracing.covid19.govt.nz

NZ COVID Tracer was a mobile software application that enabled a person to record places they have visited, in order to facilitate tracing who may have been in contact with a person infected with the COVID-19 virus. The app allowed users to scan official QR codes at the premises of businesses and other organisations they visited. It was launched by New Zealand's Ministry of Health on 20 May 2020, during the COVID-19 pandemic. It was available on App Store and Google Play.

== History ==
=== 2020 ===
The NZ COVID Tracer app was developed for the Ministry of Health by New Zealand company Rush Digital and relied on an Amazon Web Services backend. It was formally launched on 20 May 2020. Some people were able to download it from App Store on 19 May and a Health Ministry spokesperson said later that it had been submitted to App Store and Google Play that evening and that there can be a variation in time between submitting an app and it going live. Then–Prime Minister Jacinda Ardern described the NZ COVID Tracer app as a "digital diary". It worked on mobile devices using Android 7.0 or above, and Apple iOS 12 or above, with future updates to include support for older systems.

Immediately following its release, several users encountered difficulties with logging into the app or using it. There were also complaints from the public about iPhones and Android phones running the older, incompatible versions of operating systems being unable to download the app. The Ministry advised people without a compatible mobile device to keep a manual record of the people and places they have visited for contact tracing purposes. The app received an average rating of 2.6 on Google Play Store, with most complaints relating to its poor design and difficulty with finding the app. As of 20 May, more than 92,000 people had downloaded the app and over 1,000 businesses had signed up to it.

On 12 June, Stuff reported that many businesses were finding the app clunky to use and had to rely upon secondary apps. A poll conducted on Neighbourly found that less than 37% of respondents had downloaded the COVID Tracer app due to privacy concerns, lack of access to a smartphone, and confusion about how to use it. By 17 June, the Ministry of Health reported that 562,000 people had registered with the COVID Tracer app. 56,552 posters displaying the official QR codes had been created. As June 2020, there had been 1,035,154 poster scans.

The Ministry of Health released a new version of the app on 30 July 2020 that could be used on phones running Android 6 or iOS 11. Additionally, the update added the ability for users to manually enter location data for places they visit that do not have a QR code displayed.

It became compulsory for businesses to display the official QR codes at their doors or reception areas from noon 19 August. By 18 August, more than 234,000 QR posters had been generated but not all clinics and retirement villages had displayed them. From 11:59 pm on 3 September, it became compulsory for all public transport providers, including buses, trains, ferries, ride-share vehicles and train operators, to provide the QR codes for passengers to use.

On 23 November 2020, the Ministry of Health released an update to the app that would no longer require users to sign up for an account or set a password. Existing users will also no longer be required to periodically sign in. The dashboard user interface was also improved to make the layout and navigation simpler.

As of 25 November, there were 2,381,200 registered users.

On 10 December, the COVID Tracer app received an update that would allow contact tracing via Bluetooth. At the same time, the app's source code was released on GitHub.

=== 2021 ===
On 30 January, the Ministry of Health recommended that people with an Android 5 device use the similar Rippl app, as NZ COVID Tracer did not work on Android 5.

By 8 February 2021, the Health Minister reported that the COVID Tracer app had 2,559,151 users following a Government plea for New Zealanders to keep scanning over summer in order to avoid another outbreak. In addition, there were a total of 173,583,645 poster scans and users have created 7,100,714 manual diary entries.

On 22 August, the Government announced that record-keeping including scanning with the COVID Tracer app or manual signing will now be mandatory for most events and businesses at all alert levels in response to the detection of the Delta variant on 17 August 2021.

Following the delta outbreak in August 2021, it was noted that the Bluetooth tracking feature was being used sparsely by government contact tracers.

=== 2022 ===
On 23 March, Prime Minister Jacinda Ardern announced that people would not need to use their COVID Tracer apps to scan QR codes at businesses and venues from 11:59 pm on 4 April.

On 1 April, 1News reported a decline in NZ COVID Tracer app usage, citing data from the Ministry of Health. Between 1 December 2020 and 1 April 2022, COVID Tracer app usage declined from a peak of 1.5 million devices to below 200,000 on 1 April. However, devices using the associated Bluetooth tracing rose from below 400,000 in December 2020 to below 2.4 million by early April 2022.

=== 2023 ===
In August 2023, the NZ COVID Tracer app was removed from the Google Play Store and Apple App Store.

== Contact tracing ==
The NZ COVID Tracer app allowed users to scan official Ministry of Health QR codes at businesses, public buildings and other organisations to track where they have been, for contact tracing purposes. People can also register their contact tracing details on the official NZ COVID Tracer website. Information on people's movements will be stored for 60 days by the Ministry of Health securely on the user's device before being automatically deleted. Initially the period of retention for scan data was 31 days, however an update to the app on 9 September increased this to 60 days to make it easier for contact tracers to establish links between cases of COVID-19.

First-time users were required to enter their name, phone number, email address and create a password. They would then receive a six digit code that allows them to complete the registration process. The app also allowed users to store their contact details and physical address, which was provided to the National Close Contact Service (NCCS) in order to facilitate contact tracing in the event that the user was identified as a close contact of someone who has contracted COVID-19.

While the NZ COVID Tracer app is currently only available in English, the New Zealand Government intends to include support for the Māori, Chinese, and several unspecified Pacific languages.

On 10 June, the Government announced that it would be updating the NZ COVID Tracer app to allow the app to contact users who may have been exposed to COVID-19 and giving them the option of voluntarily sending their location history to public health officials.

On 10 December, the COVID Tracer app received a Bluetooth update that would create an anonymised record of every person the user has ever been near, bringing New Zealand in line with other countries such as Singapore which have been using Bluetooth contact tracing since March 2020. Using technology developed by Google and Apple, the Bluetooth upgrade also allowed the swapping of "randomised keys" with other phones carrying the updated COVID Tracer app.

== Privacy and oversight ==
The NZ COVID Tracer app was developed by the Ministry of Health in consultation with the Privacy Commissioner and has also undergone independent security testing. Any personal information and contact details registered on the Tracer app are provided to the National Close Contact Service. This information is retained for public health purposes only and is not shared with agencies outside the health sector. Any information entered through the Tracer app including the locations that users sign into is stored securely on the phone and automatically deleted after 60 days. Users have the right to share information with contact tracers.

== See also ==
- COVID-19 pandemic in New Zealand
- COVID-19 apps
