= Te Tai Tokerau =

- Single-member Māori constituency for the New Zealand House of Representatives
- Formation: 1996
- Region: Northland; Auckland
- Character: Urban and rural
- Term: 3 years

Member for Te Tai Tokerau
- TBD
- List MPs: Kelvin Davis (Labour); Hūhana Lyndon (Green)
- Previous MP: Kelvin Davis (Labour)
Party vote distribution

Te Tai Tokerau (lit. 'The North Coast') is a New Zealand parliamentary Māori electorate that was created out of the Northern Maori electorate ahead of the first Mixed Member Proportional (MMP) election in 1996. It was held first by Tau Henare representing New Zealand First for one term, and then Dover Samuels of the Labour Party for two terms. From 2005 to 2014, it was held by MP Hone Harawira. Initially a member of the Māori Party, Harawira resigned from both the party and then Parliament, causing the 2011 by-election. He was returned under the Mana Party banner in July 2011 and confirmed at the November 2011 general election. In the 2014 election, he was beaten by Labour's Kelvin Davis, ending the representation of the Mana Party in Parliament. Based on preliminary results, Aperahama Edwards of Te Pāti Māori has won the 2026 general election, but the result may change with the final vote count expected for 27 November.

== Population centres ==
Te Tai Tokerau's boundaries are similar to those of the pre-mixed member proportional (MMP) Northern Maori electorate. Te Tai Tokerau was created ahead of the first MMP election in 1996. In the 2002 boundary redistribution, the size of the electorate shrank to make room for an increase in the number of Māori electorates from six to seven. The boundaries were not further altered in the 2007 or 2013/14 redistributions.

Te Tai Tokerau is the northernmost Māori electorate, and covers an area between Cape Reinga in the Far North of the North Island to a boundary cutting through West Auckland. The major population centres are Whangārei, the Bay of Islands and north and west Auckland. The electorate contains all of the Ngāpuhi, Te Aupōuri, Ngāti Kuri, Te Rarawa and Ngāti Kahu tribal areas, and part of Ngāti Whātua's territory (rohe).

Its analogous general electorates are East Coast Bays, North Shore, Northcote, Northland, Rodney, Te Atatū, Upper Harbour, Whangārei, most of Helensville, part of Kelston and some of the islands located within Auckland Central.

== History ==
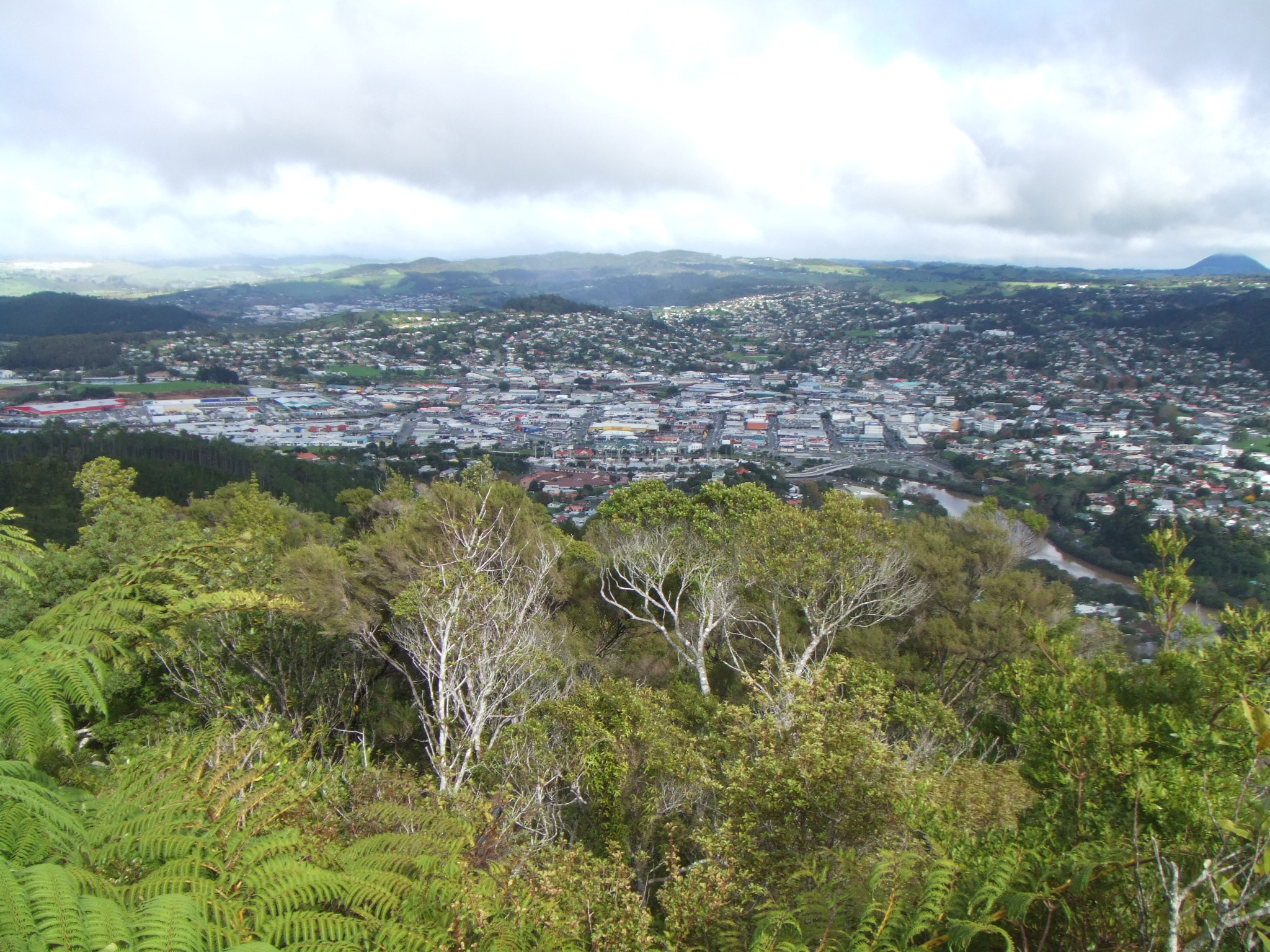
Whangārei

Northern Maori had been held by the Labour Party since the 1938 election, when longstanding Reform MP Taurekareka Henare was beaten by Labour's Paraire Karaka Paikea. In 1993, after 55 years of his party holding the seat, Labour MP Bruce Gregory was beaten by Henare's great-grandson, Tau Henare, standing for New Zealand First, ending Labour's unbroken hold on the four Māori seats. Henare went on to win Te Tai Tokerau after the switch to MMP, and New Zealand First won all five of the newly drawn Māori electorates.

After a tumultuous parliamentary term which saw all but one of the five New Zealand First Māori MPs defect to other parties, (including Henare himself, who went on to found Mauri Pacific), Labour won all six Māori electorates contested at the 1999 election. In Te Tai Tokerau, Tau Henare was beaten into third place behind the New Zealand First candidate and Dover Samuels, who Henare had beaten three years previous.

However, Labour's losing the five Māori electorates in 1996 showed that the Māori vote was contestable for the first time in five decades, as the new electoral system coupled with the rise of small parties meant that non-Labour candidacy in these seats was more feasible than under First Past the Post.

The New Zealand foreshore and seabed controversy of 2004–05 proved to be the catalyst for the second challenge to Labour party domination of the Māori electorates, this time from the Māori Party. At the 2005 election, Samuels and three other Labour Māori MPs lost their seats to Māori Party challengers. In Te Tai Tokerau, the winner was Hone Harawira.

Harawira resigned from the Māori Party in early 2011 and became an independent MP. On 11 May 2011, he resigned from Parliament effective 20 May, seeking a mandate for his new party, the Mana Party. This caused the 25 June 2011 by-election, which was contested by five parties, with the main contenders Harawira, Kelvin Davis (Labour Party) and Solomon Tipene (Māori Party). Harawira retained the electorate with a majority of 1,117, his previous majority being over 6,000. In the 2011 general election some months later, Harawira had a similar majority to Davis.

The Mana Party formed a coalition with the Internet Party just prior to the 2014 New Zealand general election. The coalition was registered with the Electoral Commission as the Internet Party and Mana Movement in July 2014, allowing it to contest the party vote. The Internet Party was founded by controversial online millionaire Kim Dotcom, and this strategic coalition resulted in Harawira's main opponent, Labour's Kelvin Davis, getting endorsements from Winston Peters of New Zealand First and the Prime Minister, John Key of the National Party. Even the electorate's candidate for the Māori Party, Te Hira Paenga, reminded voters of the importance of strategic voting. In his fourth challenge in the Te Tai Tokerau electorate, Davis ousted the incumbent Harawira, which ended the representation of the Mana Party in Parliament.

In the 2026 general election, Aperahama Edwards of Te Pāti Māori has won the electorate based on preliminary results, but The New Zealand Herald considers this as one of five electorates where the result may change with the final vote count expected for 27 November.

=== Members of Parliament ===
Key

NZ First Mauri Pacific Labour Māori Party Mana Independent

Election	Winner
1996 election	Tau Henare
1999 election	Dover Samuels
2002 election	Dover Samuels
2005 election	Hone Harawira
2008 election	Hone Harawira
2011 by-election	Hone Harawira
2011 election	Hone Harawira
2014 election	Kelvin Davis
2017 election	Kelvin Davis
2020 election	Kelvin Davis
2023 election	Mariameno Kapa-Kingi
2026 election	Aperahama Edwards (provisional)

=== List MPs ===
Members of Parliament elected from party lists in elections where that person also unsuccessfully contested Te Tai Tokerau. Unless otherwise stated, all MPs terms began and ended at general elections.

Election	Winner
1996 election	Joe Hawke
2005 election	Dover Samuels
2008 election	Kelvin Davis^{1}
2014	Kelvin Davis^{1}
2023 election	Kelvin Davis
2023 election	Hūhana Lyndon
2026 election	Hūhana Lyndon (provisional)
2026 election	Willow-Jean Prime

^{1}Kelvin Davis also contested the 2011 by-election, and re-entered Parliament on 23 May 2014 following Shane Jones' resignation.

== Election results ==
=== 2026 election ===
The next election will be held on 7 November 2026. Candidates for Te Tai Tokerau are listed at Candidates in the 2026 New Zealand general election by electorate § Te Tai Tokerau. Official results will be available after 27 November 2026.

=== 2023 election ===
2023 general election: Te Tai Tokerau
Notes:	Blue background denotes the winner of the electorate vote. Pink background denotes a candidate elected from their party list. Yellow background denotes an electorate win by a list member, or other incumbent. A ✓ or ✗ denotes status of any incumbent, win or lose respectively.						
Party	Candidate	Votes	%	±%	Party votes	%	±%
Te Pāti Māori	Mariameno Kapa-Kingi	10,428	37.55	+12.59	7,690	26.62	+16.44
Labour	✗ Kelvin Davis	9,911	35.69	−19.38	12,653	43.81	−16.25
Green	Hūhana Lyndon	4,187	15.08	—	2,731	9.46	+2.11
Legalise Cannabis	Maki Herbert	1,923	6.96	−0.90	468	1.62	−1.23
Independent	Paturiri Toautu	443	1.60	—			
NZ First					1,917	6.64	–0.46
National					1,545	5.35	+1.74
NZ Loyal					401	1.38	—
ACT					307	1.06	−0.25
Freedoms NZ					245	0.85	—
Opportunities					211	0.73	–0.27
NewZeal					161	0.56	−0.46 (Note: Compared to ONE Party)
DemocracyNZ					72	0.25	—
Animal Justice					28	0.10	—
Women's Rights					16	0.06	—
Leighton Baker Party					12	0.04	—
New Conservatives					10	0.03	−0.36
New Nation					6	0.02	—
Informal votes		880			410		
Total valid votes		27,772			28,883		
Te Pāti Māori gain from Labour	Majority	517	1.86				

=== 2020 election ===
2020 general election: Te Tai Tokerau
Notes:	Blue background denotes the winner of the electorate vote. Pink background denotes a candidate elected from their party list. Yellow background denotes an electorate win by a list member, or other incumbent. A ✓ or ✗ denotes status of any incumbent, win or lose respectively.						
Party	Candidate	Votes	%	±%	Party votes	%	±%
Labour	✓ Kelvin Davis	14,932	55.07	+2.47	16,692	60.06	+2.26
Māori Party	Mariameno Kapa-Kingi	6,768	24.96	—	2,828	10.18	3.72
Legalise Cannabis	Maki Herbert	2,131	7.86	+3.77	791	2.85	+1.77
Public	Billy Te Kahika	1,349	4.98	—			
ONE	Janice Arahanga-Epiha	433	1.60	—	284	1.02	—
New Conservative	Daniel Shortland	296	1.09	—	108	0.39	+0.33
Independent	Clinton Dearlove	265	0.98	—			
Independent	Moemoea Mohoawhenua	129	0.48	—			
Green					2,044	7.35	+1.32
NZ First					1,974	7.10	–4.00
National					1,002	3.61	–3.80
Advance NZ					771	2.77	—
ACT					363	1.31	+1.15
Opportunities					279	1.00	–1.31
Vision NZ					141	0.51	–
Outdoors					25	0.09	+0.04
Sustainable NZ					9	0.03	—
Heartland					3	0.01	—
Social Credit					3	0.01	–0.009
TEA					1	0.004	–
Informal votes		812			474		
Total valid votes		27,115			27,792		
Labour hold	Majority	8,164	30.11	+10.16			

=== 2017 election ===
2017 general election: Te Tai Tokerau
Notes:	Blue background denotes the winner of the electorate vote. Pink background denotes a candidate elected from their party list. Yellow background denotes an electorate win by a list member, or other incumbent. A ✓ or ✗ denotes status of any incumbent, win or lose respectively.						
Party	Candidate	Votes	%	±%	Party votes	%	±%
Labour	✓ Kelvin Davis	12,673	52.60	+8.70	14,446	57.80	+22.73
Mana	Hone Harawira	7,866	32.65	−7.88	1,455	5.82	−12.71
Green	Godfrey James Rudolph	1,958	8.13	-	1,583	6.33	−3.61
Legalise Cannabis	Maki Herbert	986	4.09	-	269	1.08	−0.02
NZ First					2,775	11.10	−3.29
National					1,851	7.41	−1.05
Māori Party					1,615	6.46	+5.19
Opportunities					577	2.31	-
ACT					41	0.16	0.00
People's Party					40	0.16	-
Ban 1080					21	0.08	0.00
Conservative					14	0.06	−0.62
Outdoors					12	0.05	-
Internet					5	0.02	−18.51
United Future					5	0.02	−0.14
Democrats					1	0.001	−0.049
Informal votes		610			223		
Total valid votes		24,093			24,933		
Labour hold	Majority	4,807	19.95	+16.58			

=== 2014 election ===
2014 general election: Te Tai Tokerau
Notes:	Blue background denotes the winner of the electorate vote. Pink background denotes a candidate elected from their party list. Yellow background denotes an electorate win by a list member, or other incumbent. A ✓ or ✗ denotes status of any incumbent, win or lose respectively.						
Party	Candidate	Votes	%	±%	Party votes	%	±%
Labour	Kelvin Davis	9,712	43.90	+6.80	8,034	35.07	+0.42
Mana	✗ Hone Harawira	8,969	40.53	−2.78			
Māori Party	Te Hira Paenga	2,579	11.65	−4.96	2,300	10.04	−1.12
Independent	Clinton Dearlove	454	2.05	+2.05			
Internet Mana					4,246	18.53	+18.53
NZ First					3,296	14.39	+4.53
Green					2,278	9.94	+1.33
National					1,938	8.46	−0.71
Legalise Cannabis					254	1.10	−1.88
Conservative					154	0.67	+0.15
Focus					45	0.20	+0.20
ACT					37	0.16	−0.07
United Future					18	0.08	−0.01
Ban 1080					19	0.08	+0.08
Independent Coalition					16	0.07	+0.07
Democrats					11	0.05	+0.04
Civilian					5	0.02	+0.02
Informal votes		418			257		
Total valid votes		22,132			22,908		
Labour gain from Mana	Majority	743	3.36	−2.85			

=== 2011 election ===
2011 general election: Te Tai Tokerau
Notes:	Blue background denotes the winner of the electorate vote. Pink background denotes a candidate elected from their party list. Yellow background denotes an electorate win by a list member, or other incumbent. A ✓ or ✗ denotes status of any incumbent, win or lose respectively.						
Party	Candidate	Votes	%	±%	Party votes	%	±%
Mana	✓ Hone Harawira	8,121	43.31	−18.64^{1}	4,844	24.49	+24.49
Labour	Kelvin Davis	6,956	37.10	+7.66	6,855	34.65	−10.98
Māori Party	Waihoroi Shortland	3,114	16.61	−45.35^{1}	2,208	11.16	−19.61
Legalise Cannabis	Maki Herbert	559	2.98	−1.08	229	1.16	+0.08
NZ First					1,950	9.86	+2.44
National					1,814	9.17	−0.17
Green					1,704	8.61	+5.10
Conservative					102	0.52	+0.52
ACT					46	0.23	−0.32
United Future					17	0.09	−0.03
Libertarianz					6	0.03	+0.01
Alliance					5	0.03	±0.00
Democrats					2	0.01	+0.01
Informal votes		912			473		
Total valid votes		18,750			19,782		
Mana hold	Majority	1,165	6.21	−26.30			

^{1}Swings against both Harawira (Mana Party) and Shortland (Māori Party) are calculated against Harawira's Māori Party vote in 2008

Electorate (as at 26 November 2011): 33,797

=== 2011 by-election ===
2011 Te Tai Tokerau by-election
Notes: Blue background denotes the winner of the by-election. Pink background denotes a candidate elected from their party list prior to the by-election. Yellow background denotes the winner of the by-election, who was a list MP prior to the by-election. A ✓ or ✗ denotes status of any incumbent, win or lose respectively.
Party	Candidate	Votes	%	±%
Mana Party	✓ Hone Harawira	6,065	49.28	
Labour	Kelvin Davis	4,948	40.20	
Māori Party	Solomon Tipene	1,087	8.83	
Legalise Cannabis	Maki Herbert	135	1.10	
OurNZ	Kelvyn Alp	72	0.59	
Informal votes		32		
Total Valid votes		12,307		
Mana Party gain from Māori Party	Majority	1,117	9.08	

=== 2008 election ===
2008 general election: Te Tai Tokerau
Notes:	Blue background denotes the winner of the electorate vote. Pink background denotes a candidate elected from their party list. Yellow background denotes an electorate win by a list member, or other incumbent. A ✓ or ✗ denotes status of any incumbent, win or lose respectively.						
Party	Candidate	Votes	%	±%	Party votes	%	±%
Māori Party	✓ Hone Harawira	12,019	61.95	+9.54	6,204	30.77	−0.27
Labour	Kelvin Davis	5,711	29.44	−3.97	9,200	45.63	−3.70
Legalise Cannabis	Judy Daniels	788	4.06	+1.05	218	1.08	+0.44
ACT	Peter Tashkoff	680	3.51		112	0.56	+0.31
Hapu Party	David Rankin	202	1.04				
National					1,883	9.34	−4.33
NZ First					1,495	7.41	−0.45
Green					709	3.52	−0.83
Family Party					108	0.54	
Progressive					74	0.37	−0.01
Bill and Ben					74	0.37	
Kiwi					32	0.16	
United Future					24	0.12	−0.29
RAM					10	0.05	
Pacific					6	0.03	
Alliance					5	0.02	−0.01
Libertarianz					5	0.02	±0
Workers Party					3	0.01	
Democrats					1	0.00	
RONZ					0	0.00	−0.03
Informal votes		530			292		
Total valid votes		19,400			20,163		
Māori Party hold	Majority	6,308	32.52	+13.52			

=== 2005 election ===
2005 general election: Te Tai Tokerau
Notes:	Blue background denotes the winner of the electorate vote. Pink background denotes a candidate elected from their party list. Yellow background denotes an electorate win by a list member, or other incumbent. A ✓ or ✗ denotes status of any incumbent, win or lose respectively.						
Party	Candidate	Votes	%	±%	Party votes	%	±%
Māori Party	Hone Harawira	9,965	52.41		6,151	31.00	
Labour	✗ Dover Samuels	6,352	33.41	−16.99	9,788	49.33	+2.10
Independent	Mere Mangu	1,250	6.57	−9.56			
Destiny	Ernest Morton	664	3.49		398	0.40	
Legalise Cannabis	Judy Daniels	574	3.01		126	0.64	−1.73
Independent	Hana Maxwell	207	1.09				
NZ First					1,559	7.86	−12.63
National					994	5.01	−0.85
Green					533	2.69	−8.67
United Future					81	0.41	−1.74
Progressive					71	0.36	−1.01
ACT					49	0.25	−1.18
99 MP					33	0.17	
Christian Heritage					18	0.09	−1.81
Family Rights					17	0.09	
Democrats					3	0.05	
Alliance					6	0.03	−3.64
RONZ					6	0.03	
One NZ					5	0.03	−0.01
Direct Democracy					1	0.02	
Libertarianz					3	0.02	
Informal votes		554			234		
Total valid votes		19,012			19,842		
Turnout		20,706	69.79	+11.13			
Māori Party gain from Labour	Majority	3,613	19.00				

=== 2002 election ===
2002 general election: Te Tai Tokerau
Notes:	Blue background denotes the winner of the electorate vote. Pink background denotes a candidate elected from their party list. Yellow background denotes an electorate win by a list member, or other incumbent. A ✓ or ✗ denotes status of any incumbent, win or lose respectively.						
Party	Candidate	Votes	%	±%	Party votes	%	±%
Labour	✓ Dover Samuels	7,868	50.40	+3.08	7,646	47.23	−4.36
Independent	Maryann Mangu	2,532	16.22				
Alliance	Rangimarie Naida Glavish	1,926	12.34	+5.25	594	3.67	−2.99
National	Mita Whare Harris	1,018	6.52	+1.98	674	4.16	−2.32
Independent	Michael John Smith	822	5.27				
Christian Heritage	Michael Norman	625	4.00	+1.96	308	1.90	
Progressive	Petera Kamira	428	2.74		222	1.37	
New Generation	Te Kaiarahi Hui	308	1.97				
Quality of Life	Ivan Erstich	83	0.53				
NZ First					3,318	20.49	+4.76
Green					1,839	11.36	+5.62
Mana Māori					531	3.28	
Legalise Cannabis					384	2.37	
United Future					348	2.15	
ACT					231	1.43	+0.48
ORNZ					81	0.50	
NMP					7	0.04	
One NZ					7	0.04	
Informal votes		484			189		
Total valid votes		15,610			16,190		
Turnout		16,562	58.66				
Labour hold	Majority	5,336	34.18				

=== 1999 election ===
1999 general election: Te Tai Tokerau
Notes:	Blue background denotes the winner of the electorate vote. Pink background denotes a candidate elected from their party list. Yellow background denotes an electorate win by a list member, or other incumbent. A ✓ or ✗ denotes status of any incumbent, win or lose respectively.						
Party	Candidate	Votes	%	±%	Party votes	%	±%
Labour	Dover Samuels	8,583	47.32		9,403	51.59	
NZ First	Anaru George	2,891	15.94		2,868	15.73	
Mauri Pacific	✗ Tau Henare	2,781	15.33		746		
Alliance	Ella Henry	1,286	7.09		1,214	6.66	
National	Tom Bowling Murray	824	4.54		1,182	6.48	
Christian Heritage	James Clendon Prime	370	2.04		282		
ACT	Nellie Rata	280	1.54		174	0.95	
Independent	Kingi Eruera Taurua	266	1.47				
Mana Wahine	Mere Rawiri-Tau	257	1.42				
Piri Wiri Tua	Te Kaiarahi Hui	207	1.14				
Independent	Dun Mihaka	187	1.03				
Independent	Marama Netana	104	0.57				
Freedom Movement	Atareta Kapa Hills	102	0.56		43		
Green					1,046	5.74	
Legalise Cannabis					553		
Mana Māori					494		
Christian Democrats					89		
Animals First					36		
One NZ					22		
NMP					17		
Libertarianz					16		
McGillicuddy Serious					16		
People's Choice Party					9		
United NZ					9	0.05	
Natural Law					5		
Republican					4		
South Island					0		
Total valid votes		18,138			18,228		
Labour gain from Mauri Pacific	Majority	5,692	31.38				

=== 1996 election ===
1996 general election: Te Tai Tokerau
Notes:	Blue background denotes the winner of the electorate vote. Pink background denotes a candidate elected from their party list. Yellow background denotes an electorate win by a list member, or other incumbent. A ✓ or ✗ denotes status of any incumbent, win or lose respectively.						
Party	Candidate	Votes	%	±%	Party votes	%	±%
NZ First	✓ Tau Henare	12,826	60.43		9,644	45.38	
Labour	Joe Hawke	4,408	20.77		6,176	29.06	
Alliance	Peter Campbell	1,468	6.92		1,818	8.55	
National	Rihari Dargaville	931	4.39		1,426	6.71	
Independent	Maryanne Baker	740	3.49				
Indigenous Peoples	Kingi Taurua	370	1.74				
Christian Coalition	Larry Sutherland	299	1.41		380	1.79	
McGillicuddy Serious	K. T. Julian	99	0.47		37	0.17	
Natural Law	Mary Austin	84	0.40		25	0.12	
Legalise Cannabis					735	3.46	
Mana Māori					592	2.79	
ACT					238	1.12	
Progressive Green					54	0.25	
Animals First					35	0.16	
Green Society					30	0.14	
Te Tawharau					22	0.10	
United NZ					19	0.09	
Advance New Zealand					6	0.03	
Superannuitants & Youth					6	0.03	
Conservatives					4	0.02	
Libertarianz					3	0.01	
Ethnic Minority Party					2	0.01	
Asia Pacific United					0	0.00	
Informal votes		262			235		
Total valid votes		21,225			21,252		
NZ First win new seat	Majority	8,418	39.66				
