= Electoral history of Chris Hipkins =

List of elections featuring Chris Hipkins as a candidate

This is a summary of the electoral history of Chris Hipkins, former Prime Minister of New Zealand, Leader of the Labour Party (2023–present), and Member of Parliament for Remutaka (2008–present).

== Parliamentary elections ==
=== 2008 election ===
2008 general election: Rimutaka
Notes:	Blue background denotes the winner of the electorate vote. Pink background denotes a candidate elected from their party list. Yellow background denotes an electorate win by a list member, or other incumbent. A ✓ or ✗ denotes status of any incumbent, win or lose respectively.						
Party	Candidate	Votes	%	±%	Party votes	%	±%
Labour	Chris Hipkins	13,735	39.27	-15.47	14,685	41.31	-6.49
National	Richard Whiteside	12,982	37.12	+6.63	14,452	40.65	+6.61
NZ First	Ron Mark	5,257	15.03	+11.82	1,453	4.09	-0.52
Green	Lynette Vigrass	1,755	5.02	+1.38	2,107	5.93	+1.76
United Future	Jenni Hurn	522	1.49	-3.72	499	1.40	-3.26
ACT	Nigel Kearney	453	1.30	+0.19	909	2.56	+1.36
Progressive	John Maurice	272	0.78	+0.78	345	0.97	-0.33
Māori Party					260	0.73	+0.21
Bill and Ben					255	0.72	+0.72
Kiwi					242	0.68	+0.68
Legalise Cannabis					122	0.34	-1.65
Family Party					85	0.24	+0.24
Pacific					57	0.16	+0.16
Alliance					28	0.08	-
Workers Party					18	0.05	+0.05
Libertarianz					13	0.04	-0.01
Democrats					8	0.02	+0.02
RONZ					7	0.02	+0.01
RAM					4	0.01	+0.01
Informal votes		297			126		
Total valid votes		34,976			35,549		
Labour hold	Majority	753	2.15				

=== 2011 election ===
2011 general election: Rimutaka
Notes:	Blue background denotes the winner of the electorate vote. Pink background denotes a candidate elected from their party list. Yellow background denotes an electorate win by a list member, or other incumbent. A ✓ or ✗ denotes status of any incumbent, win or lose respectively.						
Party	Candidate	Votes	%	±%	Party votes	%	±%
Labour	✓ Chris Hipkins	17,171	51.58	12.31	11,375	33.13	-8.18
National	Jonathan Fletcher	13,885	41.71	+4.60	15,364	44.75	+4.10
Green	Tane Woodley	1,990	5.98	+0.96	3,422	9.97	+4.04
ACT	Alwyn Courtenay	241	0.72	-0.57	235	0.68	-1.87
NZ First					2,148	6.26	+2.17
Conservative					955	2.78	+2.78
United Future					340	0.99	-0.41
Māori Party					190	0.55	-0.18
Legalise Cannabis					164	0.48	+0.13
Mana					80	0.23	+0.23
Libertarianz					28	0.08	+0.04
Alliance					20	0.06	-0.02
Democrats					12	0.03	+0.01
Informal votes		879			240		
Total valid votes		33,287			34,333		
Labour hold	Majority	3,286	9.87	+7.72			

Electorate (as at 26 November 2011): 44,403

=== 2014 election ===
2014 general election: Rimutaka
Notes:	Blue background denotes the winner of the electorate vote. Pink background denotes a candidate elected from their party list. Yellow background denotes an electorate win by a list member, or other incumbent. A ✓ or ✗ denotes status of any incumbent, win or lose respectively.						
Party	Candidate	Votes	%	±%	Party votes	%	±%
Labour	✓ Chris Hipkins	19,286	52.51	+2.25	12,176	32.73	−0.16
National	Lewis Holden	12,622	34.36	−6.27	15,352	41.28	−3.16
NZ First	Aaron Hunt	1,785	4.86	+4.86	3,806	10.23	+6.21
Green	Susanne Ruthven	1,727	4.70	−1.12	3,422	9.90	−1.41
Conservative	Philip Michael Lynch	973	2.65	+2.65	955	4.01	+1.25
Internet Mana					324	0.87	+0.64 (Note: 2014 Internet Mana swing is relative to the votes for Mana in 2011; it shared a party list with Internet in the 2014 election.)
Legalise Cannabis					194	0.52	+0.05
Māori Party					149	0.40	−0.15
ACT					126	0.34	−0.34
United Future					122	0.33	−0.66
Ban 1080					84	0.23	+0.23
Civilian					19	0.05	+0.05
Independent Coalition					19	0.05	+0.05
Democrats					14	0.04	+0.00
Focus					4	0.01	+0.01
Informal votes		241			159		
Total valid votes		36,393			37,194		
Labour hold	Majority	6,664	18.14	+8.52			

Electorate (as at 20 September 2014): 46,526

=== 2017 election ===
2017 general election: Rimutaka
Notes:	Blue background denotes the winner of the electorate vote. Pink background denotes a candidate elected from their party list. Yellow background denotes an electorate win by a list member, or other incumbent. A ✓ or ✗ denotes status of any incumbent, win or lose respectively.						
Party	Candidate	Votes	%	±%	Party votes	%	±%
Labour	✓ Chris Hipkins	21,725	55.48	+2.97	17,180	43.3	+10.57
National	Carolyn O'Fallon	13,116	33.49	-0.87	15,433	38.9	-2.38
Green	Stefan Grand-Meyer	1,815	4.63	-0.07	2,156	5.43	-4.47
NZ First	Talani Meikle	1,604	4.09	-0.77	2,938	7.40	-2.83
Conservative	Philip Lynch	356	0.91	-1.74	169	0.43	-3.58
ACT	Grae O'Sullivan	190	0.49	—	147	0.37	+0.03
Opportunities					1,095	2.76	—
Māori Party					181	0.46	+0.6
Legalise Cannabis					96	0.24	-0.28
Ban 1080					33	0.08	-0.15
United Future					32	0.08	-0.25
People's Party					22	0.06	—
Outdoors					16	0.04	—
Internet					12	0.03	-0.84 (Note: 2017 Internet Party swing is relative to the votes for Internet-Mana in 2014; it shared a party list with Mana Party in the 2014 election)
Democrats					10	0.03	-0.01
Mana					10	0.03	-0.84 (Note: 2017 Mana Party swing is relative to the votes for Internet-Mana in 2014; it shared a party list with the Internet Party in the 2014 election)
Informal votes		347			148		
Total valid votes		39,153			39,678		
Labour hold	Majority	8,609	21.99	+3.85			

=== 2020 election ===
2020 general election: Remutaka
Notes:	Blue background denotes the winner of the electorate vote. Pink background denotes a candidate elected from their party list. Yellow background denotes an electorate win by a list member, or other incumbent. A ✓ or ✗ denotes status of any incumbent, win or lose respectively.						
Party	Candidate	Votes	%	±%	Party votes	%	±%
Labour	✓ Chris Hipkins	29,217	68.57	+13.08	25,347	58.37	+15.07
National	Mark Crofskey	8,720	20.46	−13.04	8,274	19.05	−19.84
Green	Chris Norton	1,610	3.78	−0.86	3,105	7.15	+1.72
ACT	Grae O'Sullivan	952	2.23	+1.75	2,607	6.00	+5.63
NZ First	Talani Meikle	635	1.49	−2.61	1,296	2.98	−4.42
New Conservative	Hank Optland	618	1.45	+0.54	822	1.89	+1.47
ONE	Frank Eijgenraam	602	1.41	—	462	1.06	—
Advance NZ	Michael Alexander Stace	257	0.60	—	245	0.56	—
Opportunities					822	1.89	−0.87
Māori Party					171	0.39	−0.06
Legalise Cannabis					132	0.30	+0.06
Vision NZ					70	0.16	—
Outdoors					27	0.06	+0.02
Sustainable NZ					24	0.06	—
Social Credit					16	0.04	−0.00
TEA					6	0.01	—
Heartland					2	0.00	—
Informal votes		726			283		
Total valid votes		42,611			43,428		
Labour hold	Majority	20,497	48.10	+26.11			

=== 2023 election ===
2023 general election: Remutaka
Notes:	Blue background denotes the winner of the electorate vote. Pink background denotes a candidate elected from their party list. Yellow background denotes an electorate win by a list member, or other incumbent. A ✓ or ✗ denotes status of any incumbent, win or lose respectively.						
Party	Candidate	Votes	%	±%	Party votes	%	±%
Labour	✓ Chris Hipkins	22,344	53.58	-14.99	16,000	36.84	-21.53
National	Emma Chatterton	13,485	32.34	+11.88	12,726	29.30	+10.25
Green	Chris Norton	2,794	6.70	+2.92	5,068	11.66	+4.51
ACT	Michael Hurle	1,261	3.02	+0.79	2,476	5.70	+0.30
NewZeal	Tony Pitiroi	899	2.15	+0.74	500	1.15	+0.09
Vision New Zealand	Heker Robertson	409	0.98	—			
NZ First					2,441	5.62	+2.64
Opportunities					1,147	2.64	+0.75
Te Pāti Māori					511	1.17	+0.78
NZ Loyal					261	0.60	—
Legalise Cannabis					177	0.40	+.010
Freedoms NZ					147	0.33	—
Animal Justice					96	0.22	—
New Conservative					71	0.16	-1.73
DemocracyNZ					55	0.12	—
Women's Rights					35	0.08	—
Leighton Baker Party					13	0.02	—
New Nation					12	0.02	—
Informal votes		504			410		
Total valid votes		41,696			42,146		
Labour hold	Majority	8,859	21.24				

== Leadership elections ==
Hipkins was elected leader of the Labour Party unopposed on 21 January 2023 shortly after nominations closed.
