= Richard Sivell =

New Zealand criminal

Richard Trevor Sivell
- Born: 1982 or 1983 (age 43–44)
- Status: In prison
- Convictions: Threatening to kill, Obstruction
- Penalty: 11 months' imprisonment
- Time at large: 20 months, 15 days

Details
- Victims: Jacinda Ardern
- Span of crimes: 2021–2022
- Country: New Zealand
- Date apprehended: 9 January 2024

Richard Trevor Sivell is a New Zealand conspiracy theorist and "sovereign citizen" who was jailed for threatening to kill then-Prime Minister Jacinda Ardern in 2021 and 2022. He spent 20 months evading police before his 2024 trial and also failed to appear for sentencing on 7 January 2025.

In a separate matter he is defending charges of possessing an objectionable publication, namely the livestream that was broadcast during the 2019 Christchurch mosque shootings. In December 2024 he was told his next court date would be 5 March 2025.

== Threats to kill Jacinda Ardern ==
=== Arrest and disappearance, 2022 ===
Sivell made threats to kill Prime Minister Jacinda Ardern on Counterspin Media's Telegram channel in late 2021 and early 2022. Police received an anonymous tip-off from a listener and joined the channel using a fake identity to gather evidence. A number of audio and text messages from Sivell were used as evidence in the trial that followed.

Sivell was arrested on 29 March 2022. During the arrest, which Sivell resisted for a number of hours, he and his supporters posted audio and video clips to social media. He appeared in court the next month, refusing to recognise its jurisdiction and needing to be dragged to the dock. He was granted bail with conditions including not using internet-enabled devices or making any violent threats, and then failed to make his next scheduled appearance. A warrant for his arrest was duly issued.

While he was evading police, researchers from The Disinformation Project believed that Sivell was active in at least two Telegram channels. His messages talked about adding individuals including a District Court Judge to a "Nuremberg List" – a reference to executing war criminals. Researchers also believed that he had fallen out with a number of others in the conspiracy community, including Kelvyn Alp of Counterspin and Brian Tamaki.

=== Re-arrest and conviction, 2024–2025 ===
After more than 20 months on the run, Sivell was arrested on 9 January 2024. New charges were laid, relating to his missed court dates in April 2022. His trial began in October 2024 and in July 2025 Sivell was jailed for 11 months.

At trial on 2 October 2024, the court heard audio recordings, originally published on social media channels connected to Counterspin Media, in which Sivell said he had "a noose with [Ardern's] name on it", that he would be "quite happy to execute" her (and other politicians), and that he'd also be "quite happy to come down and construct some gallows". Other evidence included text messages in which he told his mother he wanted to "see Jacinda hang for crimes against humanity".

Sivell was convicted on three charges – threatening to kill, obstruction (relating to his 2022 arrest), and the bail-related charge which had been laid in 2024. He was due to have been sentenced on 7 January 2025 but told the court he couldn't travel to Tauranga. Since he failed to appear a warrant was issued for his arrest. In July 2025 he was sentenced to 11 months in prison at the Tauranga District Court.

== Possession of objectionable publication ==
On 15 March 2019 there was a mass shooting in Christchurch targeting Muslims. The murderer carried a camera throughout, livestreaming to social media. The resulting video of the shooting was quickly classified by David Shanks of the Office of Film and Literature Classification as "objectionable" under the Films, Videos, and Publications Classification Act 1993, making it a criminal offence to possess or distribute it.

Sivell has been charged with having and distributing a copy of the video. He appeared at Taupō District Court in August 2024 and refused to make a plea. The judge deemed his plea to be not guilty.

He next appeared on 30 October and requested a jury trial. (Between these appearances, Sivell was convicted in Tauranga on charges of threatening to kill.) Because Taupō doesn't hold jury trials the case was moved to Rotorua, where he failed to appear on 11 December 2024. An arrest warrant was duly issued and he attended court on 17 December.

Refusing the help of a duty lawyer, Sivell was told that his next appearance would be on 5 March 2025 and released on bail. The judge warned that any further breaches or failures to appear would lead to Sivell being held in custody.

== Self-representation and "sovereign citizen" arguments ==
Sivell has represented himself in court and used arguments drawn from the widely debunked sovereign citizen movement to deny that the court had jurisdiction over him. Judge Paul Geoghegan, in June 2024, and Judge Christopher Harding, that October, both dismissed Sivell's arguments as "gobbledegook". At his sentencing in July 2025, the judge said that documents filed by Sivell contained "pseudo legalise nonsense".

In his October 2024 trial for possessing the mosque shooting video, where Sivell again represented himself, he claimed a "right of subjugation" before being told by the Judge that "the right to subjugation does not exist in New Zealand when it comes to criminal law". When asked for his plea, Sivell said, "I require a sureties, bonds, denominations". He was cut off and taken to have pled not guilty. At his appearance on 17 December the court's duty lawyer informed the court that, "he’s a sovereign citizen...I’m an agent of the Crown, he was very pleasant but he doesn’t want any help.”

In another sovereign citizen-style assertion, Sivell invoked arcane law in claiming "allodial title" over a small public building near Te Puke.

== Involvement in New Zealand's conspiracy culture ==
In 2020 Sivell, who was working in Tīrau, received a warning from Police after distributing flyers that described South Waikato District Councillor Peter Schulte, who had fled East Germany in the 1980s, as a "Nazi". He also texted Schulte to say, "I'm coming for you Peter [...] watch the wrath of God fall upon you." Sivell's harassment of Schulte escalated from a dispute over whether the council was responsible for repairing potholes in a driveway.

He was a regular voice on Counterspin's Telegram channel, and commonly invoked the Nuremberg code in relation to politicians and law enforcement. He spread COVID-19 misinformation, 5G misinformation, and homophobia.

Sivell participated in the 2022 Wellington protest, which occurred the month before he was first arrest for making death threats.
