= Counterspin Media =

New Zealand alternative media platform

- Website type: Alternative media
- Available in: English
- Owners: Kelvyn Alp, Hannah Spierer
- Website: https://counterspinmedia.com [now defunct]
- Commercial: Yes
- Registration: Optional
- Launched: May 2021; 5 years ago
- Current status: Online

Counterspin Media is a far-right, anti-vaccine, and conspiracy theorist New Zealand online media platform that was founded in May 2021.

Counterspin Media has opposed the New Zealand Government's response to the COVID-19 pandemic including COVID-19 vaccination policies. In early 2022, the group played a leading role in the 2022 Wellington protest. Newsroom journalist Marc Daalder has described Counterspin Media as "one of the largest platforms for conspiracy theories and far-right ideology in New Zealand", while Stuff journalist Charlie Mitchell has described it as New Zealand's equivalent of the US website InfoWars.

In August 2022, Counterspin Media's founders, Kelvyn Alp and Hannah Spierer, were arrested and charged by the New Zealand Police for allegedly distributing objectionable material, shortly after Alp was banned from Instagram for encouraging violence. They were subsequently arraigned and brought to Christchurch Central Court, during which supporters gathered outside and Alp and Spierer refused to appear in the dock. They appeared at court again that December with no visible supporters outside.

== Content and coverage ==
Counterspin Media has described itself as an "apolitical platform" promoting individual rights and freedoms. They oppose so-called globalist influences and agendas. The platform also supports the New Federal State of China. Counterspin claims to focus on stories that the mainstream have allegedly ignored, fabricated, and misrepresented. It is listed on the New Zealand Companies Office's website as an Internet publishing and broadcasting company based in Auckland's Favona suburb.

Counterspin's hosts have included founder Kelvyn Alp, a far-right activist who advocated armed resistance against the New Zealand Government during the 2000s, and former Green Party activist Hannah Spierer. The two hosted the platform's twice weekly streams. Notable guests have included the New Zealand Doctors Speak Out With Science (NZDSOS), former TVNZ broadcaster Liz Gunn, and lawyer Sue Grey.

While Counterspin Media has been banned from most mainstream social media platforms, it maintains a strong following on its blog and on apps popular with conspiracy theorists. According to Stuff journalist Glenn McConnell, Counterspin is one of the most influential alternative media outlets. Their content has disputed the existence of the SARS-CoV-2 virus, accused the Government of controlling the mainstream media, and opposed COVID-19 vaccines on the grounds of alleged genocide and adverse reactions.

== History ==
Counterspin Media was established by far-right activist Kelvyn Alp as an Internet publishing and broadcasting company in May 2021. During its launch, the platform was hosted by GTV Media Group, an online television channel founded by former Counselor to the President Steve Bannon.

=== COVID-19 pandemic and Wellington protest ===
In September 2021, Counterspin Media promoted the activities of the Agricultural Action Group (AAG), which is led by former Advance New Zealand candidates Robert Wilson, Fred Roberts and Heather Meri Pennycook. The AAG has advocated climate change denial and conspiracy theories relating to COVID-19, vaccination, and the United Nations' Agenda 21. In early November 2021, Counterspin Media correspondent Shane Chafin disrupted a press conference by New Zealand Prime Minister Jacinda Ardern in the Northland Region, questioning the effectiveness of COVID-19 vaccines and accusing Ardern of lying to the public about the death of a vaccinated individual. In response, Ardern suspended the press conference.

Counterspin also participated in a large anti-vaccine mandate protest and occupation outside the New Zealand Parliament in February and early March 2022. While other protest groups including Brian Tamaki's The Freedoms & Rights Coalition (TFRC) wanted to focus on the repeal of vaccine mandates, COVID-19-related legislation and the reinstatement of anti-vaccination doctors, Counterspin viewed the protest as the start of war and called for the arrest of politicians advocating COVID-19 vaccination. Following a power struggle, Counterspin took control of the anti-vaccine occupation from the TFRC. Adopting a more confrontational stance, they urged protesters to resist Police attempts to evict them in early February 2022 and advocated storming Parliament to arrest MPs. Counterspin Media also used their platform to broadcast live-footage of the protest for 12 hours and shared their content through their Telegram account.

On 15 August 2022, Counterspin Media hosts Alp and Spierer featured in Stuff's Circuit documentary Fire and Fury, which examined various anti-vaccination and far right figures and groups involved in the 2022 Wellington protest. The documentary's producers including journalist Paula Penfold did not interview Alp and Spierer but instead used their videos, social media posts, and media coverage relating to their activities. In response, broadcaster Sean Plunket hosted Alp on his online radio station The Platform to share his side of the story in response to the documentary.

=== Let's Not Forget campaign ===
In early June 2022, Counterspin organised a national tour called "Let's Not Forget" which toured at least 21 towns and cities including Dunedin. During the tour, the group hosted talks promoting COVID-19 conspiracy theories, the Great Replacement, and the "common law" movement. The University of Otago's student magazine Critic Te Ārohi reported that two Dunedin venues including the South Dunedin Community Hall and First Church of Otago had declined the use of their premises to Counterspin speakers. Counterspin subsequently hosted at Henley Community Centre, which lay 32 km outside of South Dunedin.

=== 2022 local body elections ===
In June 2022, Counterspin Media filmed an event in Bluff featuring Voices for Freedom activists Jaspreet Boparai and Gill Booth, who ran as candidates for the Southland District Council and the Teviot Valley Community Board during the 2022 New Zealand local elections.

=== Kellie-Jay Keen-Minshull's New Zealand tour ===
Members of Counterspin Media attended controversial anti-transgender activist Kellie-Jay Keen-Minshull's Auckland speaking event on 25 March 2023, which was disrupted by rainbow counter-demonstrators. Following the Auckland event, Spierer confronted Green Party co-leader Marama Davidson, who had attended the event to support counter-demonstrators. During the altercation, Davidson stated that "I am a prevention violence minister, and I know who causes violence in the world. It is white cis men, that is white cis men who cause violence in the world". Davidson's remarks attracted significant domestic media attention as well as criticism from ACT Party leader David Seymour, National Party leader Christopher Luxon, and New Zealand First leader Winston Peters. Davidson had made the comment after she had been hit by a passing motorcyclist who was part of a support group from Pastor Brian Tamaki's Destiny Church.

== Legal problems ==
In late August 2022, Counterspin founder Alp and co-host Spierer were arrested in Christchurch on charges of distributing an objectionable publication, and for failing to allow Police to search their computer. The pair had allegedly distributed footage of the 2019 Christchurch mosque shootings. Alp and Spierer were subsequently bailed and ordered to appear at the Christchurch District Court on 30 August. During the hearing on 31 August, the pair refused to enter the dock and instead read prepared statements from the lawyer's bench. After ignoring Judge Large's repeated instructions to stand in the dock, Alp and Spierer were forcibly removed by security personnel and remanded on bail for three weeks. 60 protesters supporting Counterspin Media and a smaller group of counter-demonstrators demonstrated outside the Christchurch District Court. The pair subsequently reappeared at the Christchurch District Court in December 2022.

Separately, in October 2024, the Tauranga District Court found Richard Sivell guilty of threatening to kill Jacinda Ardern, who was Prime Minister when Sivell's incriminating comments were published on Counterspin's social media channels in 2020 and 2021. Audio recordings from Counterspin were used as evidence in the trial. Researchers from The Disinformation Project believed that Sivell had fallen out with Kelvyn Alp in 2023.
