= Hūhana Lyndon =

New Zealand politician

Hūhana Lyndon MP
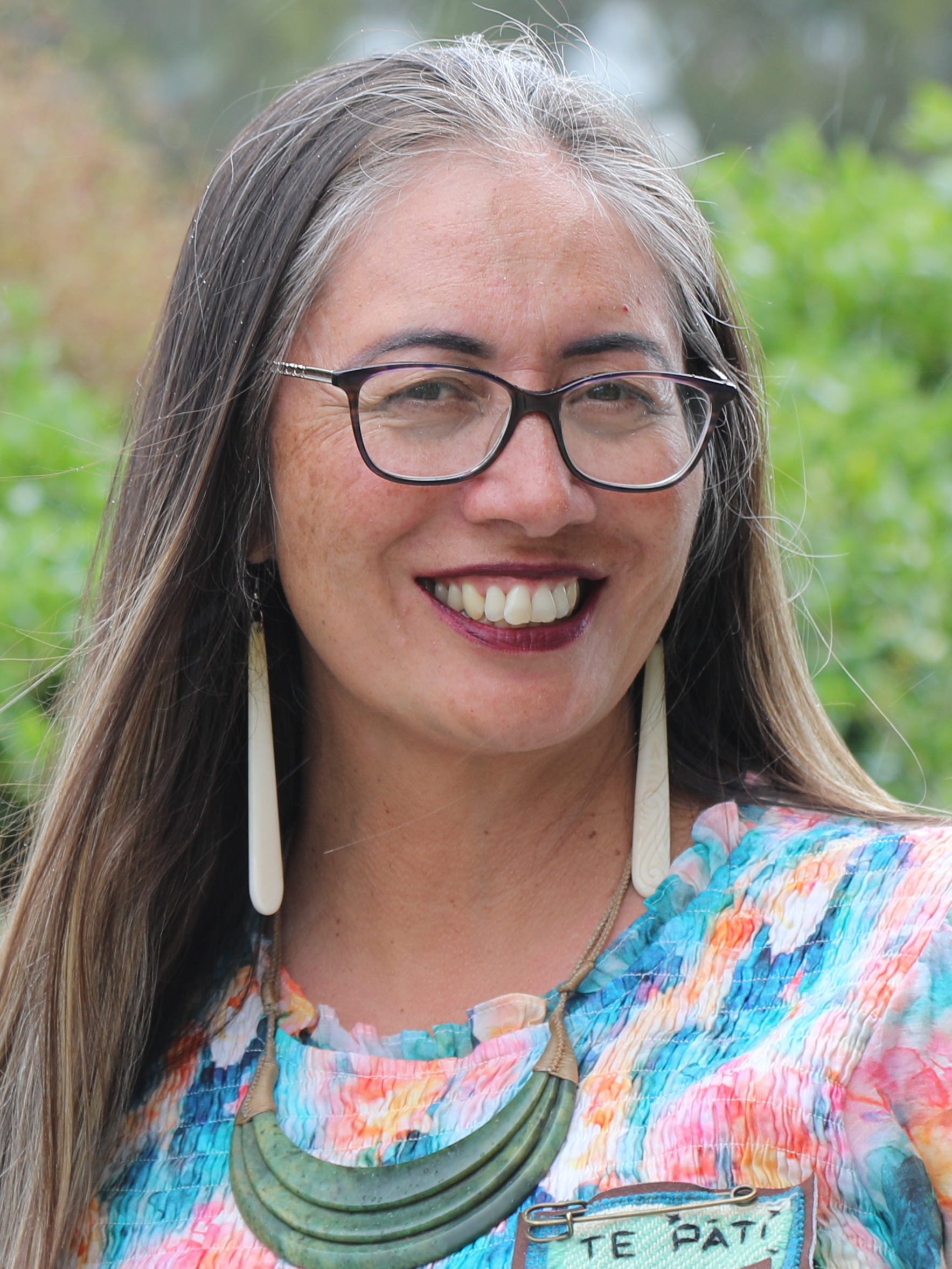
- Lyndon in February 2026

Member of the New Zealand Parliament for Green party list
- Incumbent
- Assumed office 14 October 2023

Personal details
- Born: 1978 or 1979 (age 47–48)
- Party: Green
- Lyndon's voice recorded July 2024

Hūhana Melanie Lyndon MP (born 1978 or 1979) is a New Zealand politician. She has served as a Member of Parliament for the Green Party of Aotearoa New Zealand since 2023.

== Early life and career ==
Lyndon is the daughter of Pierre Lyndon and Lisa Davies. She is descended from the iwi Ngātiwai, Ngāti Hine, Ngāti Whātua, Waikato Tainui, and Hauraki. She was raised in the Pīpīwai valley, west of Whangārei. She graduated from Victoria University of Wellington with a BA, the University of Auckland with a Postgraduate Diploma in Education, and Massey University with a Master of Business Administration. She has three children, all daughters.

She was chief executive of the Ngāti Hine Forestry Trust from 2019 to 2021. In 2021, she became CEO of the Ngātiwai Trust Board.

== Political career ==
In 2017, Lyndon stood as a candidate in Denby Ward at a by-election for Whangarei District Council. She polled in fifth place.

New Zealand Parliament
Years	Term	Electorate	List	Party
2023–2026	54th	List	10	Green
2026–present	55th	List	7	Green

Lyndon was a Green Party candidate in the 2023 general election, contesting the Te Tai Tokerau Māori electorate. She polled in third place with 4,187 votes and was elected to Parliament on the Green party list.

In late November 2023, Lyndon assumed the Green Party's health, Whānau Ora, Māori Development and forestry spokesperson portfolios.

At the 2026 New Zealand general election, Lyndon stood in the Te Tai Tokerau electorate for the Greens. She was ranked seventh place on the party list. On 7 November, Lyndon came second place in the Te Tai Tokerau contest, gaining 8,048 votes based on preliminary results. Due to her high ranking on the Green Party list, she was re-elected to Parliament as a list MP.
