= 2011 Te Tai Tokerau by-election =

New Zealand by-election

- 25 June 2011
- Turnout: 13,594
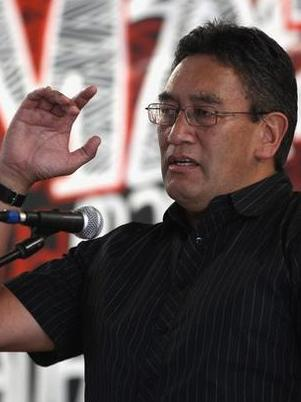

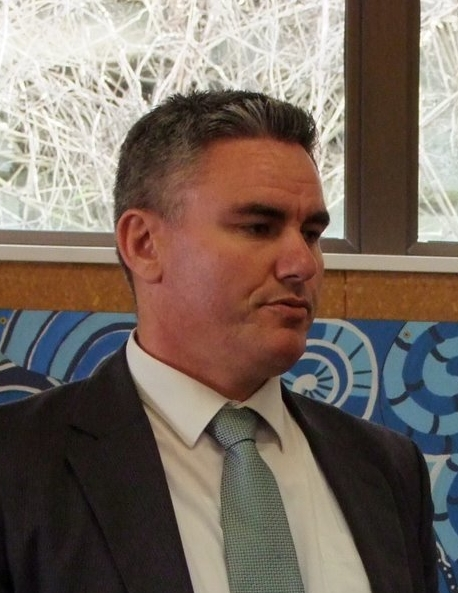
			ma‾-o•ri
Candidate	Hone Harawira	Kelvin Davis	Solomon Tipene
Party	Mana	Labour	Māori Party
Popular vote	6,065	4,948	1,087
Percentage	49.28	40.20	8.83
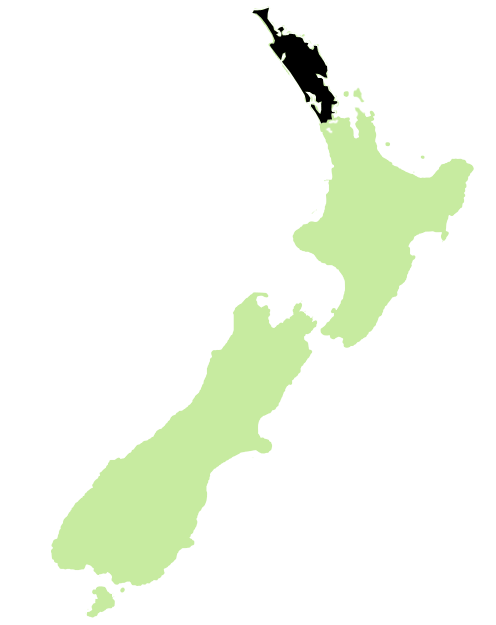
MP before election
Hone Harawira
Independent
Elected MP
Hone Harawira
Mana

The 2011 Te Tai Tokerau by-election was a by-election in the New Zealand electorate of Te Tai Tokerau that was caused by Hone Harawira's resignation from the seat. Prior to resigning his seat, Harawira had resigned from the Māori Party and formed his own Mana Party.

In May 2011 Harawira resigned from parliament, and a by-election was announced for 25 June. Harawira held his seat in the election, and won it again five months later in the 2011 general election. Harawira's decision to force a by-election so close to the general election incited criticism.

== Background ==
On 23 February 2011, following an ongoing rift with fellow members of the Māori Party, Hone Harawira resigned from the party after the party's disciplinary committee recommended his expulsion. Harawira announced his new Mana Party on 30 April 2011, also stating that he intended to resign from parliament to force a by-election before the coming 2011 general election.

After generating several days of media interest and criticism, Harawira announced on 4 May 2011 that he was delaying his resignation in order to consult his supporters in his electorate. On 11 May 2011 Harawira wrote to the Speaker of the House resigning from parliament, with effect from 20 May 2011. On 12 May 2011 the prime minister, John Key, announced that the by-election would be held on 25 June.

=== Reception ===
Many politicians and political commentators criticised the by-election because it would occur so close to the general election. Under New Zealand law, a by-election will not be held if there will be a general election within the next six months and 75% of MPs agree not to hold the by-election. So if Harawira had resigned later than 26 May then the by-election may not have occurred.

Harawira defended the by-election, which cost an estimated $500,000, saying "It's hardly an expense in terms of democracy".

==== Comparison to previous by-elections ====
The New Zealand political blogging community viewed some aspects of the by-election as being very similar to the 1993 Tauranga by-election. That by-election was held on 17 April and the subsequent general election on 7 November, after Winston Peters resigned first from the National Party, following disagreements with its leadership, and then as an MP in order to seek a "fresh mandate" for his views. The Tauranga by-election was labelled by media and opposing parties as a 'Publicity stunt', as was this by-election.

Claire Trevett of The New Zealand Herald saw Harawira's resignation to force the election as "a direct echo" of Tariana Turia's resignation to force the 2004 Te Tai Hauauru by-election. However, Turia resigned 14 months before the 2005 New Zealand general election, and the by-election took place at a time when the election date had not been set. Harawira's by-election took place within six months of a general election.

== Candidates ==
Five candidates stood in the by-election. Replacing Hone Harawira, who had left to stand for the Mana Party, the Māori Party selected Solomon Tipene as its candidate, choosing him over Waihoroi Shortland and Mere Mangu, who were also considered for the nomination.

Kelvin Davis stood for the Labour Party. He had contested the seat for Labour since 2008, and Davis would eventually beat Harawira for the seat in 2014.

Kelvyn Alp contested the by-election for the OurNZ Party and Maki Herbert stood for the Aotearoa Legalise Cannabis Party.

== Results ==
Counting commenced at 7:00pm on election day, with preliminary results due by 10:00pm. Official results were declared on Wednesday 6 July 2011. With 32,855 people enrolled to vote, turnout was 37.56%.

2011 Te Tai Tokerau by-election
Notes: Blue background denotes the winner of the by-election. Pink background denotes a candidate elected from their party list prior to the by-election. Yellow background denotes the winner of the by-election, who was a list MP prior to the by-election. A ✓ or ✗ denotes status of any incumbent, win or lose respectively.
Party	Candidate	Votes	%	±%
Mana Party	✓ Hone Harawira	6,065	49.28	
Labour	Kelvin Davis	4,948	40.20	
Māori Party	Solomon Tipene	1,087	8.83	
Legalise Cannabis	Maki Herbert	135	1.10	
OurNZ	Kelvyn Alp	72	0.59	
Informal votes		32		
Total Valid votes		12,307		
Mana Party gain from Māori Party	Majority	1,117	9.08	
