= Dover Samuels =

New Zealand politician

The Honourable Dover Samuels KSO
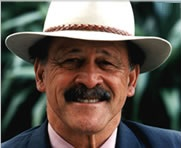

39th Minister of Māori Affairs
- In office 10 December 1999 – 28 June 2000
- Prime Minister: Helen Clark
- Preceded by: Tau Henare
- Succeeded by: Parekura Horomia

Member of the New Zealand Parliament for Labour Party list
- In office 12 October 1996 – 27 November 1999; 17 September 2005 – 8 November 2008

Member of the New Zealand Parliament for Te Tai Tokerau
- In office 27 November 1999 – 17 September 2005
- Preceded by: Tau Henare
- Succeeded by: Hone Harawira

Personal details
- Born: 9 July 1939 (age 87)
- Party: Labour
- Other political affiliations: New Democratic (1972)

Dover Spencer Peneha Samuels KSO (born 9 July 1939) is a former Labour member of Parliament in New Zealand from 1996 to 2008.

== Biography ==
=== Early political career ===
Samuels started his political career in the 1970s as a councillor for the Whangaroa County Council. He stood in the Northern Maori electorate for the New Democratic Party at the 1972 general election. He placed fourth out of five candidates with 1.82% of the votes. He went on to become a councillor and deputy mayor for the Far North District Council.

Samuels joined the Labour Party and became its Māori senior vice president. In 1994 he challenged Maryan Street for the Labour Party presidency, but lost by a wide margin, 303 votes to Street and 75 for Samuels.

He was awarded the New Zealand 1990 Commemoration Medal for services to New Zealand.

=== Member of Parliament ===
New Zealand Parliament
Years	Term	Electorate	List	Party
1996–1999	45th	List	3	Labour
1999–2002	46th	Te Tai Tokerau	5	Labour
2002–2005	47th	Te Tai Tokerau	11	Labour
2005–2008	48th	List	10	Labour

He first entered Parliament as a list MP in the 1996 election, and was the MP for Te Tai Tokerau since the 1999 election. When the Labour Party formed a government following its victory in 1999, Samuels became the Minister of Māori Affairs, but resigned this role in June 2000 pending an investigation into alleged sex crimes committed before he entered politics. The police later cleared Samuels of all charges, and Samuels alleged that the accusations had political motivations. He was reinstated as a Minister of State in 2002, but in 2005 was involved in further controversy following a late-night incident in which he publicly urinated in a hallway within Auckland's Heritage hotel.

Samuels lost his Māori electorate of Te Tai Tokerau in 2005 to the Māori Party candidate Hone Harawira. However, he was returned to parliament due to his high position on the Labour Party list. He was made the Associate Minister for Economic Development, Housing, Tourism and Industry and Regional Development.

On 31 October 2007, during the Cabinet reshuffle, Samuels lost his position as a Minister outside Cabinet and was replaced by Darren Hughes. He returned to the backbench.

Samuels did not contest the 2008 election.

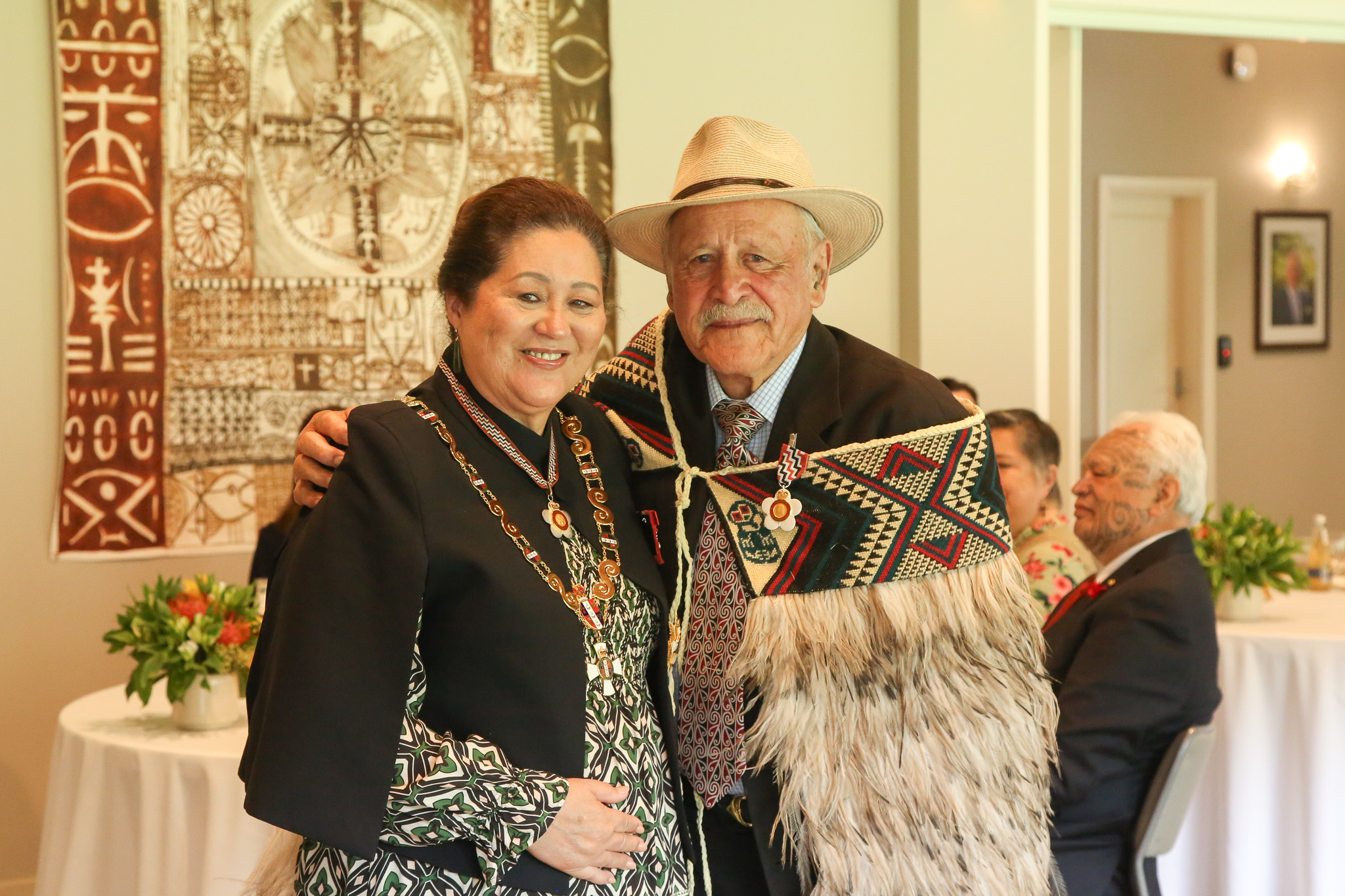
Samuels (right), after his investiture as a Companion of the King's Service Order by the governor-general, Dame Cindy Kiro, at Government House, Auckland, on 1 October 2025

In the 2025 King’s Birthday Honours, Samuels was appointed a Companion of the King's Service Order, for services as a Member of Parliament.

=== Personal life ===
He is an active member of the Rātana Church of New Zealand and has iwi Affiliations with Ngāpuhi and Ngāti Kurī.

New Zealand Parliament
Preceded by Tau Henare	Member of Parliament for Te Tai Tokerau; 1999–2005	Succeeded by Hone Harawira
Political offices
Preceded by Tau Henare	Minister of Māori Affairs; 1999–2000	Succeeded by Parekura Horomia
