= Hannah Spierer =

New Zealand conspiracy activist

Hannah Spierer, also known as Sarah Smith, (born circa 1985) is a host and co-founder of the far right alternative media platform Counterspin Media. She is the partner of fellow Counterspin host and co-founder Kelvyn Alp. During the 2000s, Spierer studied political science at the University of Auckland, holding positions in the Auckland University Students Association's and the Green Party's campus branch. By the early 2020s, Spierer's politics had shifted to the right and she became involved with QAnon, the sovereign citizen movement, the anti-lockdown group "Mothers Who Stand for Freedom" and Counterspin Media.

== Education and work ==
Hannah Spierer studied political science at the University of Auckland. In 2006, she became the Auckland University Students Association's (AUSA) international affairs officer. In 2007, she served as the AUSA's environmental affairs officer and became the Green Party's co-convenor at the university. In June 2007, Spierer co-signed a letter criticising Ian Wishart's Investigate magazine alleging that radical preachers had infiltrated New Zealand's Muslim community.

By 2019, Spierer had adopted the identity of "Sarah Smith" and was working as an assistant at Rudolf Steiner Kindergarten, a special character school that practiced anthroposophy, a so-called "spiritual science" revolving around child education.

== Activism and views ==
Spierer has described herself as a "former leftie" who had wanted to join the feminist movement. By the 2020s, she had rejected her former feminist views, alleging that feminism was making men and young boys "less like alpha males and more like women." By the time of the COVID-19 pandemic in 2020, Spierer had embraced QAnon, anti-COVID lockdown and sovereign citizen views. Spierer also became involved in the anti-lockdown group "Mothers Who Stand For Freedom" (MWSFF), which supported the anti-vaccination group Voices for Freedom. As a member of the MWSFF, Spierer has opposed transgenderism, promoted QAnon arguments about child sex trafficking rings and the Satanic ritual abuse conspiracy. In October 2020, Spierer released a YouTube series criticising feminism.

=== Counterspin Media ===
In 2021, Spierer and her partner Kelvyn Alp co-founded and launched the alternative media platform Counterspin Media. Spierer served as co-host with the couple covering various topics including the Apollo moon landings, COVID-19 and the Christchurch mosque shootings. Spierer also criticised feminism in her Counterspin Media podcasts, alleging that it conditioned women to neglect raising children in favour of pursuing careers. As co-hosts of Counterspin Media, Spierer and Alp participated in the 2022 Wellington protests, where anti-lockdown and anti-vaccination protesters occupied the grounds of Parliament for 23 days. During the Parliament occupation, Spierer advocated that women play a subservient role in the alt-right movement. During a Counterspin Media tour in Bluff, Spierer attributed White guilt and systemic racism to Marxism.

In mid-August 2022, Spierer and Alp featured in Stuff's Circuit documentary Fire and Fury, which examined various anti-vaccination and far right figures and groups involved in the 2022 Wellington protest including Counterspin Media. The documentary's producers including journalist Paula Penfold did not interview Spierer and Alp but instead used their videos, social media posts, and media coverage relating to their activities.

Following anti-transgender activist Kellie-Jay Keen-Minshull's Auckland speaking event on 25 March 2023, Spierer confronted Green Party co-leader Marama Davidson, who had attended the event to support counter-demonstrators, who disrupted Keen-Minshull's speech. During the altercation, Davidson stated that "I am a prevention violence minister, and I know who causes violence in the world. It is white cis men, that is white cis men who cause violence in the world". Davidson's remarks attracted significant domestic media attention as well as criticism from ACT Party leader David Seymour, National Party leader Christopher Luxon, and New Zealand First leader Winston Peters. Davidson had made the comment after she had been hit by a passing motorcyclist who was part of a support group from Brian Tamaki's Destiny Church.

== Legal troubles ==
=== Christchurch mosque shooting livestream dissemination ===
On 31 August 2022, Spierer and her partner Alp appeared in the Christchurch District Court, on charges of distributing objectionable material in violation of the Films, Videos and Publications Classification (FVPC) Act 1993. Spierer was charged with one count of distributing an objectionable publication, one charge of failing to carry out obligations in relation to a computer search and obstructing police. The couple had allegedly distributed a documentary deemened an objectionable publication under the FVPC Act 1993 on 23 February in 2022, which received a two-year ban. The two refused to enter the dock and read statements disputing the court's authority. They were forcibly moved into the dock by court security and police. Supporters of the couple and "anti-fascist" counter-protesters also gathered outside the courtroom.

In early December 2022, Spierer and Alp reappeared at the Christchurch District Court and were remanded on bail to reappear on 20 February 2023. In late October 2023, Justice Bruce Davidson confirmed that Spierer and Alp's objectionable publication case had been transferred from Christchurch to the Wellington District Court for the defendants' convenience. A pre-trial date of 14 February 2024 was set, with the objectionable publication revealed to be a so-called documentary containing livestream footage of the Christchurch mosque shootings; which had been banned by the Classification Office in the days after the shootings.

On 14 February 2024, Spierer and Alp attended pre-trial arguments in the objectionable publication case at the Wellington District Court. Davidson issued an interim order suppressing the defence and Crown counsels' arguments. In mid-July 2024, Spierer and Alp's lawyer Tim Leighton challenged the Crown's use of 14,000 terabytes of data extracted from dozens of devices seized by Police from the defendants. The couple's counsel argued that they were journalists and had a right to protect their sources. Leighton argued that the Crown's digital evidence was inadmissible due to issues around privacy privileges and data restructuring. The Wellington High Court justice has reserved their decision.

=== 2021 unlawful travel ===
During a COVID-19 lockdown on 22 October 2021, Spierer and Alp were arrested after travelling from Auckland (which was under an Alert Level 3 lockdown) to Wellington to support anti-vaccination activist Sue Grey during a hearing at the Wellington High Court. Alp was arrested by Police for travelling without applying for a travel exemption. In late May 2024, Alp's case against the Police for wrongful arrest was dismissed by Justice Kevin Kelly of the Wellington District Court.

== Personal life ==
Spierer is the partner of Alp, the co-founder of Counterspin Media. The couple have two children.
