= Internet Party (New Zealand) =

Political party in New Zealand

- Leader: Vacant
- President: Suzie Dawson
- Founder: Kim Dotcom
- Founded: 13 May 2014
- Ideology: Collaborative e-democracy Internet freedom Privacy; Copyright reform
- Political position: Syncretic
- Colours: Purple
- MPs in the House of Representatives: 0 / 120

The Internet Party was a registered political party in New Zealand that promoted Internet freedom and privacy. The party was founded in January 2014 with the financial support and promotion of internet entrepreneur Kim Dotcom, and was first led by former Alliance MP Laila Harré, then by citizen journalist Suzie Dawson.

The party contested the 2014 New Zealand election as part of an electoral alliance with the Mana Movement. It also contested the 2017 general election, independent of Mana. In both cases it did not win any seats in the New Zealand House of Representatives. The party was deregistered by the New Zealand Electoral Commission in June 2018 after its membership dropped below the 500 required for registration.

The party has not contested local or general elections since the 2017 general election. The party applied for broadcasting funding for the 2020 general election, but did not contest the election.

== History ==
Kim Dotcom founded the file-sharing website Megaupload in 2005. It was shut down in January 2012 by the US government and Dotcom was arrested by the New Zealand Police. In September 2013, Dotcom revealed an interest in setting up a political party and on 15 January 2014, Dotcom announced the creation of the Internet Party, including its name and logo. He intended to hold a launch party on 20 January, two years after the raid on his house and the day before his 40th birthday. He distributed 25,000 tickets but was forced to cancel for fear of breaching electoral law.

The Internet Party started to sign up members on 27 March 2014, and was the first New Zealand party to do so through the use of a phone app. It became a registered political party on 13 May 2014. Dotcom provided NZ$3.5 million in funding to the party, which was the largest personal contribution to a political party on record in New Zealand. To select its first leader, the party ran an Idol-style candidate search and appointed Laila Harré, a former Alliance MP and cabinet minister.

=== 2014 election ===
In May 2014, Internet Party chief executive Vikram Kumar and Mana Movement leader Hone Harawira announced a merger of the two parties, to be known as the Internet Party and Mana Movement, or the abbreviated Internet Mana. The party and its logo were registered with the New Zealand Electoral Commission on 24 July 2014, allowing the coalition party to contest the party vote. The Internet Party and Mana Movement contested the 2014 general election as a single entity. Mana already held an electoral seat in Parliament – Harawira held the Māori electorate of Te Tai Tokerau – and expected to retain this seat. Under New Zealand's electoral rules, a party without an electoral seat needed 5% of the party vote to enter Parliament, but if it won an electorate seat it would be entitled to enter Parliament and potentially bring in more MPs. The memorandum of understanding stated that the agreement would remain in force until at least six weeks after polling day. The two component parties agreed to review their arrangement within five weeks of the election.

Multiple opinion polls prior to the election suggested Internet Mana could receive more than two per cent of the party vote, which would give Internet Mana multiple MPs if it could retain Te Tai Tokerau. The only poll of that electorate suggested a very close race; in that poll 38% said they would give Harawira their electoral vote, while 37% said they would vote for his main challenger, Labour's Kelvin Davis.

On election night, Harawira lost Te Tai Tokerau, receiving 8,969 electorate votes to Davis's 9,712. Internet Mana received 1.42% of the party votes. Without an electorate seat or 5% of the party vote, the coalition failed to have any representation.

Dotcom said to reporters on election night that "I take full responsibility for this loss tonight, because the brand—the brand Kim Dotcom—was poison for what we were trying to achieve." The parties later separated. After the election, Laila Harré resigned as leader of the Internet Party and the party told its members that it was concentrating on efforts to build its internal structures to support its grassroots movement. In December 2016, Kim Dotcom posted a poll on Twitter asking if his followers wanted the Internet Party to stand in the 2017 election.

=== 2017 election ===
The Internet Party remained leaderless until 8 February 2017, when it appointed Suzie Dawson, an activist and citizen journalist who had been seeking temporary asylum in Russia since 2016, as the party's new leader for the 2017 election. The party ran eight list candidates. During the 2017 general election, the Internet Party won 499 votes (0.02%) – the lowest party vote result for any registered party – and failed to win any seats in the New Zealand House of Representatives.

In a tweet of April 2018, Suzie Dawson said that she was no longer eligible to run for Parliament as she had lived outside New Zealand for more than three years, and so was resigning as party leader. She said that she had been elected party president instead.

The party was deregistered on 12 June 2018 because its membership had dropped below the 500 required for registration.

=== Current status ===
As of August 2022, the Internet Party has not announced that it has dissolved. However, the party has not contested local or general elections since the 2017 general election. The party remains unregistered. The party applied for broadcasting funding in May 2020 for the 2020 general election. It received $41,457 of funding conditional on achieving party registration, but it did not register. In August 2022, party founder Kim Dotcom tweeted that the party would be "in the Beehive" in 2024.

== Policies ==
The party used a consultative process to form policies with its membership using online platforms with policy writers following the forum in the background.

During its launch in 2014, the party set an agenda which included the following broad aims:

- Provide unlimited high-speed internet to all New Zealanders, 50% cheaper than current prices;
- Build another submarine communications cable connecting New Zealand to the world;
- Create new high-tech jobs;
- Restrict government surveillance;
- Review the Trans-Pacific Partnership Agreement;
- Copyright reform;
- Encourage clean energy and green technology;
- Reduce social inequality.

== Electoral results ==
Election	Candidates nominated		Seats won	Votes	Vote share %	Government
Election	Electorate	List	Seats won	Votes	Vote share %	Government
2014	15	32	0 / 121	34,095	1.42%	Not in parliament
2017	0	8	0 / 120	499	0.02%	Not in parliament

== See also ==
- Internet Party and Mana Movement
- Pirate Party of New Zealand
- Criticism of copyright
- Digital rights
- Kim Dotcom
