= Kelvyn Alp =

New Zealand politician and activist

2nd Leader of New Zealand Loyal
- Incumbent
- Assumed office 30 November 2024
- Deputy: John Alcock
- Disputed with: Liz Gunn

1st Leader of the Direct Democracy Party of New Zealand
- In office 2005 – 30 June 2009
- Succeeded by: Party dissolved

1st Leader of the OurNZ Party
- In office 2011 – 25 September 2011 Serving with Rangitunoa Black
- Succeeded by: Will Ryan

Personal details
- Born: Kelvyn Glen Alp; 27 March 1971 (age 55)
- Party: NZ Loyal
- Other political affiliations: Direct Democracy Party of New Zealand (2005–2009); OurNZ Party (2011)
- Domestic partner: Hannah Spierer
- Children: 2

Kelvyn Glen Alp (born 27 March 1971) is a New Zealand far-right politician and activist. During the 1990s, Alp established a paramilitary organisation called the New Zealand Armed Intervention Force. During the 2020s, Alp and his partner Hannah Spierer founded a far-right media platform called Counterspin Media, which played an active role in leading the 2022 Wellington protest. In 2024, he became the leader of New Zealand Loyal, succeeding Liz Gunn and taking control of a party that had been deregistered earlier that year.

== Paramilitary activism ==
In 1996 Alp set up the New Zealand Armed Intervention Force as a mercenary organisation, later transforming it into a para-military, anti-banking, pro-people rights movement – although it was referred to in the media as a Māori separatist organisation. It is now defunct.

Alp claimed to have used a "Māori Passport" to travel to the Solomon Islands in 2001. Alp has claimed that this practice ended after the New Zealand Labour-led government threatened to pull aid from the Solomon Islands.

== Political career ==
Alp was the leader of the Direct Democracy Party of New Zealand which stood in the 2005 general elections. He also stood for Mayor of Manukau City in 2007.

Alp served as the co-leader of the OurNZ Party alongside Rangitunoa Black. Alp stood in the 2011 Te Tai Tokerau by-election under the OurNZ Party banner coming last place and receiving 72 votes, or roughly 0.5% of the vote. He announced his departure from the party on 26 September 2011, via a Facebook post, proclaiming Will Ryan as his successor.

In 2023, Alp wrote party policy for New Zealand Loyal and supported its unsuccessful campaigning efforts under founding leader Liz Gunn. The next year Gunn attempted to wind up NZ Loyal and had it deregistered by the Electoral Commission. Alp kept the party active, calling an AGM in November 2024 being elected leader.

On 5 August 2025, Alp was announced by the Electoral Commission as one of five candidates for the 2025 Tāmaki Makaurau by-election. In the by-election that was held on 6 September, Alp came in last place, receiving 23 votes based on preliminary results.

The leadership of New Zealand Loyal has been disputed since Alp became leader on 30 November 2024, after its initial deregistration. Gunn asserts that she remains the leader, and that the party under Alp is a "fake NZ Loyal." In response, the Alp-managed New Zealand Loyal stated that the members had taken back control of the party, and that Gunn's attacks on the New Zealand Loyal leadership was "convenient flip-flopping designed to sow chaos and derail re-registration."

During the 2026 New Zealand general election, Alp was ranked first on the New Zealand Loyal party list. He contested the Māngere electorate for NZ Loyal. Based on preliminary results, Alp received 36 votes in the Māngere. NZ Loyal received 1,855 party votes (0.07%), below the five percent threshold needed to enter Parliament.

== Counterspin Media ==
Alp is a director of and programme host for far right media platform Counterspin Media Limited. Counterspin streams on the Steve Bannon-led GTV network, whose content has been described as "a significant source of fake news and misinformation". A Counterspin contributor interrupted a press conference by New Zealand Prime Minister Jacinda Ardern in November 2021, loudly shouting misinformation about COVID-19 vaccines, leading Ardern to temporarily halt the event.

Alp was an agitating force at the Convoy 2022 New Zealand protest between February and March 2022, calling for the protestors to storm parliament and arrest MPs.

In mid-August 2022, Alp and fellow Counterspin Media host Hannah Spierer featured in Stuff's Circuit documentary Fire and Fury, which examined various anti-vaccination and far right figures and groups involved in the 2022 Wellington protest. The documentary's producers including journalist Paula Penfold did not interview Alp and Spierer on the grounds that they did not want to give them a platform but instead used their videos, social media posts, and media coverage relating to their activities. In response, broadcaster Sean Plunket hosted Alp on his online radio station The Platform to share his side of the story regarding Fire and Fury.

== Legal problems ==
=== Christchurch mosque shootings livestream ===
On 25 August 2022, Alp and Spierer were arrested in Christchurch on charges of distributing an objectionable publication, and for failing to allow Police to search their computer. The pair had allegedly distributed footage of the 2019 Christchurch mosque shootings on Counterspin Media. The pair were subsequently bailed and ordered to appear at the Christchurch District Court on 30 August. During the hearing on 31 August, the pair refused to enter the dock and instead read prepared statements from the lawyer's bench. After ignoring Judge Large's repeated instructions to stand in the dock, Alp and Spierer were forcibly removed by security personnel and remanded on bail for three weeks. 60 pro-Counterspin demonstrators and a smaller group of counter-demonstrators demonstrated outside the Christchurch District Court.

The pair subsequently reappeared at the Christchurch District Court in December 2022. In addition to the charge of sharing the objectionable documentary of the Christchurch mosque shooting, Alp was charged with "failing to carry out obligations in relation to a computer search." In late October 2023, Judge Bruce Davidson confirmed that the couple's objectionable publication case had been transferred from Christchurch to the Wellington District Court for the defendants' convenience. A pre-trial date of 14 February 2024 was set.

On 14 February 2024, Alp and Spierer attended pre-trial proceedings at the Wellington District Court. Davidson issued an interim order suppressing the defence and Crown counsels' arguments. In mid-July 2024, the couple's lawyer Tim Leighton challenged the Crown's use of 14 terabytes of data extracted from dozens of devices seized by Police from the defendants. He argued that they were journalists and had a right to protect their sources. Leighton argued that the Crown's digital evidence was inadmissible due to issues around privacy privileges and data restructuring. The Wellington High Court justice has reserved their decision.

=== 2021 unlawful travel ===
During a COVID-19 lockdown on 22 October 2021, Alp and Spierer were arrested after travelling from Auckland (which was under an Alert Level 3 lockdown) to Wellington to support anti-vaccination activist Sue Grey during a hearing at the Wellington High Court. Alp was arrested by Police for travelling without applying for a travel exemption. In late May 2024, his case against the Police for wrongful arrest was dismissed by Judge Kevin Kelly of the Wellington District Court.

== Personal life ==
Alp is the partner of Hannah Spierer, a former Green Party activist and the co-founder of Counterspin Media. The couple have two children.
