= New Zealand Loyal =

Political party in New Zealand

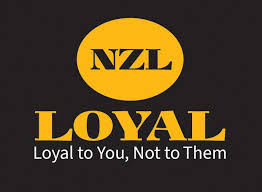
- Abbreviation: NZ Loyal
- Leader: Kelvyn Alp / Liz Gunn (disputed)
- President: Brenton Faithfull
- Founder: Liz Gunn
- Founded: June 2023; 3 years ago
- Ideology: Conspiracism
- Political position: Far-right
- Colours: Yellow & black
- Slogan: "Loyal to You, Not to Them".

Website
- nzloyal.com

The New Zealand Loyal Party, also known as NZ Loyal, is a far-right conspiracist political party in New Zealand. It was founded in June 2023 by anti-vaccination activist, and ex-TVNZ news presenter, Liz Gunn. In the 2023 general election the party won 1.2% of the party vote and no seats. The party was deregistered in 2024 but remained active under the leadership of Kelvyn Alp. It was re-registered in August 2026.

== Policy positions (2023) ==
For the 2023 election campaign, the party described itself as opposed to "globalist interests" and in favour of "very little state interference in your life".

=== Constitution ===
NZ Loyal pledged to:

- Pull New Zealand out of international bodies including the United Nations, World Economic Forum, and World Health Organization.
- "Establish" a New Zealand constitution, despite the already existing, uncodified Constitution of New Zealand.
- Oppose "race-based policies".
- Support limited, de-centralised government.
- Place a moratorium on immigration.

=== Enquires and investigations ===
Three separate policies promised investigations into the Reserve Bank of New Zealand, the "Green Agenda", and the media.

=== Health ===
As a prominent anti-vaccination activist, Liz Gunn gave a health policy statement that opposed "covid kill shots" and repeated false claims about vaccines and autism. She called the government's response to the COVID-19 pandemic a "mini-holocaust". She promoted conspiracy theories about "big pharma" and the Federation of State Medical Boards.

Gunn spoke in favour of pseudoscientific and alternative medicines and treatments including:

- Acupuncture
- Ayurvedic medicine
- Homeopathy
- Quantum healing
- Water therapy
- "Sound and light frequency therapy".

Other health-related policy positions opposed:

- Water fluoridation
- GMOs
- Abortion.

=== Education ===
Leader Liz Gunn's policy statement on education promised to:

- End New Zealand's "morally bankrupt education system".
- Reduce the number of university students.
- End "corrupt sex and gender 'education'" in schools.
- Teach children "objective morality".

=== Economy ===
NZ Loyal's economic policy statement was cast as a fight against the "Agenda 2030 plan to completely control every aspect of your lives", reflecting a critical view of the UN's sustainable development goals. The party's policies included:

- Economic self-sufficiency and "full spectrum economic dominance" through the nationalisation of assets including "communication", transport infrastructure, water, the energy grid and power stations.
- More oil and gas production, in response to the supposed environmental damage done by electric cars and batteries.
- An end to reserve bank independence, which Gunn described as private ownership.
- Battling and defeating unnamed global bankers over government debt.
- In a single line, both a "free and open market" and preferential use of local suppliers in housing and infrastructure.
- Ending "excessive money printing" to prevent hyperinflation.
- A 1% transaction tax as part of a simplified tax code.

== 2023 general election ==
New Zealand Loyal received 1.2% of the party vote in the 2023 general election, failing to reach the 5% required to gain seats in parliament. None of the party's 33 electorate candidates were successful.

=== Party list issues ===
NZ Loyal intended to enter a 15-person party list, but failed to register most of those individuals in time. The party misunderstood different deadlines that applied to its party list and its "bulk information schedule" about constituency candidates. Consequently, NZ Loyal's official party list contained Gunn, Peter Drew and Phillip George Engel, who left the party before voting opened. Had NZ Loyal passed the 5% vote threshold the remaining two candidates would have become MPs with the rest of the party's seats left vacant.

Gunn initially took responsibility for the administrative debacle, putting it down to "human error" within the party. Some days later she instead blamed "contradictory advice" from the Electoral Commission, which the party suspected may have been deliberate sabotage. Chief electoral officer Karl Le Quesne said that the Commission worked closely with all parties before and during the nomination period, that NZ Loyal submitted a list with three candidates within time, and that they had asked to add more people after the 14 September deadline.

At the High Court in Wellington on 6 October, the Electoral Commission argued that deadlines and time frames should be strictly observed. NZ Loyal argued that the court could simply declare that the list had been submitted before the deadline. The judge called this a "novel and creative" idea and said that, "If you leave it to the last minute and something goes wrong, the responsibility falls squarely on the party." No changes were allowed to the party list.

== Deregistration and rebuild (2024–present) ==
On 29 July 2024 the party's registration was cancelled at its own request. A few days later, on 1 August, Liz Gunn applied to personally trademark NZ Loyal's name, logo, and slogans for a range of uses including printed material, advertising, political fundraising, and political lobbying. As of 19 August 2024 her application is pending with the Intellectual Property Office of New Zealand.

In a series of back-and-forth videos over the following weeks Kelvyn Alp of Counterspin Media, a far-right platform that had been involved and supportive in NZ Loyal's run for Parliament, accused Gunn of unilaterally shutting down the party in violation of its constitution, and of financial improprieties. Alp positioned himself as the main architect of the party's policies. Gunn responded to his claims by accusing him of stealing information from the party.

In November 2024, a new party board declared its intention to rebuild the party and fight the next election. At an AGM they elected Alp as leader, and Brenton Faithfull as party president. Also on the new "interim board" are Peter Verhoven and Marilyn Park.

Alp ran under the party banner in the 2025 Tāmaki Makaurau by-election and gained 26 votes, the lowest of any candidate. Party founder and former leader Liz Gunn responded to Alp's candidacy by accusing him of "theft".

The leadership of New Zealand Loyal has been disputed since Alp became leader on 30 November 2024, after its initial deregistration. In June 2026, the party applied for re-registration. On 15 July, Gunn posted to Facebook, asserting that she remains the leader, and that the party under Alp is a "fake NZ Loyal." Gunn also claimed that Alp was bankrupt, falsely suggesting that it would prevent him from running in the 2026 election. In July, Alp issued a response, stating that the members had taken back control of the party, and that Gunn's attacks on the New Zealand Loyal leadership was "convenient flip-flopping designed to sow chaos and derail re-registration." In August, the party's registration was accepted, however, the Electoral Commission received 90 submissions opposing the registration. Conversely, New Zealand Loyal's application to register a party logo was denied as a result of ongoing legal action, meaning that the party will appear on the ballot paper without a logo.

During the 2026 New Zealand general election held on 7 November, based on preliminary results, NZ Loyal received 1,855 party votes (0.07%); below the five percent threshold needed to enter Parliament.

== Officeholders ==
=== List of leaders ===
No.	Name	Portrait	Assumed office	Left office
1	Liz Gunn		June 2023	incumbent (disputed)
–	Interim leadership board		c. August 2024	30 November 2024
2	Kelvyn Alp		30 November 2024	incumbent (disputed)

=== List of deputy leaders ===
No.	Name	Assumed office	Left office	
1	Logan Courtney	7 October 2023	March 2024	Gunn
Position vacant (March 2024 – 8 November 2025)
2	John Alcock	8 November 2025	c. September 2026	Alp
3	Paul Teio	c. September 2026	incumbent	Alp

== Electoral results ==
Election	Candidates nominated		# of seats won	# of party votes	% of party vote
Election	Electorate	List	# of seats won	# of party votes	% of party vote
2023	33	3	0	34,478	1.21%
2026	16	17	0	TBD	TBD
