= OurNZ Party =

- Leader: Will Ryan
- Founder: Kelvyn Alp; Rangitunoa Black
- Founded: 2011

The OurNZ Party was a political party in New Zealand. The party advocated a new currency, a 1% transaction tax, a written constitution, and binding referendums. Its founding leaders were former Direct Democracy Party leader Kelvyn Alp and Rangitunoa Black.

Kelvyn Alp represented the party in the June 2011 Te Tai Tokerau by-election, gaining 72 votes, coming last in a field of five.

In September 2011 the party's logo was registered by the Electoral Commission, and announced it would merge with the Republic of New Zealand Party.

Kelvyn Alp announced his departure from his role on 25 September, saying that Will Ryan would take over as interim party leader. Although the party had expressed an intention to contest the November 2011 general election, and had selected at least one person to stand for it, there were no OurNZ candidates registered with the Electoral Commission when nominations closed. It did not stand any candidates at the 2014 election.
