= Liz Gunn =

New Zealand anti-vaccination activist

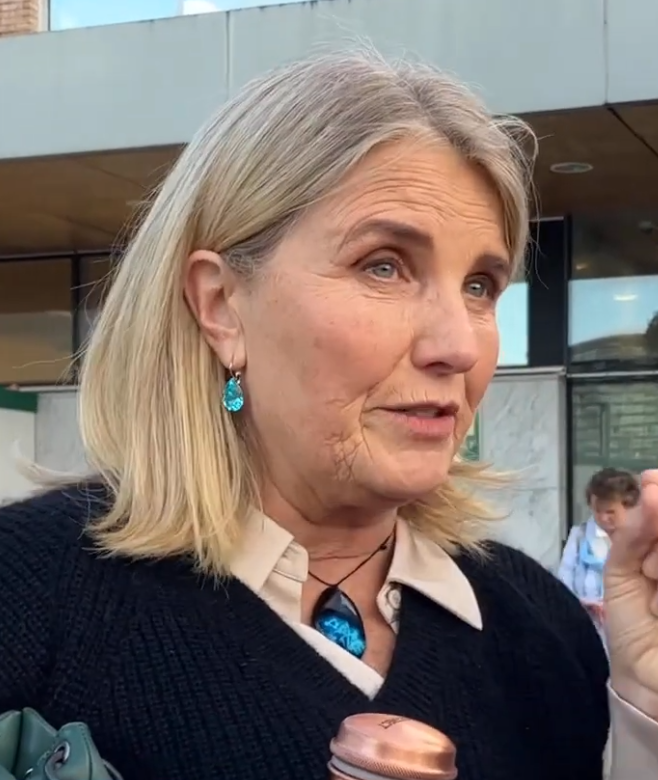
- Gunn in 2021

1st Leader of New Zealand Loyal
- Incumbent
- Assumed office June 2023
- Deputy: Logan Courtney
- Disputed with: Kelvyn Alp (since 30 November 2024)

Personal details
- Born: Elizabeth Jane Gunn; 1959 or 1960 (age 65–66)
- Party: New Zealand Loyal
- Occupation: Broadcaster, activist
- Known for: Anti-vaccination activism

Elizabeth Jane Cooney, commonly known as Liz Gunn (born 1959 or 1960), is an anti-vaccination activist, conspiracy theorist, and a former television presenter from New Zealand. In 2023 she founded the New Zealand Loyal Party, which she led until the following year.

== Early life ==
Liz Gunn was the second child of Chisne and Max Gunn (d. 2015 and 2009 respectively). Max was an accountant who became known as an activist shareholder in the 1980s. He married late in life after serving in World War II. Liz said she had a "difficult relationship" with her mother Chisne, who self-medicated back pain with alcohol. Her uncle Jack Gunn captained the New Zealand Davis Cup team.

== Law and broadcasting career ==
Gunn was a litigation lawyer before beginning her TV career on the TVNZ show Sunday in 1992. From 1997, she was the first Breakfast newsreader, becoming one of the show's co-hosts (alongside Mike Hosking) in 2001. She unexpectedly quit that role on-air during the year's last episode. By then she had also begun broadcasting on Radio New Zealand. Other television roles included reporting for Holmes and newsreading on 1News. Gunn moved to Australia after her TV presenting days ended in 2002, returning to New Zealand a decade later. She rejoined RNZ until 2016.

In 2017, she became a director and one-third shareholder of a new company, Lifeforce Water Limited.

== Anti-vaccination activism ==
During the 2020s she became a leader in the anti-vaccination movement in New Zealand, and championed conspiracy theories about the COVID-19 vaccine causing harm. When an earthquake struck the North Island in October 2021, Gunn called it Mother Nature's response to vaccination targets (which she described as "jab rape") and other covid-related policies implemented by the "tyrannical" Prime Minister, Jacinda Ardern.

She was a leader and spokesperson in the 2022 protests occupying the New Zealand parliament grounds.

In December 2022 she was the spokesperson for parents who refused to allow their child to have a blood transfusion using blood donations from vaccinated people. She livestreamed an interview with the family's lawyer Sue Grey in which Grey named the baby and Gunn named the parents. This breached a suppression order and led to Grey being disciplined by the New Zealand Lawyers and Conveyancers Disciplinary Tribunal.

=== Auckland Airport assault accusation ===
In February 2023 Gunn touched Auckland Airport security co-ordinator, Anna Kolodeznaya, during an incident at the airport's international arrivals gate. Along with cameraman Jonathan Clark, she was there to film the arrival of an unvaccinated family arriving from Tokelau. Gunn and Clark were asked to stop using professional filming equipment without permission. An argument followed and Gunn grabbed Kolodeznaya's arm, hurting her. They scuffled with the security guard then Gunn and Clark were arrested. Kolodeznaya testified that Gunn asked her, “Where are you from originally?” and said, “the way it started in Germany was with little freedoms being taken”. Gunn also described Kolodeznaya and another airport worker as "real Nazis".

In March Gunn pled not guilty to charges of assault, trespass, and resisting arrest. Along with Clark her trial started on 7 May 2024. Speaking to supporters at the court, she asked for prayers and said that New Zealand ought to "come back home to God".

==== Judgement, conviction, appeal ====
Both Gunn and Clark were found not guilty of resisting arrest. The judge dismissed the trespass charge. Gunn was convicted of assault in the District Court but successfully appealed to the High Court. The first judgement, delivered on 21 May 2024, described Gunn's behaviour at the airport as "arrogant, rude, overbearing and offensive".

She was convicted and discharged without sentence in November 2024. The judge agreed that Gunn's offence was low level but noted her "remarkable lack of insight" or remorse, as well as her "entirely self-serving" actions which served her "broader political purpose".

Gunn's successful challenge was heard in the High Court in February 2025. Justice Mary Peters described the incident in the airport as "trivial" and found that a miscarriage of justice had occurred.

== New Zealand Loyal (2023–24) ==
Political party New Zealand Loyal was founded by Liz Gunn in June 2023, who led it into the general election that year. In the party's launch video she discussed conspiracies involving fluoridation, 1080, Bill Gates, "gender programming", the World Economic Forum, media, the 15-minute city urban planning concept, the "brown mafia", and odd weather patterns. She requested donations of up to $1,000,000 and stated an ambition to have 500 people (the minimum required to register a party) join within a week.

Gunn said at the time that it is a "compliment" to be called a conspiracy theorist, but by the end of the election campaign she was tired of that label.

New Zealand Loyal was registered two months after Gunn's initial announcement. Its official logo included the slogan, "Loyal to You, Not to Them". Gunn said that the slogan refers to "the globalists".

The party was officially deregistered at what the Electoral Commission called the party's own request in July 2024, but that November a new party board claimed that Gunn had deregistered the party unilaterally. Without Gunn's involvement, the party has remained active.

The leadership of New Zealand Loyal has been disputed since Kelvyn Alp became leader on 30 November 2024, after its initial deregistration. Gunn asserts that she remains the leader, and that the party under Alp is a "fake NZ Loyal." In response, the Alp-managed New Zealand Loyal stated that the members had taken back control of the party, and that Gunn's attacks on the New Zealand Loyal leadership was "convenient flip-flopping designed to sow chaos and derail re-registration."

=== 2023 general election ===
NZ Loyal intended to enter a 15-person party list in the 2023 New Zealand general election, but failed to register most of those individuals in time. Ultimately, Gunn was one of only two candidates on the party list. She consequently started calling a vote for NZ Loyal a "protest vote" that would reduce the number of MPs in parliament, by effectively electing empty seats.

Gunn initially took responsibility for the administrative debacle, putting it down to "human error" within the party. Some days later she instead blamed "contradictory advice" from the Electoral Commission, which she suspected may have been deliberate sabotage. The party had misunderstood the difference between deadlines for its "bulk information schedule" about constituency candidates and its actual party list.

New Zealand Loyal stood candidates in 33 electorates. Liz Gunn was not one of them.

During the 2023 election, NZ Loyal received 1.20% of the party vote (34,456 votes), and won no electorates, so did not enter parliament. Having claimed during campaigning that her party would win 2 million votes, Gunn's response to preliminary results was that New Zealand was ruled by a "criminal cabal and at the very least, utter bullies."
