= Internet Party and Mana Movement =

Coalition party during the 2014 New Zealand general election

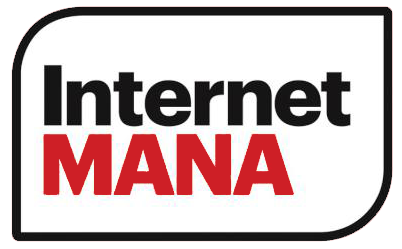
- Abbreviation: Internet Mana
- Co-Leaders: Hone Harawira; Laila Harré
- Founded: May 2014
- Dissolved: 13 December 2014; 11 years ago
- Merger of: Internet Party; Mana Movement
- Ideology: Collaborative e-democracy Māori rights

The Internet Party and Mana Movement, also stylised as Internet Party and MANA Movement or simply Internet MANA, was a coalition of the Internet Party and the Mana Movement formed to contest the party vote in the 2014 New Zealand general election.

== History ==
In May 2014, Internet Party chief executive Vikram Kumar and Mana Movement leader Hone Harawira announced a merger of the parties, to be known as the Internet Party and Mana Movement, or the abbreviated Internet Mana. Harawira is the founding leader of the party. Mana member Sue Bradford resigned immediately after the merger was announced. The party and its logo were registered with the New Zealand Electoral Commission on 24 July 2014, allowing the party to contest the party vote.

The Internet Party and Mana Movement contested the 2014 general election as a single entity. The memorandum of understanding between the Mana Movement and Internet Party gave the Mana Movement first, third and fourth places on the combined party list, while the Internet Party took second, fifth and sixth places. Subsequent places on the party list alternate between the two component parties. Electorate candidates stood as members of their respective parties rather than Internet Party and Mana Movement. The memorandum of understanding states that the agreement would remain in force until at least six weeks after polling day. The two component parties agreed to review their arrangement within five weeks of the election.

The Internet Party and Mana Movement was funded by online millionaire Kim Dotcom. It failed to win a seat in parliament. Dotcom, who was not a candidate because he is not a New Zealand citizen, told reporters as election results became clear, "I take full responsibility for this loss tonight because the brand—the brand Kim Dotcom—was poison for what we were trying to achieve."

Following post-election reviews by both components of the Internet Mana Movement, the relationship was dissolved on 13 December with both sides agreeing there had been 'no regrets' about the decision made to run together.

== Electoral results ==
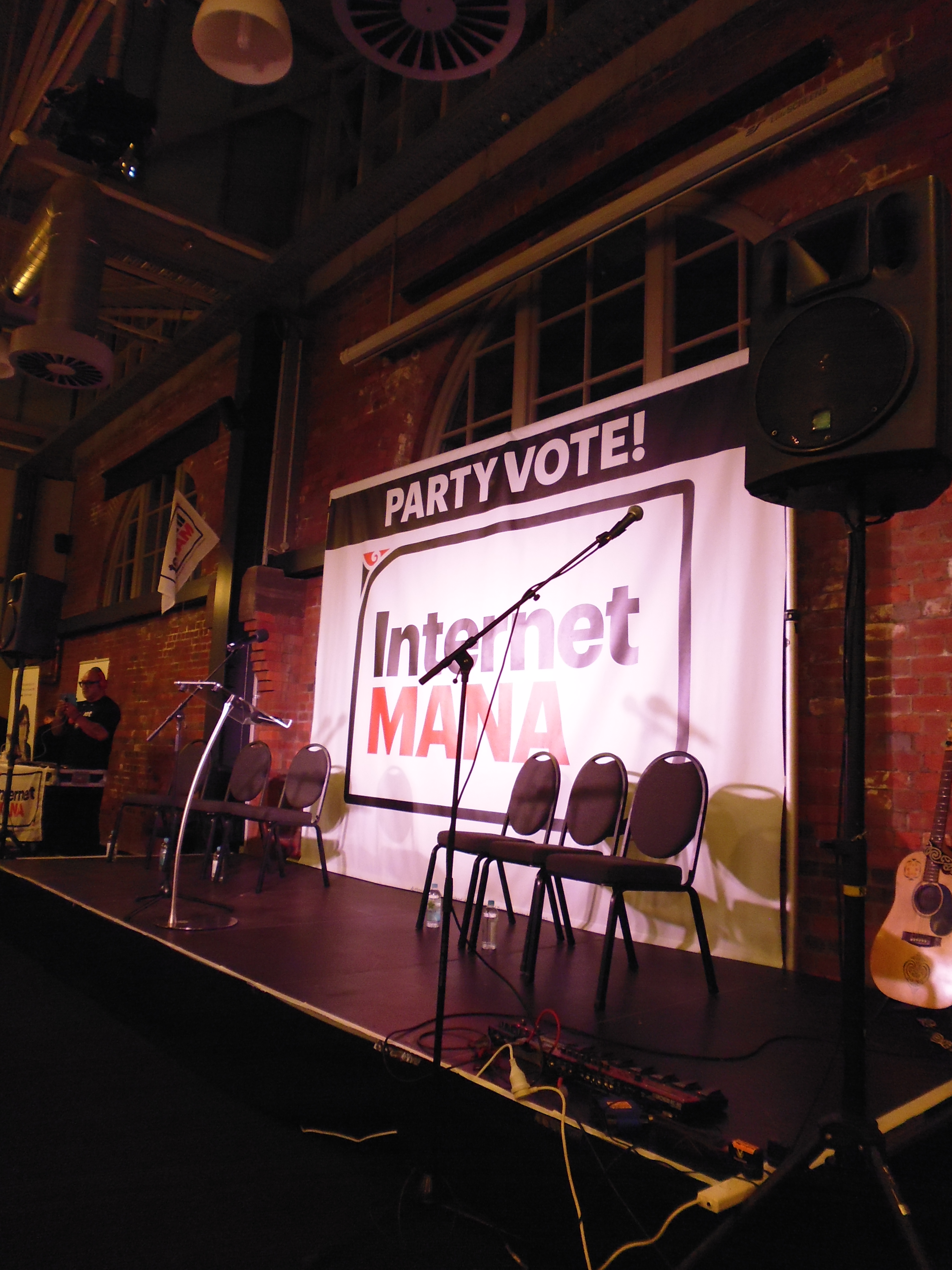
Stage at an Internet MANA rally in August 2014

Election	# of party votes	% of party vote	# of seats won	Government/opposition?
2014	34,094	1.42	0 / 121	Unelected

== See also ==
- Te Pāti Māori
