= Mana Movement =

- Leader: Hone Harawira
- President: Lisa McNab
- Secretary: Andrew Paul
- Founded: 30 April 2011
- Dissolved: 3 May 2021
- Split from: Māori Party
- Youth wing: Mana Rangatahi
- Ideology: Tino rangatiratanga Māori rights
- Political position: Left-wing
- Colors: Red, black

Website
- mana.org-nz

The Mana Movement, originally known as the Mana Party, was a political party in New Zealand. The party was led by Hone Harawira who formed it in April 2011 following his resignation from the Māori Party. Harawira won the by-election in Te Tai Tokerau of 25 June 2011 for the Mana Party and retained the seat during the 2011 general election in November.

Under a short-term agreement with the Internet Party, a joint Internet Party and Mana Movement contested the 2014 general election with the Mana Movement providing the first, third and fourth list candidates. Despite being funded by online millionaire Kim Dotcom, the Internet Party and Mana Movement failed to win a single seat. Harawira lost his seat to Labour Party candidate Kelvin Davis, and with only 1.42% of the party vote, Internet Mana did not return to parliament. (Note: Under New Zealand's mixed member proportional representation system (MMP), a party without electorate MPs must gain 5% of the party vote to gain seats in parliament.)

During the 2017 general election, the Mana Movement took 0.1% of the party vote and failed to gain any seats. It did not contest the 2020 general election and instead endorsed the Māori Party.

On 3 May 2021 the party's registration was cancelled at its own request.

== Principles and policies ==
Mana describes itself as "a political waka for all peoples" with a specific focus on giving a voice to "the poor, the powerless and the dispossessed" and on striving to "empower them against the government by the rich and powerful for the rich and powerful".

Policies include:

- Establishing Government-funded breakfast and lunch programmes in all decile 1 and decile 2 schools.
- Abolition of the Goods and Services Tax (GST) and the establishment of a tax on financial transactions ("Hōne Heke" tax).
- Nationalisation of monopolies and duopolies.
- Full employment.
- Build 10,000 new state houses a year.
- A living wage of $18.80hr
- Free education from preschool through to tertiary.
- Full amnesty for Pacific Island overstayers.
- Make Te Reo Māori a core curriculum subject in schools.

== History ==
=== Formation ===
The party was formed following Hone Harawira's resignation from the Māori Party after that party's disciplinary committee recommended his expulsion. He had been vocal in his opposition to the Māori Party's position on the foreshore and seabed issue. Harawira began organising a new party to compete with the Māori Party, and attracted the support of left-wing activist John Minto and of former Green MPs Nándor Tánczos and Sue Bradford. The party formally launched on 30 April 2011.

On 4 May 2011 Harawira stated his intention to resign his seat (Te Tai Tokerau) in order to be recognised as a candidate of the Mana Party in any subsequent by-election; after his resignation from the Māori Party, parliamentary rules on political parties in the House recognised Harawira only as an Independent MP. Following criticism by Labour, the Greens and the Māori Party that the by-election would be "a ridiculous publicity stunt" and would cost the NZ taxpayer $500,000, Harawira put his resignation on hold, saying that he wanted to take the decision back to the people of his Te Tai Tokerau electorate. He announced his resignation from Parliament, forcing the Te Tai Tokerau by-election, on 11 May 2011.

Possible candidates for other constituencies included Māori lawyer and party co-vice president Annette Sykes and former Alliance organiser and party chairman Matt McCarten. Harawira stated that he hoped that five Mana MPs would enter the 50th New Zealand Parliament after the 26 November 2011 New Zealand general election.

The party applied for registration on 24 May 2011; registration was granted on 24 June 2011; and in September 2011 the Electoral Commission registered the party's logo.

=== 2011 general election ===
The Mana Party did not receive taxpayer-funded television airtime during the 2011 general-election campaign, as it was formed after the 17 March deadline for funding applications.

Mana ran seven candidates in Māori electorates and 14 in General seats; a total of 21 on their list. Harawira comfortably retained his seat in Te Tai Tokerau and Annette Sykes polled over 5,000 votes in the Māori stronghold of Waiariki. Countrywide, Mana gained just under 20,000 votes, 1% of the electorate.

Due to the New Zealand MMP electoral system, gaining an electorate seat was an important achievement for the party as this is often the first step in achieving a long term parliamentary presence, as shown by Peter Dunne and Jim Anderton. This was achieved against strong competition for the Māori vote within the electorate; by the Māori Party and the Labour Party, rather than by tactic agreement as was the case with ACT/National in the Epsom electorate.

=== 2013 Ikaroa-Rāwhiti by-election ===
In the June 2013 Ikaroa-Rāwhiti by-election Mana candidate and former Māori Television presenter Te Hamua Nikora came second place with 26.1% of the vote.

=== 2013 local elections ===
John Minto stood as the Mana Party candidate for Auckland mayor in the 2013 local body elections. Minto's flagship policy was free public transport for Auckland. On the John Minto for Mayor ticket there were multiple candidates standing for councillor and local board positions across Auckland for the 2013 local body elections. Minto was the fifth-highest polling candidate for mayor, with Len Brown re-elected by a significant margin.

=== Internet Party and Mana Movement, 2014 ===
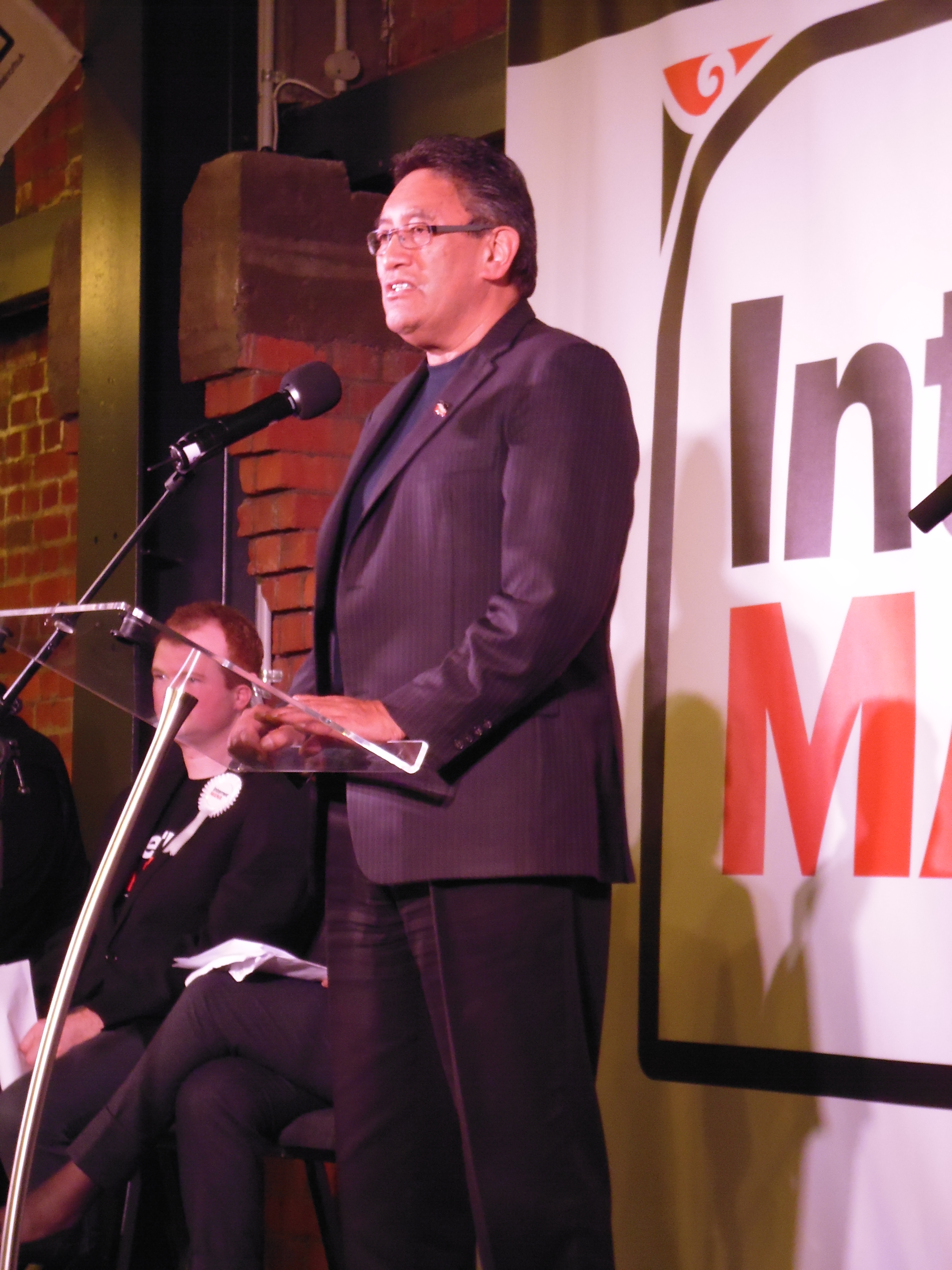
Harawira speaks at a rally of the Internet Party and Mana Movement in August 2014.

In May 2014, Mana leader Hone Harawira and Internet Party chief executive, Vikram Kumar, announced an alliance between the parties. Mana member Sue Bradford resigned in response. The Internet Party named Laila Harre as its first leader shortly afterwards, with the Mana Party having "had a hand" in her selection.

The combined entity, the Internet Party and Mana Movement, contested the 2014 general election. The memorandum of understanding between the Mana Movement and Internet Party gave Mana the first, third and fourth places on the Internet Mana Party list. Electorate candidates stood only as members of the Mana Movement rather than Internet Party and Mana Movement. The agreement will remain in force until at least six weeks after polling day. The two component parties agreed to review their arrangement within five weeks of the election.

Despite being funded by online billionaire Kim Dotcom, the Internet Party and Mana Movement failed to win a single seat in the election. Dotcom, who was not a candidate because he is not a New Zealand citizen, told reporters as election results became clear, "I take full responsibility for this loss tonight because the brand—the brand Kim Dotcom—was poison for what we were trying to achieve."

=== 2017 general election ===
Hone Harawira ran again in Te Tai Tokerau as the Mana Movement leader, utilising a memorandum of understanding with Māori Party to not contest in any electorates where Māori Party are running candidates, with the aim of regaining all the Māori electorates from the New Zealand Labour Party. The party will run four list candidates, including two electorate candidates. In addition to Harawira, Papalii James Papali'i ran in Māngere.

During the 2017 general election, Hone Harawira failed again to regain his seat in Te Tai Tokerau and was defeated by the incumbent Deputy Opposition Leader Kelvin Davis. The party took 0.1% of the party vote, below the five percent threshold needed to enter Parliament.

=== 2020 general election ===
The party did not contest the 2020 election. It instead endorsed the Māori Party for both the electorate and party votes, and used its resources to campaign for its former rival.

=== Extra-parliamentary activism ===
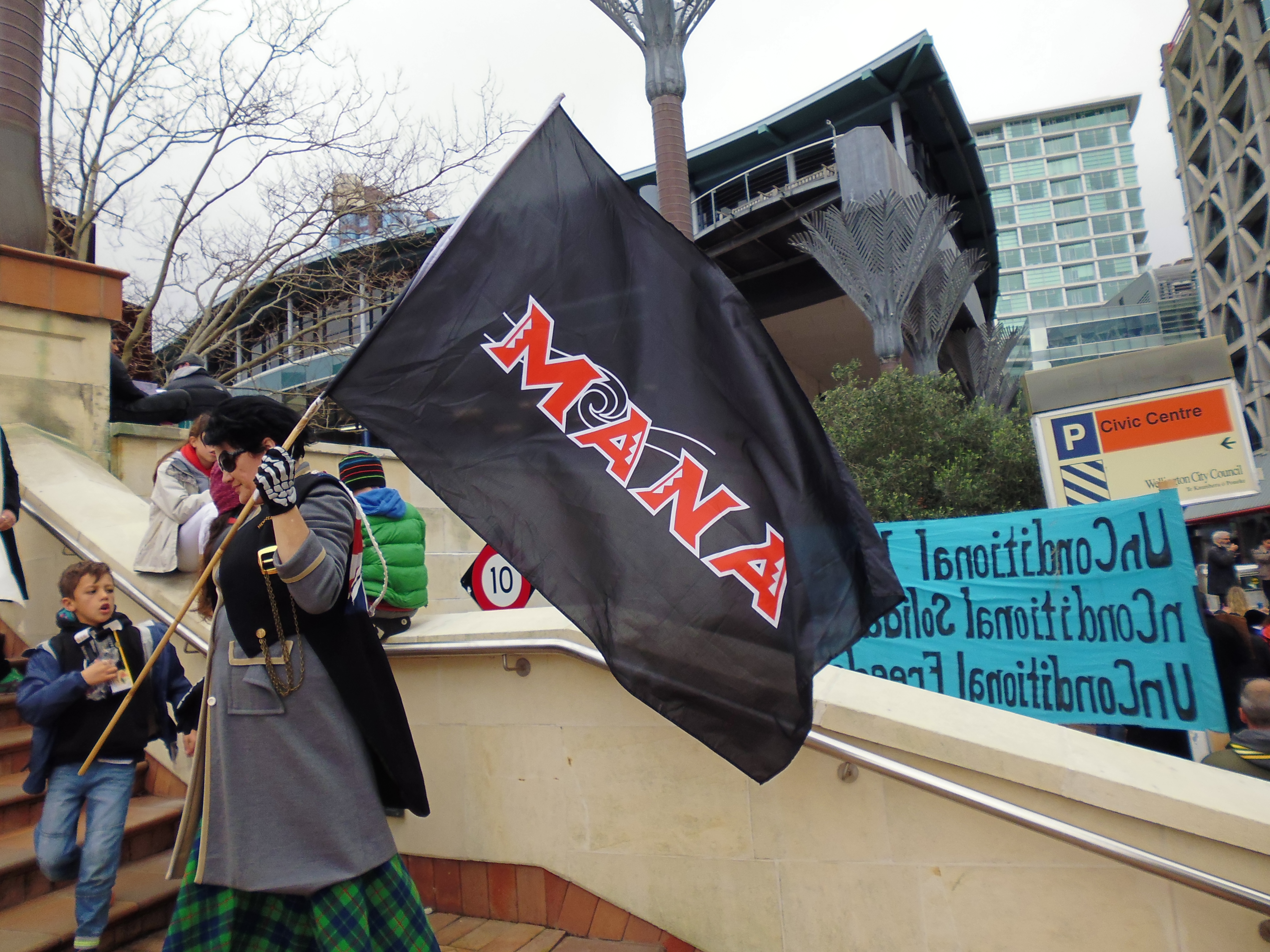
A protester with a Mana Party flag at a rally in Wellington, New Zealand in August 2014

Since its formation, Mana activists have been involved in multiple extra-parliamentary campaigns against the policies of the National Government. Mana activists were prominent in the local protests of the Occupy Movement, opposition to the Trans-Pacific Partnership Agreement and the privatisation of energy companies.

Since early 2012, in the working-class Auckland suburb of Glen Innes scores of Mana activists including Hone Harawira and John Minto have been arrested protesting the privatisation of state housing and the eviction of hundreds of residents.

In 2013, in the South Auckland suburb of Māngere members of Mana's Māngere Branch led a successful campaign against a proposed motorway through the suburb which would have destroyed hundreds of homes and cut across the grounds of three local schools. Mana has also organised protests that has led to the removal of illegal gaming machines from a fast food shop in Ōtara.

In 2014, Mana began publishing and distributing its own newspaper MANA News to its supporters around the country and online. As of September 2020, it had last updated in May 2019.

The party de-registered on 5 May 2021.

== Electoral results ==
=== Parliament ===
Election	# of candidates nominated (electorate/list)	# of Māori seats won	# of seats won	# of party votes	% of popular vote
2011	21/21	1 / 7	1 / 121	24,168	1.08%
2014	18/32	0 / 7	0 / 121	34,095	1.42%
2017	2/4	0 / 7	0 / 120	3,642	0.1%

=== Mayoral election results ===
Election	# of seats won	# of party votes	% of popular vote
2013	0 / 1	11,591	3.37%

== Party presidents ==
Name	Term
Annette Sykes	2011–2014
Lisa McNabb	2014–2021

== See also ==
- Māori politics
- Te Pāti Māori
