= Hone Harawira =

New Zealand Māori activist and politician

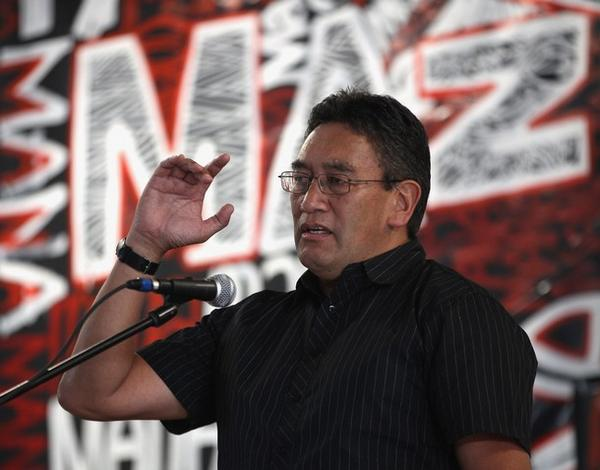
- Hone Harawira in 2011

Leader of the Mana Movement
- In office 30 April 2011 – 3 May 2021

Member of the New Zealand Parliament for Te Tai Tokerau
- In office 2005–2014
- Preceded by: Dover Samuels
- Succeeded by: Kelvin Davis

Personal details
- Born: 6 January 1955 (age 71) Whangārei, New Zealand
- Party: Mana Movement (2011–2021)
- Other political affiliations: Independent (2011); Māori Party (until 2011)

Hone Pani Tamati Waka Nene Harawira is a New Zealand Māori activist and former parliamentarian. He was elected to parliament as the member for the Māori electorate of Te Tai Tokerau in 2005 as the Māori Party candidate.

In 2011, following a rift with party colleagues, Harawira resigned from the Māori Party. He subsequently announced the formation of the Mana Party, and then resigned from parliament to trigger the Te Tai Tokerau by-election, which he won as leader of the new party. Mana, now the Mana Movement, campaigned alongside the Internet Party in the 2014 general election, but failed to return Harawira or the party to parliament. He also stood unsuccessfully in 2017.

During the COVID-19 pandemic, Harawira led community efforts to roadblock parts of the Far North District in 2020 and 2021.

== Early years ==
Harawira was born to John Puriri Harawira and Titewhai Harawira in Whangārei on 6 January 1955. He was raised in West Auckland and attended St Stephen's School, a boarding school for Māori boys, and the University of Auckland. He credits people like Muhammad Ali, Syd Jackson, Nelson Mandela, Māori Marsden, his mother and his wife for teaching him "the need for strength, commitment, wisdom and vision". His mother descends from the Ngāti Hau, Ngāti Wai and Ngāti Hine tribes, his father from Te Aupōuri, Ngāpuhi and Ngāti Whātua, and he is part Pākehā. He married Hilda Halkyard from the Ngāti Haua hapū (subtribe) of Te Rarawa.

== Activism ==
His mother was a prominent Māori activist. Harawira played a role in Treaty of Waitangi issues, Māori language revitalisation, land occupations, and Māori broadcasting. In 1979 Harawira was part of He Taua, which confronted drunk University of Auckland engineering students who performed a parody of the "Ka Mate" haka with obscenities painted on their bodies. He Taua responded to the cultural insult, which resulted in the engineering students sustaining several broken bones. In 2009 when he and his wife revisited the School of Engineering Harawira said "When people refuse to do what's right, at the end of the day you step in, do what you've got to do." He was a key participant in He Taua, the 1981 Springbok tour protests, and the 2004 foreshore and seabed hīkoi, the last of which led to him entering parliament.

== Member of Parliament ==
New Zealand Parliament
Years	Term	Electorate	List	Party
2005–08	48th	Te Tai Tokerau	none	Māori Party
2008–11	49th	Te Tai Tokerau	3	Māori Party
2011	Changed allegiance to:			Independent
2011	49th	Te Tai Tokerau		Mana Party
2011–14	50th	Te Tai Tokerau	1	Mana

=== First term in Parliament: 2005–2008 ===
Harawira stood in the 2005 general election as the Māori Party candidate for the seat of Te Tai Tokerau, and was elected to parliament. As a member of parliament, he has continued to support community activism, while also advancing legislative change. Harawira has remained outspoken, breaking protocol to open parliament in Māori; saying the former Australian Prime Minister "John Howard is a racist bastard" for his intervention into aboriginal affairs; being fined for leaving a planned parliamentary overseas tour to make headlines over aboriginal rights; and for continually challenging the government's Māori MPs for "not defending Māori rights". A student at Waikato University complained about Harawira in April 2009 after an incident where Harawira swore in response to a question referring to Māori as a "minority group". He claimed that the political science student, Steve Baron, was a racist who "lumped Māori in with other minorities like homosexuals and Asians.....He tried it on and he got his comeuppance."

=== Second term: 2008–2011 ===
Harawira writes a regular column in the Kaitaia-based newspaper The Northland Age, entitled Ae Marika. In the edition dated 29 October 2009, during the time he was on a parliamentary trip in Europe, he wrote: "...we've been scrapping and squabbling and brawling and bawling about this, that and the other thing for so long that all of the original Waitangi Tribunal claimants are now long dead." "...the European Union...27 distinct languages and hundreds of different dialects...political diversity...everyone doing their best to talk with one another, and work together!" "So hangin' with these folks has been a great learning experience." "...I for one learned heaps."

Following his return from Europe, in November 2009, Harawira was asked to repay some travel costs after skipping a taxpayer-funded conference in Brussels to go sightseeing in Paris. "How many times in my lifetime am I going to get to Europe? So I thought, 'F*** it, I'm off. I'm off to Paris'," he said. In a subsequent email exchange with Buddy Mikaere (a former director of the Waitangi Tribunal), who had criticised Harawira's actions, Harawira responded, stating "Gee Buddy, do you believe that white man bullshit too do you? White motherf***ers have been raping our lands and ripping us off for centuries and all of a sudden you want me to play along with their puritanical bullshit.... And, quite frankly, I don't give a shit what you or anyone else thinks about it. OK?". Harawira's email was seen as racist and heavily criticised by the media, other members of parliament, and members of the public.

After a lengthy discussion process, the Māori Party decided that he would not face punishment. On Radio Waatea he apologised for the wording of his email but not for the sentiment of it. He also said in an apology "My words were true." Harawira later said that Labour Party leader Phil Goff was a "bastard" and "should be lined up against a wall and shot" for passing the Foreshore and Seabed Act.

On 31 July 2010 Harawira told The New Zealand Herald he "wouldn't feel comfortable" if one of his children came home with a Pākehā partner, but he asked whether "all Pākehās would be happy with their daughters coming home with a Māori boy? The answer is they wouldn't." He was asked, since some of his whānau have dated Pacific Islanders and he didn't have an issue with it, "does that make him prejudiced?" He said "Probably, but how many people don't have prejudices?"

Ngāpuhi activist David Rankin said Harawira was "playing the race card every time he wants to 'create a smoke screen for other issues'". Rankin is Harawira's cousin and claims seniority over the Harawira family in the Matarahurahu hapū. He noted that Harawira's grandfather was a Pākehā, saying "Harawira has a blind spot. His family even changed their name from Hatfield to Harawira because they are in denial about their racial identity."

In contrast, Māori Party co-leader Pita Sharples said Harawira's comments probably reflected the views of many people and were not racist. Also in his New Zealand Herald interview, Harawira said, when asked "why not be an independent MP?" that "I came here because the Maori Party provided me, and us, with the opportunity to change the world and I recognise the value of that."

==== Split with Māori Party ====
On 16 January 2011 in an interview published in the Sunday Star-Times, Harawira was highly critical of the Māori Party's relationship with the National Party, in particular over the Foreshore and Seabed issue, saying "If we support this bill, we’re effectively saying that our coalition with National is more important than our commitment to Māori – surely not?"

On 19 January 2011 the Māori Party received a complaint from one of its MPs, Te Ururoa Flavell, which was supported by all the party's other MPs, Rahui Katene, Pita Sharples, and Tariana Turia. A leak of the internal complaint document showed that all of the other Māori Party MPs had "lost trust and confidence" in Mr Harawira, that he "acted unethically and without integrity" and that he "deliberately undermined" the party and the leaders. A few days afterwards, Harawira called the procedure being followed to investigate the complaint a "joke" and "farcical", denying him natural justice. "I also think that it's very, very pākehā the way it's being run" he said. In a later response, Harawira described his party colleagues as "dickheads".

On 7 February 2011 Harawira was suspended from the Māori Party caucus, with a statement by Turia and Sharples saying they had lost faith in him after five years of ill-discipline. He responded saying he wishes to stay with the party and stand for it in the 2011 election.

On 23 February 2011 Harawira left the Māori Party after the party's disciplinary committee recommended his expulsion. His resignation coming following the Māori Party's support for the National Party, in particular over the Foreshore and Seabed issue, on 8 March 2011 Harawira missed the vote in parliament for the crucial second reading of the legislation which replaced the Foreshore and Seabed Act.

==== Formation of the Mana Party ====
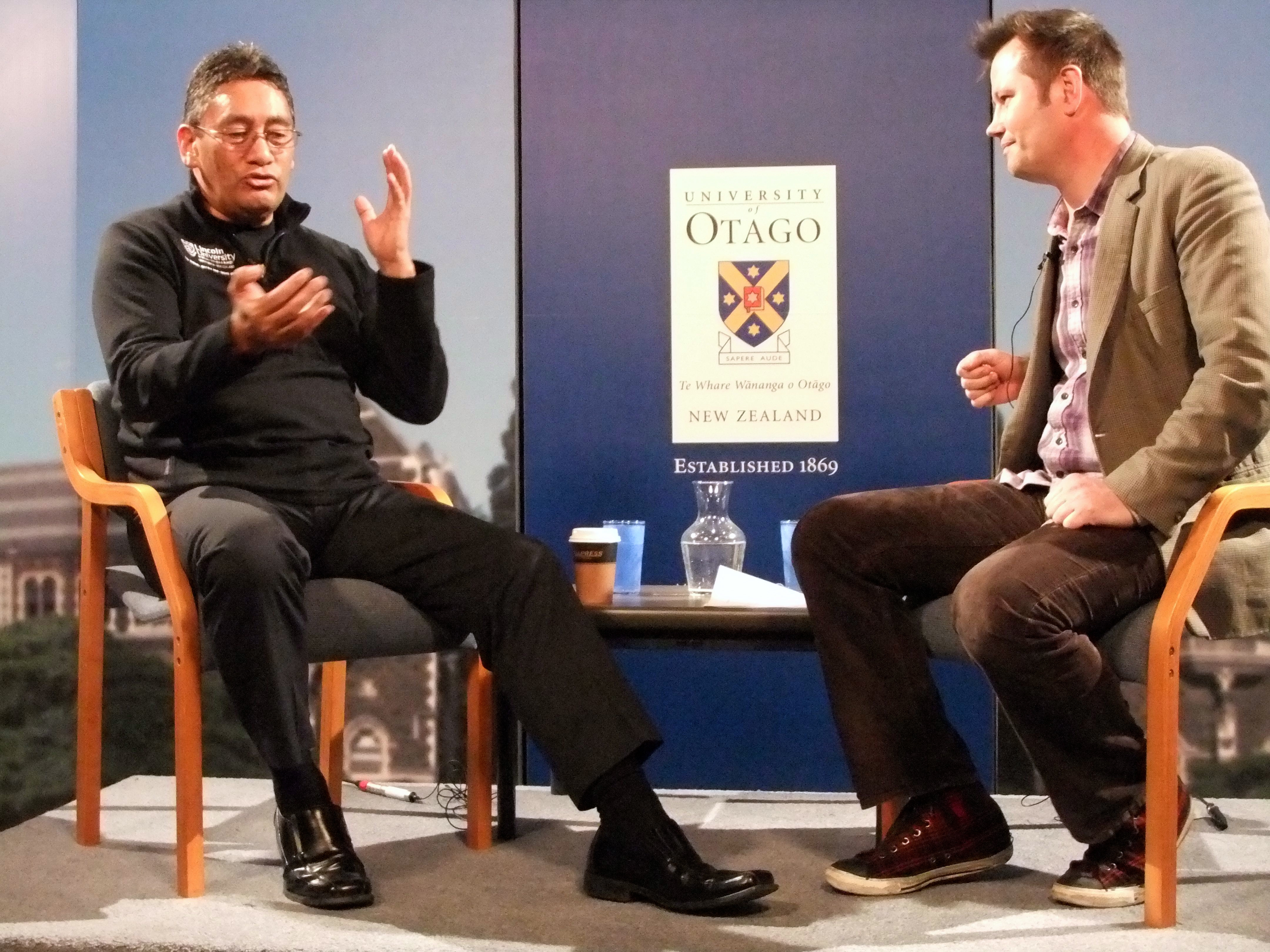
Harawira speaking with University of Otago academic Bryce Edwards at a pre-election event in 2011.

On 30 April 2011 he announced the formation of the Mana Party, stating that he would resign from parliament and would contest the resulting by-election. Harawira responded to criticisms that a by-election would be "a ridiculous publicity stunt mainly about the tens of thousands of dollars he stands to gain if he returns to Parliament as a party leader," and that it would cost New Zealand taxpayers $500,000, by arguing for the need to receive a fresh mandate from the people of Te Tai Tokerau, saying that "It's hardly an expense in terms of democracy." On 3 May 2011 he delayed his planned resignation from parliament, saying he wanted to take the decision back to the people of his Te Tai Tokerau electorate. Although he was the leader of the Mana Party, he would remain an independent MP until elected as such.

On 2 May 2011 in an interview on TVNZ's Māori-language programme 'Te Karere', Harawira said that the former leader of Al Qaeda Osama bin Laden's actions were those of "a man who fought for the rights, the land and the freedom of his people" and that people should not be damning him but mourn him. Harawira later explained that Māori do not speak ill of the dead "even if such a person has done bad things", and apologised for how he had expressed himself, saying his mihi to the Bin Laden family was not intended "as support for Bin Laden's actions." Harawira received threats following his remarks about bin Laden, which were dealt with by the police.

Harawira's resignation from parliament as an independent MP on 11 May 2011, effective 21 May, caused a by-election in his Te Tai Tokerau constituency. Harawira ran as the Mana Party's candidate and received 6065 votes, winning the seat with a majority of 1117. Harawira returned to parliament on 14 July 2011 during the Start of Day ceremony but was removed from the chamber by Speaker of the House Lockwood Smith for not pledging the oath of allegiance for newly elected members of parliament required by New Zealand law. He returned on 2 August, affirmed the oath in Māori and as leader of the Mana Party took a seat on the front bench.

=== Third term: 2011–2014 ===
Harawira was returned to parliament as the member for Te Tai Tokerau at the general election held on 26 November 2011.

On 8 November 2012, his private member's bill to provide free breakfast and lunches for all children in decile 1 and 2 schools in New Zealand was drawn from the ballot. The Education (Breakfast and Lunch Programmes in Schools) Amendment Bill, better known as the "Feed the Kids Bill", has been supported by a broad-based Community Coalition for Food in Schools. A TV One opinion poll found 70 percent support for the Bill's proposal.

Alongside his activity in parliament, Harawira has also kept his community work and activism. He helped to organise a free breakfast for 2,000 school children in South Auckland.

He helped to lead protests against the privatisation of state-owned electricity companies and joined locked out meatworkers on their union picket line. On 12 October 2012, Harawira was arrested while peacefully protesting against the demolition of state houses in the Auckland suburb of Glen Innes.

In 2012, Harawira topped a poll by the Māori Television current affairs programme, Native Affairs, which asked which politicians are fighting for Māori rights.

==== Māori MP comments ====
In September 2012 in a post on Facebook, Harawira referred to Māori MPs in the ruling National Party as prime minister John Key's "little house niggers" in response to Key refusing to allow National party members to attend a hui on water rights. His full statement was "Time John Key realised a few home truths like (1) he can tell his little house niggers what to do, but (2) the rest of us don't give a shit for him or his opinions!" The comment prompted party co-leader Pita Sharples to change his mind and attend the hui. In an interview with Rawdon Christie, Harawira defended his statement saying that New Zealand "needed to mature" and that he would not be the first or the last person in the country to use the n-word. Harawira had previously used the n-word in an address to the chamber on 6 November 2007, saying that the United States military had previously operated under the motto "The only good Indian is a dead Indian" and the current American-led war on terror was under the new motto "The only good sand nigger is a dead sand nigger".

==== Internet Mana ====
In the run-up to the 2014 general election, the Mana Movement joined forces with the Internet Party, in a coalition to contest the party vote. Although Internet Mana won 0.18% more of the party vote than the Mana Party in 2011, Harawira was narrowly defeated in his electorate seat by Labour's Kelvin Davis, so with a party vote of 1.42% Internet Mana failed to win any seats.

In the week before the poll, the leaders of the National Party and New Zealand First urged their supporters to vote strategically and support the Labour Party's candidate. The Internet Mana party was pinning its hopes of winning representation in parliament on Harawira retaining his electoral seat. Under New Zealand's Mixed Member Proportional (MMP) electoral system, parties who do not cross a 5% list vote threshold are still entitled to list seats if they win an electorate.

== Post-parliamentary life and career ==
=== 2017 general election ===
Harawira contested the Te Tai Tokerau seat for the Mana Movement in the 2017 general election. In February 2017 the Māori Party had announced it would not stand a candidate against Harawira in a bid to regain the seat from Labour's Kelvin Davis. At the election, Harawira failed to unseat Davis who gained 12,673 votes to Harawira's 7,866. The Mana Movement gained only 1,455 of the electorate's party votes against Labour's 14,446. Mana gained only 0.1% of the party vote nationally (3,642 votes) and failed to gain a seat in parliament.

In June 2017, Harawira called for a Policy of the Death penalty for any Chinese who import methamphetamine to New Zealand.

=== COVID-19 pandemic ===
During the COVID-19 pandemic in New Zealand, Harawira led efforts with local iwi (tribes) to set up roadblocks preventing tourists from travelling into the Far North District. Tourists in the region were encouraged to leave. Roadblocks were set up at State Highway 1 at Whakapara and State Highway 12 at Waipoua, and a testing centre was set up at Waiomio Hill south of Kawakawa. Harawira criticised the government for not stopping tourists from entering the country prior to the border closure on 19 March 2020. On 12 April 2020 Harawira drove 340 km to Auckland, disregarding state imposed travel restrictions.

In late January 2021, Harawira and local Northland iwi established a checkpoint at Waiomio Hill but police shut it down because there was no official requirement for it, and because of road safety concerns. Harawira criticised the lack of COVID-19 testing facilities north of Whangārei over the long weekend and advocated cancellation of the Waitangi Day public festivities scheduled for 8 February at Waitangi.

== See also ==
- Māori politics

New Zealand Parliament
Preceded by Dover Samuels	Member of Parliament for Te Tai Tokerau; 2005–2014	Succeeded by Kelvin Davis
