= Direct Democracy Party of New Zealand =

- Leader: Kelvyn Alp
- Founded: 2005
- Dissolved: 30 June 2009

The Direct Democracy Party (DDP) of New Zealand (2005–2009) was a political party in New Zealand that promoted greater participation by the people in the decision-making of government. The party's leader was Kelvyn Alp.

The Direct Democracy Party of New Zealand was and is unrelated to DDNZ.org (Direct Democracy in New Zealand)

The party challenged the current monetary system and promoted solutions to what it called "irredeemable debt." It aimed to establish a system of binding referendums (similar to the Landsgemeinde used in parts of Switzerland) for all major decisions. The party also advocated for a New Zealand Constitution to protect and enshrine the rights and freedoms of the people.

In 2005 the Direct Democracy Party was registered as a political party. It fielded 32 party members in the 2005 elections, and won 782 votes (or 0.03% of the total vote), failing to get any MPs into parliament.

The party did not apply for broadcasting funding in 2008, nor did it submit a party list. The official results for the party vote in that year's election recorded no votes for the DDP.

The party's registration was cancelled at its own request on 30 June 2009.

Alp founded the OurNZ Party in 2011.

== See also ==
- Kyle Chapman, party member
