= The Republic of New Zealand Party =

Political party in New Zealand

- Leader: (as of 2011) Kerry Bevin
- Founded: Formed April 2005, registered 15 July 2005
- Dissolved: Deregistered 30 July 2009, but activity under the name has continued at least until 2023
- Ideology: Republicanism

The Republic of New Zealand Party (RONZP or RNZP, or "The Republicans") was a registered New Zealand political party which sought to end monarchy in New Zealand. It was a registered party from 2005 to 2009, contesting two general elections in that time and each time receiving the lowest share of the party vote. After deregistration, some members continued in politics under the party name, though from 2011 to 2023, only one person, Jack Gielen, contested elections under the name.

== Policies ==
A 2005 New Zealand Herald article said: "The party's aim is simple: to cut all ties with the British monarchy and install a New Zealander as head of state. A president, elected at large by the citizens, would replace the Governor-General as a figurehead, with parliament continuing as normal." The party also sought to strip the Treaty of Waitangi of any constitutional status, replacing it with a new constitution. It also supported binding referendums, wanting to hold one every six months, and wanted to mend relationships with the USA and allow nuclear-propelled ships into New Zealand waters. It identified most strongly with New Zealand First of all the parliamentary parties.

== Creation ==
The Republic of New Zealand Party was formed in April 2005 through the merger of two republican groups. Its first leader was John Kairau. In August 2005, the party claimed to have 3,000 members.

== Time as a registered party ==
In the 2005 elections, the party won 344 party votes or 0.02%, the lowest party vote count of any registered party. The party also did not win any electorate seats, so did not meet the threshold required to enter parliament. In the 2008 elections the party polled even worse; it received 313 party votes or 0.01%, which again was the worst party vote result.

The party's registration was cancelled in 2009.

== After deregistration ==
Despite deregistering, a handful of the party's members remained active under its name, including burning the New Zealand flag at parliament in a protest in March 2010.

The party's former deputy leader Jack Gielen, who had run for Mayor of Hamilton in 2007, did so again in 2010. He placed last with 404 votes. During the campaign doubts were raised over Gielen's claims that he was "New Zealand Republicans Spokesperson for Mental Health and Suicide prevention." Lewis Holden, chair of New Zealand Republic, said Gielen had nothing to do with New Zealand Republic and was "trying to piggyback off" the group. Gielen responded that the Republic of New Zealand Party was trying to get its membership together, saying "we have 200 members. Provided we get 500 members we can be re-registered for the next [2011] election. We are the real Republicans because I burnt a flag and told Prince Wills to go home. We look at them [the Republican Movement] as a [sic] poser because they are not the real deal."

In September 2011, just before the election, the party announced it would merge with the OurNZ Party. The merger did not go ahead, and the party continued to issue media releases as an independent entity after that. The Republic of New Zealand Party did not register for the 2011 general election and did not run any candidates.

In 2012, media releases indicated the party was working with the Human Rights Party.

Jack Gielen ran for the Hamilton East electorate, under the Republic of New Zealand Party banner, in 2017, 2020, and 2023. In 2017 and 2020, he came last, getting 65 votes and then 28 votes. In 2023, Gielen came ninth out of ten candidates, receiving 40 votes. In 2026, Gielen is standing again in Hamilton East, yet is contesting it as an independent.

== See also ==
- Republicanism in New Zealand
