= Waipiro Stream =

Stream in Wellington, New Zealand

Coordinates: 41°16′56″S 174°46′45″E

Waipiro Stream (sometimes spelt as Wai Piro or Waipirau) is an urban stream in Wellington, New Zealand. The culverted stream once ran through where Parliament House now sits, alongside a second stream to its south, Tutaenui, which ran alongside what is now The Beehive.

== History ==
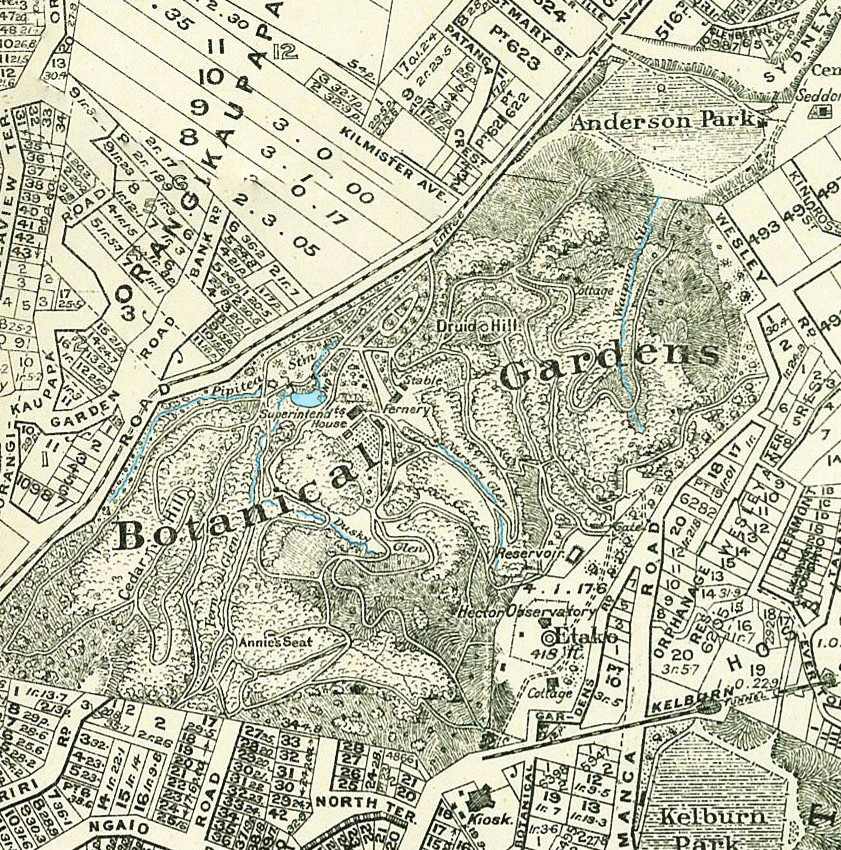
1920s map of the Botanic Garden, showing location of the duck pond and Pipitea, Pukatea and Waipiro Streams

Prior to culverting and land reclamations following the 1855 Wairarapa earthquake, Waipiro and Tutaenui both entered Wellington Harbour where the Wellington Cenotaph now stands, on the corner of Lambton Quay and Bowen Street. Following its culverting, Waipiro now runs down beneath Bowen Street, before crossing Lambton Quay and Whitmore Street out to the harbour. Both Waipiro and Tutaenui are fed by sources from Te Ahumairangi Hill in Thorndon.

The Waipiro once flowed from Honeyman's Gully in the Wellington Botanic Garden down to Sydney Street and out to the harbour. In 1931–34, under the supervision of John Gretton Mackenzie, a ridge was demolished and the Waipiro Stream piped so that a gully could be filled in for the expansion of Anderson Park. In 1960, the Lady Norwood Rose Garden opened on the site of the former gully.

In 2022, in a report commissioned by Let's Get Wellington Moving, urban design consultancy firm Gehl Architects proposed daylighting the stream outside Wellington railway station as part of an urban renewal project.

In 2023, Wellington City Council collaborated with Taranaki Whānui to roll out a series of blue whāriki ('woven mat') designs, painted along cycleways where they crossed paths with the city's buried waterways; three whāriki are painted along the Bowen Street cycleway where it intersects the Waipiro, Tutaenui, and Pipitea streams.

=== Walk the Line ===
Pounamu discs and a speaker that make up Walk the Line

In 2015, an art installation by Joe Sheehan, called Walk the Line, was installed by the Wellington Sculpture Trust at the Wellington Cenotaph, marking the Waipiro Stream's original path by installing 231 pounamu and nephrite discs across the footpath, along with in-ground speakers playing stream sounds recorded at its source on Te Ahumairangi. The artwork was installed as part of a redevelopment of the precinct to commemorate the 100th anniversary of New Zealand's involvement in World War I.

During the 2022 Wellington protest, nine of the artwork's speakers were destroyed by anti-Government protesters who mistook them for "some form of Government-run listening device[s]".

== Etymology ==
The name of the stream translates literally to "putrid, stinking water", from the Māori wai ('water') and piro ('putrid/stinking/stagnant'). The name came from a small pool of stagnant water that used to form on the beach at the stream's mouth.
