= 2022 Wellington protest =

Protests, occupations and riots in New Zealand

2022 Wellington protests
- Part of COVID-19 anti-lockdown protests in New Zealand
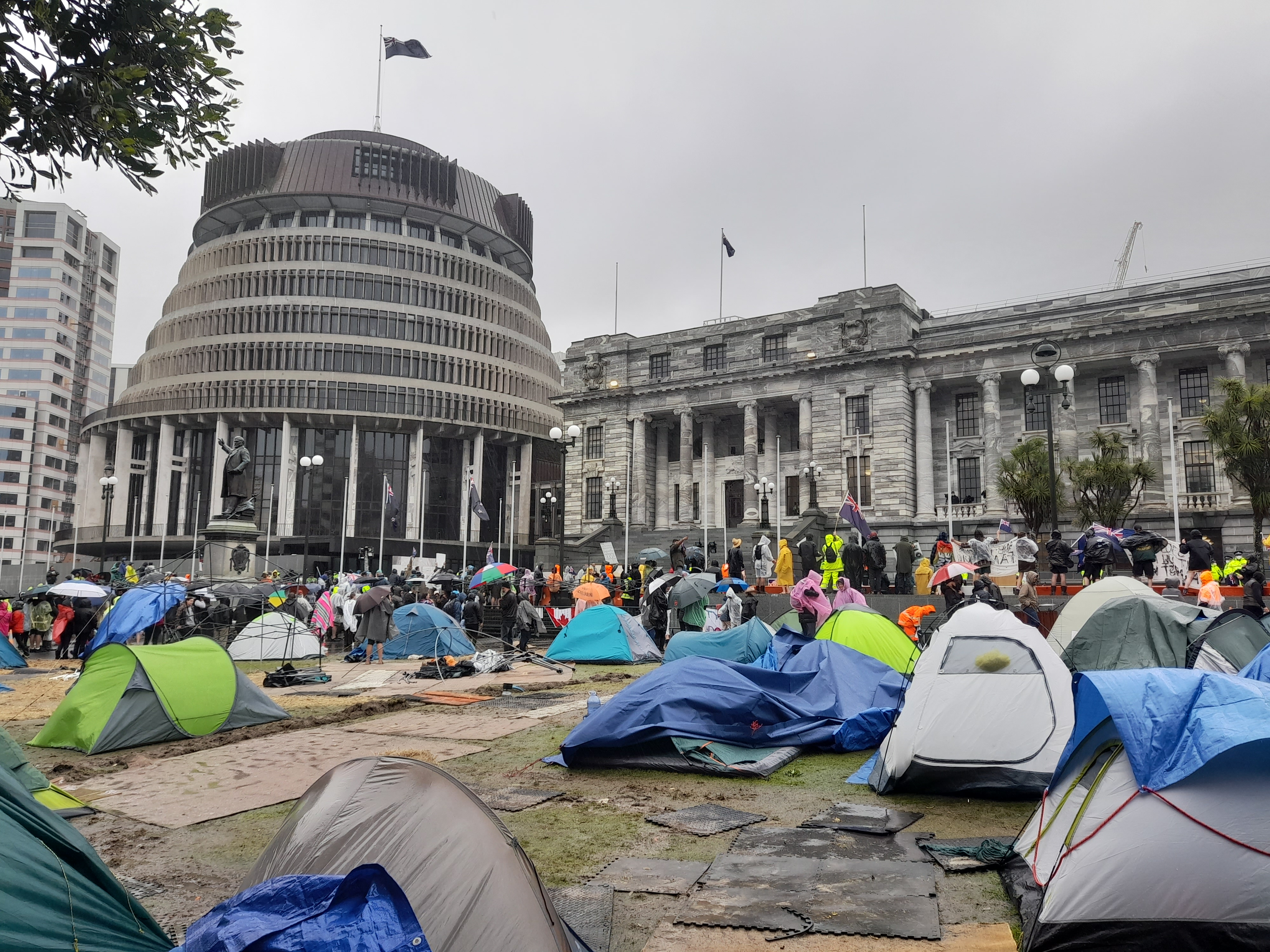
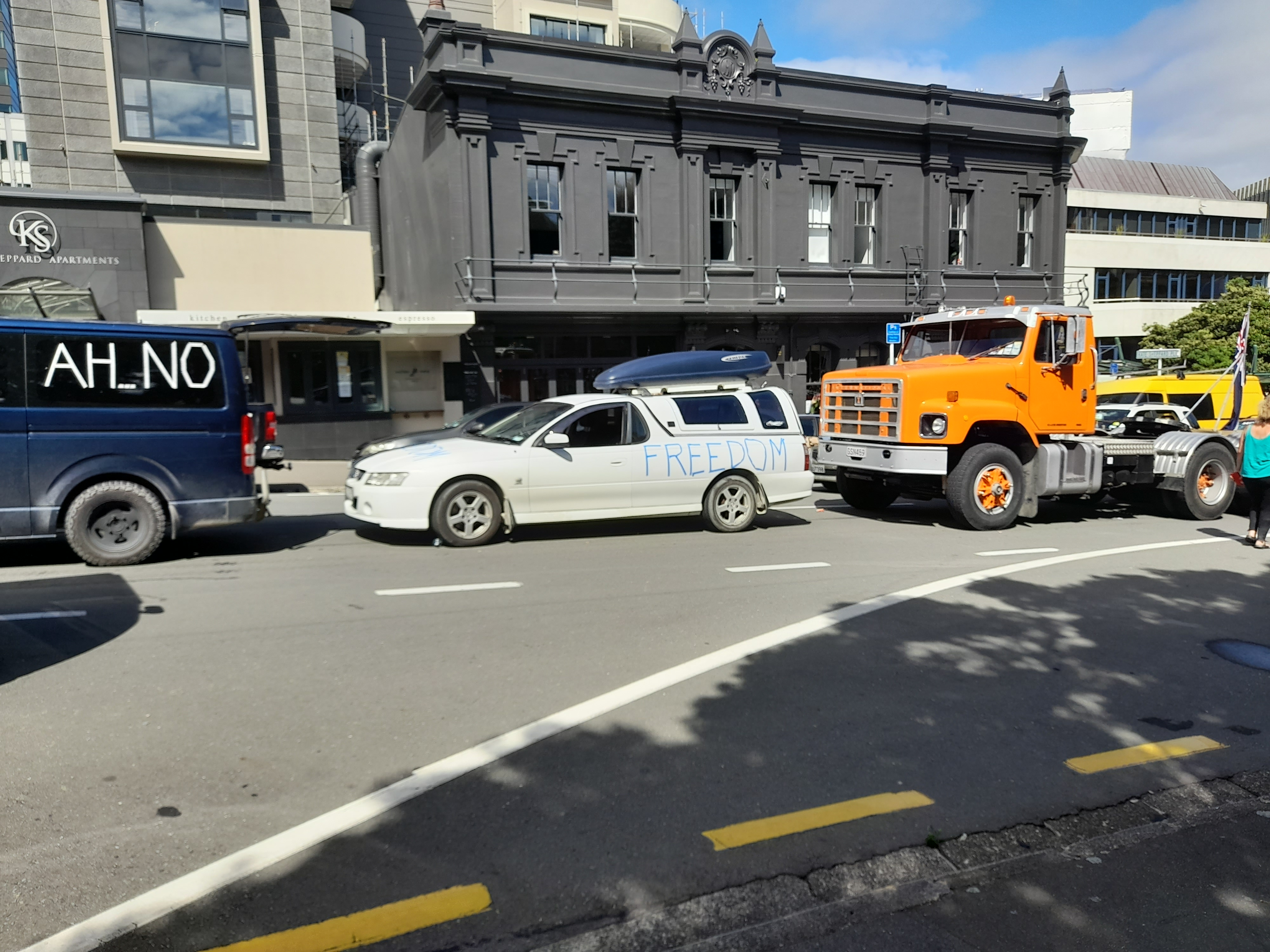
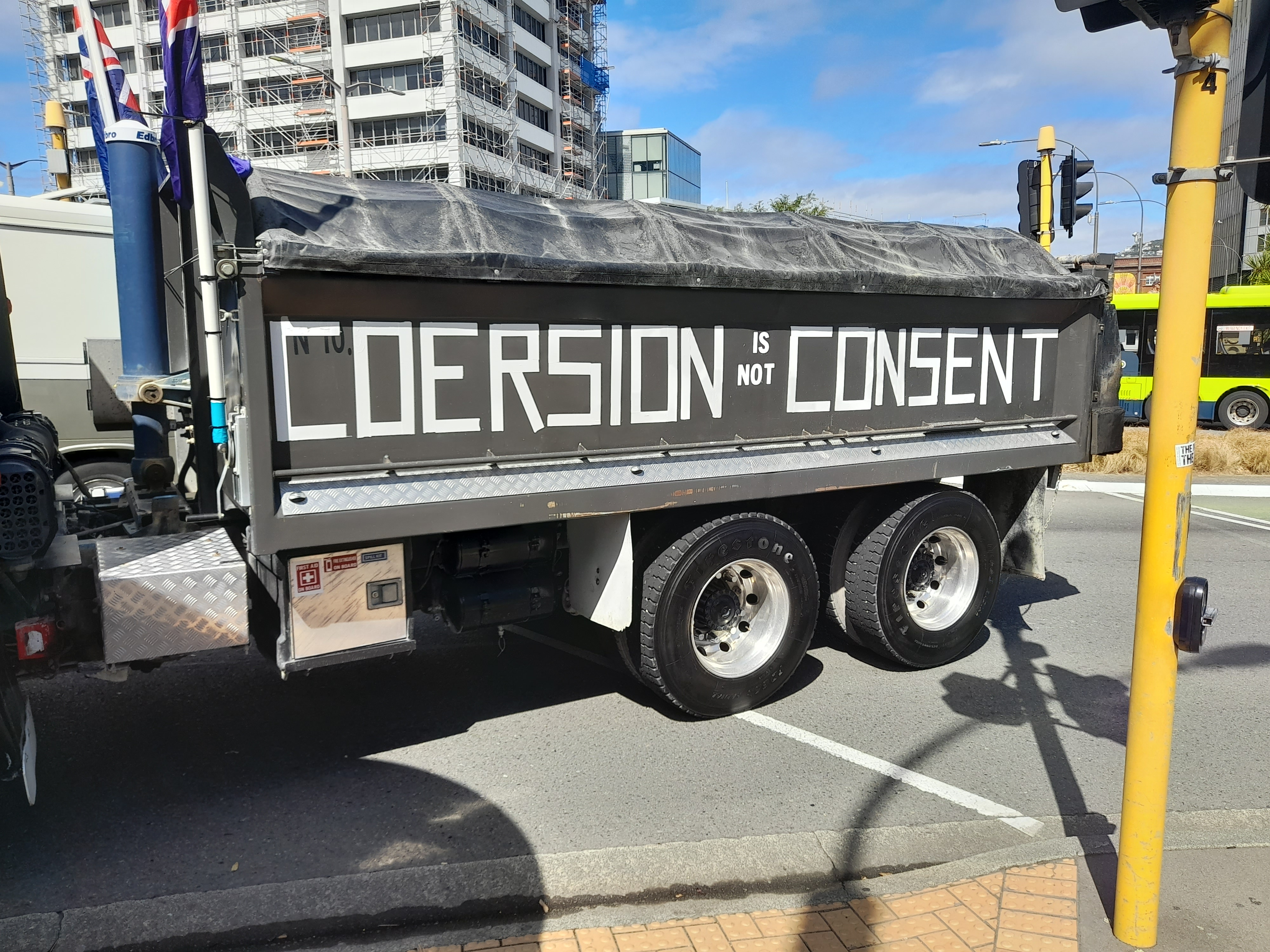
- Protesters and their tents in front of Parliament House in Wellington on 13 February 2022 (top); Vehicles lined up on Molesworth Street on 8 February 2022 (bottom left); A vehicle with a protest slogan on 8 February 2022 (bottom right).
- Date: 6 February 2022 – 2 March 2022 (24 days)
- Location: New Zealand
- Caused by: COVID-19 pandemic in New Zealand, vaccine mandates in New Zealand
- Goals: Reversion of COVID-19 vaccine mandates
- Methods: Demonstration at Parliament House
- Status: Ended: Protests forcibly ended by police; Strategic failure for protesters; No concessions given by the Government; Campsite destroyed and blockade cleared
- Result: Failure

Parties
No official leadership: Convoy NZ; Counterspin Media	Government of New Zealand: New Zealand Police; New Zealand Parliamentary Service; Wellington City Council; New Zealand Defence Force; Iwi: Ngāti Toa; Te Ati Awa

Lead figures
Highly decentralised Brian Tamaki; Leighton Baker; Chantelle Baker; Matt King; Derek Broomhall	Jacinda Ardern; Trevor Mallard; Tūheitia Paki; Corrie Parnell; Andrew Coster; Kara Puketapu-Dentice

Number
Convoy: 200 vehicles (Invercargill, estimates); Several hundred (Timaru, estimates); Protests: 3,000 (police estimates); 800 vehicles (police estimates)	900 police officers; 150 reinforcements

Injuries and arrests
- Injuries: 40 police officers injured
- Arrested: 250
- Charged: 220

The 2022 Wellington protest was an anti-mandate and anti-lockdown occupation of the grounds of Parliament House and Molesworth Street in Central Wellington during the peak of the COVID-19 pandemic. The occupation springboarded off the New Zealand Convoy 2022, a mass convoy of vehicles that made its way from the top of the North Island and the bottom of the South Island to Parliament starting on Waitangi Day (6 February 2022) and arriving three days later on 9 February. The occupation lasted just over three weeks. At its peak, the protest spread over a large area of Thorndon and into Pipitea with approximately 1,000 participants. Protesters blockaded areas around the parliamentary grounds with their vehicles and occupied the lawn and surrounding areas in tents. Some associated with the protests harassed bystanders, and disrupted local businesses. The protest was forcibly ended by police on 2 March 2022, and the protesters had none of their demands met by the Government.

The protesters were a mixed group, but the majority protested the COVID-19 mask and vaccine mandates in New Zealand, while some identified with ideologies such as Trumpism, white nationalism, Christian fundamentalism and antiestablishmentarianism. Māori sovereignty ideology was also present, although local and national Māori leaders denounced the occupation. The protest originally began with a small group from the South Island, and the resulting mixture of motivations led to mixed messaging and eventual internal division. Their protest methods ranged from peaceful to increasingly violent. There were videos of protesters skirmishing with and attacking police, and a report of protesters harassing and egging a teenage girl for wearing a mask. Some protesters hung nooses from trees and made threats to lynch politicians, such as Jacinda Ardern, Grant Robertson and pregnant MP Steph Lewis. Antisemitism was reported to be "rife" within the protests.

Despite the disruption to Wellingtonians, the police initially took a 'light-handed' approach to protesters. Otago University law professor Andrew Geddis suggested the police did not want to escalate the situation. On 2 March, police began to take action, forcibly removing the protesters, which left the parliamentary grounds covered in rubbish, including destroyed tents, hay, and human excrement. Towards the end, some protesters turned violent and injured 40 police officers, putting eight of them in hospital. Arson was committed while protesters were being evicted, causing damage estimated in the millions. Towards the end of the occupation some protest groups began infighting. In December 2023, the Independent Police Conduct Authority (IPCA) released a report outlining six cases of excessive force used by police during the occupation, following 1900 complaints.

== Background ==
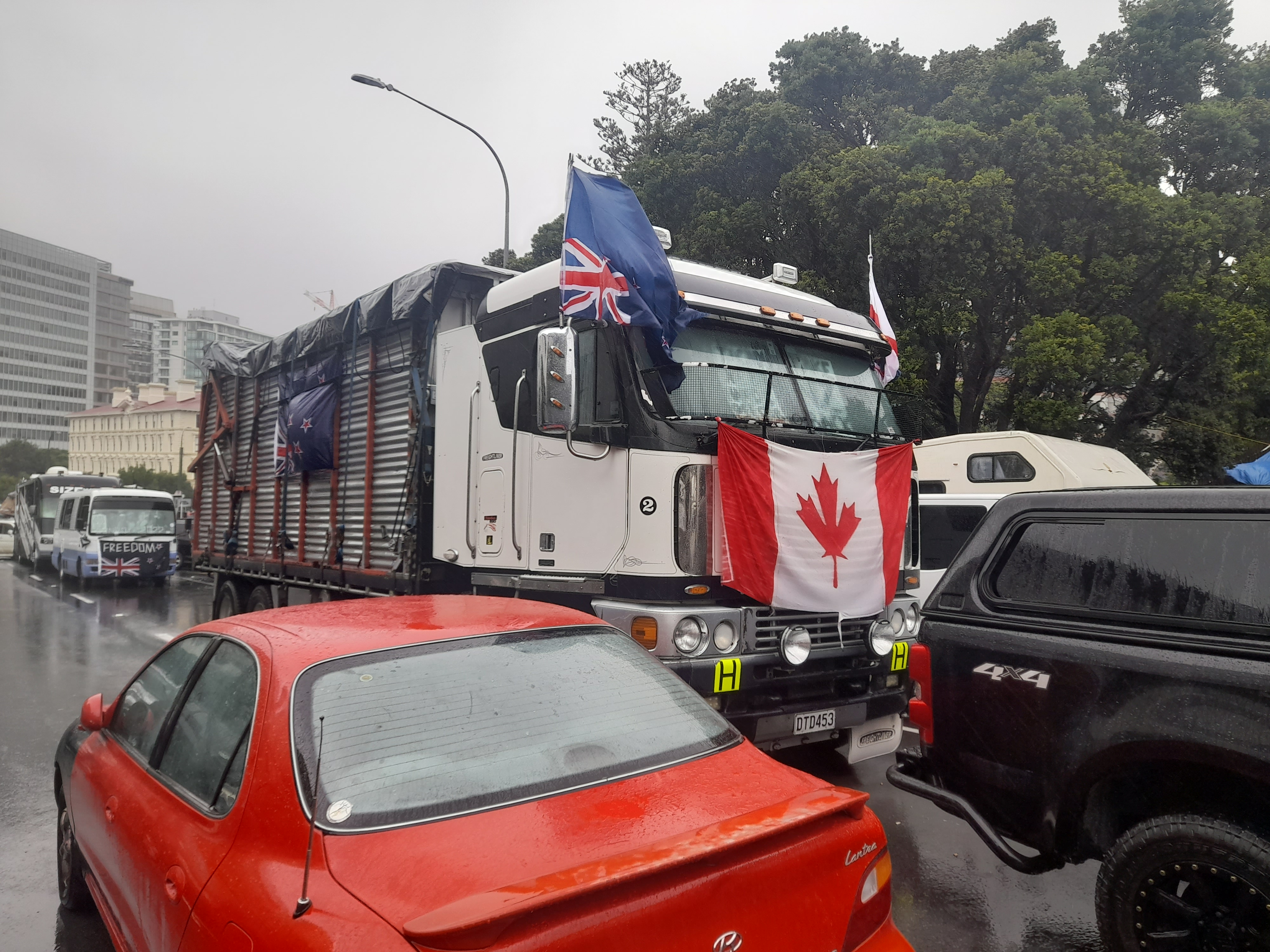
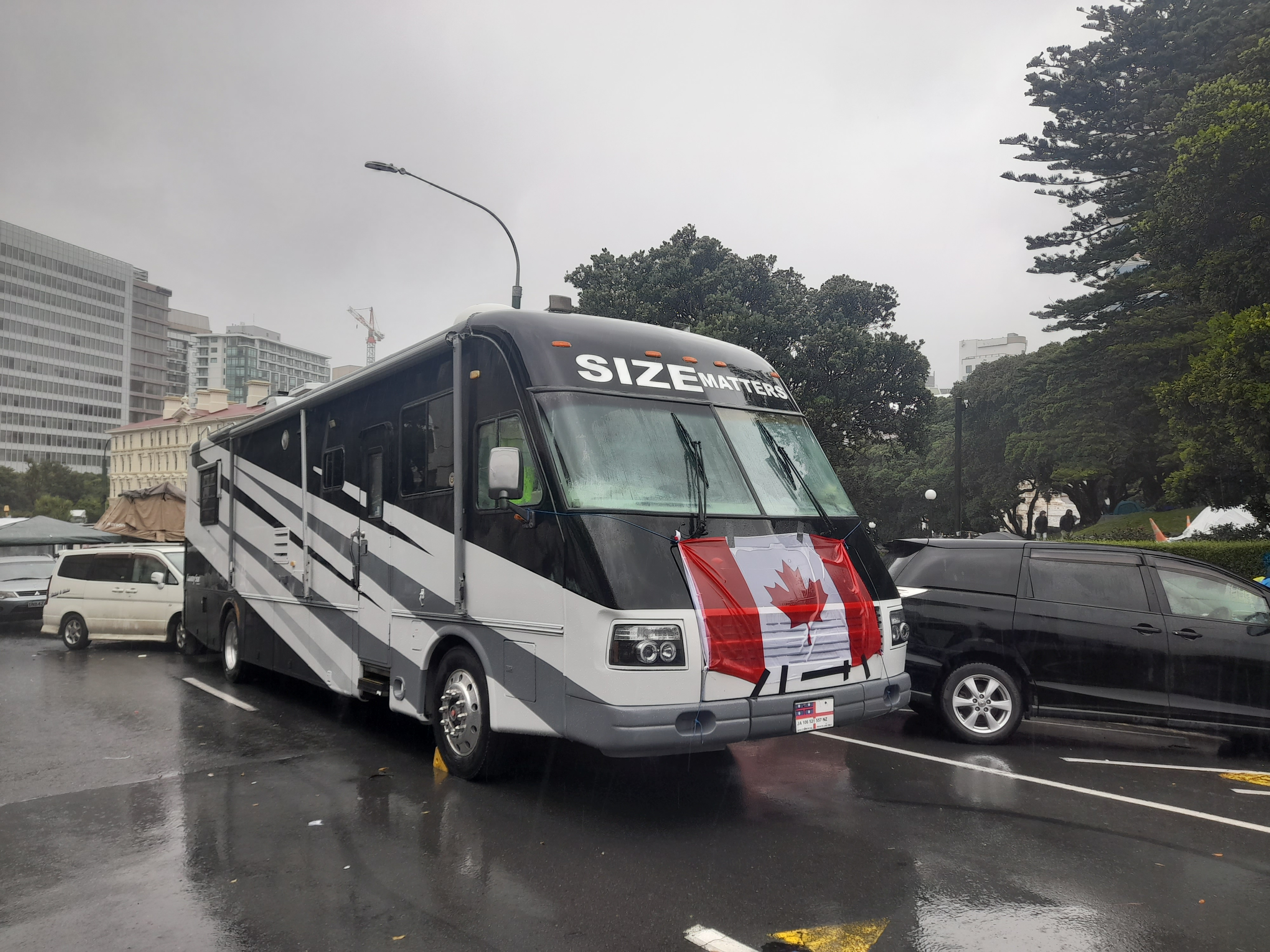
Canadian flags have featured in the protest to show solidarity with the protests in Canada that inspired Convoy 2022 NZ.

Vaccination became mandatory for all health and disability workers as well as in education, corrections, defence, Fire and Emergency New Zealand and police on 15 November 2021. New Zealand made the My Vaccine Pass available to all eligible New Zealanders on 17 November, and required all staff at close contact venues (gyms and hospitality) to be vaccinated by 17 January.

New Zealand has been praised for its success at controlling the spread of Covid, with its approach being regarded as the most successful in the world. Globally the country has high vaccination rates and one of the lowest per capita death rates. Most of the population have received the control measures well, with lockdowns and border closures often polling at more than 80% and their trust in scientists becoming the highest in the world.

The New Zealand protest was influenced by the Canada convoy protest that began on 22 January, when hundreds of vehicles blocked bridges at the border between Canada and the US, as well as streets in downtown Ottawa. Other nations were also influenced by the Canadian protest, holding their own rallies. The New Zealand protesters were mainly protesting against vaccine mandates, mask mandates and government lockdowns aimed at controlling the COVID-19 pandemic in New Zealand. It expanded to include a variety of anti-establishment goals characterised by mistrust of authorities, Government, media and police.

== Participants and agenda ==
In early February, about 100 people camped overnight at Parliament the first night and over the ensuing weeks, numbers peaked at about 3000. The protest was inspired by the truck convoy which occupied downtown Ottawa, Canada and several Wellington protesters carried Canadian flags in support. The Wellington protesters were a very diverse group consisting of "young, middle-aged and old, Māori, Pākehā (European New Zealanders), Asians, hippies, gang members, church groups, stoners, naked and clothed." At the start, convoy organisers had a fairly specific message: they wanted an end to vaccine mandates, repeal of COVID-19-related legislation and for anti-vaccination doctors suspended by the Medical Council to be reinstated. Elements of the Māori protest movement, such as the ahi kā (as seen recently in Ihumātao) were expressed by Māori with long-standing grievances against the Ministry of Health for its historical failures towards Māori. O'Brien and Huntington (2022) write that this messaging was soon co-opted by the Pākehā protestors, who constituted a majority, to justify the violent conspiratorial elements, such as the "antisemitic currents unconnected to vaccination issues" visible within the occupation.

On 21 February, David Farrar's Curia Market Research published the results of a poll surveying 312 protesters in Wellington between 19 and 20 February. In terms of origins, 41% of protesters came from provincial cities; 18.9% from towns, 7.7% from rural areas; 17% from Auckland; 8.7% from Wellington; and 6.7% in Christchurch. 55% of the protesters identified as female while 45% identified as male. In terms of ethnicity, 64.4% of protesters identified as Europeans; 27.2% as Māori; 4.2% as Asians, and 2.6% as Pasifika. In terms of voting patterns during the 2020 New Zealand general election, 29.8% of the protesters had voted for Labour; 15.9% for the Greens; 15.9% for National, 11.9% for ACT, 8.7% for the New Conservatives, 7.5% for Advance New Zealand; and 3.6% for the Māori Party. The survey found that 76.9% of protesters were unvaccinated; 4.8% had received one dose; 13.8% had received two doses; and that 2.9% had been triple boosted. The survey also found that most protesters were motivated by opposition to mandates, support for freedom of choice, concerns about children being vaccinated, and the loss of jobs.

There was no clear leadership within the protest group, with several groups and activists involved in organising the protest including anti-vaccination groups "Voices for Freedom" and New Zealand Doctors Speaking Out on Science (NZDSOS), conspiracy theorist Brett Power, far right media outlet Counterspin Media, Bishop Brian Tamaki's "The Freedoms & Rights Coalition" (TFRC), far right activist Kelvyn Alp, anti-vaccination activist Chantelle Baker, the right-wing New Conservative Party, and the neo-Nazi organisation Action Zealandia.

There were muddled messages with some protesters spreading vaccine misinformation, conspiracy theories, claiming media corruption, voicing Trump slogans and making death threats. Antisemitism was reported to be "rife" within the protests, with the Parliamentary grounds vandalised with swastikas, protesters misappropriating yellow stars, and messages targeting Jews written on car windows.

On 14 February, Groups within the protest, including Convoy 2022 NZ, Freedom Alliance, New Zealand Doctors Speaking Out with Science, Outdoors & Freedom Movement, The Freedoms & Rights Coalition, The Hood NZ and Voices for Freedom, issued a letter demanding an urgent meeting with Government ministers and the immediate removal of vaccine mandates and other COVID-19 response rules. The groups claimed that they were not just about anti-vaccination but more opposed to the Government's vaccine mandate.

== Timeline ==
=== First week ===
On 6 February, Waitangi Day, two convoys of vehicles travelled from Cape Reinga in the North Island and Bluff in the South Island to Wellington, departing at 6:30 am. The South Island convoy was led by Derek Broomhall. Opponents sought to disrupt the convoys' journeys by spreading disinformation about travel itineraries on the Convoy's Telegram and Zello channels. In addition, opponents also hacked into the Convoy's Spotify playlist and added songs deemed objectionable by the organisers, including Rebel Son's "Redneck Piece of White Trash," The Offspring's "Why Don't You Get a Job?", and Peaches' "Dumb F**k."

The presence of motorbikes, trucks, and cars created major traffic jams and disruption in the Wellington Central Business District. In response, Prime Minister Ardern and the Leader of the Opposition, Christopher Luxon, stated that they would not meet with the convoy participants. Despite convoy vehicles illegally blocking roads and occupying pedestrian areas, the Wellington City Council declined to issue infringement notices due to concerns over staff safety. Protesters erected tents and marquees on Parliament grounds, with at least 100 people camping overnight.

The next day protesters attempted to push through a fence outside Parliament but were stopped by police, who formed a ring around the entrance to the Parliament Buildings. Three men were arrested and issued with trespass notices. One of those arrested was the conspiracy theorist Brett Powers, who unsuccessfully attempted to arrest Minister of Health Andrew Little for alleged culpability in vaccine deaths. Police also issued orders for protesters to remove their tents and marquees from Parliament grounds. The attempt to breach the police line outside Parliament may have sparked tensions between the original organisers (who advocated calm) and Counterspin (who pushed for the storming of Parliament).

Police attempted to forcibly remove the protesters from Parliament grounds on 10 February. One hundred and twenty two protesters were arrested on charges of trespass and obstruction. About 27 protesters were held in custody overnight after refusing to sign their bail bonds. Following the failed attempt, 900 police officers in Wellington and 150 reinforcements were brought in from across the country. Protesters parked their vehicles the streets around Parliament, leading to the closure of several businesses and the National Library of New Zealand. The police began working with Wellington City Council parking wardens to issue infringement notices to the protesters' illegally parked vehicles and to prevent food trucks bringing food to the protesters.

Parliament grounds and surrounding areas on 12 February 2022

On 11 February, Parliament's garden sprinklers were turned on under orders by Trevor Mallard in a bid to deter protesters from Parliament and convince them to leave. Protesters then started to dig channels to direct water to nearby drains, causing the lawns to turn boggy and muddy. Wellington District Commander Superintendent Corrie Parnell said Molesworth Street remains blocked by over 100 vehicles, including large trucks, campervans and cars. No further arrests had been made that day. Mallard also had speakers set up to play Barry Manilow songs, the "Macarena", "Baby Shark," "My Heart Will Go On," "Let It Go," James Blunt's "You're Beautiful," and pro vaccination messages. Mallard was criticised by both the National and ACT parties for escalating the tension.

Convoy protesters remained at their makeshift camp despite heavy rain caused by the approaching Cyclone Dovi. Police maintained a presence near the camp while around 100 vehicles including large trucks, campervans and cars continued to occupy Molesworth Street. In addition, bales of hay were brought to mop up the water caused by the sprinklers. The camp maintained a festival-like atmosphere with chanting interspersed with music. In response, Ngāti Toa condemned the use of their haka Ka Mate at the protest. Police also evacuated a protester who experienced a medical emergency. Due to disruptions caused by the protest, Metlink removed all bus services from the Lambton Interchange and placed additional detours in place.

After the cyclone passed police attempted to unblock roads around Parliament but were unable to communicate with organisers. To reassure the public, police stepped up patrols around Molesworth street and other streets around the protest as well as the train station. Parnell also confirmed that the police were entering into discussions with the New Zealand Defence Force to unblock roads. There were reports of protesters who had been arrested earlier but had bail conditions to not return to the campsite flouting court orders. According to police, there were between 400 and 500 people remaining in tents, after reaching a peak of 3,000 people. Parnell confirmed that police were also working to restore the protest to a "lawful protest" by engaging with key leaders and moving vehicles to a staging area in order to reopen Wellington's streets.

=== Second week ===
Heading into the second week, Police Commissioner Andrew Coster said that police would give protesters the opportunity to voluntarily remove their vehicles but warned that time was "running out." The police entered into discussions with towing companies and the New Zealand Defence Force to remove the illegally parked vehicles. Police and the Wellington City Council offered protesters free parking at the nearby Sky Stadium, to try and clear roads of vehicles. Many protesters were suspicious of the offer, concerned that their vehicles would end up getting impounded if they did so. The next day only 40 vehicles had taken up the offer of free parking at Sky Stadium. The Defence Force was in discussions with the police over the type of assistance it could provide in removing vehicles. By 15 February 200 parking tickets had been issued but only one had been paid.

On 16 February 2022, far-right Action Zealandia member Max Newsome, who at the time was working as a construction crew member, posted a video and photos of the protest from Bowen House. His activities sparked an investigation by law enforcement authorities and prompted Speaker Mallard to restrict access to Bowen House.

The opposition National Party lodged a notice of a motion of no confidence in Speaker Mallard over his handling of the Convoy 2022 protesters on the 17th with National's COVID-19 spokesperson Chris Bishop criticising Mallard's decision to turn on the Parliamentary garden sprinklers and to subject the protesters to Barry Manilow music. The Wellington City Council confirmed that they had issued a total of 335 tickets to illegally parked vehicles in the Wellington CBD. Coster also announced that tow trucks would begin removing vehicles today and confirmed that police had appealed to the New Zealand Defence Force to assist with towing operations. Coster later ruled out "enforcement action" against protesters due to concerns that police action would lead to violence. Police also abandoned the ultimatum for protesters to remove their vehicles with Coster stating that the police would focus on "negotiation and de-escalation" for resolving the protest. The decision to rule out "enforcement action" was criticised by the National Party's police spokesman Mark Mitchell, who stated that Coster had lost credibility as Police Commissioner.

The number of protesters and tents at Parliament grew substantially over the second weekend, which provoked resentment from Wellington residents. One of the protest leaders requested former police and Defence Force personnel to provide security at the site. In response to perceived police inaction, Wellington mayoral candidate Tory Whanau proposed a "middle ground option" for police to enforce a perimeter around the protest to prevent it from spreading further into Thorndon and the CBD. Mayor Andy Foster subsequently confirmed that he was in talks with staff and the police on addressing the protesters' occupation of the Parliament grounds. Police began clearing up roads near Parliament on the 19th while contending with the illegally parked vehicles in the area. On 20 February, protest groups issued a joint statement expressing outrage at the arrests conducted the previous week and demanding that all charges be dropped. That same day, the police issued a statement that they would be boosting the policing of abusive protest behaviour, traffic management, road traffic controls, and street patrols to reassure local businesses and the public.

=== Third week ===
On the morning on 21 February, police began installing concrete barriers at eight locations around Parliament to reinforce the perimeter of the occupation. These barriers were designed to prevent more vehicles from joining the protests while allowing access for residents, businesses and emergency vehicles. 300 police officers were involved in this operation. Protesters responded by heckling and assaulting officers, with some officers being pelted with human feces. Police arrested seven protesters and also stepped up patrols in the CBD area. Protest leaders objected to the installation of the concrete barriers and claimed that it undermined efforts to build positive relations between police and protesters. Mayor Foster defended the barriers, arguing that they minimised the protest's disruption to Wellington. In response to rising community cases nationwide, Wellington Hospital's chief medical officer Dr John Tait advised protesters showing COVID-19 symptoms to return home or seek their community health providers.

Violence escalated on 22 February, when a car was driven at police by a protester and three officers sprayed with a mysterious substance by protesters. Foster and Paul Hunt (Chief Commissioner of the Human Rights Commission) met with protesters with the intention of using dialogue to resolve the protests and prevent further escalation of violence. Police and protesters continued to clash the next day after protesters removed at least one concrete bollard near the occupation site to let vehicles in. Protesters claimed that about 30 vehicles managed to return to the protest site from Sky Stadium. Earlier, police had warned that their offer of free parking for the protesters' vehicles would expire at the end of the day.

By 25 February, police confirmed that a total of 132 arrests had been made at Parliament. According to police, the number of vehicles at the Wellington protest site had dropped from 800 to 300 vehicles. Police also estimated that at least 30 children remain at the Wellington protest camp and confirmed they were working with Oranga Tamariki to ensure that children were at the forefront of their "planning and response decisions." That same day, 18 people sailed across the Cook Strait from Picton to participate in the Wellington protest. The Wellington protest camp was identified by the Ministry of Health as a "location of interest," potentially affecting hundreds who visited the site over the weekend. The Ministry of Health confirmed that hospitals across the country were reporting visits from people who had attended the Wellington anti-mandate protest before returning home. The Ministry described the Wellington protest as a potential superspreader event.

=== Fourth week ===
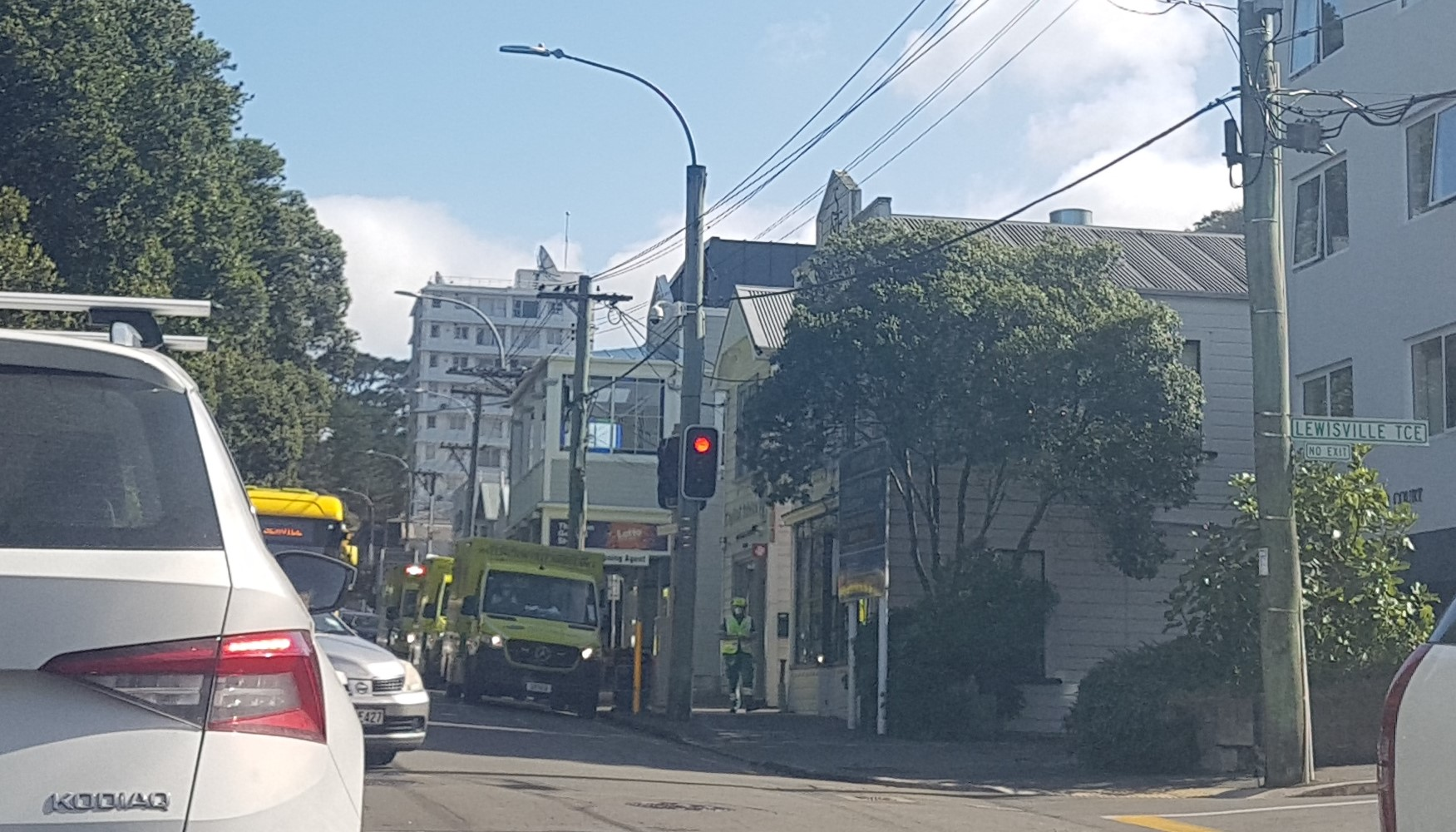
Ambulances standing by on Tinakori Road at 4.20pm on 2 March 2022

The mood of the protest had changed over the last week, with the more peaceful protesters being outnumbered by the more violent ones. On 2 March, police began the process of reclaiming the parliament grounds. They were able to regain control of a significant portion of parliamentary land after towing most of the illegally parked vehicles and launching an operation that led to the arrests of 38 protesters. Numerous protesters were sighted wielding pitchforks and plywood shields. Large fires also erupted on Parliamentary grounds. At least thirty of the protesters' vehicles were towed due to being illegally parked. The fires, set by protesters, resulted in the children's play area catching fire. By 4:38 pm, police had fully regained control of the parliament grounds, with the exception of a small area outside the front gate. During confrontations with the police, protesters smashed the glass doors to Victoria University of Wellington's Pipitea Campus (which is opposite parliament and was already occupied by protesters) and set fire to a bin on campus grounds.

By 6:29 pm, Parliament grounds had been cleared and 65 arrests had been made, with protesters engaging in what was considered a "final standoff" with police at the bus terminal on Lambton Quay. In response to the rioting near Parliament, Metlink closed the Wellington railway station and suspended all rail services. Police also advised people to avoid the central business district area near the Railway Station, Victoria University of Wellington's Pipitea campus, and the northern end of Lambton Quay.

According to Police Assistant Commissioner Richard Chambers, police arrested 89 people in relation to the riot on 2 March. On 3 March, 11 more people were arrested on various charges including arson, grievous bodily harm, inciting violence, theft, assault, trespass and obstruction.

== Protest site ==
The protesters set up a makeshift camp inside the parliaments grounds with the entire area covered in tents and gazebos. There was a first aid tent, a place to get free hair cuts, free clothing tent, tents for charging phones, and they organised their own security personnel.

A protester drew a swastika on a statue of Premier Richard John Seddon, while the Wellington Cenotaph was also defaced with graffiti and a shower was set up against its side. After a veterans personnel charity described it as "a slap in the face," the shower was dismantled and the graffiti was removed. Portable showers and toilets were constructed and illegally hooked up directly into the Wellington's wastewater system. This prompted officials to warning against swimming along Wellington's central waterfront due to raw sewage from the protest site entering stormwater drains that drain into the harbour.

There have been major concerns about sanitation issues at the camp due to the makeshift portaloos and human faeces present on the ground, especially given the presence of young children playing in the unhygienic conditions. Health experts expected high levels of respiratory and gastric diseases to run through the protesters, with immunologist Joanna Kirman saying that "These are individuals that aren't taking precautions. You are taking quite high-risk people and putting them together." Police officers have described the stench as excruciating, saying the "heat, mixed with excrement, body odour, and the lack of hygiene is really sickening to be around".

== Misinformation ==
The protesters made various claims largely based on misinformation and conspiracy theories, including the belief that natural immunity was more effective than vaccines. Many compared vaccinations to medical experimentation Nazi doctors performed in concentration camps during WWII, even fabricating their own evidence. Some believed New Zealand's political parties are involved in a plot to reduce the population using vaccines, describing vaccines as "a depopulation agenda". Others believe "Covid-19 was released deliberately, as part of a 'plandemic' to enable millionaires, pharmaceutical companies, and world leaders to control the global population."

Most protesters seemed to find mainstream media untrustworthy, putting their faith in alternative news outlets that broadcast through social media feeds. There were chants of "tell the truth", "media lies" and allegations that journalists covering the protest were paid government operatives. On Counterspin Media, far-right politician Kelvyn Alp called for journalists, politicians, academics and police to be put on trial for crimes against humanity. In frequent monologues on Counterspin, Alp regularly states his erroneous beliefs that the COVID-19 virus does not exist, and that vaccinations against COVID-19 are an attempted genocide.

The more bizarre conspiracy theories promoted by some protesters were that "EMF machines", "radiation machines" and "technological weapons" were being used by the government to make them sick, despite the spread of COVID-19 among the protesters. Videos were posted on social media asking for donations of tinfoil so they could be used for protection against such attacks. At the Wellington Cenotaph, nine speakers—installed in 2015 as part of Joe Sheehan's Walk the Line sculpture—were destroyed by protesters who mistook them as "some form of Government-run listening device[s]".

== Violence ==
The protest methods ranged from peaceful to increasingly violent. Signs and symbols inciting violence were common at the protest, but even more rife and obscene online. In a poll conducted internally on the protesters Telegram group 94% said all members of parliament and media should be charged with "crimes against humanity" and half voted for an uprising. There have been multiple threats by protesters to lynch politicians, such as Jacinda Ardern, Grant Robertson and pregnant MP Steph Lewis, through direct threats or by hanging nooses from trees on the grounds. One protester, Richard Sivell, was later convicted of threatening to kill Ardern. Evidence against Sivell included a video shared on Telegram, in which he said he was "quite happy to come down and construct some gallows".

Some protesters behaved aggressively towards police, members of the public, media, businesses, and school students including individuals wearing masks. Due to the aggressive conduct of the protesters, the Parliamentary Service, Victoria University of Wellington, the Ministry of Education, Ministry of Justice, the Department of Internal Affairs, and the Ministry of Health advised their personnel to avoid the area entirely. A 17-year-old girl was assaulted for wearing a mask by having eggs thrown at her. Queen Margaret College advised students and staff to take alternative routes to school after protesters had remonstrated and abused mask wearing children during the week. Kate Sheppard Apartments body corporate chairman complained that the presence of the protesters was making it difficult for local residents within the vicinity of the protest camp saying that several residents had moved out due to intimidation from the protesters and noise.

Antisemitism was reported to be "rife" within the protests, with the Parliamentary grounds vandalised with swastikas, protesters misappropriating yellow stars, and messages targeting Jews written on car windows. There were also several reports of sexual assault from within the protest grounds and fights breaking out between intoxicated campers. There are videos of protesters skirmishing with and attacking police, and also several instances of some of them harassing and physically assaulting schoolchildren for wearing masks.

Clashes with the police became increasingly violent. During the first wave of arrests two police injured and a naked female protester was dragged out of the protest by her hair. Protesters responded to the erection of barricades by heckling and assaulting officers, with some officers being pelted with human feces. On the morning of 22 February, a car was driven at police by a protester and three officers were sprayed with a mysterious substance by protesters, requiring immediate medical attention. Parademics had to treat several police officers who were spat upon by demonstrators.

The violence culminated into a full riot on 2 March when police moved in to shut down the protest. Protesters armed themselves with pitchforks, fire extinguishers and other homemade weapons. Pavers and other objects were ripped up and thrown at police. During the riot eighty seven people were arrested and around 40 police injured. As they lost ground protesters set fire to tents and a playground, while also attempting to burn down the Old Government Buildings. Protesters threw gas bottles, mattresses, rubbish bins and any other flammable items they could find to keep the fires blazing. Despite being urged by police to take their children home, some protesters were documented using them as shields against the police approach. By the end the build-up of rubbish, destroyed tents, hay, human excrement, and the after effects of the arson caused millions in damage to the grounds.

== Responses ==
Many Wellington residents gave the area a 'wide berth'. Some people had their masks ripped off their face by protesters. Local businesses reported the lunchtime rush disappeared entirely forcing some to shut down for the duration of the protest. Two schools, St Mary's College in Guildford Tce and Wellington Girls College in Pipitea St, closed down because of safety concerns for their staff and pupils. Local Iwi in Wellington including Ngāti Toa also stated their opposition to the protest, in particular to the aggressive behaviour by some protesters. They wanted a "political solution" to end the situation.

On 8 February, the Social Credit Party released a press statement advocating for an end to the government's vaccine mandate.

On 9 February, the New Conservative Party voiced support for the Convoy 2022 protesters' opposition to vaccine mandates and traffic light restrictions on social gatherings. The party also criticised Members of Parliament for allegedly ignoring their electors and trampling on people's rights. They called for a binding referendum to make the New Zealand Bill of Rights Act 1990 "supreme law."

New Zealand Outdoors Party co-leaders Sue Grey and Alan Simmons attended the protest, and on 10 February released a statement condemning the arrest of protesters.

On 18 February, 19 community leaders in Wellington issued a joint letter calling for the end of the Wellington Convoy protests. They complained about the harassment and intimidation of local residents, city workers, students, the disruption of traffic and local businesses and institutions caused by the protest and occupation. Notable signatories included Mayor of Wellington Andy Foster, Mayor of South Wairarapa Alex Beijen, Mayor of Porirua Anita Baker, Victoria University of Wellington Vice-Chancellor Grant Guildford, Green Party co-leader and List MP James Shaw, and Wellington Central Member of Parliament Grant Robertson with business represented by Chamber of Commerce Chief Executive Simon Arcus and others.

On 22 February, former Prime Minister Jim Bolger weighed in and said political leaders should "get off their high horses" and speak to the protesters. He was critical of Arden's stance to not engage with protesters and thought this was an error as speaking with protesters would nullify a key criticism held by the protesters in that nobody was listening to their concerns.

The protesters' demands to remove vaccine mandates were supported by New Conservative leader Leighton Baker, former Northland MP Matt King, New Zealand First leader Winston Peters, former Māori party leaders John Tamihere and Tariana Turia, National Party MP Harete Hipango, and musician Tiki Taane. Winston Peters also visited the protesters on 22 February unmasked. Former ACT leader Rodney Hide and former National Party MP Matt King also expressed support for the protesters' right to express their opposition to vaccine mandates.

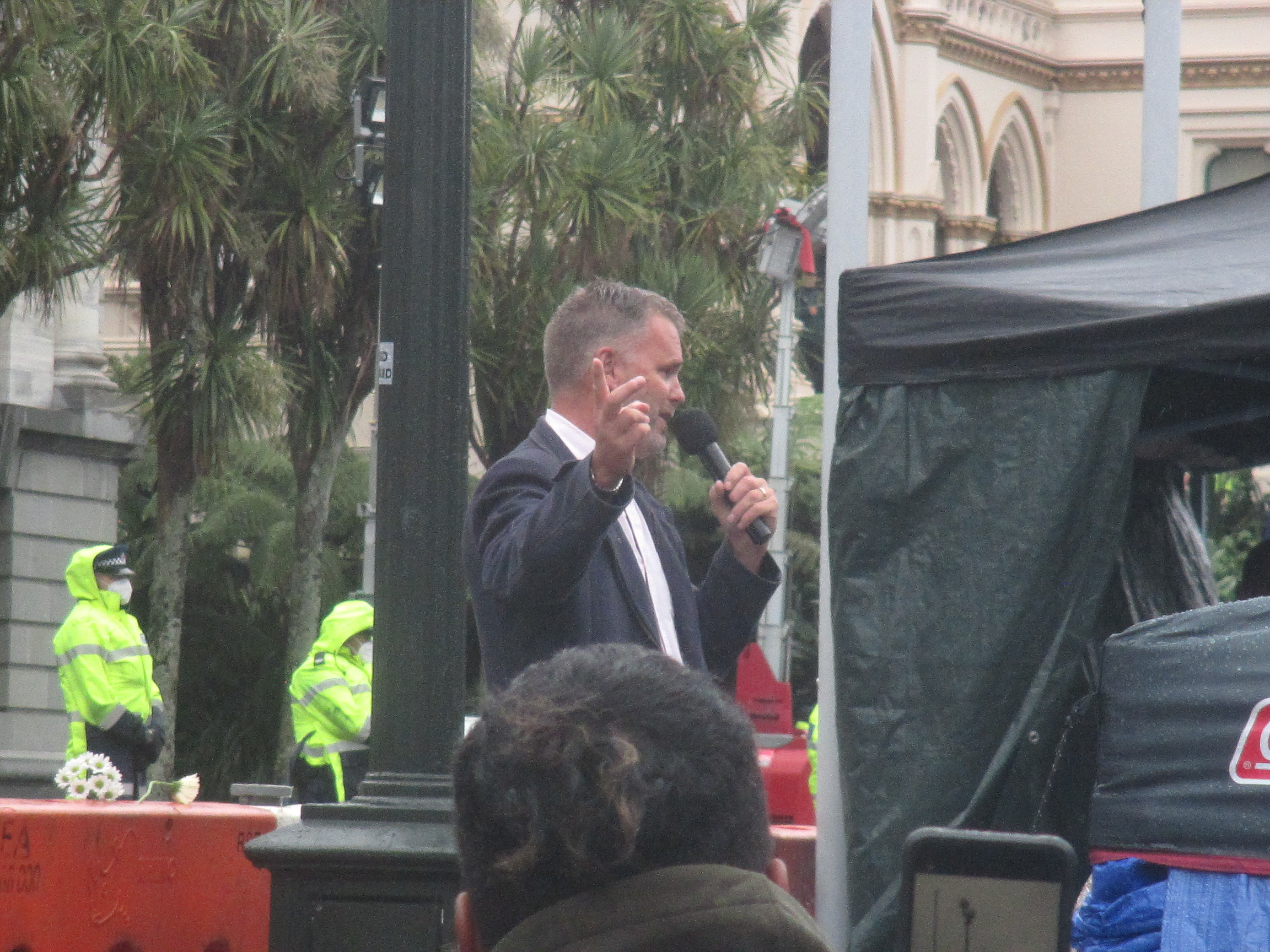
Matt King speaking at the anti-mandate occupation

The Māori king and iwi leaders denounced the protest, calling on those involved to "go home and stop abusing the environment, people and sacred sites".

=== Governmental ===
Speaker Trevor Mallard's decision to deter the protesters by turning on the parliamentary sprinklers and spotlights and play "earworm" music such as Macarena by Los Del Rio and Barry Manilow's back catalogue has been met with a mixed reactions, with both praise and disapproval for the levity of doing so. Although criticised as "childish" by opposition parties for his actions, Mallard consulted local residents before playing the music, to their approval.

On 9 February, Prime Minister Jacinda Ardern stated that the protesters did not represent the majority of New Zealanders, while COVID-19 Response Minister Chris Hipkins described the protest as embodying numerous issues and lacking clarity. Ardern said it was hard to converse with people about facts when they hold views that question everything.

On 12 February, Deputy Prime Minister Grant Robertson stated that protesters lost their right to protest when "they threaten, harass and disrupt people and a whole city." Robertson criticised protesters for intimidating school children wearing masks, blocking roads, disrupting emergency and transport services, and shutting down businesses. Robertson also objected to threats to arrest and execute him and other government ministers including Ardern.

=== Other political parties ===
On 9 February, National Party leader Christopher Luxon criticised the protesters for impinging on other people's freedoms by obstructing roads and travel, while the National Party's COVID-19 Response spokesperson Chris Bishop described the protesters as anti-vaxxers who denied the "fundamentals of science." Similarly, ACT Party leader David Seymour criticised the protesters for trespassing on public property, while expressing concern about the Government's COVID-19 restrictions. Seymour said: "It's possible to have a peaceful protest but I think what they're doing is far too intense. I think what they need to do is respect the law, respect people's basic property rights and not believe that because they disagree they have the right to trample over a whole lot of other people."

On 16 February, Seymour became the first leader of a political party in parliament to speak directly with protesters stating "There are some completely unacceptable elements of this protest. But there are also a lot of people out there who are reasonable, are not violent, and simply want to be heard."

=== Joint statement ===
However, on 17 February, ACT and the other four political parties represented in Parliament (namely the Labour, National, Green, and Māori parties) issued a joint statement stating that they would not talk to the convoy protesters unless they removed vehicles that were blockading Parliament, removed their tents and other structures, and ceased intimidating Wellingtonians. The statement was issued by Speaker Trevor Mallard in his capacity as the chair of the Parliamentary Service Commission.

A March 1News Kantar Public poll found 46% approved of the governments handling of the protest while 43% disapproved.

=== Police ===
Many within New Zealand expressed anger with the long time it took the police to restore order and end the harassment of the public by the protesters, or to send in the army to tow protesters' cars. Others criticised the police commissioner Andrew Coster for his lengthy focus on de-escalation, despite the protesters being highly decentralised and overwhelmingly unwilling to negotiate. Charlie Mitchell of Stuff wrote that "by standing aside, [the police had made] a confrontation inevitable [and] violent". There were additional calls for Coster to resign for his handling of the protests.

On 24 March, the Independent Police Conduct Authority (IPCA) announced it had received nearly 1,900 complaints about the way the police handled the protest and that it would undertake an investigation. Many of the complaints came from people who were not present at the protests.

On 28 June, The New Zealand Herald reported that over a third of the 2,309 police deployed to deal with the Wellington anti-mandate occupation had been referred to mental health support services to deal with emotional trauma encountered during the protest. According to information released under the Official Information Act 1982, 35 police staff were referred to psychologists while over 750 had been referred to wellness advisers by late May 2022.

On 29 June, documents released under the Official Information Act 1982 showed that the police had deployed two long-range acoustic devices (LRADs) during the forced removal of the anti-vaccine mandate protesters on the last day of their occupation of Parliament's grounds. LRADs are controversial since they can emit a sound level of 140 decibels, causing permanent hearing damage.

On 20 April 2023, the IPCA released its report into police actions during the Wellington Parliament protest. The report found that the majority of police "exercised professionalism and restraint" during the 23-day occupation and that all police defence measures such as shields, pepper sprays, and batons were justified. However, the IPCA identified several faults with the police response including insufficient protective gear, lack of preparation during the attempt to evict protesters on 10 February 2022, failing to uphold legal protections for some of those arrested on 10 February, the deployment of inexperienced trainee and graduate police personnel, inadequate evidence collection, and some isolated incidents of "potentially excessive force" by officers. Of the more than 1,900 complaints received, 1,100 dealt with the failed attempt at evicting protested on 10 February. In addition, the IPCA reviewed 1,300 hours of video footage. The IPCA also confirmed that it was investigating 19 incidents involving the police, with provisional findings showing police actions were unjustified on six occasions. The IPCA report found that some New Zealand laws relating to arrests and trespass were insufficient for policing mass-public disorder events.

The IPCA recommended that the police wear more body armour; develop detailed criteria for using protective equipment, batons, protective spray, and other tactical options; develop a communication strategy for communicating with disparate groups lacking a unified leadership; develop an operating procedure for the parliamentary precinct; work with partner agencies to review planning capacity; review police policies including logistics, personnel transport, intelligence products, training requirements, health and safety and command and control structure; and that Parliament review legislation regarding trespass, arrests, and property left behind by trespassers.

While Police Commissioner Coster, Police Minister Ginny Andersen, and the New Zealand Police Association welcomed the findings of the IPCA report, ACT party leader David Seymour called for disciplinary measures against rogue police officers and stated that police were put into an "impossible position" due to what he described as the Government's "divisive vaccine policy" and the "inflammatory" rhetoric of several Government MPs including Speaker Trevor Mallard and Michael Wood.

On 14 December 2023, the IPCA released its report into the 1,905 complaints related to the Parliament protest and occupation. The report confirmed six incidents of excessive force by police; with three cases being justified and two being deemed excessive. In addition, the IPCA determined that 19 incidents required further investigation or enquiries to be undertaken.

=== Litigation ===
In late June 2025, lawyer Tudor Clee sued the-then Speaker Trevor Mallard and Attorney Judith Collins on behalf of a child who participated in the 2022 Wellington protest on Parliament's grounds. The plaintiff has sought a declaration that their rights were breached when Mallard played repetitive "bad" music over loudspeakers as well as NZ$40,000 in damages for three separate breaches. These breaches included two breaches of the Bill of Rights' right not to be subject to torture or cruel treatment, the right to freedom of association, and a third tort claim alleging that a public official abused their power. The case is expected to be heard at the Wellington High Court on 7 July. In response, Mallard declined to comment on the case. A spokesperson for the Crown Law Office also confirmed that Collins was seeking legal advice on how to respond to the claim.

== Aftermath ==
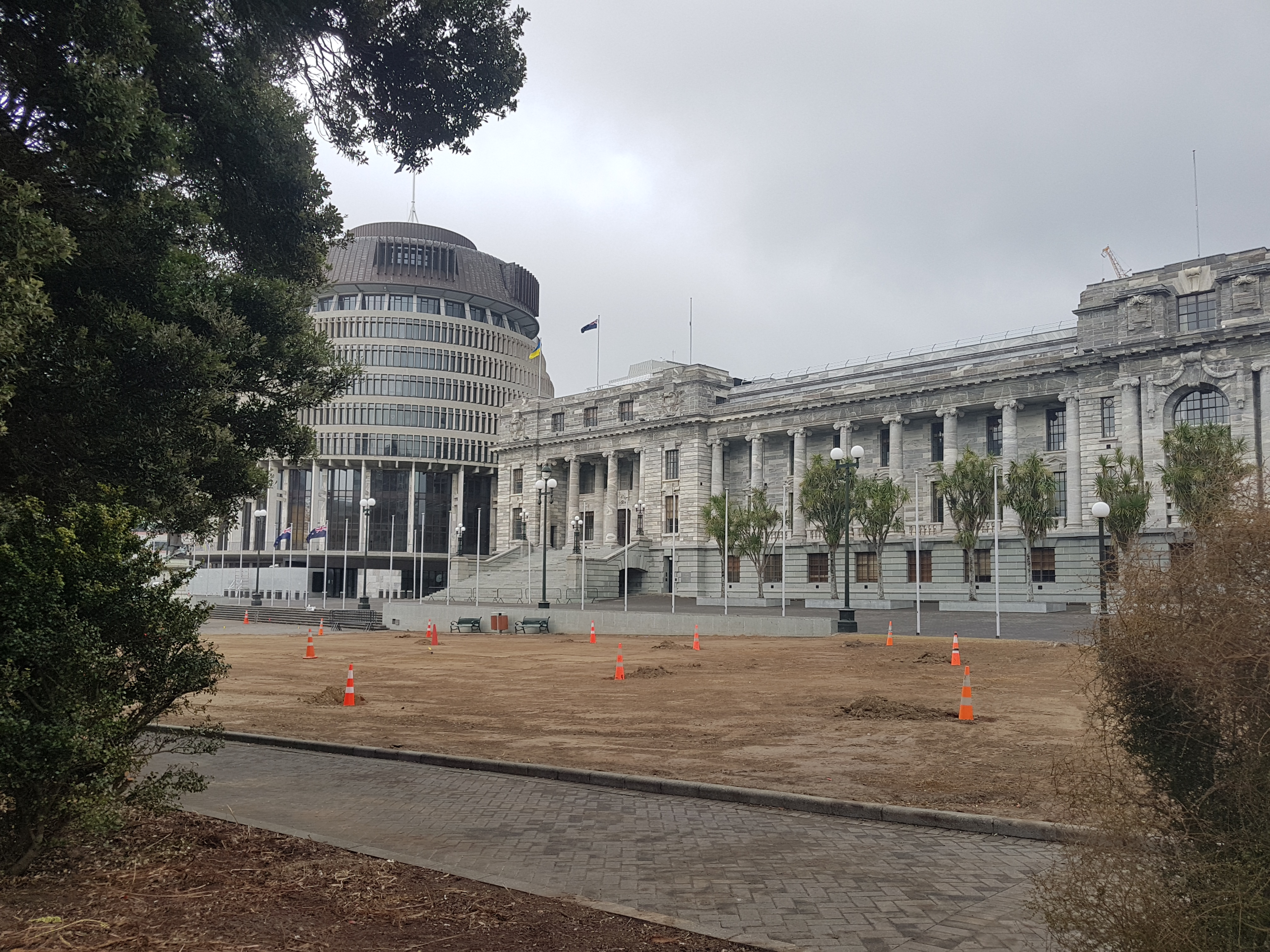
By 12 March the grounds turf had been removed

Following the dispersal of the Wellington anti-mandate protest, police launched a criminal investigation on 3 March 2022 focusing on identifying criminal offending relating to the protest and occupation. In addition, a crime scene was established around Parliament grounds and the surrounding area to enable forensic investigators to identify those responsible for the arsons and other crimes which occurred during the riot outside Parliament on 2 March.

On 9 March, the police destroyed camping equipment and personal belongings belonging to the Wellington protesters on the grounds that they had been contaminated by hay, dirt, and human waste. Police had removed these items during the police operation on 2 March to clear the Parliament ground of protesters. The confiscated belongings were inspected by health protection officers from the Porirua City Council for hazards. Police also launched investigations into the occupation's financial sources, with donations – further clouded by embezzlement accusations against an occupation participant – estimated to be in the tens of thousands of dollars.

Researchers analysing disinformation evaluated that the protest could act as a recruitment ground for extremists or far-right groups, with moderate protesters turning up being immersed in ideas promoted by the extremist groups that had infiltrated the protest.

On 3 May 2022, Winston Peters was trespassed from Parliament for two years by Mallard for visiting anti-vaccine mandate protesters. In response, Peters announced that he would seek a judicial review of the trespass notice. In addition, several other people including Matt King were issued with similar trespass notices. On 4 May, Mallard withdrew five of the trespass notices, including Peter's trespass notice, in response to the threat to seek a judicial review.

== Related protests ==
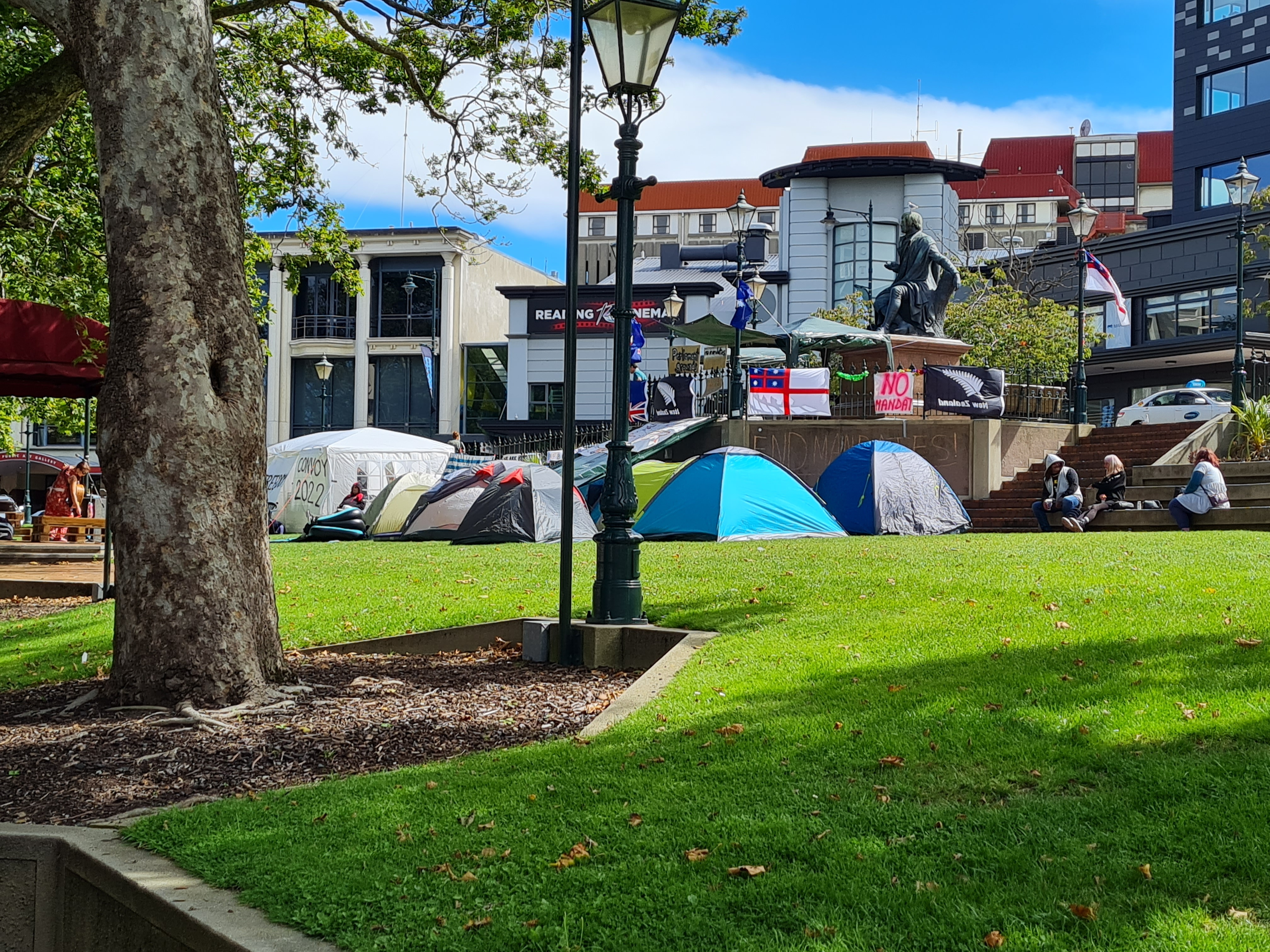
Tents set up in The Octagon, 16 February 2022

The Wellington Parliament protest and occupation inspired several smaller protests across New Zealand in Picton, Christchurch, and Auckland. As with the Wellington protest, these were organised via Telegram and Facebook. According to The Spinoff news website, a "NZ Convoy" channel on Telegram, that had taken part in organising the Wellington protest, renamed itself "Freedom Camp NZ" and began promoting plans to expand the protest nationwide in mid-February. The "Freedom Camp NZ" then spawned a second Telegram group to facilitate planning for each city and town in New Zealand. To facilitate these solidarity protest, a conversation thread was created for each major New Zealand city and town to coordinate the establishment of "Freedom Camps" at the local level.

=== Picton ===
On 9 February, solidarity protesters gathered in the upper South Island town of Picton. Unlike the Wellington protest, the Picton protest was largely peaceful, with local residents and businesses reporting minimal noise and disruption. Following discussions between the Marlborough District Council and protest leaders on 11 February, Freedom Convoy protesters agreed to relocate from Nelson Square to Waitohi Domain by 16 February.

On 16 February, protester organisers abandoned their earlier agreement with local authorities to vacate the site by 5pm and stated that they would remain until the Government's vaccine mandate was lifted. Camp coordinator Craig Tough urged protesters to ignore the Marlborough District Council's trespass notices. By that time, there were at least 150 vehicles including food trucks present at the site. Gang members were also present as well. In response, Mayor of Marlborough John Legett called on protesters to vacate the Nelson Square reserve and stated that the council would work with police to resolve the situation.

Following the police dispersal of the Wellington protest which had turned into a riot on 2 March, police warned the Picton protesters to leave the site. On 3 March, the Picton protesters agreed to vacate their camp site, citing the events in Wellington. Camp coordinator Craig Tough stated that "it was time to pack up and move on, but said the fight was far from over."

=== Dunedin ===
On 10 February, 60 protesters affiliated with the anti-vaccination group Voices for Freedom staged a solidarity protest near the Toitū Otago Settlers Museum in Dunedin. Other regular protests occurred daily in Queens Gardens.

On 12 February, another protest was held in The Octagon. Protesters camped on the site and announced that they would not leave until the Government lifted the country's vaccine mandates. Protesters set up ten tents and two marquees. Local police and the Dunedin City Council (DCC) monitored the protests to ensure that they did not cause trouble. On three separate occasions, Fire and Emergency New Zealand received three call-outs from the police, who had been alerted to fires lit in a brazier by members of the public. The Dunedin protesters were supported by former jailhouse lawyer Arthur William Taylor, who also served as their spokesperson and legal adviser. Taylor claimed that the Dunedin Octagon protest had contributed to a drop in the crime rate in Dunedin CBD area.

As of 10 March, the anti-mandate protesters remained camped in the Octagon. Mayor of Dunedin Aaron Hawkins and COVID-19 Response Minister Chris Hipkins urged the protesters to leave. The protest was mostly peaceful with local authorities monitoring the situation and liaising with organisers.

On 7 April, the Dunedin City Council issued a letter ordering the protesters to leave, stating that their occupation of the Octagon violated the Reserves Act 1977 and Dunedin's Reserves and Beaches Bylaw. Mayor Hawkins warned protesters to leave by 11 April or they would be formally trespassed. In addition, the Council switched off the supply of electricity to the Octagon Reserve and a private company took steps to remove a portable toilet after learning of the Council's intentions. A police spokesperson also confirmed that they were working with local council authorities and protesters to defuse the situation.

In response to the Council's letter, protesters have refused to leave until the Government has lifted all vaccine mandates including the one for healthcare workers and called for supporters to join them in solidarity. Taylor claimed that 70 supporters would be travelling from other cities and towns to support the Dunedin protesters. That same day, protesters verbally abused Mayor Hawkins while he was being interviewed by news broadcaster Newshub. On 8 April, an eight-year-old boy reportedly assaulted a contractor removing a portaloo that the protesters had been using.

On 11 April, protesters agreed to remove all their tents and structures prior to the 12 pm deadline. Protest organisers issued a Telegram message stating that they had made the decision to dissolve their "Freedom Camp" peacefully, ending their 60-day occupation of the Octagon. Protest supporter Taylor stated that the protesters' decision had been prompted by concerns about how authorities would respond but reiterated that they would continue their anti-vaccine mandate protest through other means. In response to the end of the Freedom Camp's occupation, Hawkins stated that the City Council would be assessing any damage to the Octagon Reserve. In mid-May, the Dunedin City Council confirmed that contractors had replaced the lawn in the upper Octagon, which amounted to total cost of NZ$12,264.65.

=== Christchurch ===
On 12 February, protesters staged a march to express solidarity with the Wellington Convoy participants.

On 14 February, a small group of protesters sent up tents in the city centre's Cranmer Square with representatives announcing that they would not leave until the Government had lifted the country's vaccine mandate. The Christchurch City Council confirmed that it was working with police to liaise with the protesters. Cranmer Square is classified as a reserve under Christchurch's by-laws.

On 19 February, a thousand protesters marched through the Christchurch CBD to the Bridge of Remembrance, demanding an end to vaccine mandate rules barring unvaccinated people from certain jobs and venues and objecting to the vaccination of children. Protesters disrupted traffic but police were not present at the protest.

On 8 March, Christchurch City Council staff and police met with protesters and issued them with instructions to remove the tents and camping equipment in Cranmer Square. The protesters agreed to take down these structures by the evening of 9 March. By that time, between 50 and 70 protesters remained camped at the site. On 9 March, the anti-vaccine mandate protesters vacated Cranmer Square, ending the three week occupation of the site. An organiser for the Christchurch protest stated that they had decided to leave peacefully in order to avoid a situation similar to the violent outcome of the Wellington protest. Following the withdrawal of the protesters, Council contractors replaced the lawn in Cranmer Square, which amounted to about NZ$70,000.

From 1 April, anti-vaccine mandate protesters set up camp on earthquake-damaged red-zone land near Burwood. The land is owned by Land Information New Zealand but managed by the Christchurch City Council. In response to complaints by local residents, the Council confirmed that it was liaising with protest leaders, the police, Fire and Emergency New Zealand, and social service agencies to ensure the safety of protesters.

=== Wānaka ===
In mid February, anti-vaccine mandate protesters occupied Wānaka's Ardmore Street for four days, leading to reports of disorderly conduct and complaints of intimidation from local businesses.

=== Auckland ===
On 27 February, Brian Tamaki's Freedom and Rights Coalition organised a protest march across the Auckland Harbour Bridge to Victoria Park. A group of protesters subsequently set up camp in the Auckland Domain. Police blocked roads to the Auckland Domain to prevent more people from joining while the Auckland Council issued by-law breach notices ordering the campers to leave. Their presence was also opposed by the mana whenua Ngāti Whātua, who issued demands that they leave their rohe. An iwi spokesman said of the protests: "We're unequivocal: We are the tangata whenua of Central Auckland and of that site, Pukekaroa and Waikohanga." Despite protesters initially claiming they were "not going anywhere", they accepted a second Ppolice request to leave on 3 March, the day after the police evicted the anti-mandate protesters at Parliament. Police and Auckland Council officials helped the protesters to remove their tents and camping equipment.

In addition to the Auckland Domain protest, the Telegram influencer Karen Brewer attempted to organise protests outside the Governor-General's official residences in Wellington and Auckland. Her goal was to get Governor-General Cindy Kiro to dissolve Parliament and issue a writ for a new election.

=== Invercargill ===
On 2 March, anti-mandate protesters set up a "freedom camp" outside Queens Park on Gala Street. They erected eight large tents, around four or five smaller tents, a van, a portaloo and a marquee on the reserve. The protest attracted at least 40 people. In response to the "freedom camp," the Invercargill City Council stated that they were monitoring the situation and working with police. The protest ended on 10 March.

=== Wellington region ===
Following the dispersal of the Parliament camp in early March 2022, anti-mandate protesters set up camp in the Ngāti Toa Domain, Motukaraka Point, Bradey's Bay and Onepoto Esplanade Reserve. In response, the Porirua City Council closed off access to camping sites in those areas. Several of the Wellington anti-mandate protesters subsequently set up camp at various locations in the Miramar Peninsula including Mahanga Bay, which attracted between 25 and 30 vehicles and a couple of tents.

By 11 April 100 protesters had set up tents and a house truck in Mahanga Bay. Since the camping site lacked toilet facilities and waste collection, Wellington Councillor Teri O'Neill expressed concern that the protesters were harming the natural environment. In May 2022, National Institute of Water and Atmospheric Research (NIWA) and Land Information New Zealand (LINZ) issued trespass notices to the protesters occupying the camp site. On 30 June, police evicted the 15 remaining occupants at the camp site, which also included individuals who were calling for the return of the land to Māori. Some of these individuals were also homeless. The Wellington City Council began working with police and social services to help resettle homeless individuals. In addition, City Council, police, NIWA, and LINZ personnel began work to clean the campsite.

== Legacy ==
On 15 August 2022, Stuff released a documentary on the Wellington protest as part of its Circuit documentary series entitled Fire and Fury. The documentary looked at several key figures and groups involved in the protest including Counterspin Media hosts Kelvyn Alp and Hannah Spierer, Voices for Freedom leaders Claire Deeks, Alia Bland, and Libby Jonson, social media influencer Chantelle Baker, "Sovereign Hīkoi of Truth" leader Carlene Hereora, QAnon conspiracy theorist Damien de Ment and controversial former Auckland University of Technology (AUT) law professor Amy Benjamin. Fire and Fury focused on how these figures and groups used social media and the Internet to organise the protests and spread disinformation about COVID-19 and against the media and New Zealand Government. While Fire and Fury utilised these figures and groups' videos, social media posts, and media coverage, the documentary did not interview any of them to avoid giving them a platform.

According to the documentary's producer and journalist Paula Penfold, the production team had originally called the documentary The Inciters but had settled on Fire and Fury since the film looked at "those pulling the strings, rather than the freedom movement as a whole." In response, several of the aforementioned groups and individuals including deMent, Counterspin Media and Voices for Freedom claimed that Fire and Fury promoted deception but bolstered their support and causes. Broadcaster Sean Plunket's online radio station The Platform also hosted Baker, Alp and Voices for Freedom to "share their side of the story" in response to the documentary.

On 1 November, public broadcaster TVNZ released a documentary called Web of Chaos which looked at the Wellington Parliament protest within the framework of disinformation, conspiracy theories, and far right activism in New Zealand. The documentary was directed by Justin Pemberton and featured investigative journalist David Farrier and academics Sanjana Hattotuwa and Kate Hannah of The Disinformation Project.

In early December 2022, the film studio Heanna Gajin and protest leader Chantelle Baker's Operation People media outfit released a documentary called We Came Here For Freedom Part I focusing on the events of the Wellington Parliament protest from the perspective of the protesters. The documentary was written and directed by Alistair Harding. The second part was released on 1 July 2023.

On 2 March 2023, public broadcaster Radio New Zealand released a documentary called Boiling Point to mark the first anniversary of the eviction of the Parliament protest. The documentary was produced by RNZ Morning Report host Corin Dann and featured previously unreleased footage of the final day of the protest.

In early September 2023, independent filmmakers premiered the feature documentary River of Freedom at The Civic in Auckland to an audience of 1200. This film offers a perspective from the point of view of the protesters. It had a 10-week cinema release on limited screens, reaching the top ten in the New Zealand box office in the first few weeks. It was the most successful theatrical release in 2023 of a New Zealand-made feature documentary. According to Box Office Mojo, the film is in the top 100 of the New Zealand box office at #82, along with two other New Zealand-made dramas, Red, White & Brass (#25) and Uproar (#44). It received only one published review from legacy media outlet Stuff, entitled: "You don't have to agree with River of Freedom, but you might need to see it". The reviewer, Graeme Tuckett of Stuff, also included the documentary in his top ten films of the year. Tuckett states that the film "is a view from inside the protest looking out" and offers a "counter-balance" to media coverage. The film was directed by Gaylene Barnes and produced by Jared Connon. In December 2023, River of Freedom was picked up for international distribution by Journeyman Pictures, becoming one of their top-sellers for 2023.

A book based on the film River of Freedom has been written about the convoy and Wellington protest. Heart of the Protest (2026) is co-authored by Siân Clement and director Gaylene Barnes.

== See also ==
- COVID-19 pandemic in New Zealand
- COVID-19 anti-lockdown protests in New Zealand
- Timeline of the COVID-19 pandemic in New Zealand
- My Vaccine Pass
- Canada convoy protest
- Convoy to Canberra
