= Wellington Cenotaph =

War memorial in Wellington, New Zealand

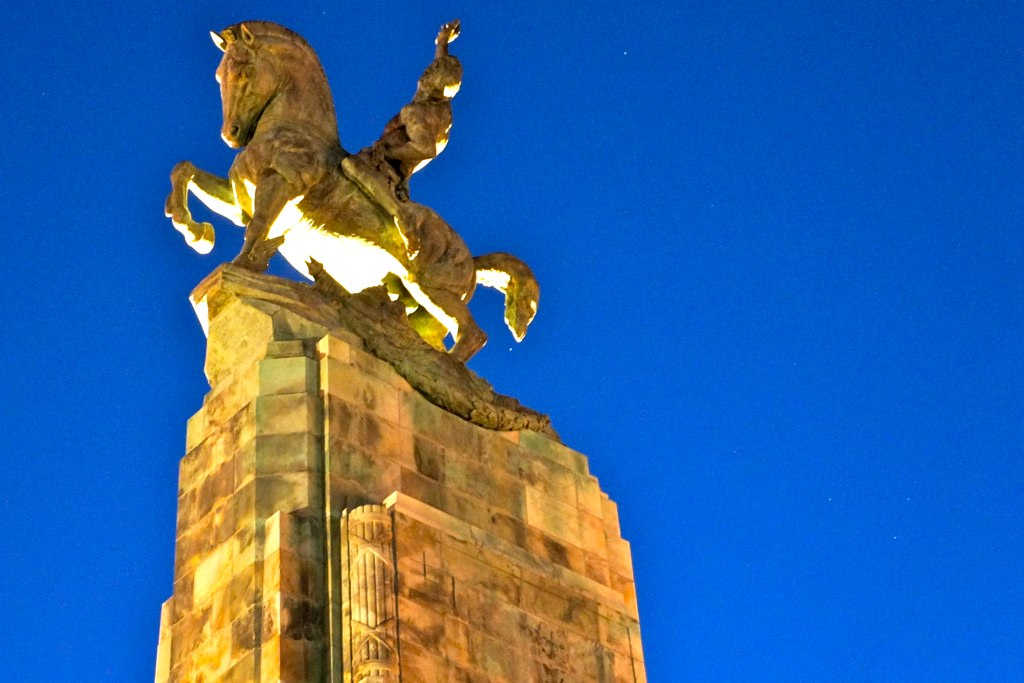
- Wellington Cenotaph
- Interactive map of Wellington Cenotaph
- Location: Lambton Quay and Bowen Street, Wellington, New Zealand
- Coordinates: 41°16′45″S 174°46′38″E
- Designer: Richard Gross
- Completion date: 1931
- Opening date: Anzac Day (25 April) 1931

Heritage New Zealand – Category 1
- Official name: Wellington Cenotaph
- Designated: 3 March 1982
- Reference no.: 215

The Wellington Cenotaph, also known as the Wellington Citizens' War Memorial, is a war memorial located on the intersection of Lambton Quay and Bowen Street in Wellington, New Zealand. It commemorates the war dead of the two world wars. The cenotaph is listed as a Category 1 Historic Place by Heritage New Zealand and it is the city's focus for the annual Anzac Day commemorations.

== History ==
The Wellington Cenotaph precinct was the site of New Zealand's first public library which opened in 1841. The Wellington Cenotaph was unveiled on Anzac Day (25 April) 1931 to commemorate the New Zealand dead of World War I. Before that a temporary cenotaph was used to commemorate Anzac Day until funds were raised for a permanent memorial and a decision made on the site.

The cenotaph was designed by sculptor Richard Gross and Auckland architects Grierson, Aimer and Draffin. Built of Carrara marble and Coromandel granite it features two wings decorated with relief sculptures and the central cenotaph is topped with a bronze figure on horseback. Two bronze lions and a series of bronze friezes were later added in commemoration of World War II.

A small chapel is located inside the cenotaph. It is not open to the public.

The official dedication took place on 17 April 1932 by Bishop Sprott, the Anglican Bishop of Wellington. The souvenir programme for the official dedication says the mounted figure was entitled 'The Will to Peace', and is described thus:

Pegasus spurning underfoot the victor's spoils of war and rising into the heavens, enabl[ing] his rider to emerge from the deluge of blood and tears, and to receive the great spiritual assurance of peace.

On 18 March 1982, it was registered as a Category 1 Historic Place with registration number 215.

On 2 September 2013, new plans for the cenotaph were presented including a new staircase and water feature up to the Parliament Buildings. The works also include repairs to the cenotaph surface materials and creation of a square to create a ceremonial space.

As part of the redevelopment the Wellington Sculpture Trust commissioned Joe Sheehan to install Walk the Line, a line of 231 nephrite discs tracing the line of the Waipiro Stream. The stream which is now in a culvert originally flowed down Bowen St across the cenotaph precinct to the foreshore. Accompanying the installation is a recording of the sound of flowing water from speakers below the ground. The water sounds were recorded on Te Ahumairangi Hill whose streams feed into Waipiro Stream.

In 2015 the Wellington Anzac Day citizen's wreath-laying ceremony was held at the upgraded cenotaph.

In 2025 the City Council began a three year programme of restoration work of the cenotaph.

== Image gallery ==
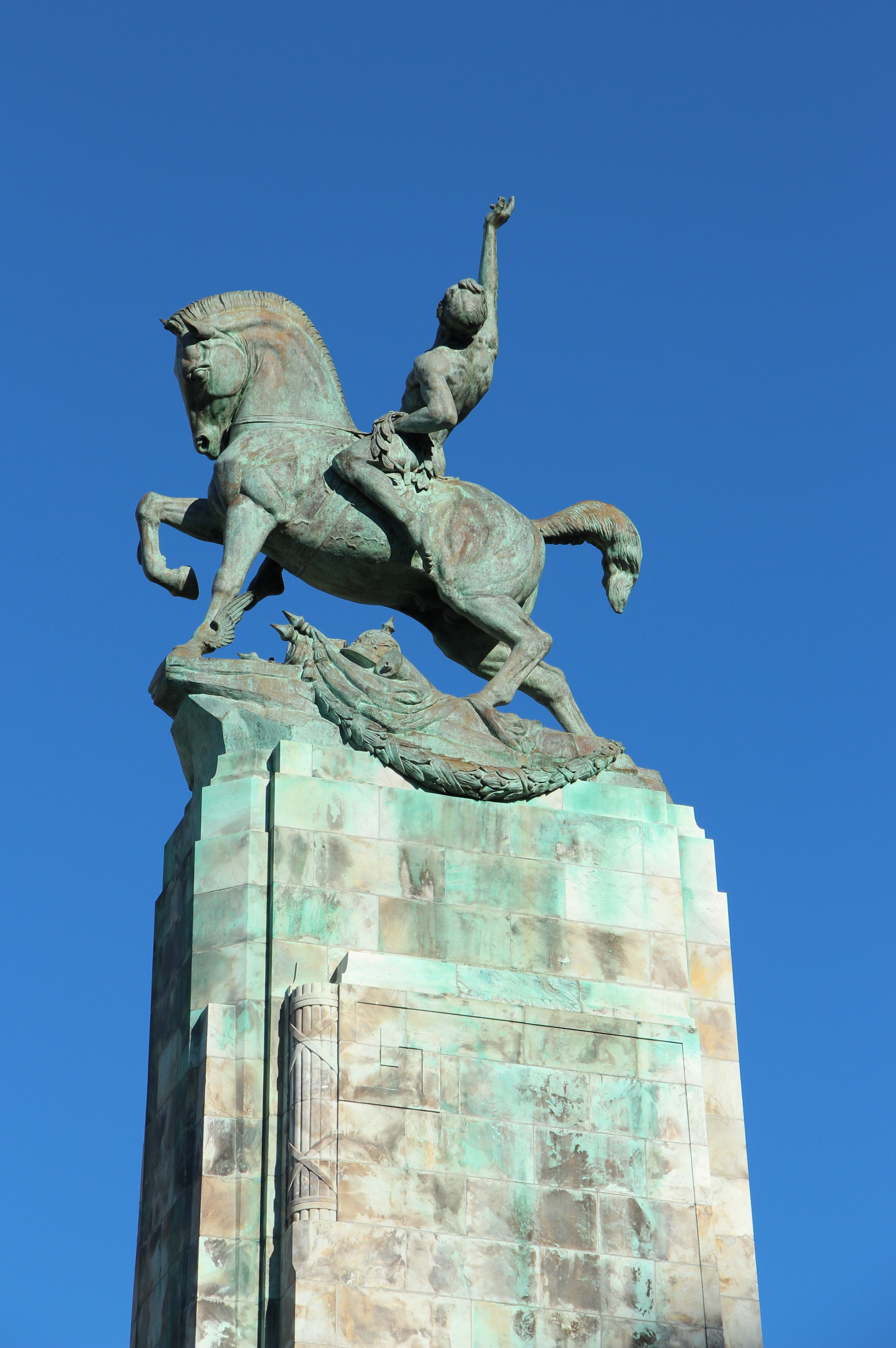
Detail of the mounted figure, described above

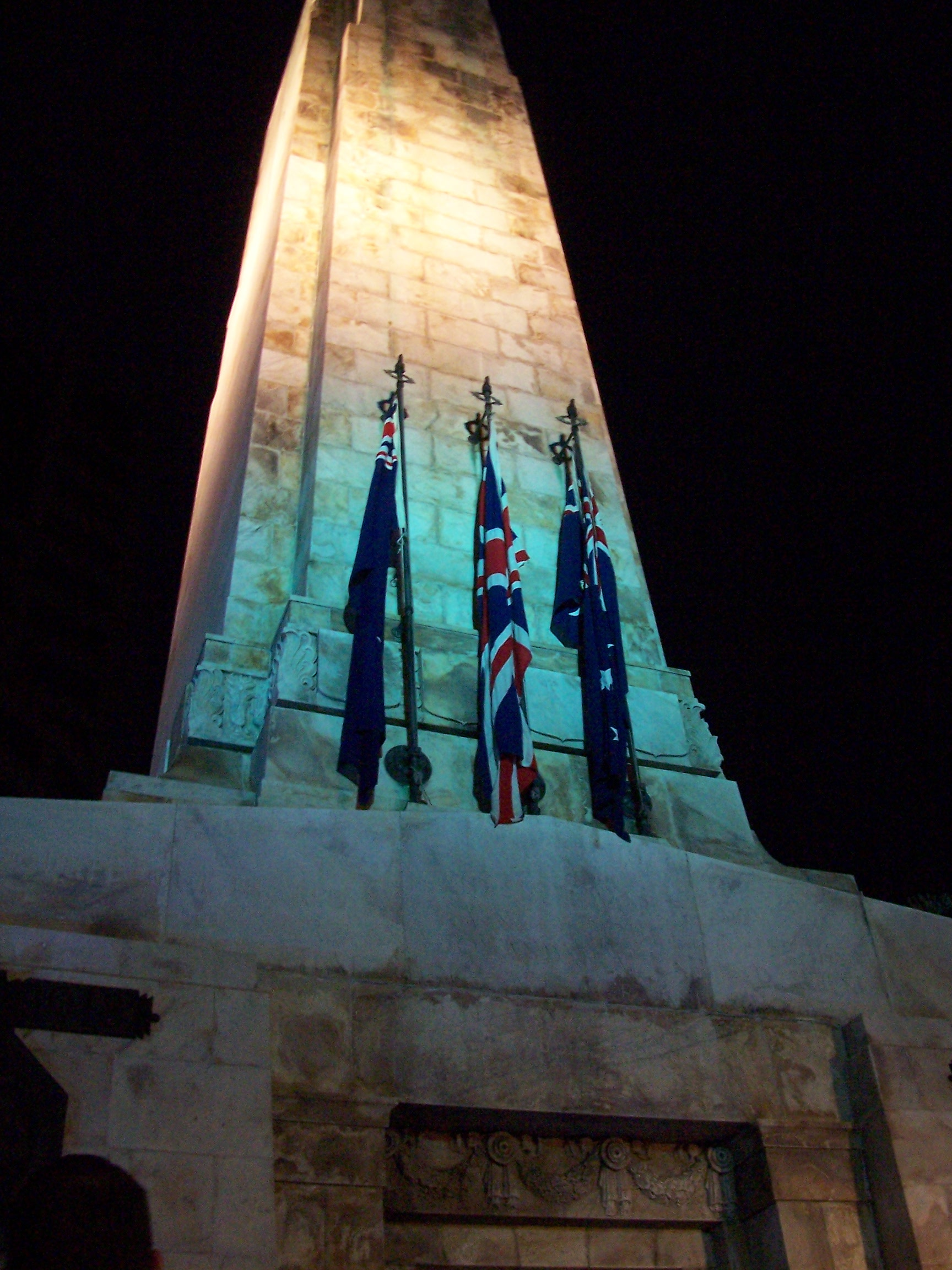
The cenotaph just before dawn on Anzac Day 2007

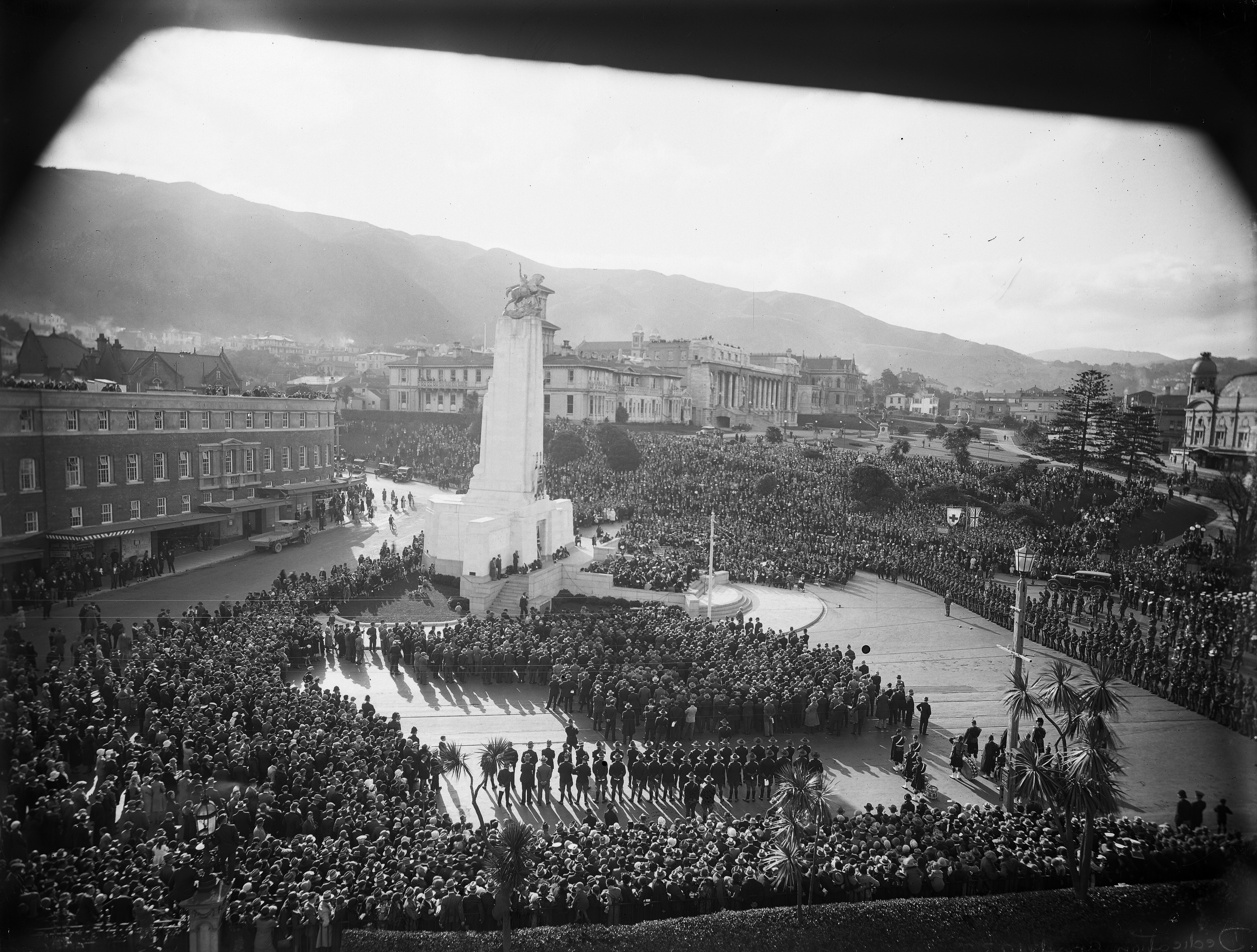
Crowd surrounding the cenotaph at the dedication ceremony in 1932

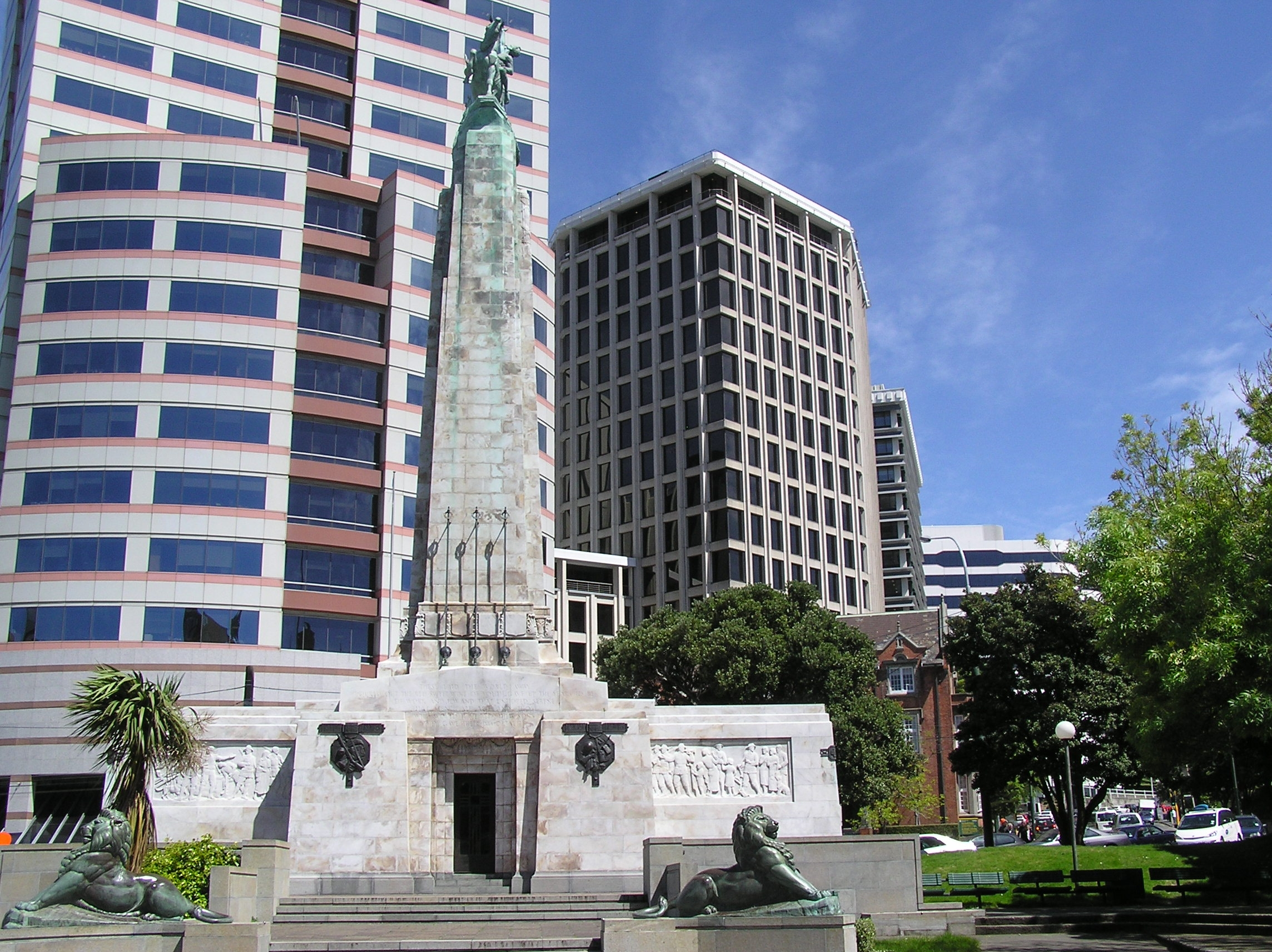
Full view of the Wellington Cenotaph (with Bowen House in the background)

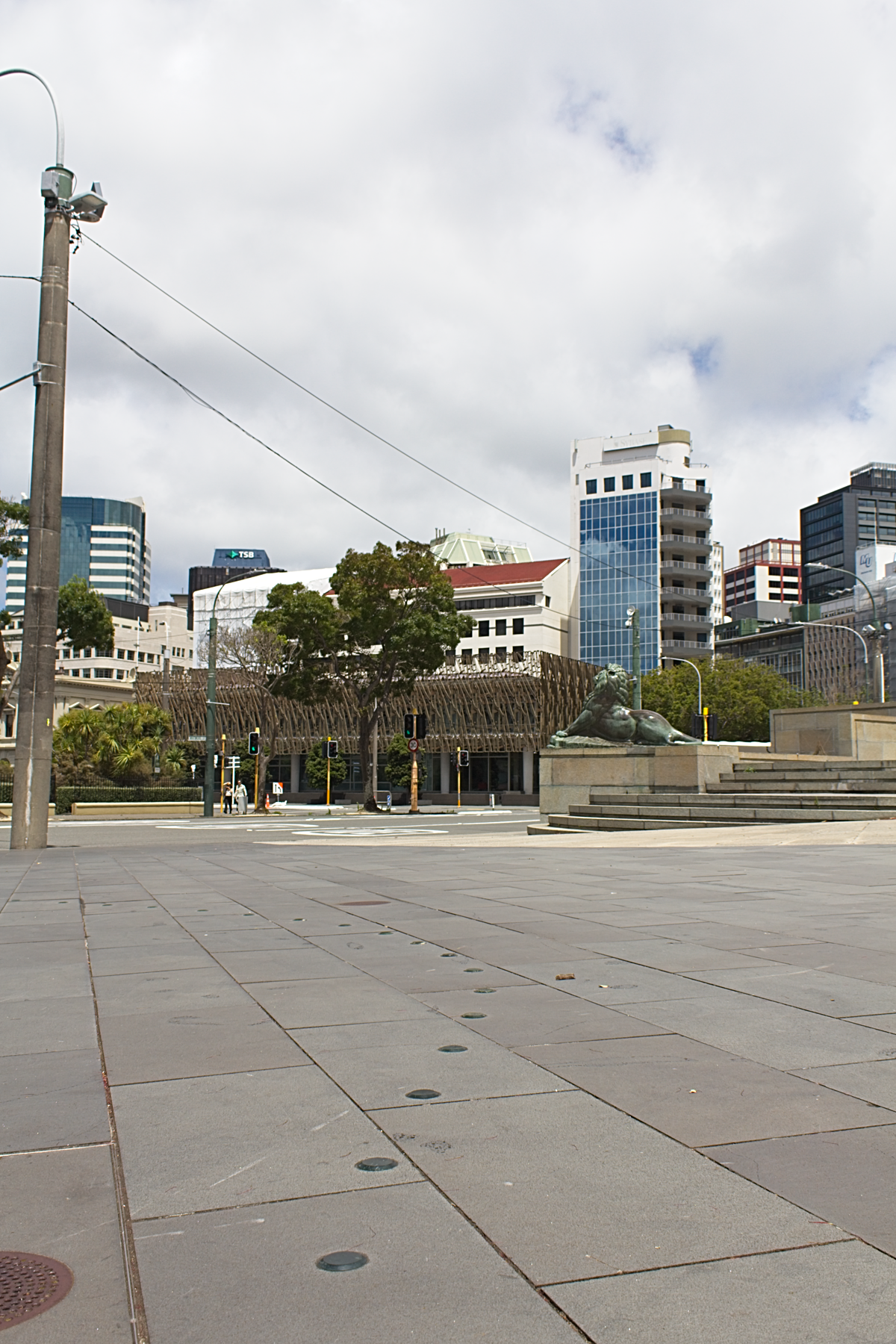
Walk the Line by Joe Sheehan

The chapel inside the cenotaph
