= Joe Sheehan (artist) =

New Zealand artist and jeweller (born 1976)

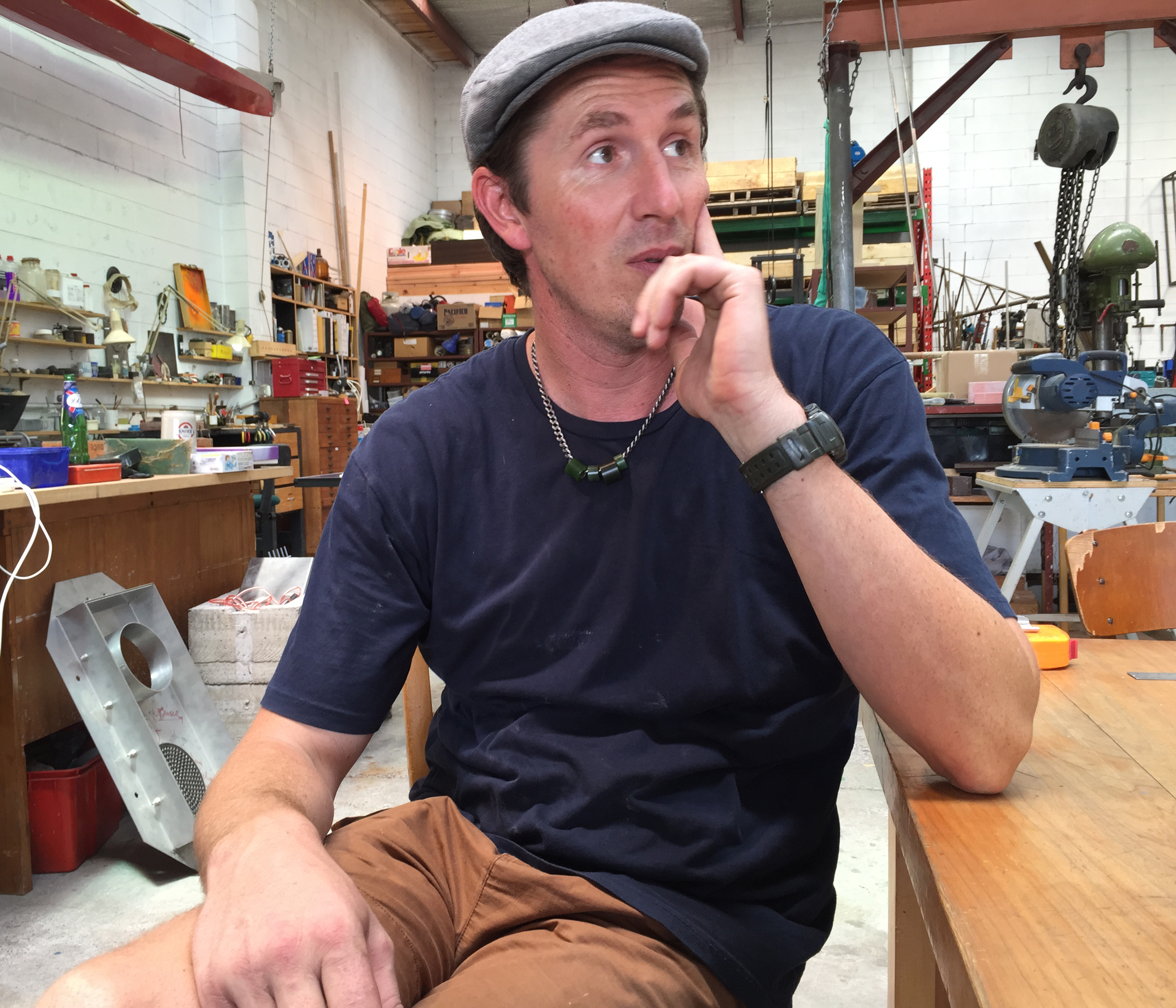
- Joe Sheehan in his studio, 2015
- Born: 1976 (age 49–50)
- Education: 1996 Diploma in Design (Jewellery) Unitec Institute of Technology
- Known for: Jewellery and sculpture
- Awards: 2011 Antarctic Fellow: Artists in Antarctica Programme

Joe Sheehan (born 1976 in Nelson, New Zealand) is a stone artist and jeweller who works primarily in pounamu (New Zealand greenstone or jade).

== Early life and education ==
Sheehan has been carving since his early teens. His father is an American jade carver who emigrated to Nelson in the 1970s. Sheehan worked in his father's business, which supplied jade carvings to the tourism market in Rotorua.

Sheehan studied contemporary jewellery at the Unitec Institute of Technology, where his tutors included Pauline Bern, graduating with a Diploma in Design (Jewellery) in 1996.

== Career ==
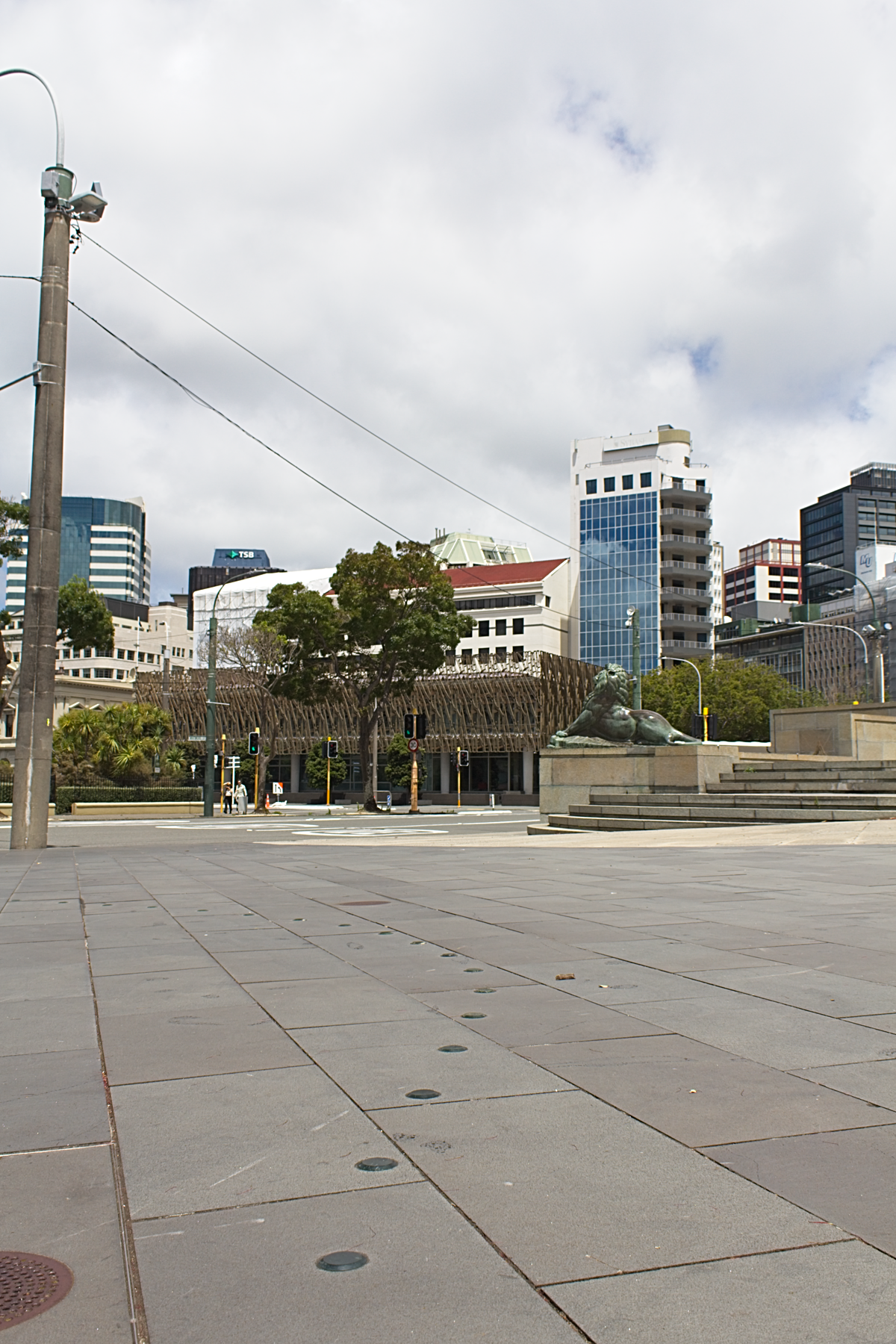
Walk the Line

Sheehan works with pounamu, which is a material of great significance in Māori culture. Some of Sheehan's works explore "the value placed on pounamu as a commodity, rather than a material of cultural importance". In others he uses pounamu in unexpected ways, for example carving ballpoint pens, a tape cassette, or a lightbulb. Sheehan has also made works that question New Zealand's 'clean, green' image. He says 'A lot of contemporary carving is retrospective looking. I wanted my stuff to relate to the current social environment but also reference the particular way our carving industry has developed'.

Limelight, his second exhibition, was a solo show at Objectspace in 2005, following a solo show at Avid Gallery in Wellington the previous year. In 2006 Sheehan was one of the Arts Foundation of New Zealand's inaugural New Generation Awards recipients. In 2008 he was selected to participate in the 28th São Paulo Art Biennial; in 2011 he travelled to Antarctica as an Antarctic Arts Fellow under the Artists in Antarctica Programme. In 2012 he had his first survey exhibition, 'Joe Sheehan: Other Stories', at Pataka Art + Museum in Porirua, New Zealand.

Sheehan was commissioned by the Wellington Sculpture Trust to produce Walk the Line, a site-specific sculpture, for the refurbishment of the Wellington cenotaph. Sheehan carved over 300 nephrite discs that travel across the space, marking the original bed of the Wai Piro Stream.

== Collections ==
Sheehan's work is held in a number of public collections, including the Victoria and Albert Museum, Christchurch Art Gallery, the Museum of New Zealand Te Papa Tongarewa and the Chartwell Collection at the Auckland Art Gallery.
