= Wellington Sculpture Trust =

New Zealand trust promoting public sculpture

The Wellington Sculpture Trust is an independent charitable trust which funds and advocates for public sculptures in Wellington, New Zealand. It is funded by private and corporate donations and works with the Wellington City Council. It has commissioned and bought sculptures sited in the Botanic Garden, Cobham Drive at the head of Evans Bay in Rongotai, the Wellington waterfront and Lambton Quay in the central city.

== History ==
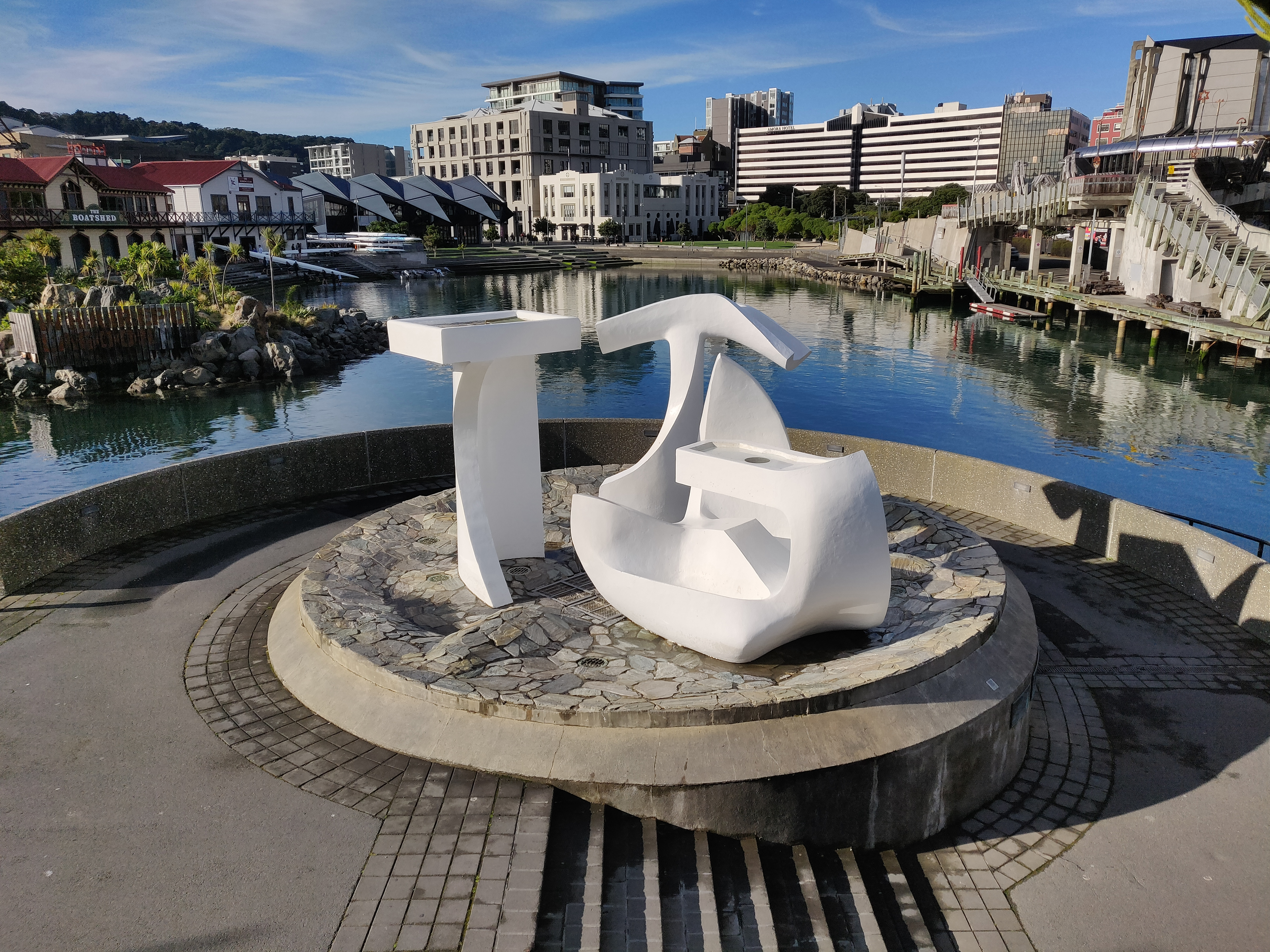
Albatross by Tanya Ashken

In 1982 funds were needed to install Albatross a statue on the waterfront by Tanya Ashken. The Wellington City Council had agreed to a site on the waterfront but funding for the sculpture had to be found. After the initial fundraising for Albatross Henry Lang and Dr Ian Prior formed the Trust in 1983 to advocate for public sculptures and provide financial support. During the demolition and rebuilding which occurred in Wellington city in the 1980s the Trust saw that public sculptures would enhance cultural and spiritual values as the city was redeveloped.

The trust is funded by private citizens, businesses and other bodies. It works in partnership with the Wellington City Council. It has had a partnership with Meridian Energy to create the Meridian Energy Wellington Wind Sculptures on Cobham Drive and the Griffin Charitable Trust for the Lambton Quay works.

In 2002–2003 the trust organised a Lambton Quay Sculpture Competition which resulted in several sculptures in the city centre: Spinning Top by Robert Jahnke, Invisible City by Anton Parsons, Shells by Jeff Thomson and Protoplasm by Phil Price.

In 2007, the then chairperson Neil Plimmer confirmed that they had installed 19 public sculptures since 1982.

Sue Elliott became chairperson in 2013. Since 2014, the trust has organised PARK(ing) Day, an annual event in which parking spaces in Cuba Street have been taken over by a variety of artists and others to examine how public spaces are used.

The Trust has commissioned two sculptures: Ferns in 1998 by Neil Dawson and Kimi/You are Here by Seung Yul Oh in 2025. Kimi/You are Here is the thirtieth work commissioned by the Trust.

== Selected sculptures ==
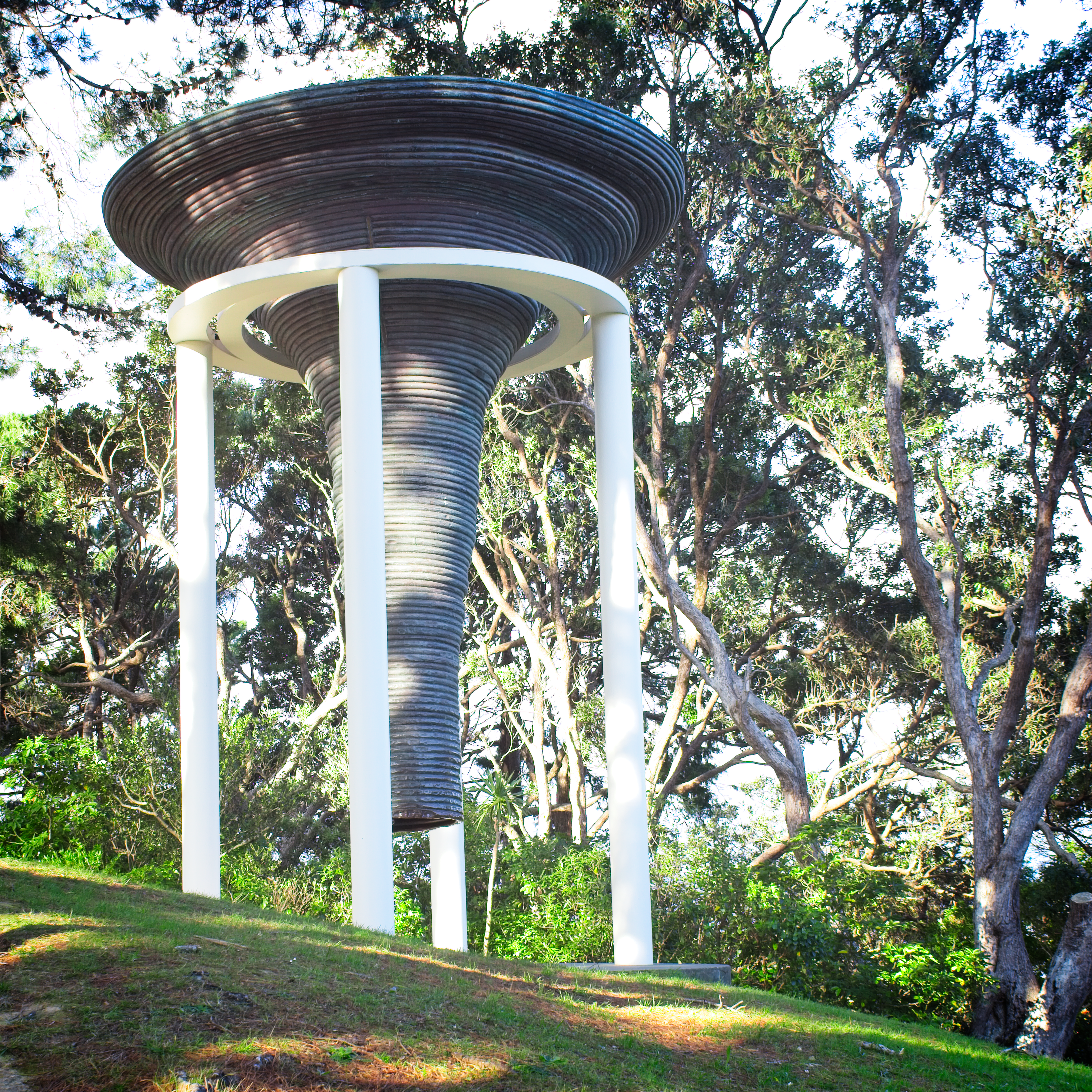
Listening and Viewing Device by Andrew Drummond

=== Botanic Garden ===
- Inner Form, also known as Bronze Form (1986) by Henry Moore – purchased after Moore died, one of only a few works offered by his estate. Originally displayed in Midland Park in Lambton Quay, it was moved in 1995 to the lawn on Salamanca Road in the Botanic Garden.
- Peacemaker (1991) by Chris Booth – a stack of boulders with water streaming down.
- Listening and Viewing Device (1993) by Andrew Drummond – a six-metre copper coil shaped like a funnel.
- Body to Soul (1996) by Mary–Louise Browne – words written on plaques form a staircase. The words change as the staircase rises changing from 'body' at the bottom to 'soul' at the top.
- Rudderstone (1997) by Denis O'Connor – a doorway in the shape of a rudder.

=== Wind sculpture walk, Cobham Drive ===
Pacific Grass by Kon Dimopoulos

Five kinetic sculptures make up the Wind Sculpture Walk on Cobham Drive. The sculptures were designed to take advantage of the windy location.

- Pacific Grass (2001) by Kon Dimopoulos
- Zephyrometer (2003) by Phil Price
- Tower of Light (2004) by Andrew Drummond
- Urban Forest (2007) by Leon van den Eijkel
- Akau Tangi (2010) by Philip Dadson

=== Central city ===
- Albatross (1986) by Tanya Ashken – in Frank Kitts Park.
- Ferns (1998) by Neil Dawson – a globe of ferns suspended over Civic Square. The sculpture was replaced in 2018 after the original was found to have structural weaknesses.
- Kaiwhakatere – the Navigator (2000) by Brett Graham – in Bowen Street. Sited opposite the Treasury where Henry Lang was Secretary from 1968 to 1977 it was commissioned to pay tribute to Lang's vision. Three granite blocks represent a bird's head, an altar and a waka acknowledging Polynesian navigation.
- Spinning Top (2002) by Robert Jahnke – a spinning top in Woodward St which represents both Māori and European history and the astrological calendar.
- Shells (2002) by Jeff Thomson – five painted concrete shells on the corner of Waring Taylor St and Lambton Quay.
- Protoplasm (2002) by Phil Price – a moving structure of green pebbles on the corner of Hunter St and Lambton Quay.
- Invisible City (2003) by Anton Parsons – steel blocks with Braille symbols on the corner of Grey St and Lambton Quay.
- Water Whirler (2006) by Len Lye – on the Wellington waterfront.
- Woman of Words (2013) by Virginia King – statue of author Katherine Mansfield in Midland Park on the corner of Waring Taylor St and Lambton Quay
- Walk the Line (2015) by Joe Sheehan – a line of 231 discs of pounamu and jade which trace the line of the Waipori Stream from Bowen St through the Cenotaph precinct
- The Grove (2022) by Glen Hayward – on the Wellington waterfront.
- Kimi/You are Here (2025) by Seung Yul Oh – unveiled in November 2025 in Waitangi Park

== Gallery ==
Wellington city sculptures

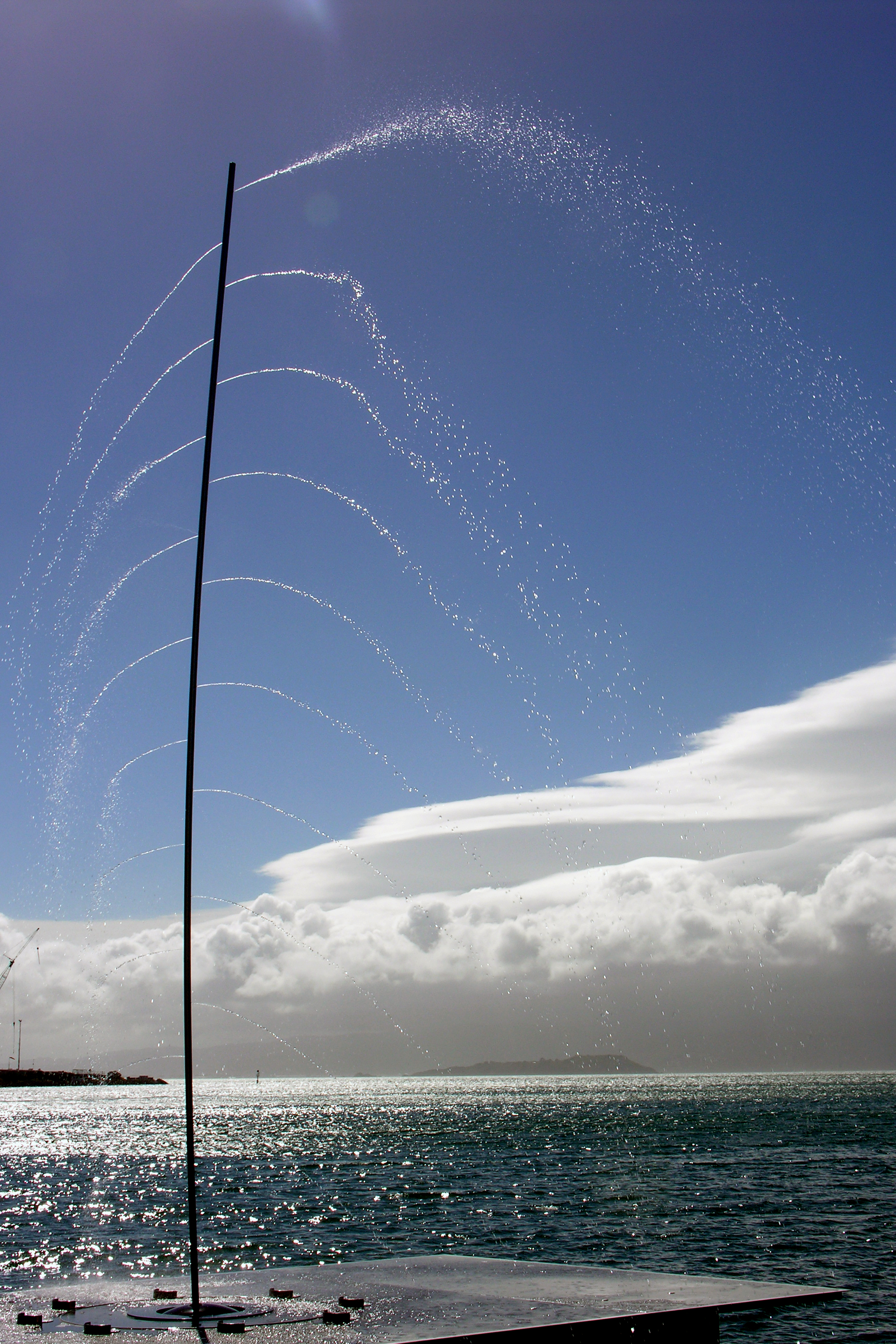
Water whirler by Len Lye

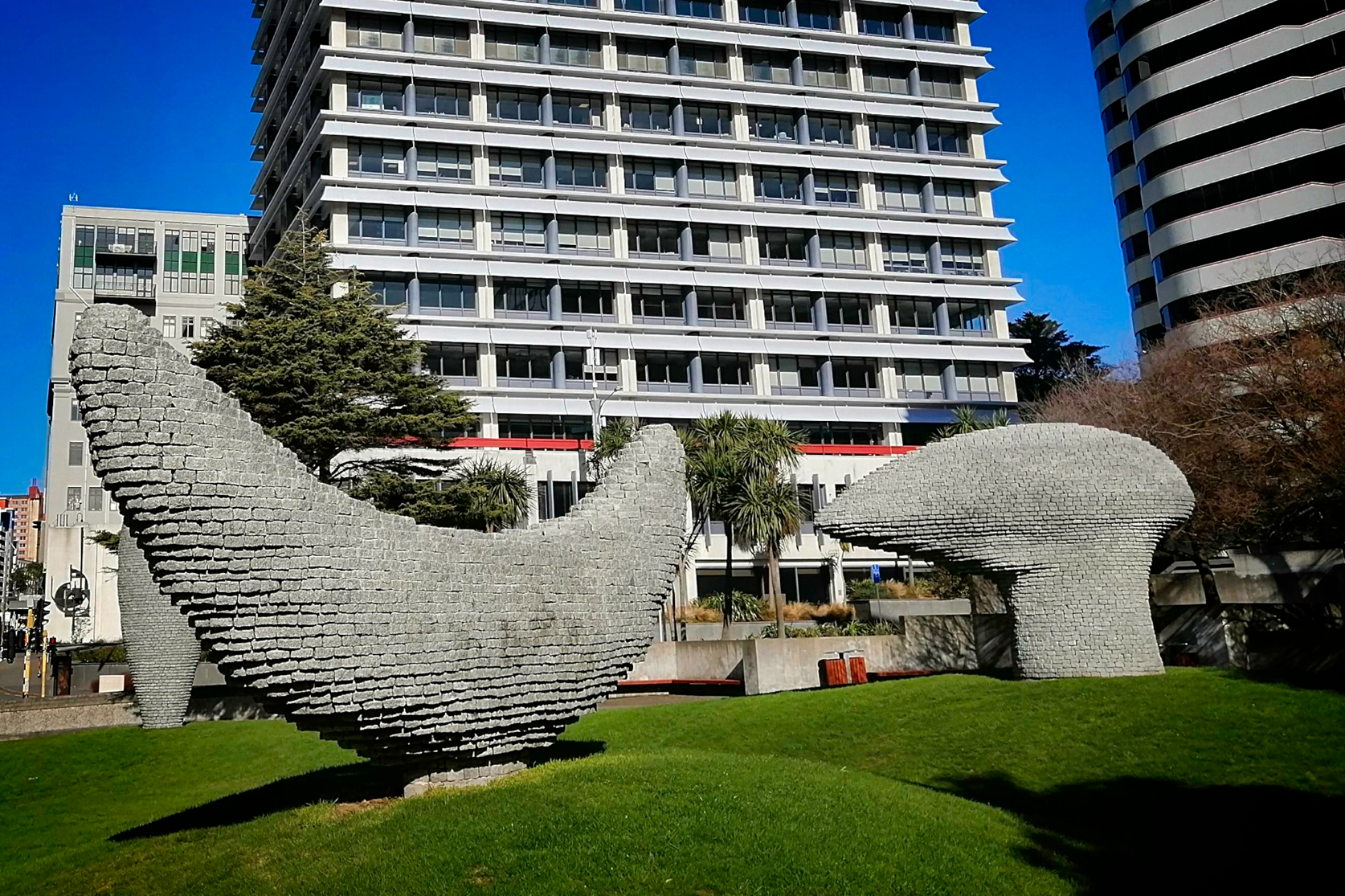
Kaiwhakatere – the navigator by Brett Graham

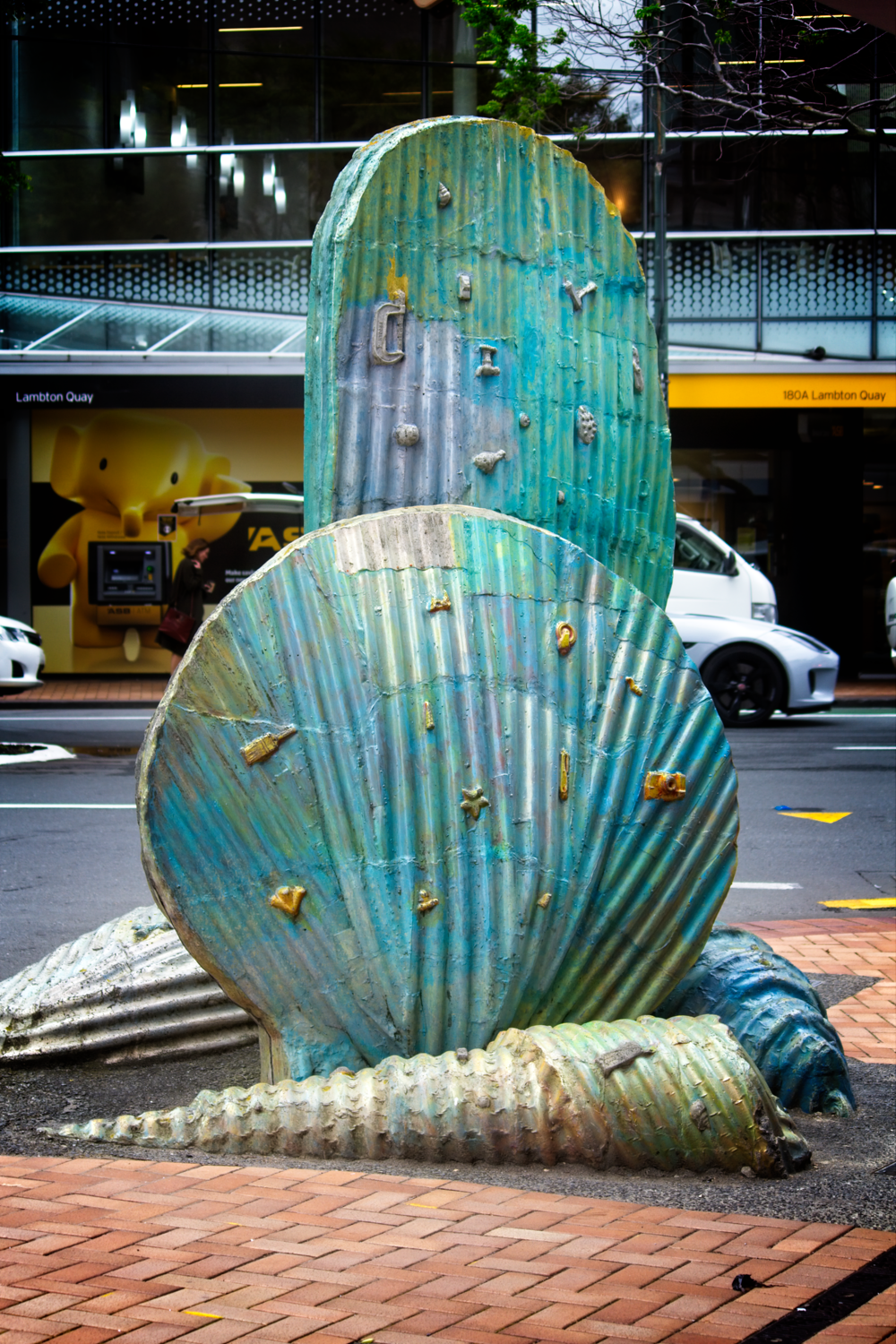
Shells by Jeff Thomson

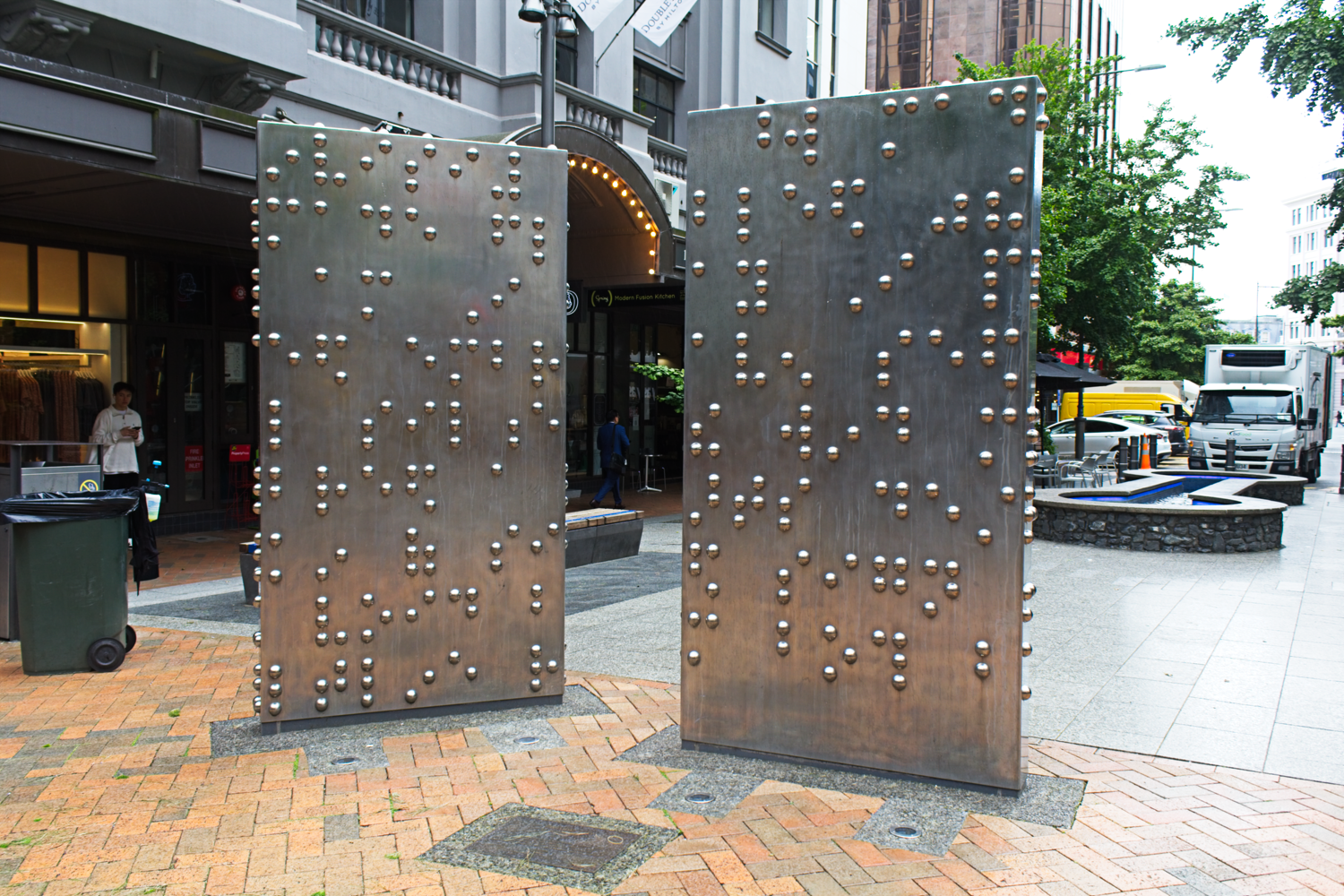
Invisible City by Anton Parsons
