= Parliament House, Wellington =

Home of the New Zealand legislature

Parliament House
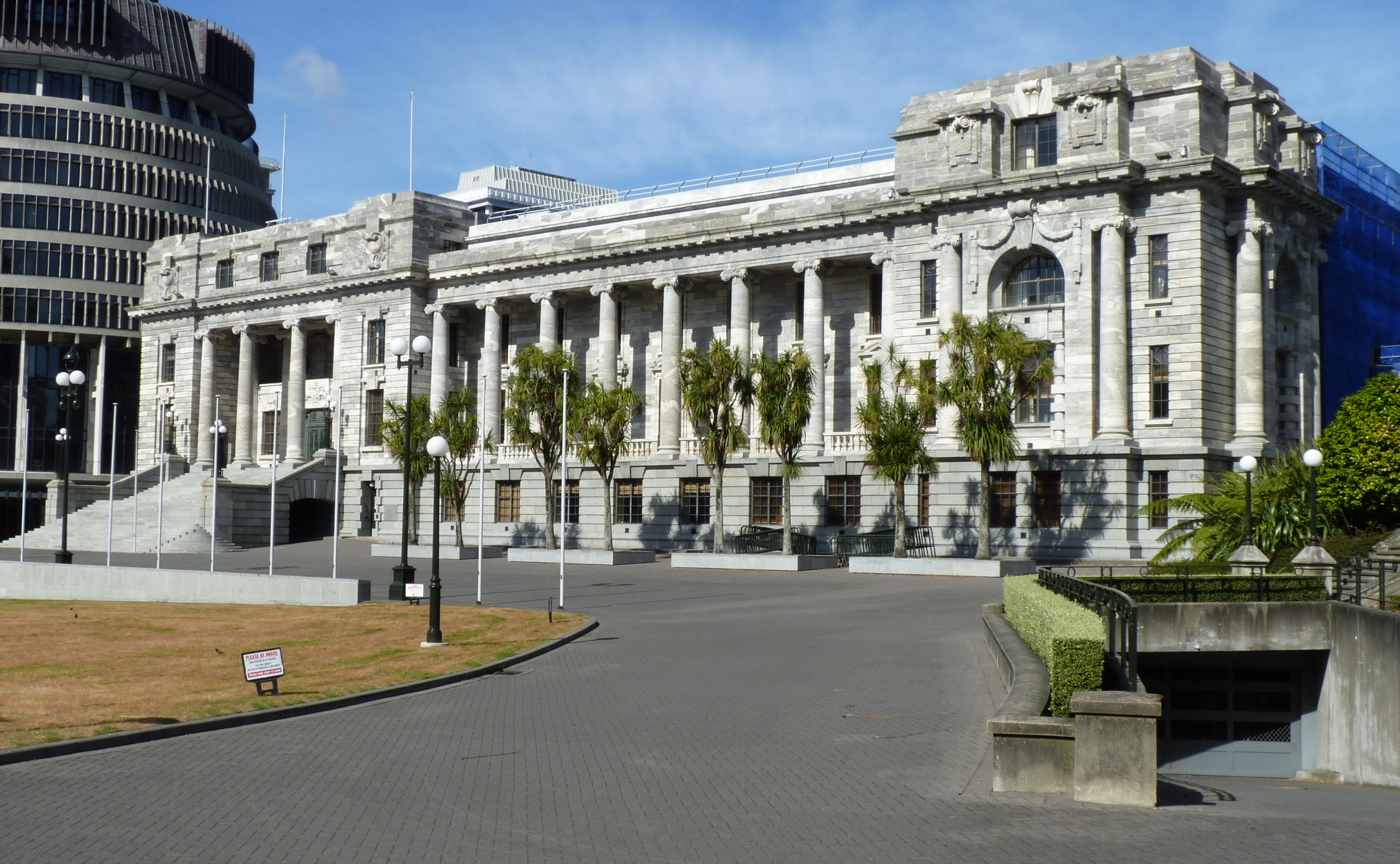
- Parliament House in Wellington

General information
- Architectural style: Neoclassical architecture
- Location: Lambton Quay, Wellington, New Zealand
- Coordinates: 41°16′40″S 174°46′35″E
- Construction started: 1914; 112 years ago
- Completed: 1922; 104 years ago
- Owner: New Zealand Parliament

Design and construction
- Architect: John Campbell

Heritage New Zealand – Category 1
- Designated: 20 July 1989
- Reference no.: 223

Parliament House on Lambton Quay, Wellington, is the main building of the New Zealand Parliament Buildings. It contains the Parliament's debating chamber, speaker's office, visitors' centre, and committee rooms. It was built between 1914 and 1922, replacing an earlier building that burned down in 1907. Parliament started using the yet to be completed building from 1918. Parliament House was extensively earthquake strengthened and refurbished between 1991 and 1995. It is open for visitors almost every day of the year, and is one of Wellington's major visitor attractions. Parliament House is a Category 1 historic building registered by Heritage New Zealand.

== Exterior architecture and design ==
Parliament House was designed in an Edwardian neoclassical style. It was deliberately designed to display New Zealand materials; the building is faced with Tākaka marble, with a base course of Coromandel granite. Major architectural features of the building exterior include a colonnade lining the front and a long set of steps leading to the main entrance.

In front of the building stand two pou (Māori wooden posts) which are carved with the semblance of Ngake and Whātaitai, traditional guardians of Wellington harbour, as well as three mōuri (vitality) markers on the ground in front of the steps. These were installed in 2023 to represent Māori culture and the role of the Treaty of Waitangi and Taranaki Whānui.

== Interior ==
Mostly New Zealand-sourced materials, including local stones and marble, were utilised in the foyer and other public areas.

At the centre of Parliament House is the debating chamber of the House of Representatives. It has a raised roof above galleries that circle the debating floor below. The chamber has rimu-panelled walls and, in commemoration of the colour scheme of the British House of Commons, the leather seats and carpets are green. The debating floor's seating plan accommodates up to 123 members (120 normally, plus any overhang seats).

Nearby is the Legislative Council chamber, which is encircled by galleries similar to those found above the House of Representatives chamber. Featuring a pūriri canopy and Italian marble columns, the chamber's red carpets pay tribute to the colour scheme of the House of Lords (its British counterpart). Although the Council has been abolished, the chamber is still used for state functions, such as the opening of Parliament.

== History ==
On 11 December 1907, the original Parliament House burned to the ground, along with all other parliament buildings except the library. The Liberal Government took this as an opportunity to completely redesign the seat of government, with unified buildings in permanent materials for the politicians and the supporting administration. A museum was allowed for and the public servants would move across from the Old Government Buildings on Lambton Quay.

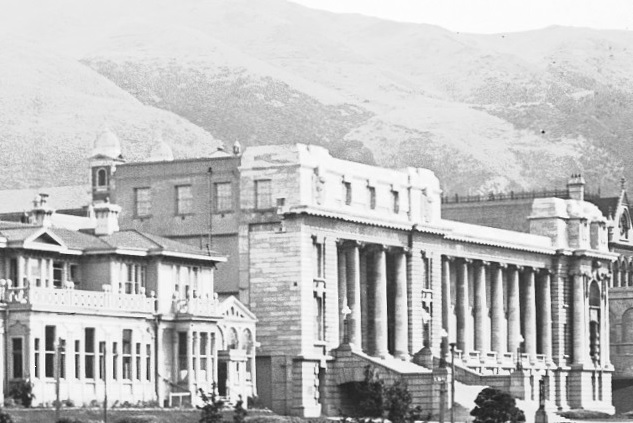
Government House (left) and Parliament House (right), c. 1929

A competition to find a replacement design was announced by Prime Minister Joseph Ward in February 1911 and 33 designs were entered. The winning design, by government architect John Campbell, was selected by Colonel Vernon, former government architect for New South Wales. As another of Campbell's entries won fourth place, the actual design is a combination of both entries. The design was divided into two stages. The first half, a Neoclassical building, contained both chambers and the second half Bellamy's and a new Gothic Revival library to replace the existing one.

Despite cost concerns, Prime Minister William Massey let construction of the first stage begin in 1914, but without much of the roof ornamentation or the roof domes. The outbreak of World War I created labour and material shortages that made construction difficult, and the choice of Tākaka marble added a logistical challenge to the building process. Chosen on account of its strength and polished finish, over 5000 tonnes would be utilised for build materials. By 1917, the top floor had been added and the grounds had been levelled, but everything was behind schedule. Although the building was unfinished, MPs moved into it in 1918 to get out of the old, cramped Government House (on the site now occupied by the Beehive). In 1922, the first stage was completed; the second stage was never built.

During the construction of the building, in 1915, a statue of Richard Seddon (a former prime minister who died in office in 1906) was erected 25 metres (82 ft) east of the main entrance steps. It was designed by Sir Thomas Brock of England.

=== 1990s restoration and strengthening ===
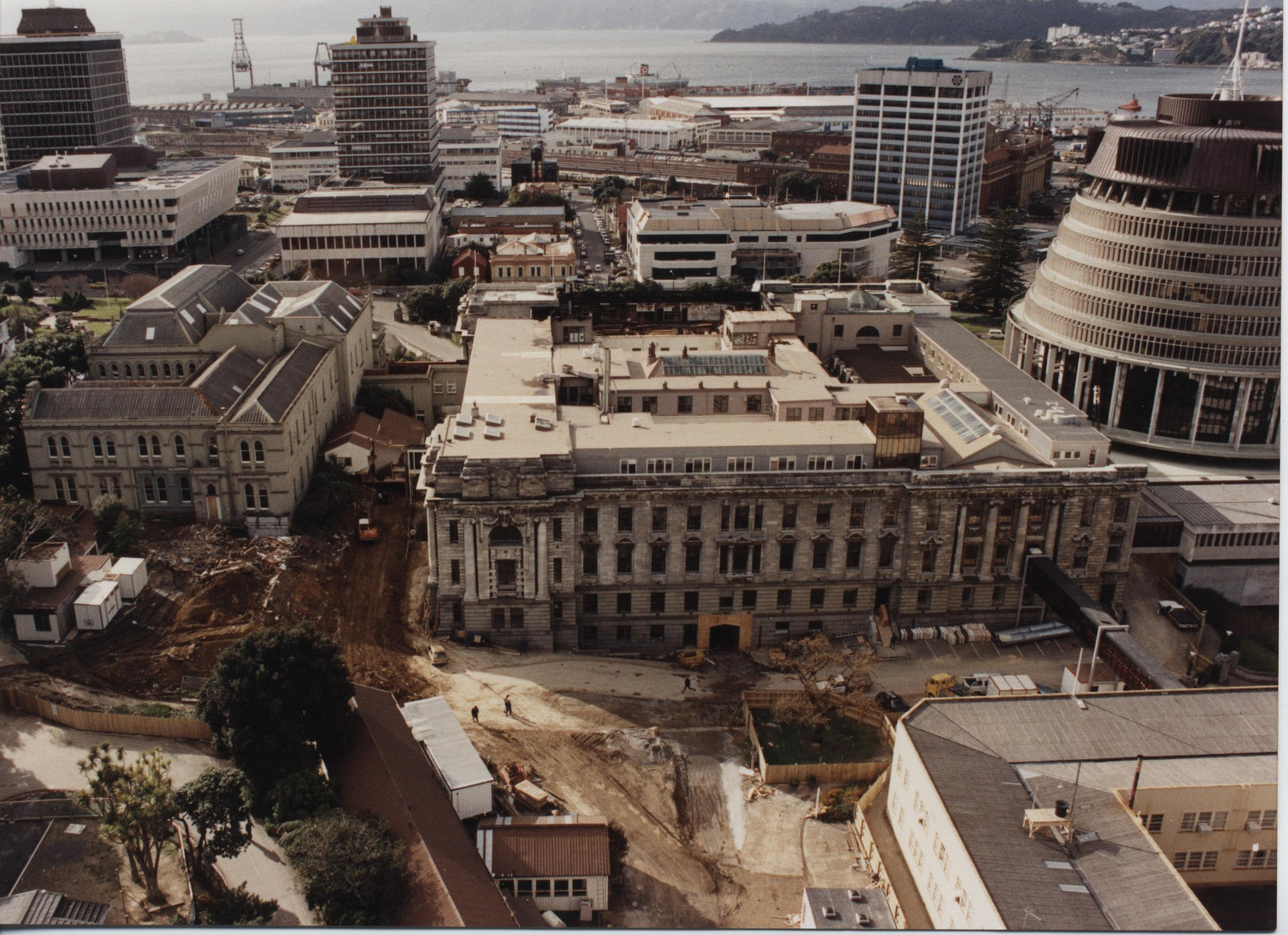
Restoration of Parliament House, 31 August 1992

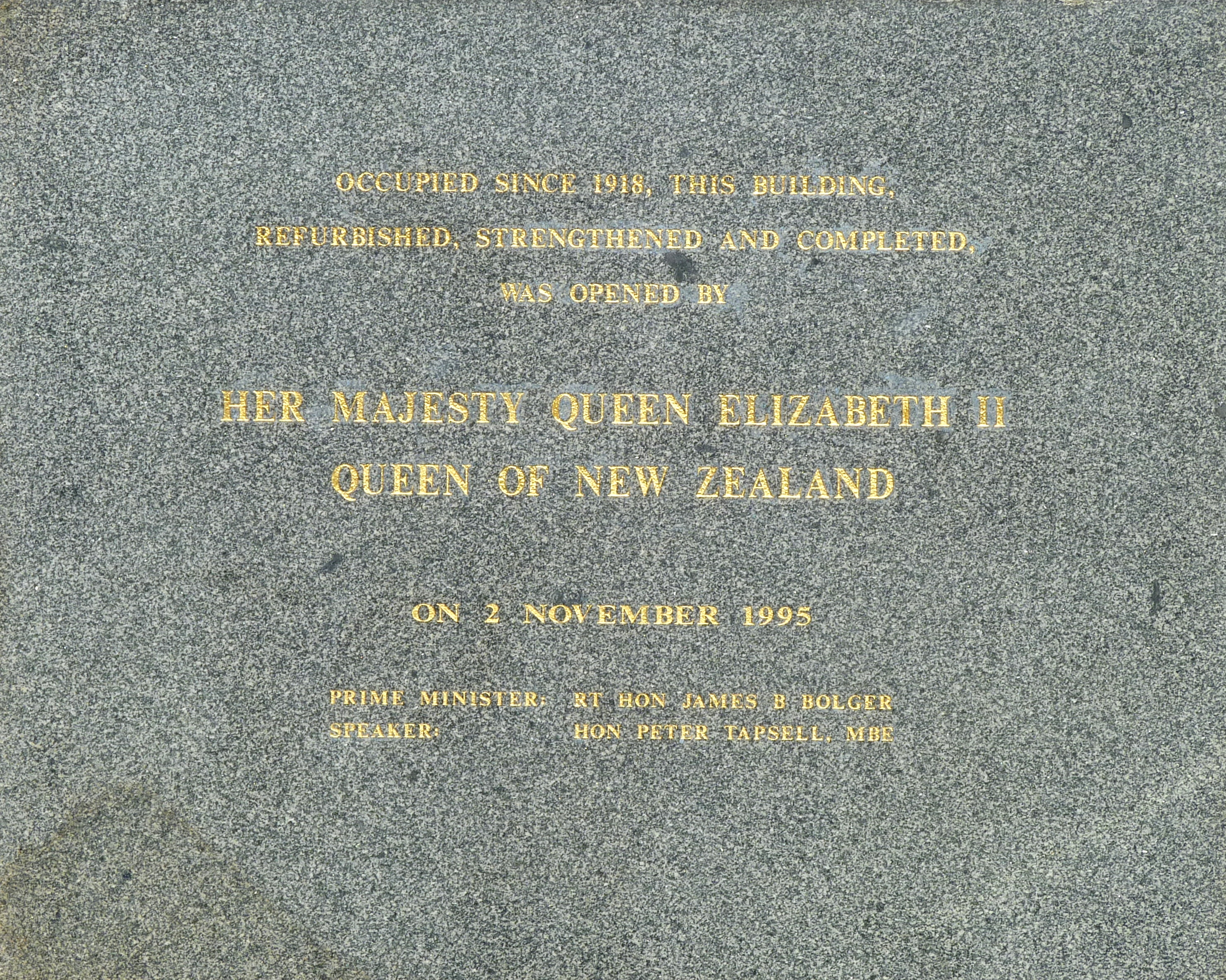
Plaque commemorating the re-opening of Parliament House by the Queen on 2 November 1995.

During the 1980s, there were discussions about earthquake risk, and the exterior of Parliament House had started to look shabby. There was even discussion about demolishing it. In 1989, the New Zealand Historic Places Trust (now known as Heritage New Zealand Pouhere Taonga) assigned the highest heritage rating to the building – Category I. This helped convince the decision makers to have the building strengthened and renovated, and what was up to then New Zealand's largest heritage building conservation project began. In 1991, members moved across to Bowen House, where a temporary debating chamber had been built. Base isolation was installed, and at its peak, 400 workers were on site plus an additional 300 people were working offsite on the project. The renovated building was officially opened in November 1995 by Elizabeth II, Queen of New Zealand, after its comprehensive strengthening and refurbishment. The parliamentarians had their first session in the renovated building in February 1996.

The intention of the Liberal Government had been for the design to be implemented in stages, eventually resulting in a coherent architectural setting. Instead, as Heritage New Zealand remarks, the setting that has been achieved "has little aesthetic or architectural coherence", especially through the construction of the Beehive instead of completion of Parliament House.

== Visiting and tours ==
Parliament is open to the public every day apart from some key public holidays; entry is subject to security screening. Free one-hour tours are offered between 10 am and 4 pm on the full hour. Access to the public galleries above the debating chamber is not part of the tour, is only possible on days the house is sitting, and a dress code applies. Parliament House has a visitor centre, with opening hours slightly longer than the times during which tours are offered.

== Photo gallery ==
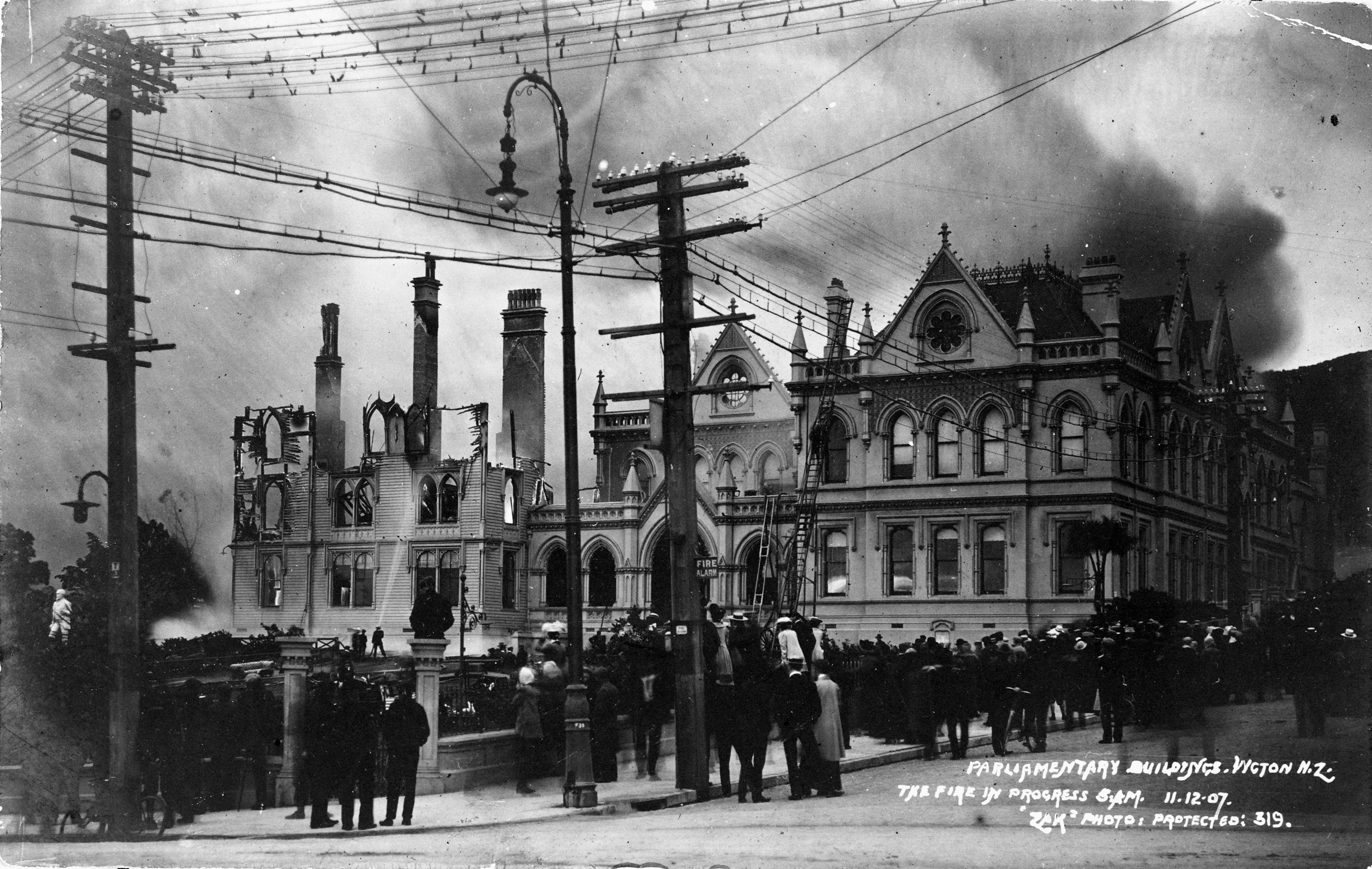
1907 fire. The left wing housed Parliament, while the right wing is the extant Parliamentary Library.

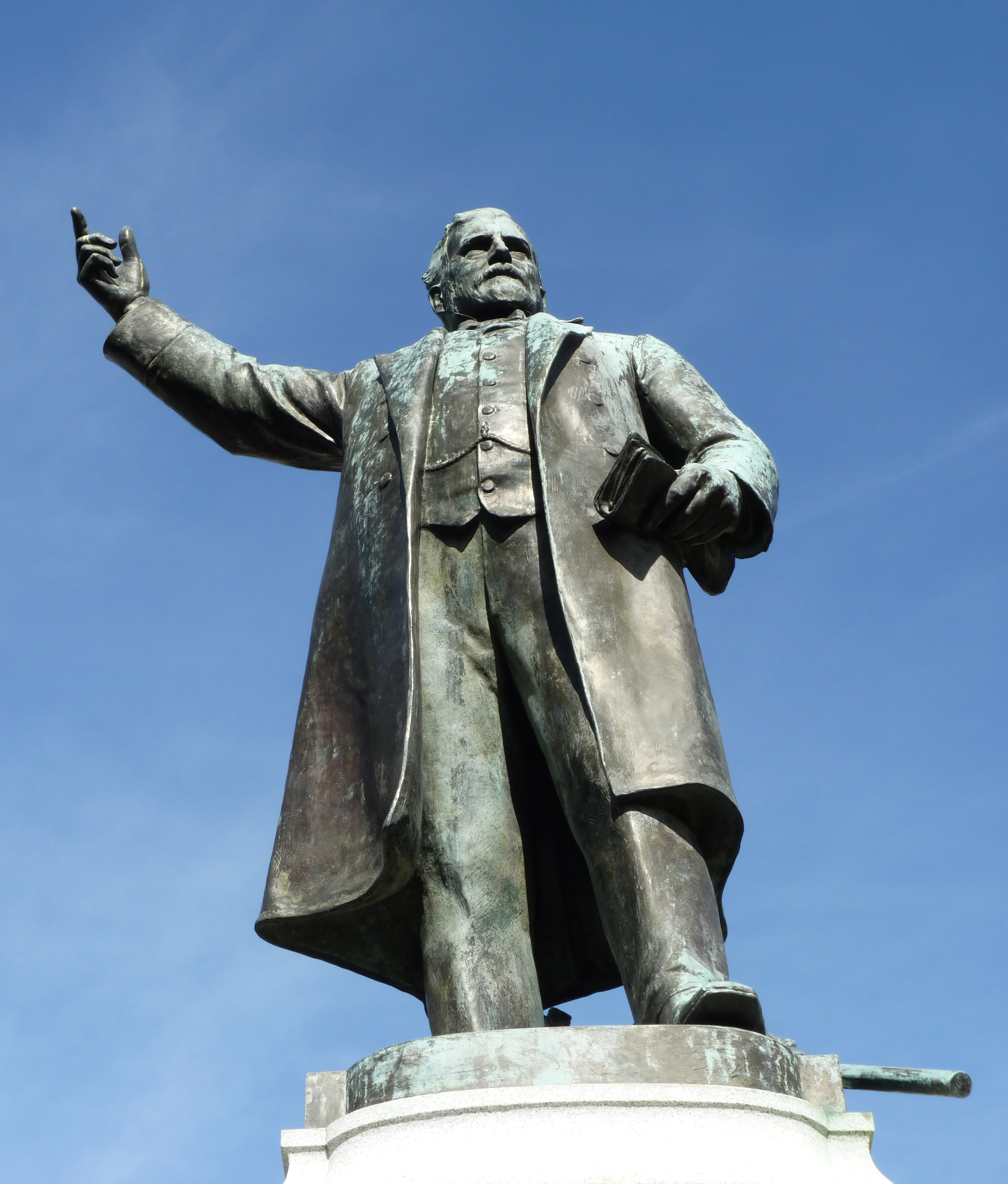
Statue of Richard Seddon (1845–1906)

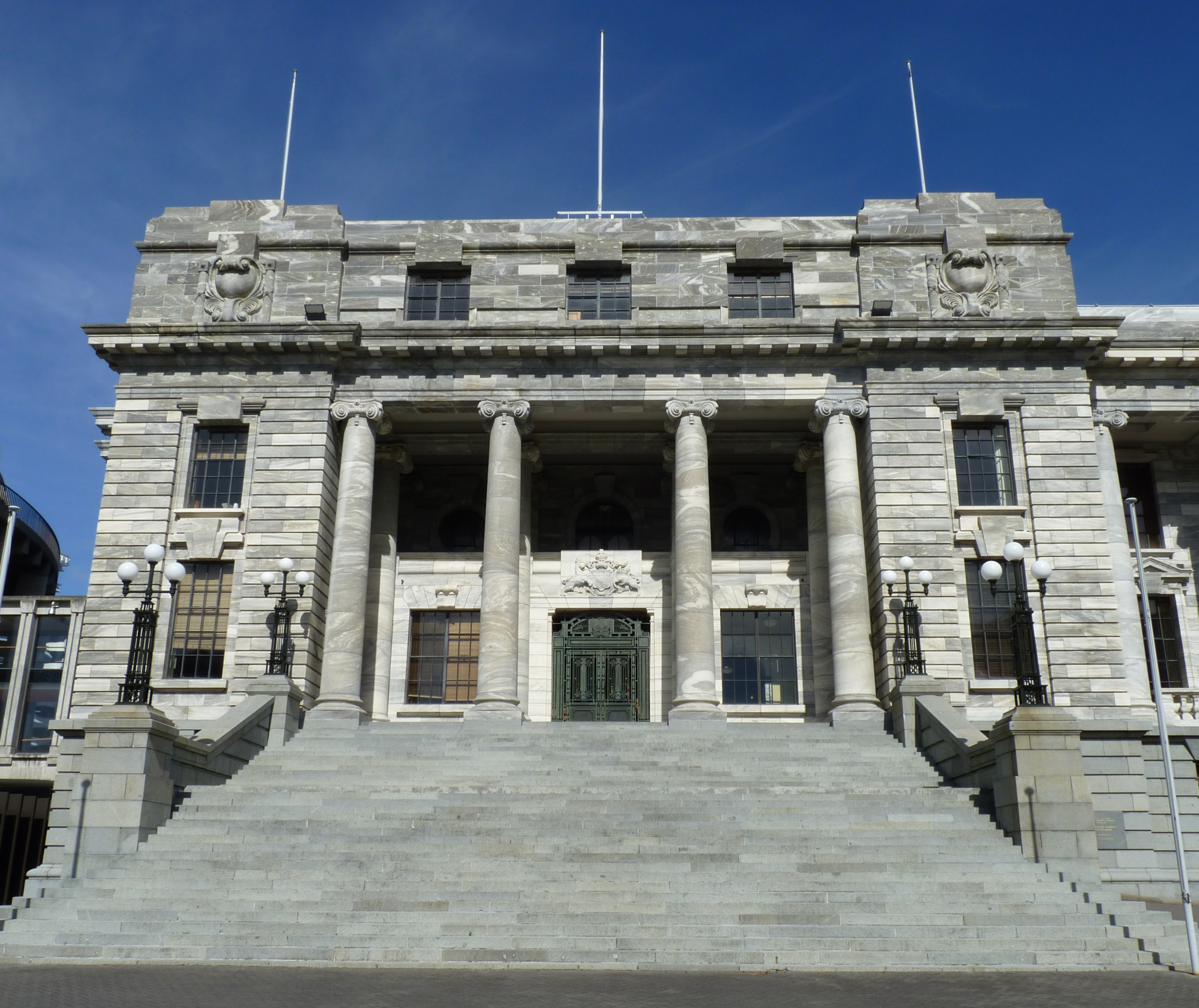
Main entrance

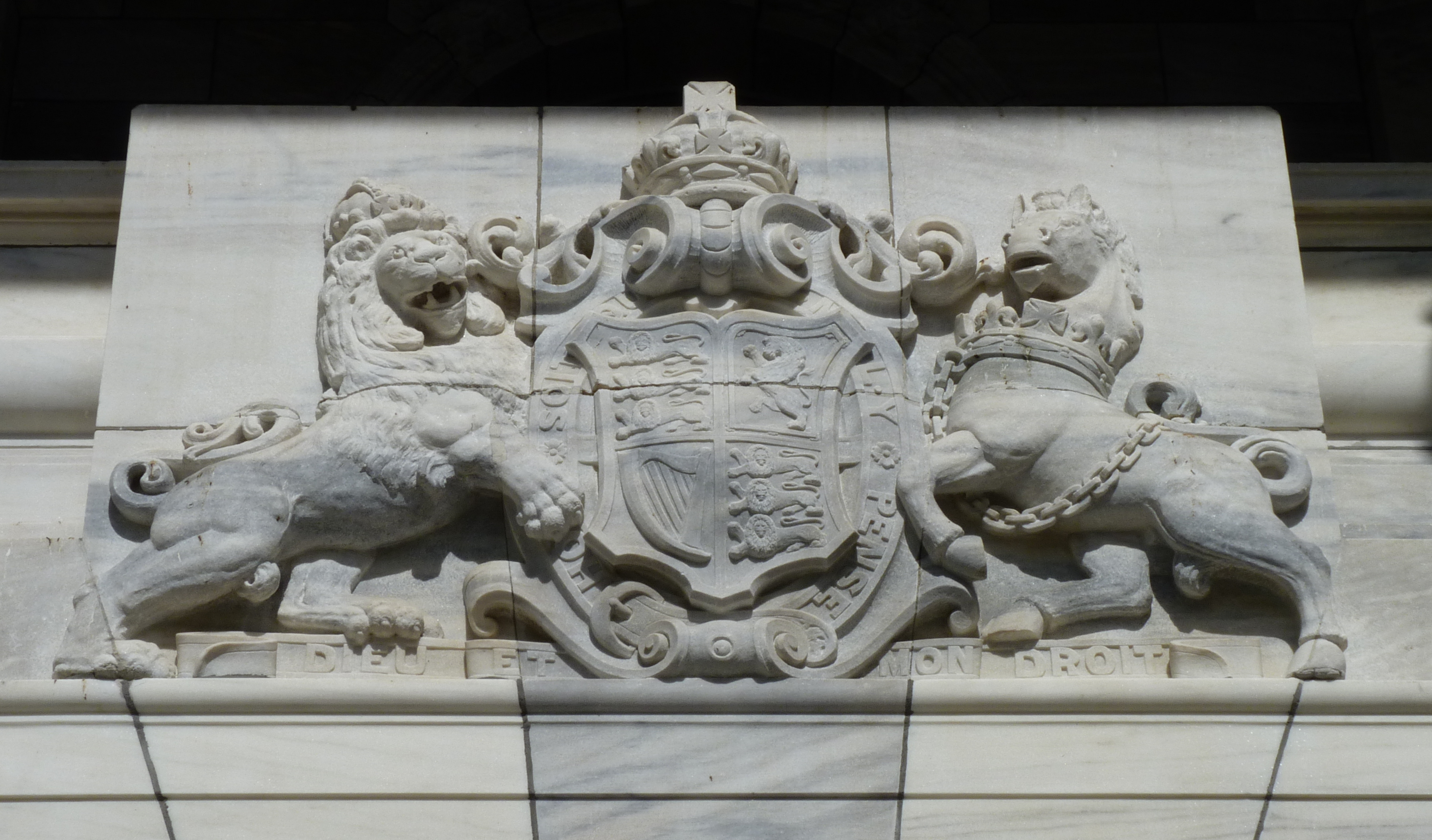
Royal coat of arms above entrance

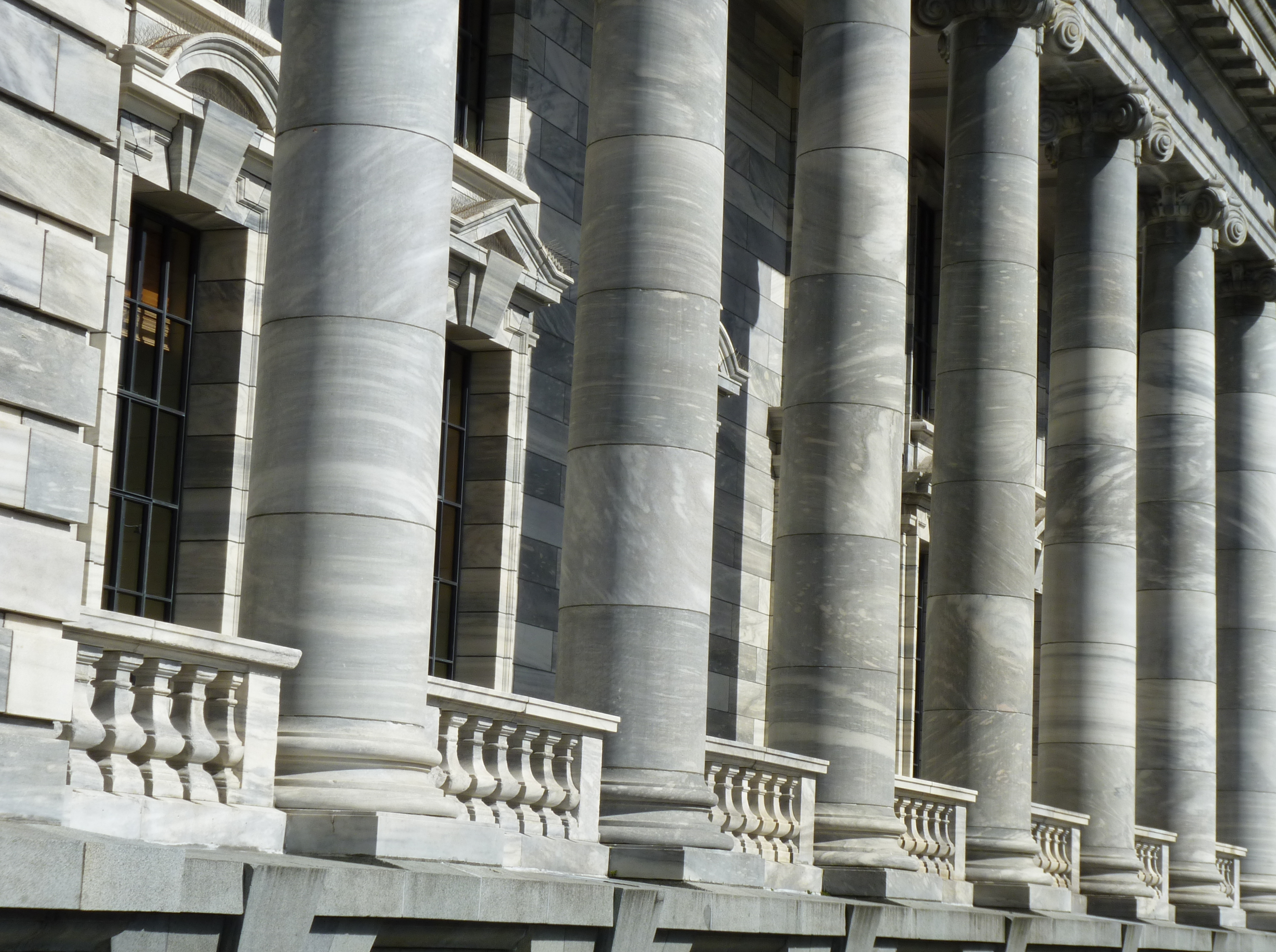
Columns lining the front facade

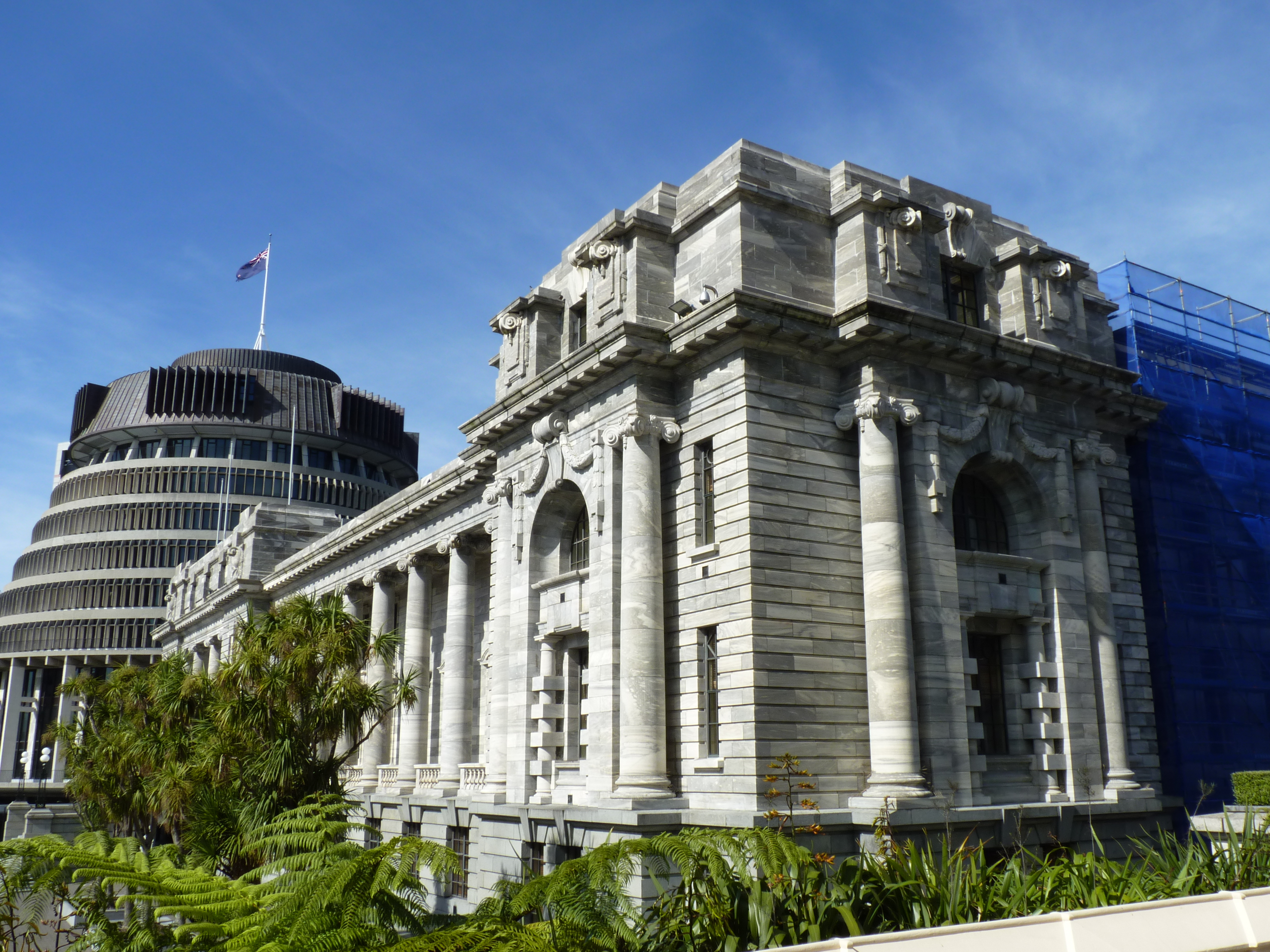
View of the north end

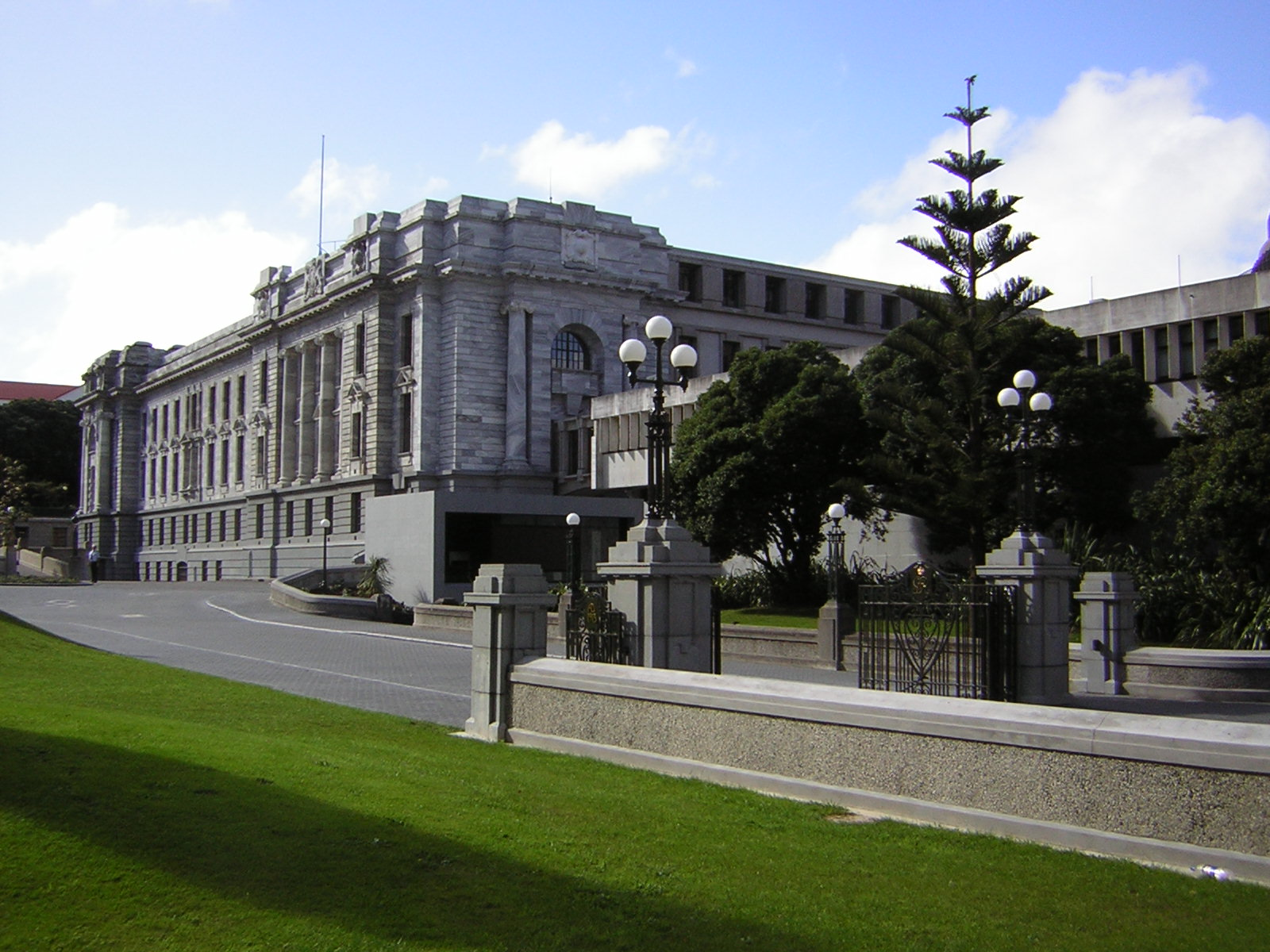
West end (rear entrance)

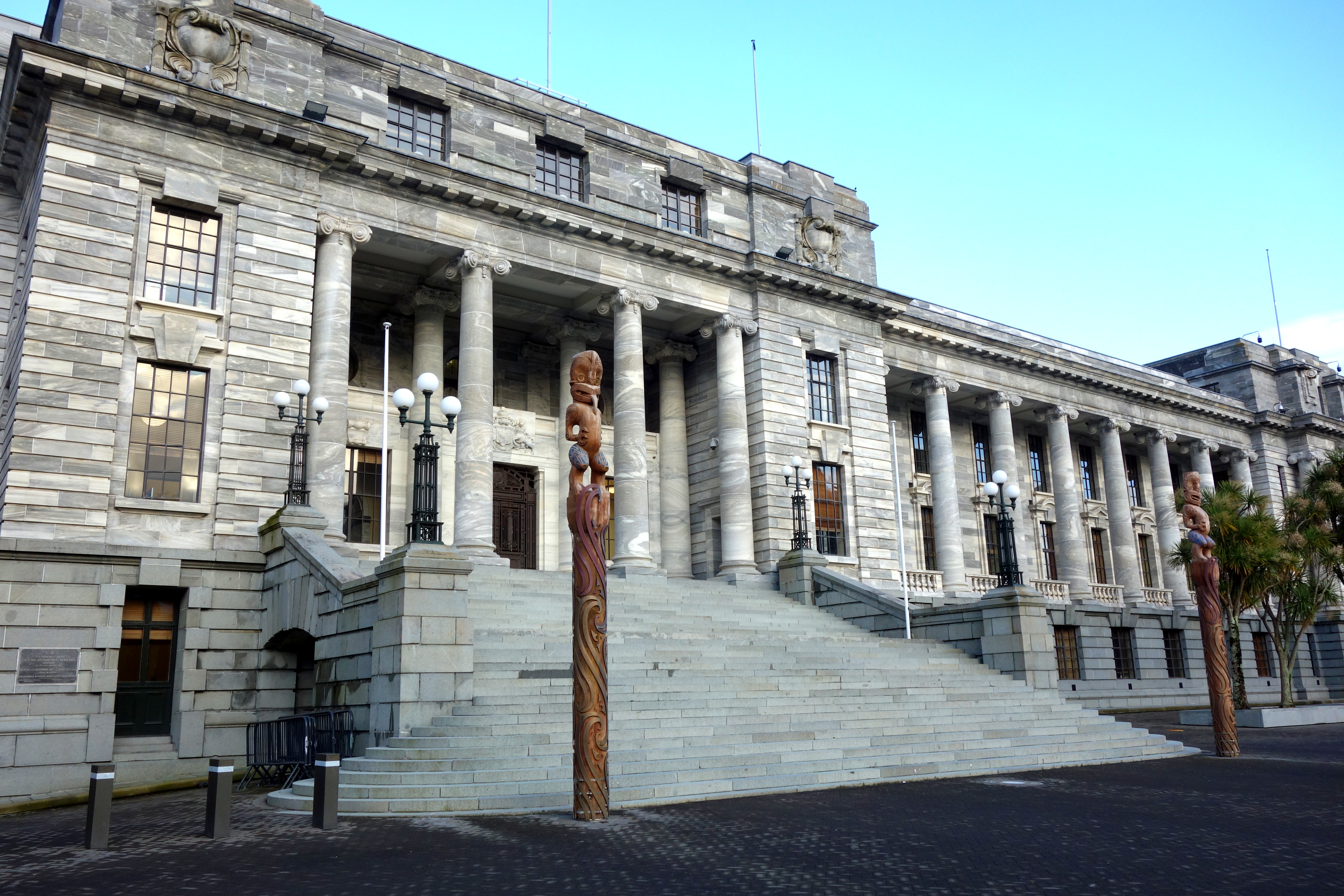
Pou (posts) in front of the grand staircase
