= Promotion (rank) =

Advancement of ranking within a hierarchy

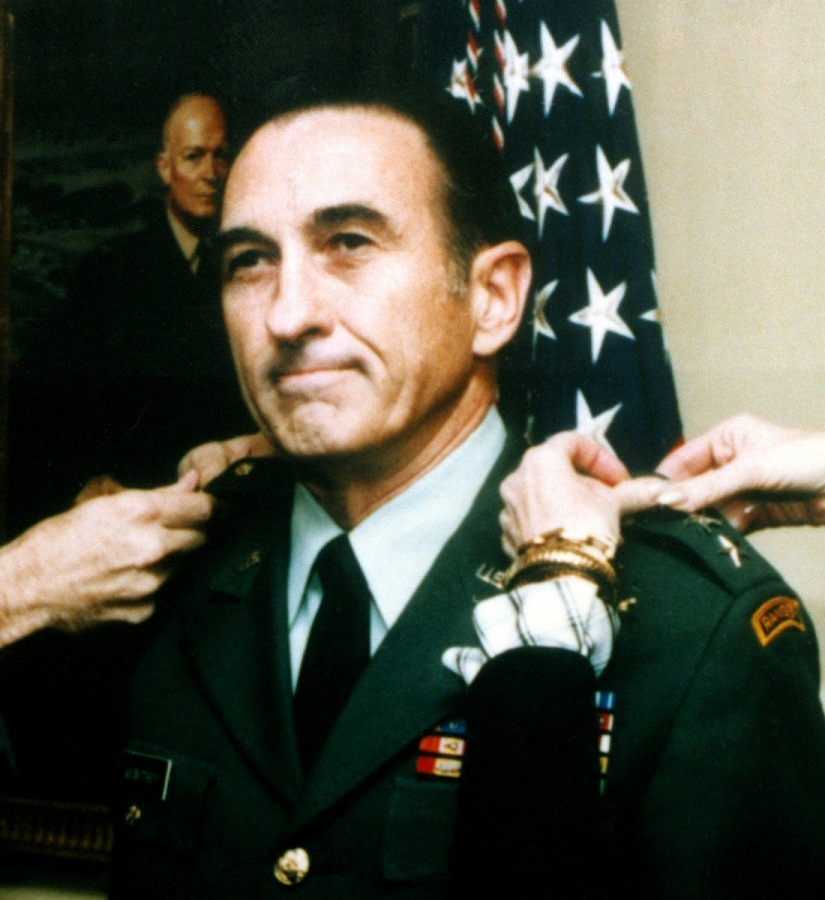
Promotion in the military: Louis C. Menetrey, United States Army, promoted to lieutenant general in 1982.

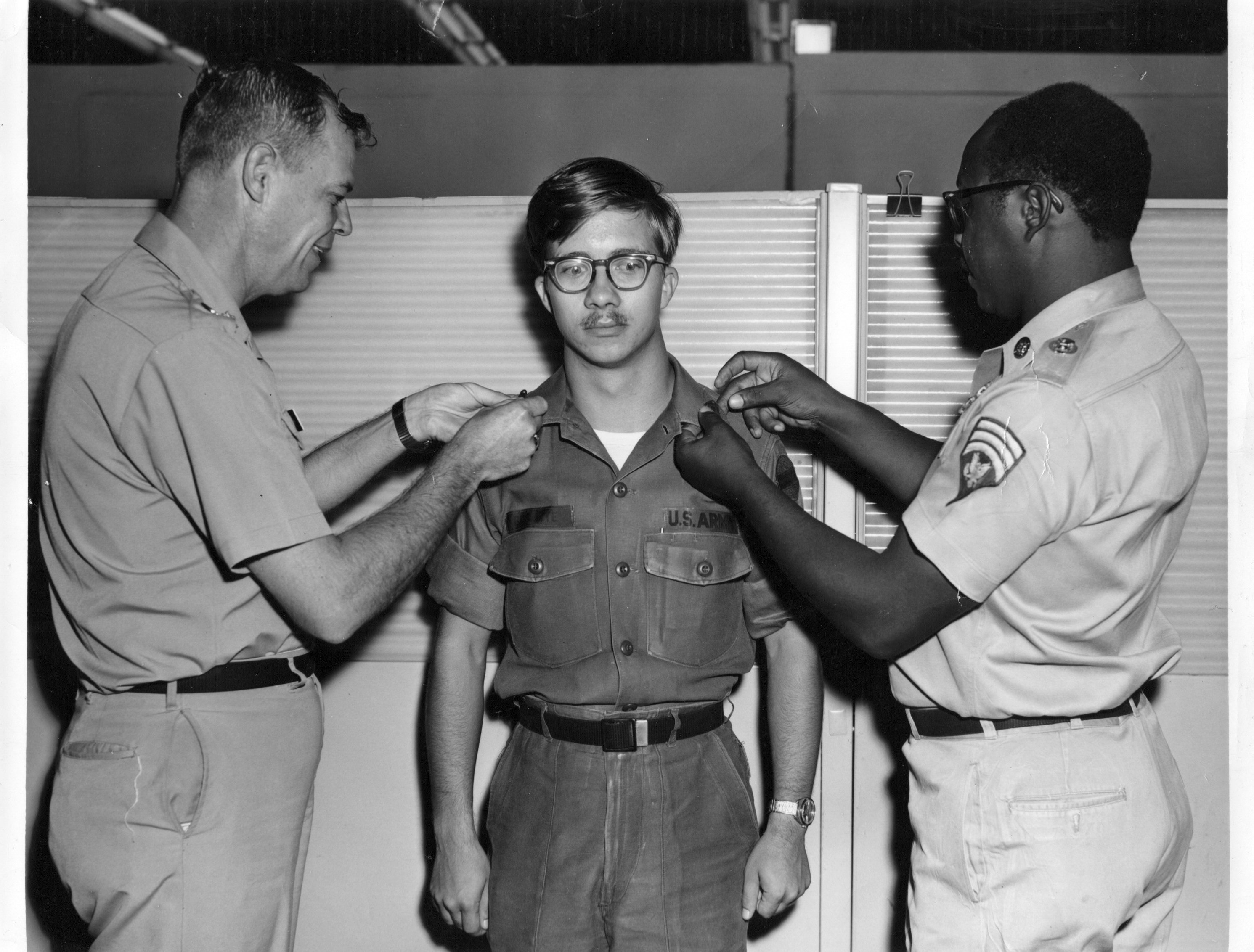
Promotion in the military: United States Army, enlisted promotion 1972

A promotion is the advancement of an employee's rank, role or position in an organizational hierarchy system. Promotion may be an employee's reward for good performance, i.e., positive appraisal.

Organizations can use promotions to motivate and control employees. Before a company promotes an employee to a particular position it might ensure that the person is able to handle the added responsibilities by screening the employee with interviews and tests and giving them training or on-the-job experience.

A promotion can involve advancement in terms of designation, salary and benefits, and in some organizations the type of job activities may change a great deal. The opposite of a promotion is a demotion.

== Elements ==
A promotion involve advancement in terms of designation, salary and benefits, and in some organizations the type of job activities may change a great deal. In many companies and public service organizations, more senior positions have a different title: an analyst who is promoted becomes a "principal analyst"; an economist becomes a "senior economist"; or an associate professor becomes a "full professor". The amount of salary increase associated with a promotion varies a great deal between industries and sectors, and depending on what parts of the hierarchical ladder an employee is moving between. In some industries or sectors, there may be only a modest increase in salary for a promotion; in other fields, a promotion may substantially increase an employee's salary.

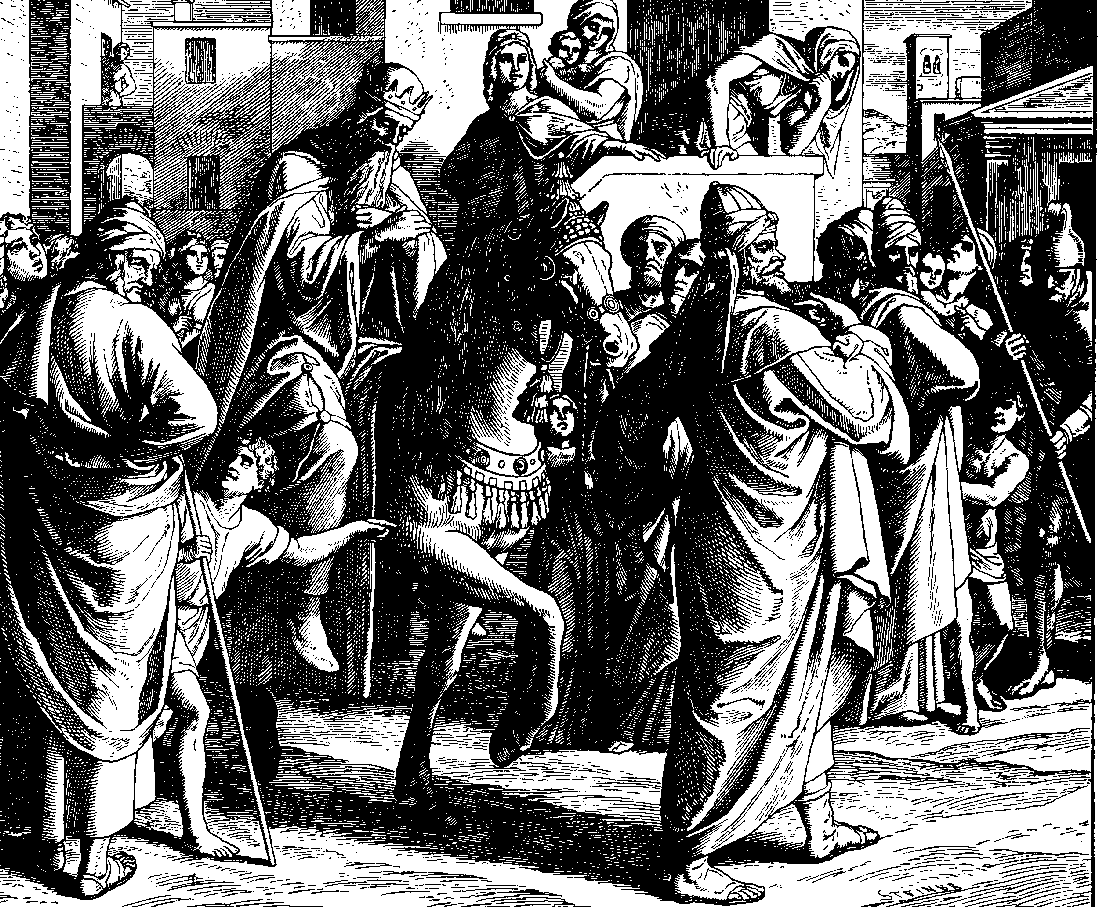
Mordecai is honored in this 1860 woodcut by Julius Schnorr von Karolsfeld

The same is true with benefits and other privileges; in some industries, the promotion only changes the title and salary, and there are no additional benefits or privileges (beyond the psycho-social benefits that may accrue to the individual). In some not-for-profit organizations, the values of the organization or the tightness of funding may result in there being only modest salary increases associated with a promotion. In other industries, especially in private sector companies, a promotion to senior management may carry a number of benefits, such as employee stock options, a reserved parking space, a corner office with a secretary, and bonus pay for good performance.

The degree to which job activities change varies between industries and sectors. In some fields, even after an employee is promoted, they continue to do similar work. For example, a policy analyst in the federal government who is promoted to the post of senior policy analyst will continue to do similar tasks such as writing briefing notes and carrying out policy research. The differences may be in the complexity of the files that the individual is assigned to or in the sensitivity of the issues that they are asked to deal with. In other fields, when an employee is promoted, their work changes substantially. For example, whereas a staff engineer in a civil engineering firm will spend their time doing engineering inspections and working with blueprints, a senior engineer may spend most of their day in meetings with senior managers and reading financial reports. In symphony orchestras, when a musician such as a violinist is promoted to the position of concertmaster, their duties change substantially. As a violin player, the individual played the music as part of the violin section. As a concertmaster, the individual plays solo parts, decides on the bowings and interpretation of the music, and leads the violins during performances.

Different organizations grant the hiring and promoting managers different levels of discretion to award promotions. In some parts of the private sector, the senior management has a very high level of discretion to award promotions, and they can promote employees without going through much procedures or formalities such as testing, screening, and interviewing. In the public sector and in academia, there are usually many more checks and balances in place to prevent favoritism or bias. In many Western public service bodies, when a manager wants to promote an employee, they must follow a number of steps, such as advertising the position, accepting applications from qualified candidates, screening and interviewing candidates, and then documenting why they chose a particular candidate. In academia, a similar approach is used, with the added safeguard of including several layers of committee review of the proposed promotion using committees which include members of other faculty and experts from other universities.

== See also ==
- Peter Principle
- Ethnic penalty
- Glass ceiling
