= List of metonyms =

This article lists commonly-used metonyms. Since metonymy (Note: The process by which metonyms are formed) is a productive process, new metonyms will be coined and existing ones will fall into disuse.

== Objects ==
Word or phrase	Literal meaning	Metonymic meaning
bar	The bar in a courtroom that separates judges and lawyers from laypeople	All the lawyers licensed to practise law in a certain court or jurisdiction
bed	Furniture used for sleeping or reclining	Sexual relations between individuals
bench	The location in a courtroom where a judge sits when presiding over a court	All the judges of a court or jurisdiction; members of a judiciary; the presiding officer (judge) in a court
boots on the ground	Footwear worn by soldiers	Combat troops deployed in a geographic area (as opposed to those awaiting deployment and/or in aircraft or ships offshore)
box office	A place where tickets are sold; including for films	Refers to measuring the popularity and financial success of a film. "The film is a hit at the box office."
brass	A metal alloy used for or in the manufacture of e.g. buttons, insignia and musical instruments	Military and police officers, often also referring to managers/bosses outside the uniformed
bullpen	The area of a baseball field used by relief pitchers to warm up for a game	A baseball team's roster of relief pitchers
cap	White silk hats given to players each time they played for the England national football team	A player's appearance in a game at the international level
china	A country	Chinese porcelain or other types of ceramic
city hall	A city's chief administrative building	Local government or, more pejoratively, government in general
corner office	An office on a building corner with more windows	Corporate leadership, or the Governor of Massachusetts (see below)
crown	A type of monarchical headwear	Monarchy, especially the British monarchy (as "The Crown")
dish	An item on which food is served or eaten	A course of a meal, or the foundation of a course (usually the main course)
gun	A firearm	An assassin, mercenary or soldier (as in "hired gun")
lead	A heavy metal used to manufacture ammunition	Bullets
mortal	Subject to death	Human
pen	A writing instrument	A written words, communication or journalism
pink slip	A discharge notice; historically, a pink colored slip of paper in an employee's pay envelope	A layoff or termination of employment
press	A machine used to print newspapers	Journalists, reporters, or others who write or announce the news
record label	The circular label in the center of a vinyl record displaying the manufacturer's name	A music company involved in producing, marketing, and distributing music recordings and music videos
red tape	Tape that is coloured red	An over-bureaucratic process
shovels in the ground	Digging in the soil using a variety of tools or machines	Commencement of a construction project – usually one that is major or infrastructural
slate	A writing tablet made of slate	A written record of a debt, particularly in a small shop or public house
suits	Business attire (plural)	Business executives and lawyers
sweat	Perspiration	Hard (physical) work
title	A name given to a book, video game, film, piece of software, or other piece of creative work.	A piece of published work itself.
tongue	Oral muscle	A language or dialect

== Places ==
=== Africa ===
Word or phrase	Literal meaning	Metonymic meaning
Arat Kilo	Neighborhood in Addis Ababa	The Federal Government of Ethiopia
Ikulu	The official residence of the president of Tanzania	The State House and its administration

=== Asia ===
Word or phrase	Literal meaning	Metonymic meaning
Bangalore	A city in Southern India	The Indian technology industry
Beijing	The capital of China	The Chinese government, particularly the leadership
Fukushima	A city in Japan	The 2011 Tōhoku earthquake and tsunami and subsequent Fukushima Daiichi nuclear disaster
Hiroshima and Nagasaki	Two cities in southwestern Japan	The atomic bombings of Hiroshima and Nagasaki by the Allied forces in August 1945
Malacañang	Official residence of the president of the Philippines	The Philippine Government, particularly the President, the Cabinet and their advisers, and the officials under the Office of the President of the Philippines
Raisina Hill	A hill in Lutyens' Delhi, New Delhi	The Government of India
Senayan	A subdistrict of South Jakarta	The People's Consultative Assembly, its members, and the leadership of Indonesia's various political parties
Tehran	The capital city of Iran	The Government of Iran
Zhongnanhai	A former imperial garden adjacent to an eponymous lake in central Beijing, now used as residences	The leadership of the Chinese government
Zion	A mountain located in the Levant	The city of Jerusalem or the people associated with it

=== Europe ===
Word or phrase	Literal meaning	Metonymic meaning
10 Downing Street ("Number 10")	The official residence of the prime minister of the United Kingdom (Note: Technically, 10 Downing Street is the official residence of the First Lord of the Treasury, not the prime minister. However, the two offices have been held by the same person since the early 20th century.)	The prime minister and their staff, often meaning more broadly the UK Government
Brussels	The capital of Belgium	The government of the European Union
Buckingham Palace or the Palace	A large building in London that is the official residence of the reigning British sovereign	The British royal family and its staff
The City	The City of London, the part of Central London, England, that has the longest continuous recorded history	The financial (and related) institutions in the United Kingdom
Davos	A town in Switzerland	The World Economic Forum
Fleet Street	A street in the City of London	The British national press
The Hague	A city in the Netherlands	The International Criminal Court or International Court of Justice, both of which have their seat in the city
Hillsborough	Hillsborough an area of Sheffield, United Kingdom and location of Hillsborough Stadium.	The Hillsborough disaster in 1989 where 97 Liverpool F.C. fans died in a human crush. Also used as a word for police corruption and cover-up.
Holyrood	An area in Edinburgh	The Scottish Parliament, which is located in that area, or more generally the Scottish Government
Horse Guards	A cavalry barracks at Whitehall, London	Commander-in-chief of the British army and his staff before 1857
Hrad ("The Castle")	The Prague Castle and official residence and office of the president of the Czech Republic	The president of the Czech Republic and his or her staff, and also the Czech Republic as a whole
Kastilja or Castile	Auberge de Castille, an 18th-century auberge in the Maltese capital Valletta	The Office of the Prime Minister of Malta
The Kremlin	A historic type of Russian fortress or citadel	The Moscow Kremlin and/or the Russian presidential administration; historically, any Russian or Soviet government (e.g. Kremlinology)
M25	A motorway circling the London conurbation	London, or the Greater London urban area, though the two boundaries do not precisely coincide
Moncloa	Palace of Moncloa, the official residence of the Prime Minister of Spain	The Spanish central government
North of Watford	Watford Gap, a low point in a hill range used as a divide between North and South England	The North of England
Quai d'Orsay	A wharf and adjoining street in the 7th arrondissement of Paris, France	The French Ministry of Foreign Affairs and International Development, which is located at 37 Quai d'Orsay
Savile Row	A short street in central London	The high-quality bespoke men's suits made by tailors' shops on the street
Scotland Yard ("The Yard")	The original public entrance (via "Great Scotland Yard") to the headquarters of the London Metropolitan Police Service	London or British police, especially detectives
Stormont	An estate in County Down, east of Belfast	The Northern Ireland Assembly
Sublime Porte	A gate giving access to a block of government buildings in Istanbul, Turkey	The Imperial Government of the Ottoman Empire (sometimes, more specifically, its foreign policies and relations)
Tamminiemi	A villa in Helsinki and a former official residence of the president of Finland	Historically the president of Finland, mostly associated with Urho Kekkonen
Threadneedle Street	A street in the City of London	The Bank of England and/or its directors
The Vatican	A small sovereign state located in Rome, Italy	The Holy See, and the Roman Catholic Church in general
West End	A district of London	The theatre scene of London; A show which was originally produced in the West End of London.
Westminster	A part of Central London, England	The Parliament of the United Kingdom
Whitehall	A street in the City of Westminster borough of London	The Civil Service of the United Kingdom, or more generally the Government of the United Kingdom; the term is often used in a similar context to "Westminster" (above)
Wilhelmstraße	A street in Berlin, Germany	The Federal Foreign Office of Germany

=== North America ===
Word or phrase	Literal meaning	Metonymic meaning
Armonk	Armonk, New York, where the headquarters of IBM is located	IBM
Bay Street	A street in downtown Toronto	The Canadian financial sector, since the Toronto Stock Exchange, and the headquarters of the five major Canadian banks, are located there
Beacon Hill	A neighborhood in Boston	The state government of Massachusetts
Beltway	The Capital Beltway, a ring road surrounding Washington, D.C.	The Federal government of the United States
Beverly Hills	Beverly Hills, California, a rich enclave of Los Angeles	Rich and famous people
Broadway	A street in Manhattan, New York City	Broadway theatre; sometimes, although less accurately, commercial American theatre in general
Capitol Hill or the Hill	A neighborhood in Washington, D.C.	The United States Congress
Cooperstown	A village in upstate New York	The National Baseball Hall of Fame and Museum, located in Cooperstown, New York
Columbine	An unincorporated community in Colorado	The Columbine High School massacre, or school shootings generally
Corner office	An office on a building corner with more windows	Corporate leadership (see above) or the office of the Governor of Massachusetts in the Massachusetts State House
Cupertino	A city in California	Apple Inc., whose headquarters are located there
Detroit	The largest city in Michigan	The American automobile industry
Fifth Avenue	A street in Manhattan, New York City	The upscale retailers that are generally located along it
The fifth floor	The floor of a building above the fourth floor	The Mayor of Chicago and their staff, since their offices are on that floor of the Chicago City Hall
Foggy Bottom	A neighborhood in Washington, D.C.	The United States Department of State
Hollywood	A district of Los Angeles, California	The American film industry
Houston	A city in Texas	NASA's Johnson Space Center, its Mission Control Center within, or NASA in general (from the call sign used by astronauts to contact Mission Control)
K Street	A street in downtown Washington, D.C.	The American lobbying industry
Langley	A small suburb of Washington, D.C., in Virginia	The U.S. Central Intelligence Agency
Madison Avenue	A street in Manhattan, New York City	The American advertising industry
Main Street	Shopping street of a town, traditionally the site of shops, banks, and local businesses	Local businesses or the "middle class" generally
Menlo Park	A city in California	Facebook (now Meta), whose headquarters are located there
Mountain View	A city in California	Google, whose headquarters are located there
Nashville	The capital of the U.S. state of Tennessee	The country music industry
Ottawa	The capital of Canada	The Government of Canada
Pearl Harbor	The natural harbor on the coast of Oahu island, Hawaii	The attack on Pearl Harbor by the Empire of Japan on 7 December 1941
Redmond	A town near Seattle, Washington	Microsoft, whose headquarters are located there
The Pentagon	A pentagonal building in Arlington County, Virginia	The United States Department of Defense (whose headquarters is housed by the Pentagon building)
Queen's Park	An urban park in downtown Toronto, Ontario, Canada	The Ontario Legislative Building (which is located within the park) and/or the provincial government of Ontario
Sand Hill Road	A street in Menlo Park, California	The venture capital firms that fund startups in the American high-tech industry
Sandy Hook	An elementary school in Newtown, Connecticut	The mass shooting at the school on 14 December 2012
Selma	Selma, Alabama	The U.S. civil rights movement or backlash against the movement
Seventh Avenue	A street in Manhattan, New York City	The American fashion industry
Silicon Valley	San Jose and its suburbs on the southwest side of San Francisco Bay	The American high-tech industry
Tin Pan Alley	A block along 28th Street in Manhattan	The American popular music industry in the late 19th and early 20th centuries
Wall Street	A street in Manhattan, New York City	The American financial markets or "big business" more generally
Washington	Washington, D.C., the capital of the United States	The federal government of the United States
Watergate	The Watergate Hotel and Office Building in Washington, D.C.	The political scandal exposed after a burglary at the Watergate Hotel
The White House	The official residence of the president of the United States	The Executive Office of the President of the United States (the president of the United States and staff)

=== South America ===
Word or phrase	Literal meaning	Metonymic meaning
Itamaraty	Itamaraty Palace in Brasília, former headquarters of the Ministry of External Relations of Brazil.	The Brazilian ministry of Foreign Affairs and its diplomats
Jonestown	A remote settlement established by the Peoples Temple cult in northwestern Guyana	The massacre which occurred on 18 November 1978 in which 918 people died

=== Oceania ===
Word or phrase	Literal meaning	Metonymic meaning
(The) Beehive	Headquarters of the government of New Zealand	New Zealand government leadership
The Bombay Hills	A range of hills south of Auckland	The cultural, social, and political division between Auckland and the rest of New Zealand
Canberra	The capital of Australia	The Government of Australia
Macquarie Street	Macquarie Street is the street where the parliament building sits.	The Government of New South Wales
Martin Place	Pedestrian mall in Sydney	Headquarters of the Reserve Bank of Australia
Spring Street	Spring Street is the street where the parliament building sits.	The Government of Victoria

== Numbers ==
Word or phrase	Literal meaning	Metonymic meaning
1/6, January 6, January 6th	The date January 6 (in American date format)	The January 6 United States Capitol attack
7/7	The date July 7	The 7 July 2005 London bombings
9/11, September 11, September 11th	The date September 11 (in American date format)	The September 11 attacks
