= The Beehive =

Executive wing of the New Zealand Parliament buildings

- Te Whare Mīere (Māori)
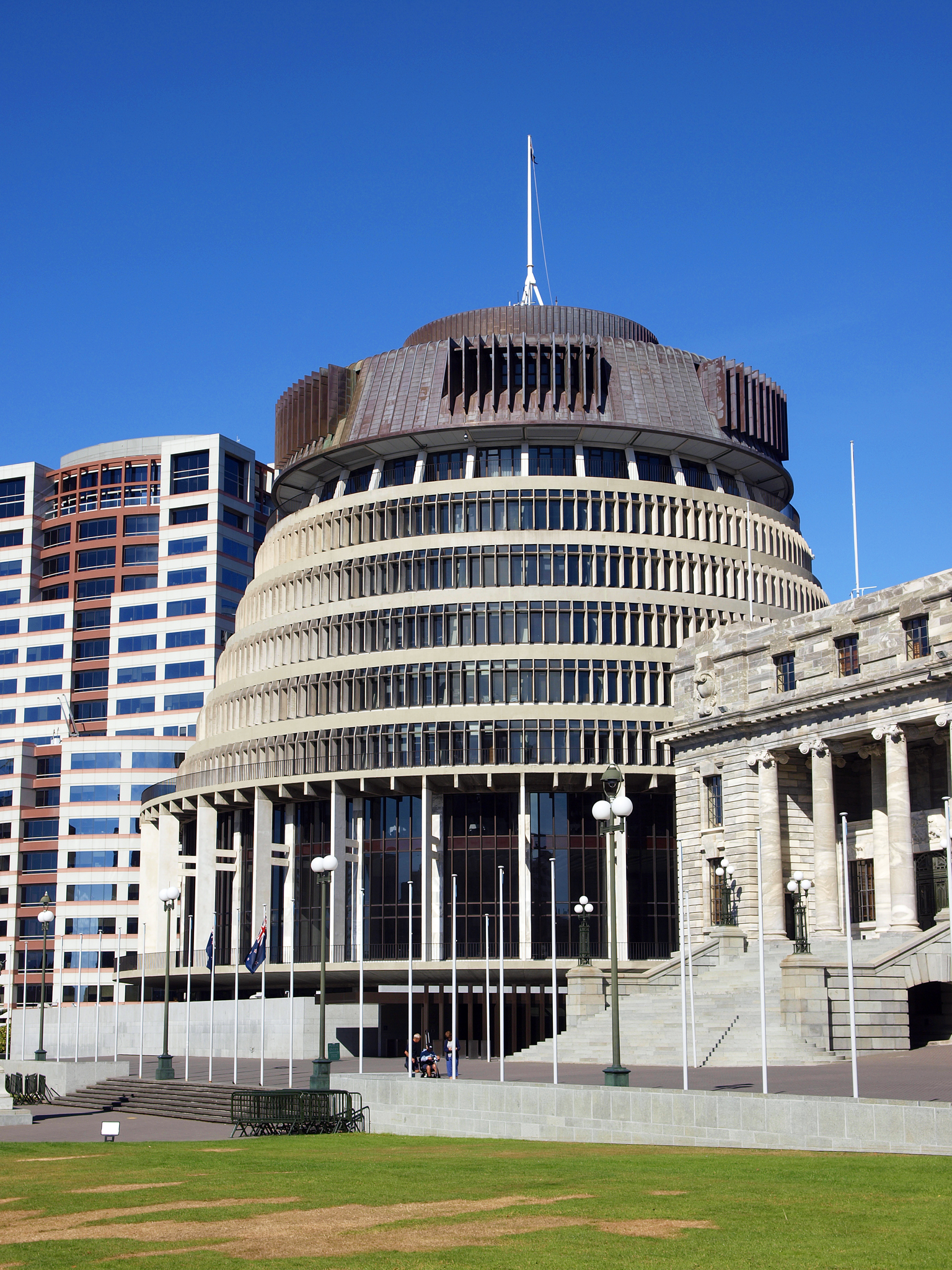
- Bowen House (left), the Beehive (centre) and Parliament (right). A very similar view of the latter two buildings features on New Zealand's $20 banknote.
- Alternative names: Executive Wing of the New Zealand Parliament Buildings

General information
- Location: Corner of Molesworth Street and Lambton Quay, Wellington
- Coordinates: 41.2784°S 174.7767°E
- Construction started: 1969
- Completed: 1981
- Inaugurated: May 1977
- Renovated: 1998–2006; 2013–2014
- Owner: Government of New Zealand

Height
- Height: 72 metres (236 ft)

Technical details
- Floor count: 10

Design and construction
- Architect: Basil Spence
- Structural engineer: Ministry of Works

Renovating team
- Architect: Warren and Mahoney

Website
- official website

Heritage New Zealand – Category 1
- Designated: 24 July 2015
- Reference no.: 9629

The Beehive (Māori: Te Whare Mīere) is the common name for the Executive Wing of the New Zealand Parliament Buildings, located at the corner of Molesworth Street and Lambton Quay, Wellington. It is so-called because its shape is reminiscent of that of a traditional woven form of beehive known as a skep. It is registered as a Category I heritage building by Heritage New Zealand.

Construction began in 1969 and was completed in 1981. Since 1979, the building has housed the offices of government ministers. Thus, the name "Beehive" is closely linked with the New Zealand Government. It is often used as a metonym for the New Zealand leadership at large, with "the 9th floor" specifically referring to the office of the prime minister, which is based on that floor. Cabinet meets on the top floor.

Since 1992 the Beehive has featured on the New Zealand twenty-dollar note. A survey commissioned by the Reserve Bank of New Zealand found that the Beehive is "a New Zealand icon and as such is readily recognisable".

== History ==
Before the Beehive was built, the site was occupied by Old Government House, a large wooden building built in 1868. Old Government House was home to Parliament from 1907 until 1918. In 1918 Parliament moved into the new Parliament House built beside Old Government House to replace an earlier building that had burned down. Old Government House then became home to Bellamy's restaurant.

The original plan for Parliament House had been for a symmetrical building with a wing on each side of the entrance, but only one wing was built. In the 1960s the government proposed an extension of Parliament House. Prime Minister Keith Holyoake wanted to complete the original plan and build the missing wing, but the government architect persuaded him to approve a modern building which would house parliamentary offices. One suggestion was for a 12 to 14-storey tower block.

In 1964, Scottish architect Basil Spence provided the original conceptual design of a round building rising in steps, which he dubbed "The Beehive" in reference to its shape and purpose as a hub or central point. Legend says that Spence drew the design on the back of a napkin while having dinner with Holyoake. Responding to criticism of his controversial concept, Spence said that he had been thinking about the design for months and it was not "a half-baked idea". A parliamentary committee approved Spence's sketch plans for the Beehive in June 1965, saying that the circular design provided functional efficiency and a high percentage of usable space, had a distinctive appearance and was in "broad harmony" with the legislative building. By this time, Spence was distancing himself from his design concept. The detailed architectural design was undertaken by the New Zealand Government Architect Fergus Sheppard. Sheppard retired in 1971, and succeeding government architects involved in the project were John Blake-Kelly, Frank Anderson, and Graydon Miskimmin. The Beehive's circular footprint is generally considered an elegant and distinctive design feature. However it also causes problems, as many of the rooms are wedge-shaped, curved or asymmetrical.

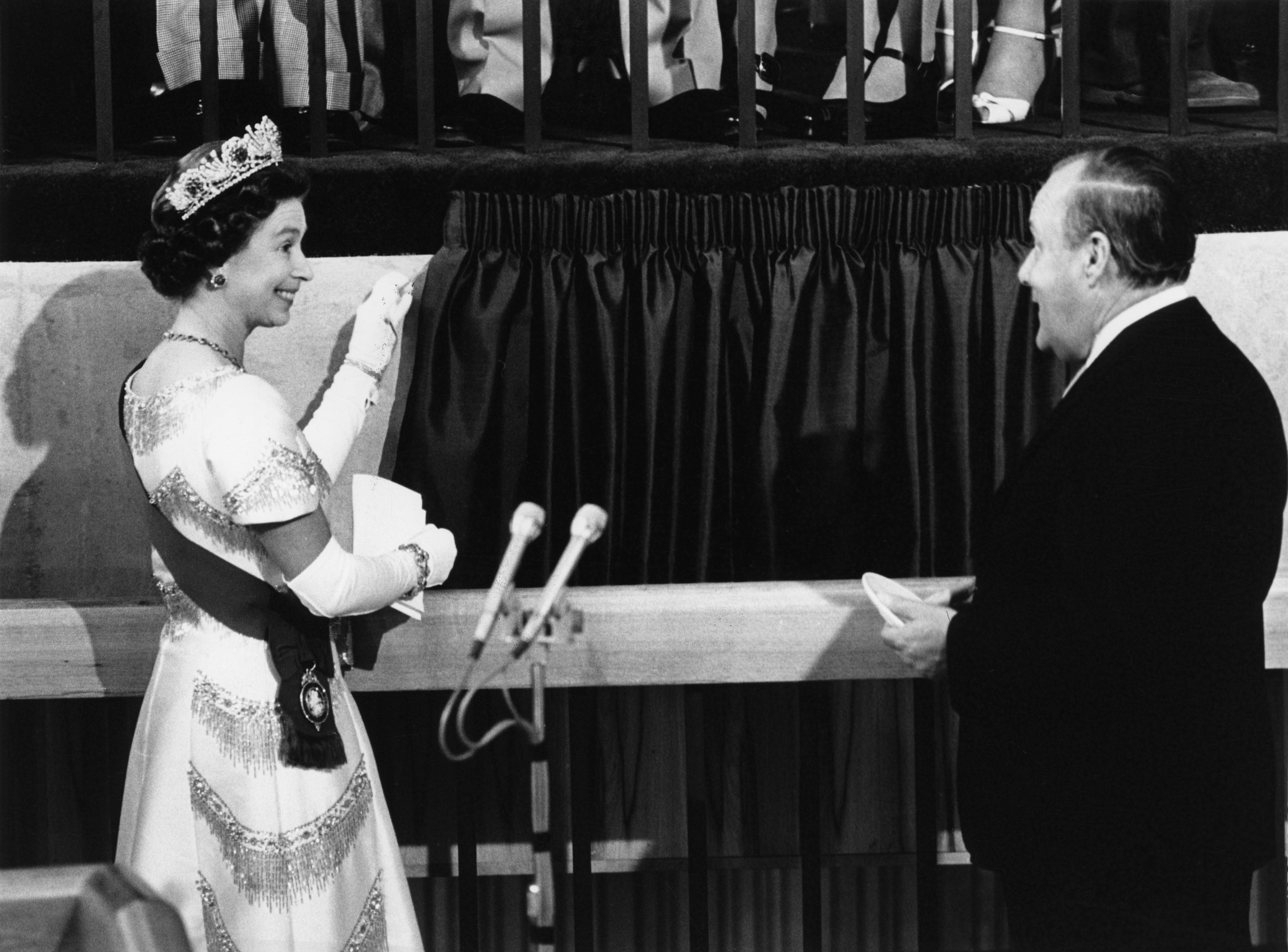
Queen Elizabeth II opening the Beehive, 28 February 1977

Old Government House was demolished in November 1969 to make way for the Beehive. W. M. Angus constructed the first stage, beginning in 1969 — the podium, underground car park and basement for a national civil defence centre. Gibson O'Connor Construction constructed the remaining ten floors of the building. Bellamy's catering facilities moved into the building in the summer of 1975–1976 and Elizabeth II, Queen of New Zealand, dedicated the building and unveiled a commemorative plaque in the reception hall in February 1977. The Prime Minister, Robert Muldoon, formally opened the building in May 1977. The Government moved into the upper floors in 1979. The annexe facing Museum Street was completed in 1981.

In the late 1990s, there was consideration of moving the Beehive behind Parliament House and finishing Parliament House according to the 1911 original plans. The plan was scuttled due to public outcry at the cost.

Renovations to the Beehive were carried out and the interior was modernised between 2001 and 2006 to plans by Christchurch architecture firm Warren and Mahoney. At this time an extension was built at the front to allow for a new security entrance, and a new, bomb-proof mail delivery room was built at the rear of the building. Much of the original interior design was lost during the renovation.

In 2013 and 2014, the roof was repaired and windows replaced.

In July 2015, Heritage New Zealand declared the Beehive "of outstanding heritage significance for its central role in the governance of New Zealand". Blyss Wagstaff of Heritage New Zealand called it "one of the most recognisable buildings in the country". Heritage New Zealand assigned the highest rating for a historic place, Category I, to the building. The original application for the heritage designation was made by Lockwood Smith, a former Speaker of the House of Representatives. The heritage registration became effective on 24 July 2015. A tunnel which extends from the Beehive to Bowen House was specifically excluded from the heritage registration. (Note: Harris, Catherine (11 July 2015). "Beehive declared historic place". The Press. p. A10.)

Refurbishment of the third floor took place in 2025, when Bellamy's and a bar were shifted to the ground floor to make way for ministerial suites and offices. The refurbishment project won several awards, including the 2026 New Zealand Institute of Architects Wellington Architecture Award for Interior Architecture.

In July 2026 it was announced by the Speaker of the House, Gerry Brownlee, that the Beehive might need to be vacated for up to 18 months for repairs to "ventilation systems, outside windows, and other structural aspects".

== Description ==
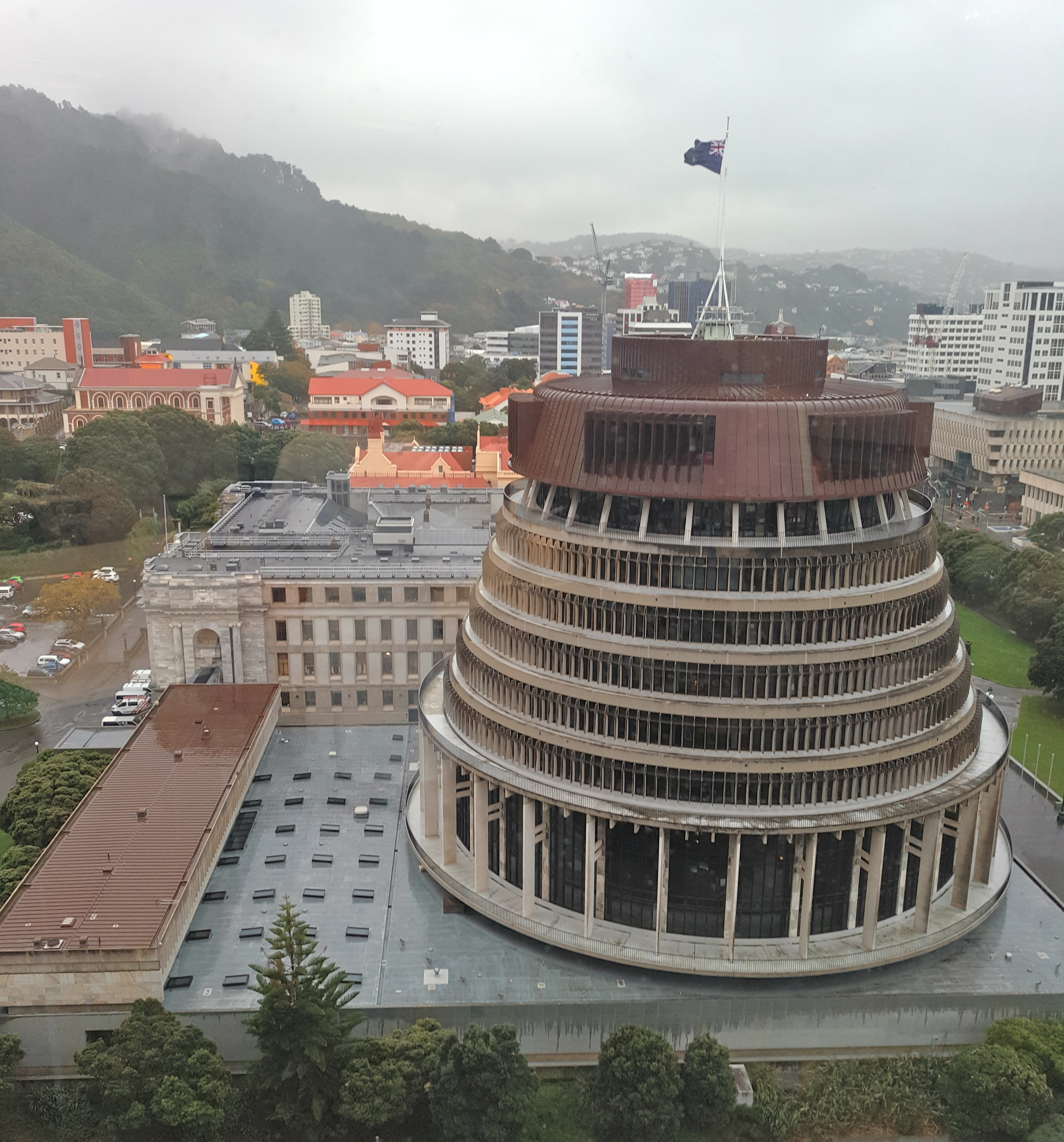
A view of the Beehive from above, showing the much larger structure at its base

The building is ten storeys (72 metres (236 ft)) high and has four floors below ground. New base-isolation techniques for the building were developed by Dr Bill Robinson. The building was balanced on 417 Robinson bearings using steel shims and layers of rubber that act as shock absorbers in an earthquake. (Robinson later developed lead/rubber bearings).

The Beehive's brown roof is made from 20 tonnes (44,000 lb) of hand-welded and seamed copper. It has developed a naturally weathered appearance.

The Beehive is connected to Parliament House by an atrium, and there is an underground passage running from the Beehive under Bowen Street to Bowen House, a 22-storey office building on the corner of Lambton Quay and Bowen Street that was leased by Parliament in 1991 to house some members of parliament and government staff. The underground passage originally had travelators, but due to aging parts and reduced foot traffic, the travelators were decommissioned in August 2025. The passage remains open to parliamentary staff walking between the Beehive and Bowen House.

The upper floors of the Beehive contains offices for members of parliament. Other facilities within the building include function rooms; a theatrette which is commonly used for government press conferences; a banquet hall; a gym and a swimming pool.

There have been various catering facilities in the Beehive since it opened, including bars for members and their guests. Bellamy's restaurant was moved to the ground floor in 2024 to make way for offices. Pickwicks bar (also known as 3.2 due to its position in the building on the third floor and second corridor) closed in 2024 because the space was needed for offices. It was replaced by a new bar named Pint of Order which opened in 2025 on the ground floor and seats 30. Copperfield's café on the first floor serves parliamentary staff and is also open to the public when Parliament is not sitting. A coffeeshop named The Beanhive operated for a few years until it closed in 2012.

The building also houses, in its basement, the country's National Crisis Management Centre and a carpark for staff and visitors.

The publicly-accessible entrance foyer's core is decorated with marble floors, stainless steel mesh wall panels, columns clad in Tākaka marble and a translucent glass ceiling.

In 2009, Virtualtourist placed the Beehive in third place on a list of "the world's ugliest buildings".

=== Offices ===
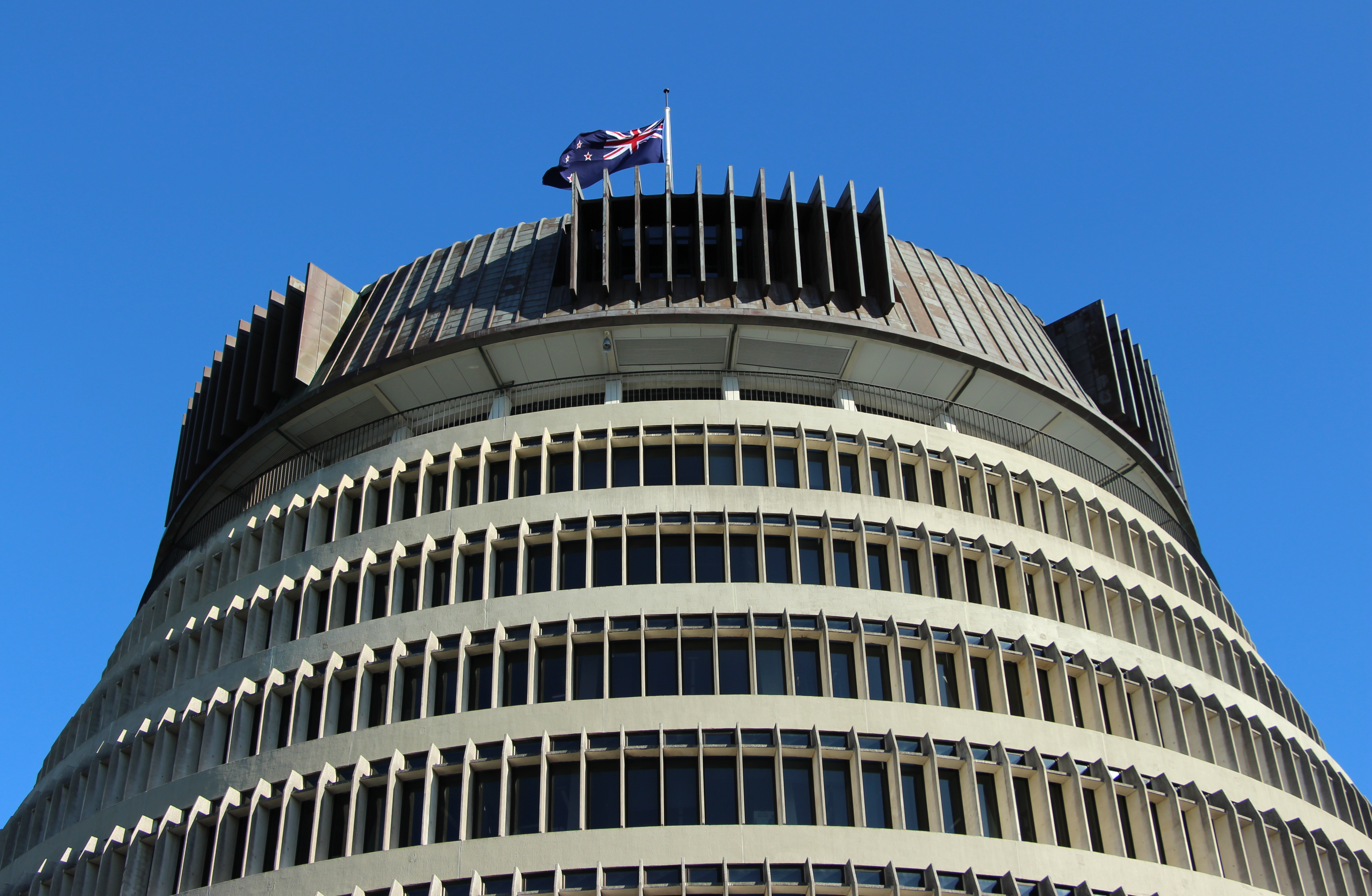
The upper floors of the Beehive house the Cabinet and the Prime Minister's office

The top floor is occupied by the Cabinet room, with the prime minister's offices directly beneath on the ninth floor (and part of the eighth). The upper portion of the Beehive also contains the offices of other ministers; senior ministers are situated in proximity to the prime minister's office according to their ranking in Cabinet. The seniority of a minister is reflected in how far up the building they are. Some ministers, especially junior ministers, are based in Bowen House.

=== Banquet Hall ===
The Banquet Hall on the first floor is reached via a marble staircase from the ground floor. It is the largest function room in the parliamentary complex, able to hold 300 seated guests or 500 standing guests. The Banquet Hall extends around the curve of the building: when the Beehive was opened there was criticism that many guests would have to sit with their backs to the guests of honour. The main kitchen is located on the ground floor, which means that food has to be transported to the Banquet Hall by lift. This led to criticism that was it difficult to keep the food hot or maintain a steady service to guests.

=== Art work ===
The Beehive is extensively decorated with New Zealand art and was designed to showcase the country's creative artists. On the inner wall of the Banquet Hall is a mural by John Drawbridge 42 metres (138 ft) long and 4.8 metres (16 ft) high portraying the atmosphere and sky of New Zealand. The foyer contains a textile wall hanging Forest in the Sun by Joan Calvert and Guy Ngan which was commissioned for the building. It was hung in 1977 when the Queen opened the building, removed in 2003 during refurbishments and re-hung in 2023.

== Public access ==
The ground floor of the Beehive is open to the public. A visitor centre located on the ground floor offers various free tours that enable visitors to see other parts of the Beehive and Parliament Building. Tours were suspended in 2020 to limit the spread of COVID-19, but the public gallery and select committee meetings remained open to the public. As of 2024, more than 90,000 people visit the Beehive each year.

== Photo gallery ==
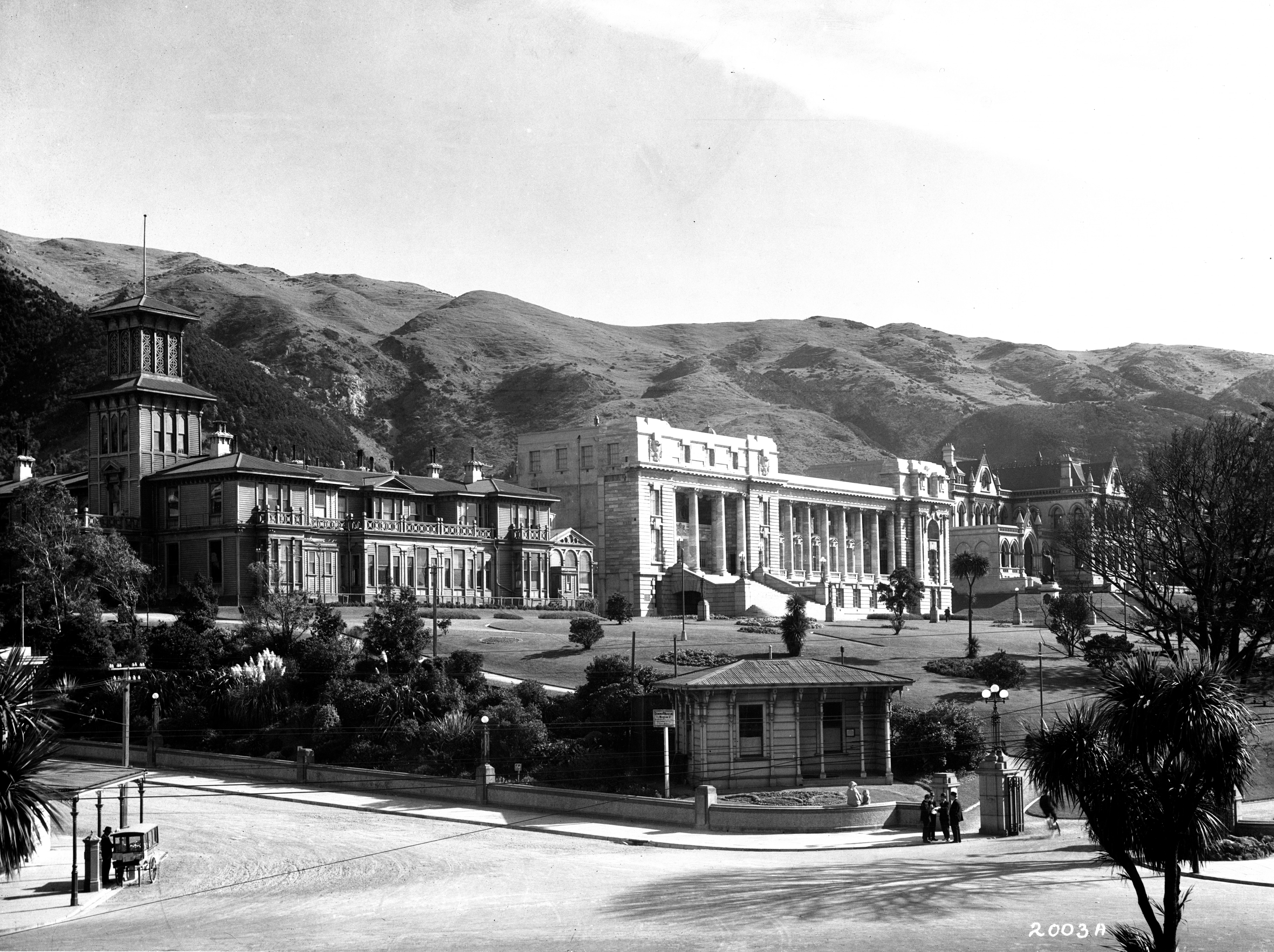
Old Government House and Parliament House, c. 1928. The Beehive replaced Old Government House.

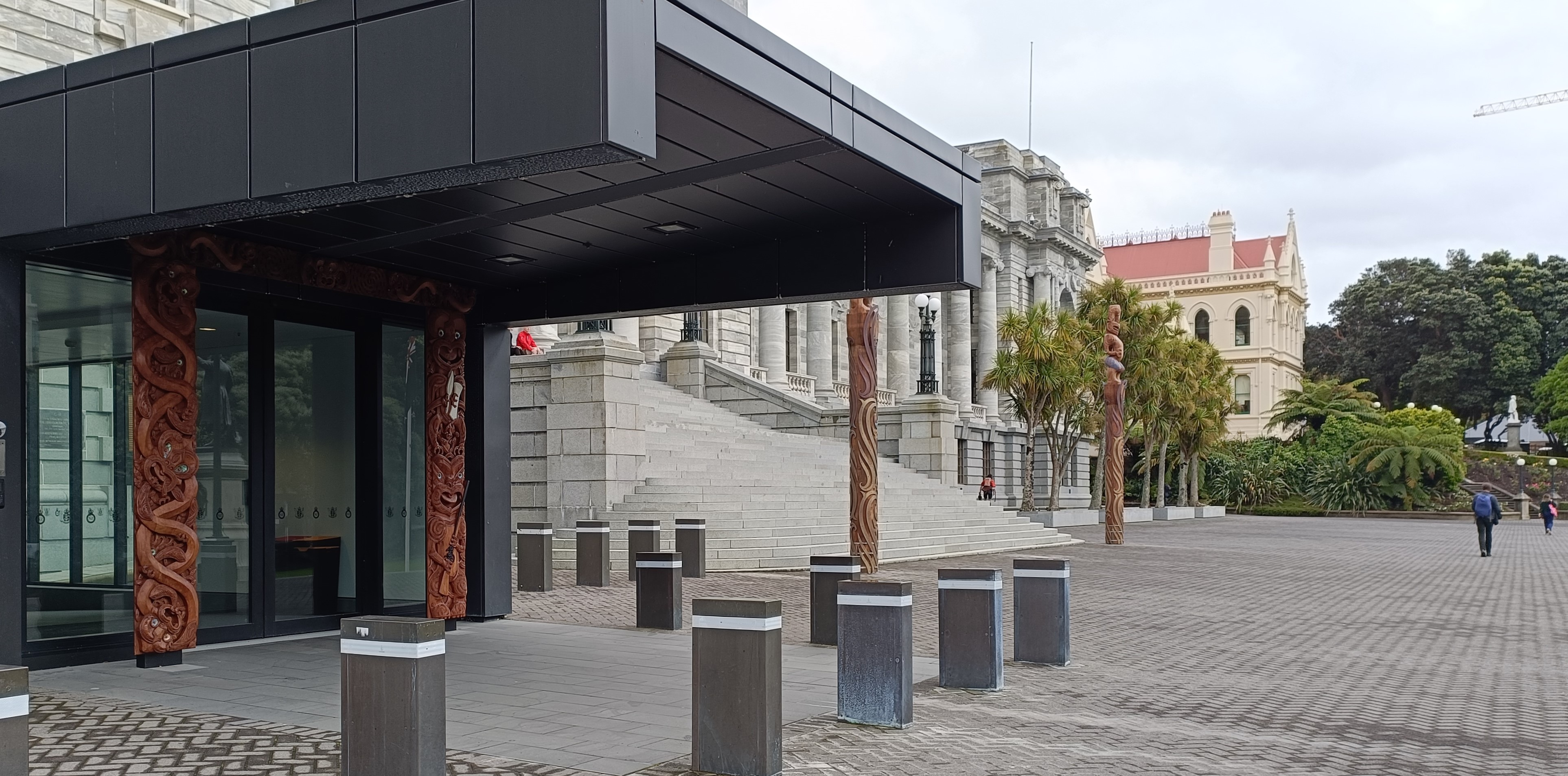
Entrance to the Beehive

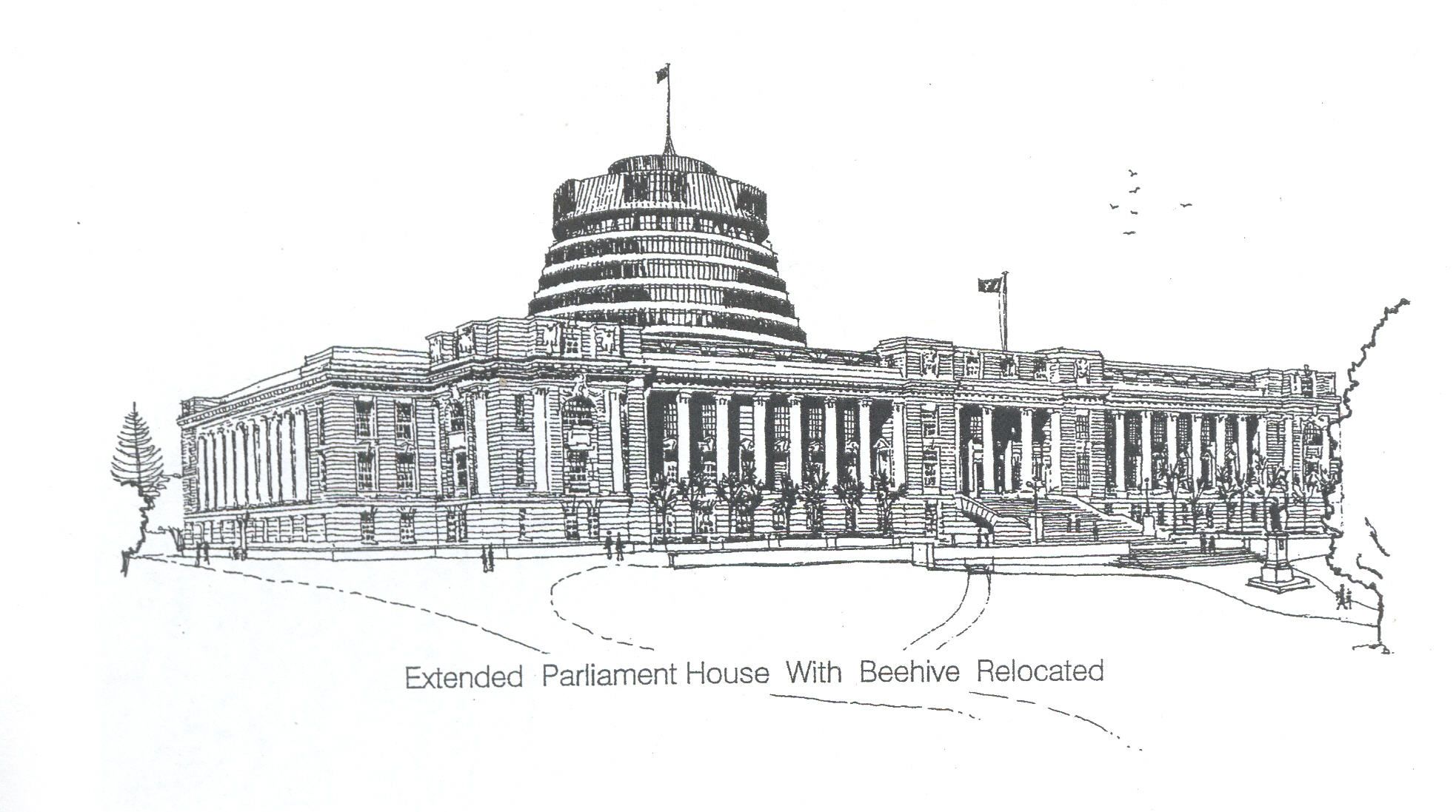
Proposal to shift the Beehive behind a completed Parliament House

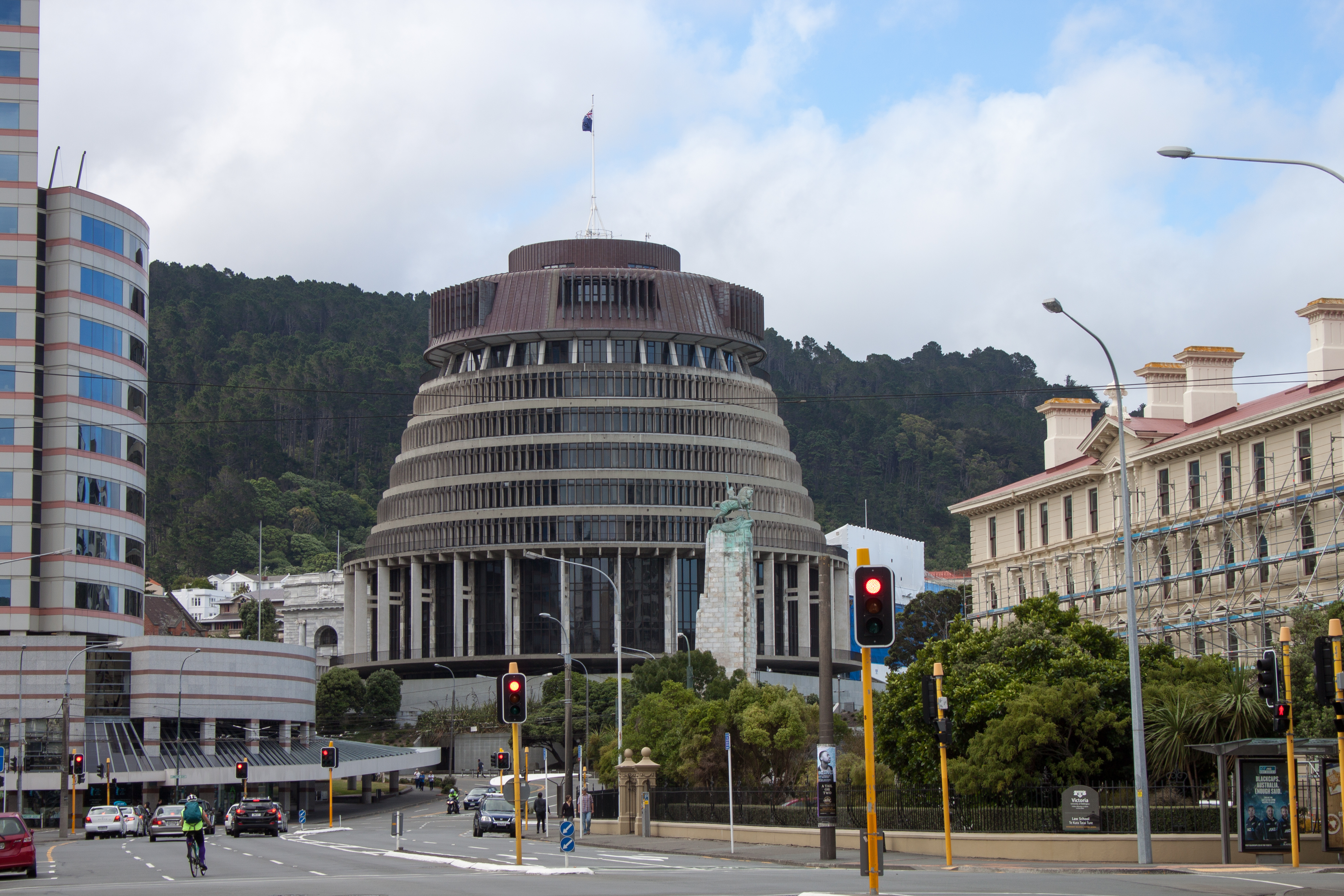
The Beehive viewed from the south. Bowen House to the left and Old Government Buildings to the right.
