= Tākaka marble =

Type of marble quarried in New Zealand

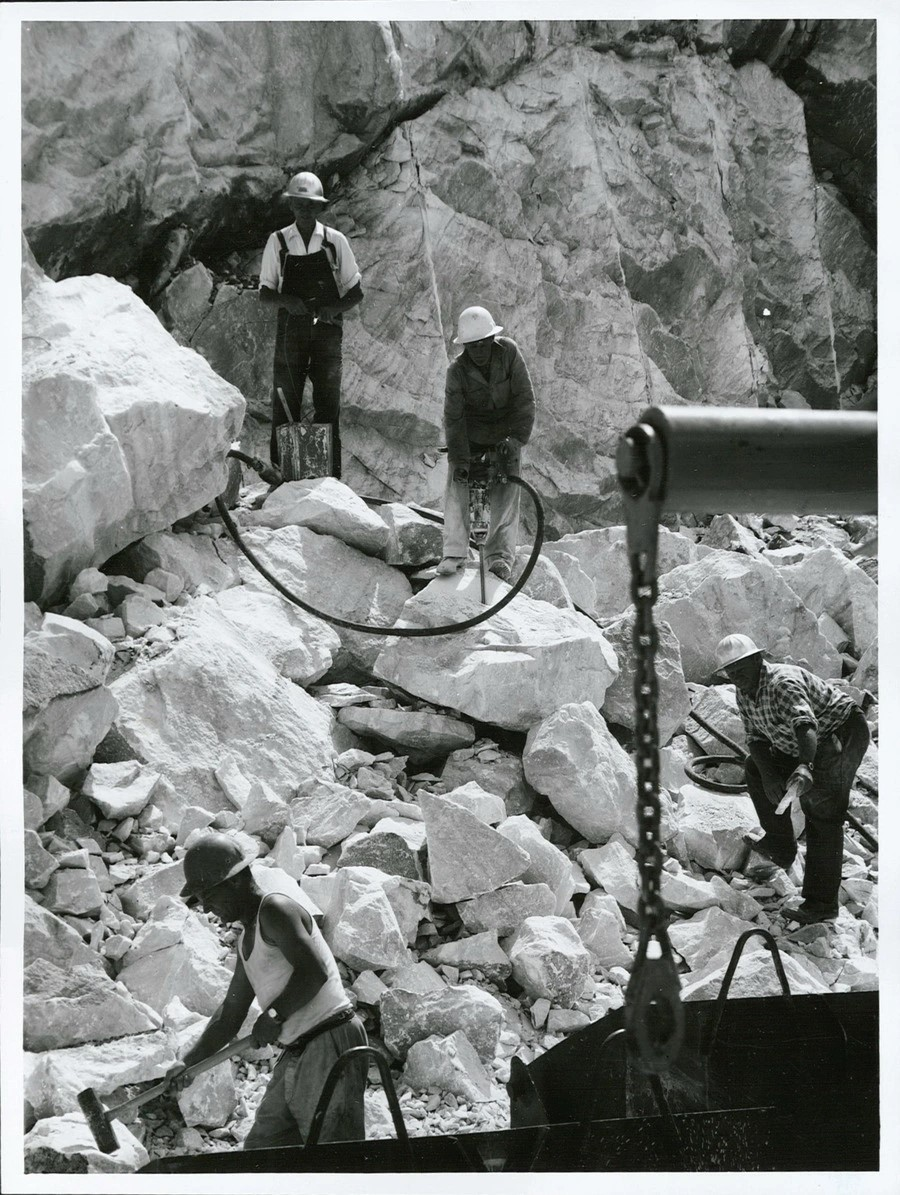
Quarrying marble at Kairuru quarry 1967

Tākaka marble (also known as Kairuru marble) is a marble found in the area around Tākaka in the northern South Island of New Zealand. It comes from number of quarries on Tākaka Hill and the Holyoake Valley nearby, which form part of the Tākaka terrane.

Impurities differ from place to place. Each of the quarries producing "Tākaka marble" thus gives a differently coloured marble, ranging from white to pink or grey, and sometimes almost black. Kairuru marble is a coarse-grained marble which polishes to a lustrous finish.

Quarrying began at Kairuru (on the southeastern, Nelson side of the hill) in the early 1900s, and in 1911 was chosen for use in Wellington’s Parliament Buildings. No blasting was involved in getting the marble.The heavy marble blocks for the parliament were transported via a tramline down a steep hillside for 10.4 kilometres (6.5 mi) to Mārahau, where they were loaded onto scows, to be taken to Wellington for cutting. A total of 5000 tonnes of marble had been quarried at Kairuru by the time of completion of the Parliament Buildings in 1922.

Later, the same quarry provided marble for the Massey Memorial in Wellington, and for decorative features in the Beehive in the 1970s, and for Christ Church Cathedral in Nelson.

The new Kairuru quarry, in the Holyoake Valley, had become the main producer by 2005. It produces a coarse, crystalline marble with orange veins and irregular staining, and is chiefly used for sculpture.

Ngarua quarry is known for white, orange, grey marble and golden calcite, but much of the marble from this quarry was used to make crushed lime. Pink marble came from a quarry in the lower Riuwaka Valley, while grey marble came from the Marble Mountain Quarry above Kairuru.

== Gallery ==
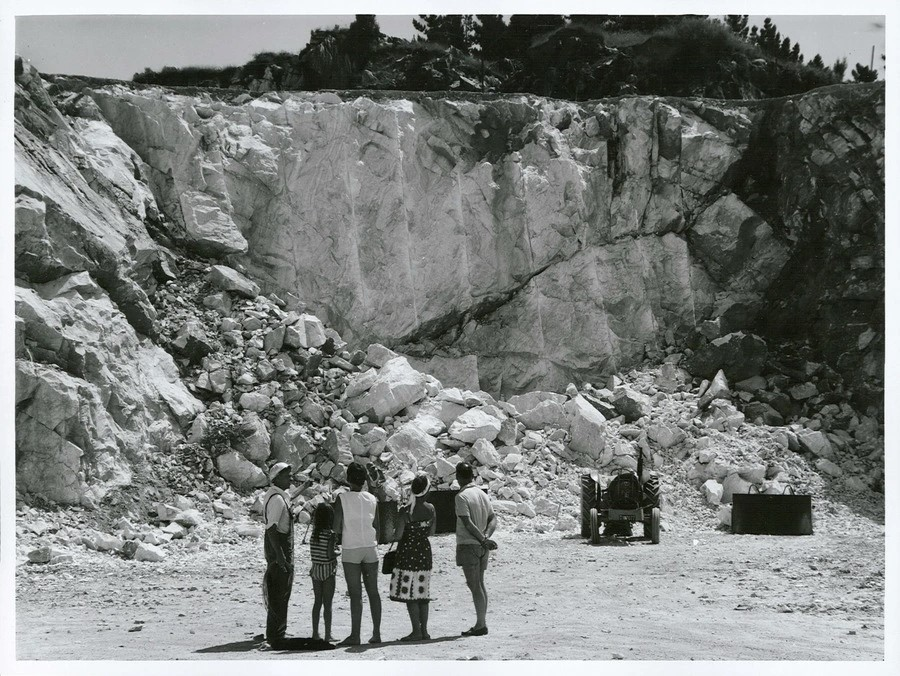
Kairuru quarry

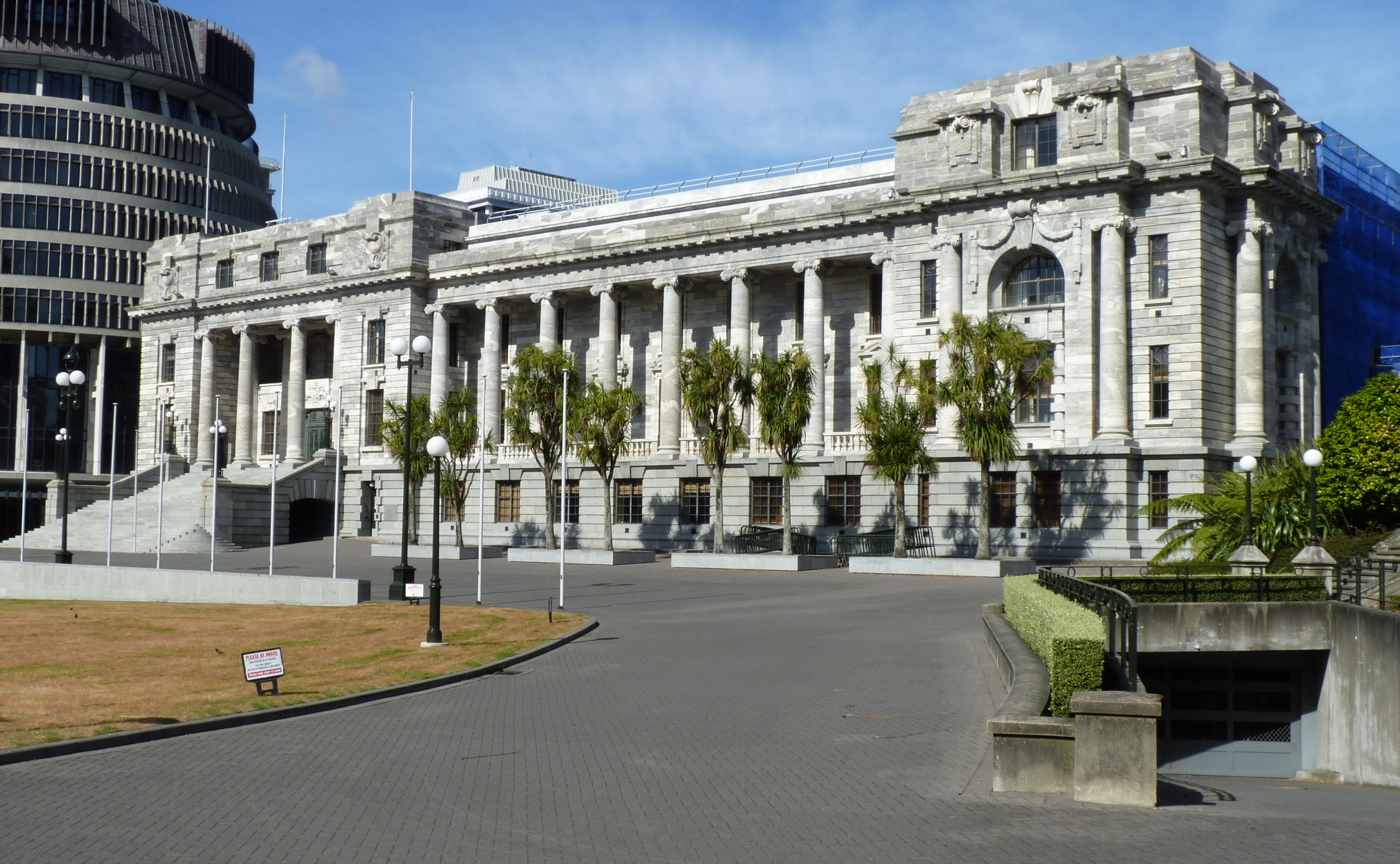
Parliament House, Wellington

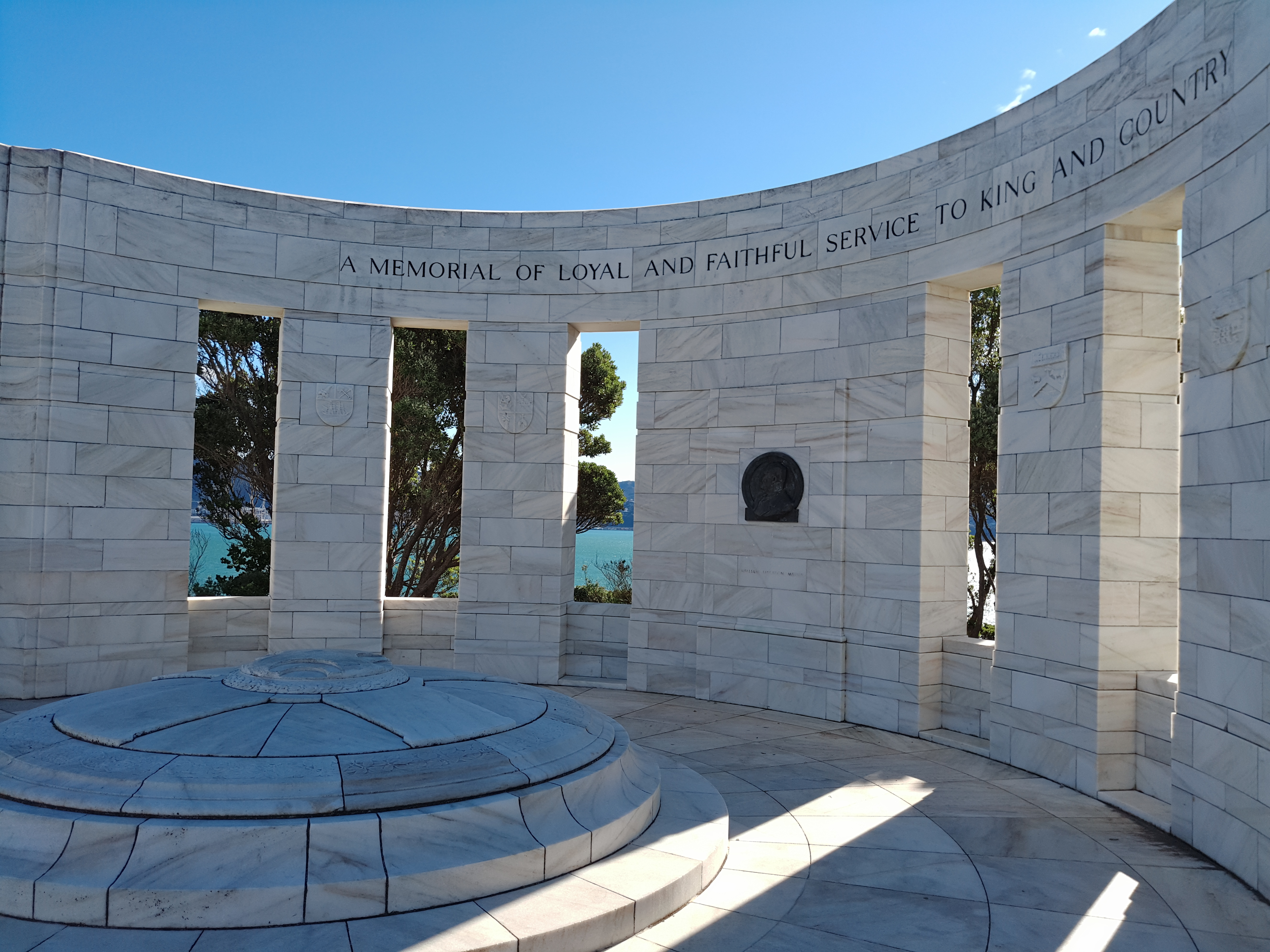
Massey Memorial, Wellington

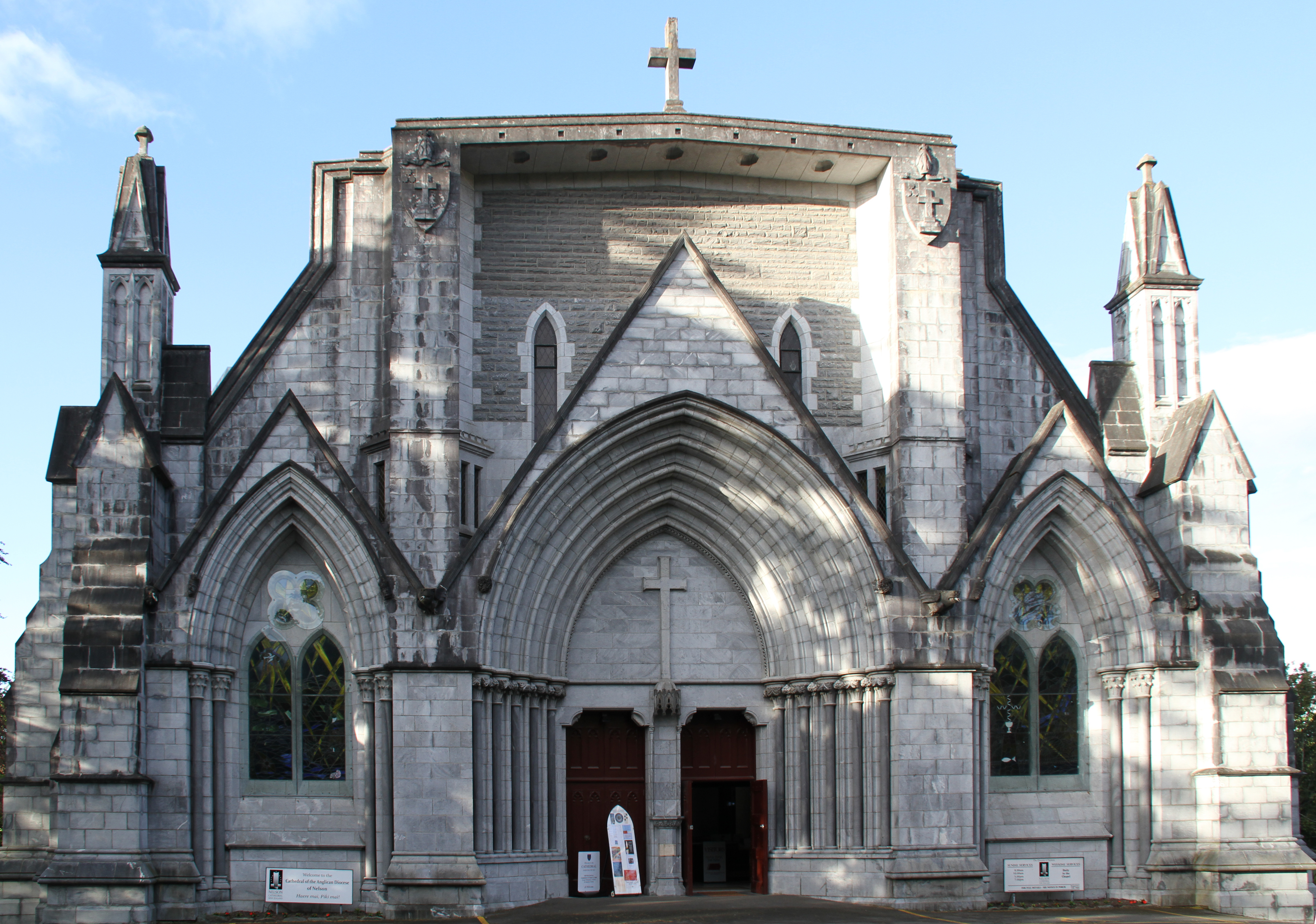
Christ Church Cathedral, Nelson
