= Bowen House =

Tower in Wellington, New Zealand

Coordinates: 41°16′45.68″S 174°46′35.91″E

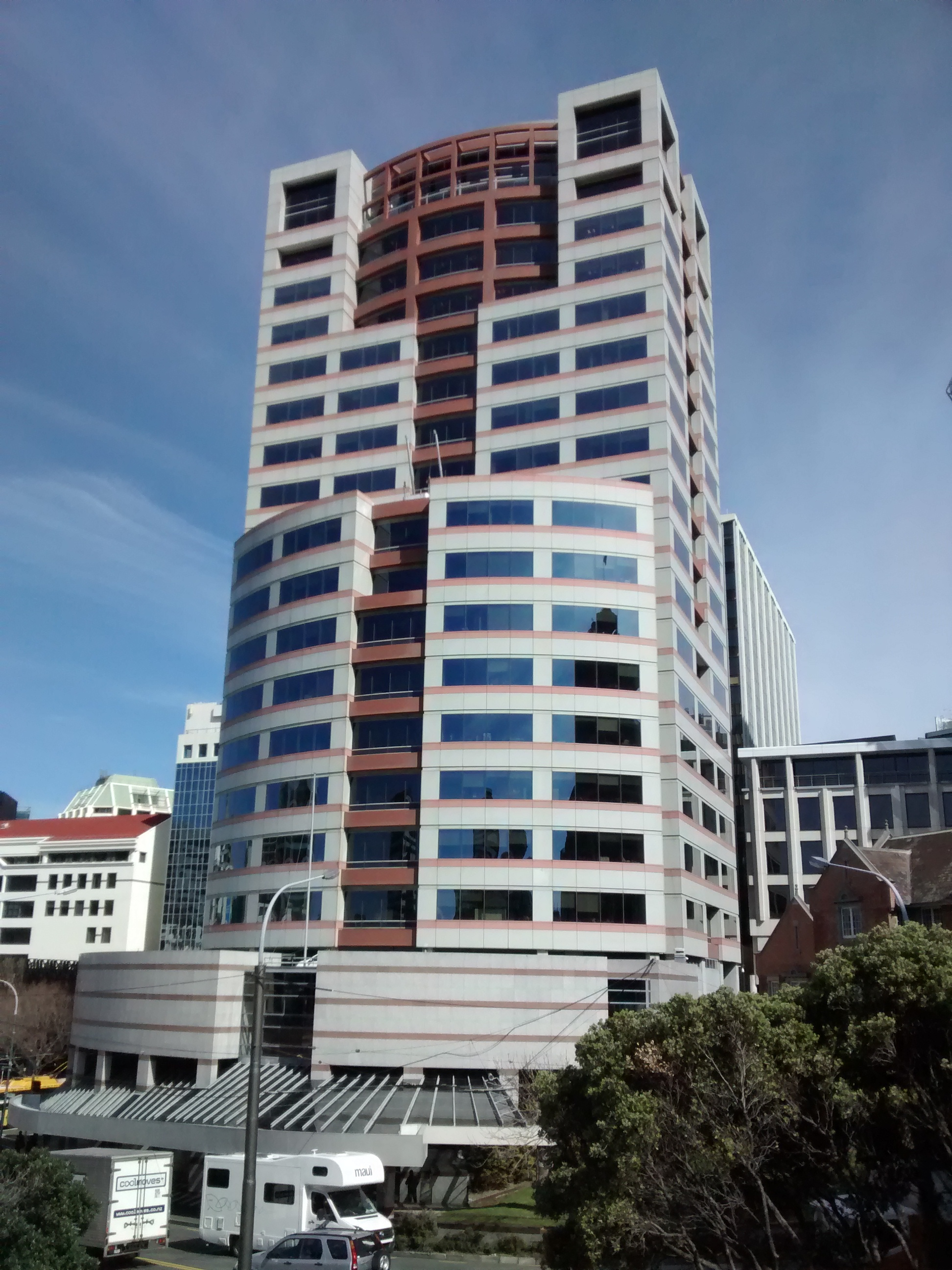
Te Iho, viewed from the Beehive walkway

Te Iho (formerly Bowen House) is a 22-storey office building on the corner of Lambton Quay and Bowen Street, Wellington, New Zealand, that was leased by the New Zealand Parliament to house some members of Parliament and government staff. It houses various government agencies.

== History ==
Te Iho replaced a brick building that was also known as Bowen House at the same site, opened in 1931 and demolished in the 1980s.

The new Te Iho (Bowen House) was originally to be known as Kingsway. The building was designed by Warren and Mahoney architects. Construction began in 1988 and was completed in 1990. It was leased by the New Zealand Parliament from 1991 to 2020. From 1991 to 1995, while Parliament House and the Parliamentary Library were earthquake-strengthened and refurbished, MPs of the House of Representatives met in a temporary debating chamber at Te Iho (Bowen House).

The building was once owned by Government Property Services, which was privatised as Capital Properties New Zealand by a National–New Zealand First coalition government in 1998. In 2012, AMP Capital sold the building to Farhad Vladi, a German property investor.

Te Iho (Bowen House) contained offices for the smaller political parties, select committee staff, and some ministers and their support staff. It was connected to the Executive Wing (the Beehive) of the Parliament Buildings by an underground passage containing travelators under Bowen Street. Ministers moving between buildings on the travelators could not avoid journalists, who used the opportunity to ask ministers questions. Te Iho (Bowen House) was part of the parliamentary security system, and the government was the only tenant in the building.

Some high-rise buildings in Wellington suffered damage in the November 2016 Kaikōura earthquake, notably Statistics House where some floors partially collapsed after separating from the walls. In December 2016, Wellington City Council ordered that building inspections be carried out in about 80 buildings including Te Iho (Bowen House). (By 2022 the Council had identified 150 buildings at possible risk.) The buildings affected by the order were all multi-storey, constructed of reinforced concrete with precast hollow core concrete slab floors.

In May 2019 engineers began investigating Bowen House, and in October 2019 Speaker of the House Trevor Mallard announced that engineers did not believe Te Iho (Bowen House) was fully safe and that staff would be temporarily relocated so that the building could be strengthened. By February 2020, plans were underway to shift 600 staff after the building was declared to only reach 40% of the new building code. In 2021 Precinct Properties bought Te Iho (Bowen House) for $92 million, with plans to earthquake-strengthen and redevelop the building. Strengthening was completed during 2023.

The building reopened as Te Iho in 2025, providing offices for 10 government bodies. Due to aging parts and reduced foot traffic, the travelators were decommissioned in August 2025, with the passage remaining open to unassisted foot traffic.
