= Corner office =

Office located in the corner of a building

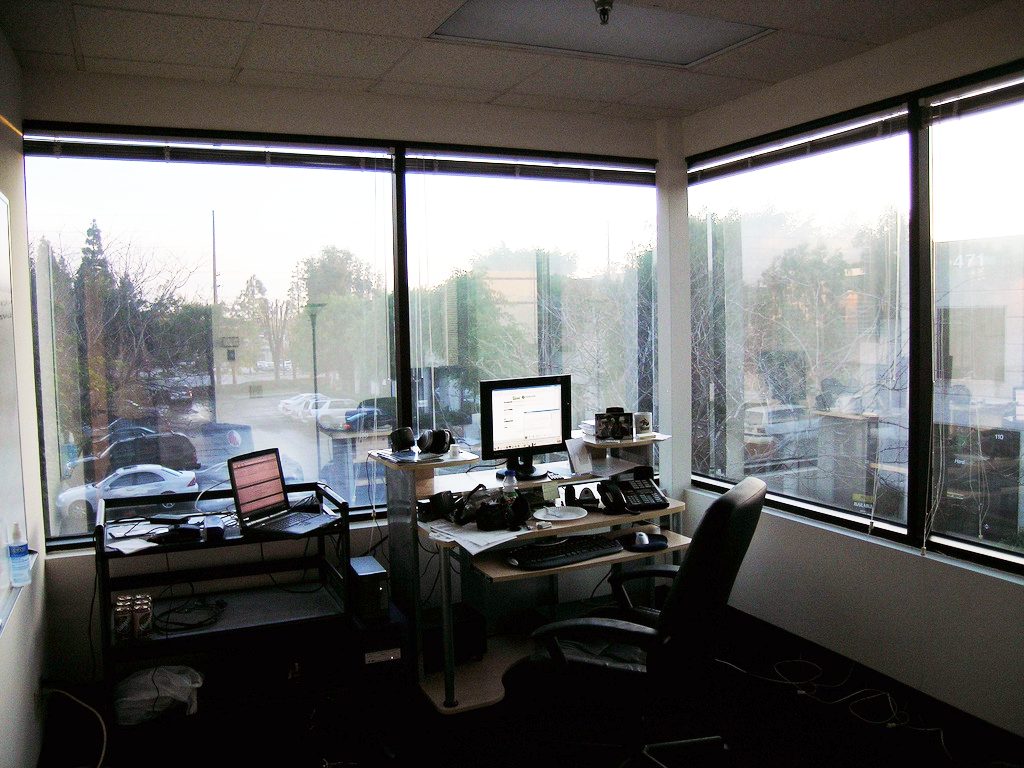
A corner office in Brea, California

A corner office is an office that is located in the corner of a building. Corner offices are considered desirable because they have windows on two exterior walls, as opposed to a typical office with only one window or none at all (windowless offices occupying a corner of a building are therefore not typically considered "corner offices").

As corner offices are often given to the most senior executives, the term primarily refers to top management positions or the "C-Suite", such as the chief executive officer (CEO), chief operating officer (COO), or chief financial officer (CFO). In organizations which do not use this corporate hierarchy, such as law firms and political parties, the corner office generally refers to the most senior partners or officials who are involved with corporate governance.

== Uses ==
- Corner Office, in Massachusetts, is a term used in the press as a metonym for the state's governor, based on the location of the governor's official office on the third floor of the state house; it corresponds to the usage of "governor's mansion" in other states or "the White House" for the federal executive branch, but Massachusetts does not provide its governor with an official residence.
- CNBC's show Kudlow & Company had a recurring segment entitled "The Corner Office," in which various corporate executives are profiled.
- The Wall Street Journal's Law Blog runs a series titled "Associate Advice from the Corner Office" where top executives in legal firms give tips to recent graduates.
- American Public Media's Marketplace radio program has a recurring segment, Conversations from the Corner Office, which interviews CEOs from companies in various sectors.
- Richard Conniff has written a book titled Ape in the Corner Office in which he applies theories from evolutionary biology and sociobiology to concepts of management in workplaces.
- Corner Office Bedroom is a song by PlayRadioPlay!.
- The law-drama Suits makes numerous references to the corner office, highlighting the prestige having one conveys.
- Corner Office is a 2022 black comedy film directed by Joachim Back and starring Jon Hamm
