= Federalism in China =

Flag used by Chen Jiongming's army, sometimes used to represent the movement

Federalism in China is a term for the collective proposals, political movements and scholarly writings concerning the division of power between China's central government, and its provinces or other regional entities. Chinese Federalism is used in four overlapping definitions.

First, Chinese Federalism describes the "liansheng zizhi", or 聯省自治 "federal self-government" movement that emerged after the 1911 Revolution. This revolutionary movement peaked in the early 1920's, during a period known as the Warlord Era, when intellectuals and local provincial leaders advocated for a federation of self-governing provinces. Second, the term refers to the federal ideas advanced by other groups, including the Chinese Communist Party before 1949. Third, economists use "Chinese-style" federalism to refer to the transfer of economic authority from the Chinese central government to local governments since 1978. Finally, scholars have proposed theoretical federal arrangements to address the status of regions peripheral to the central Chinese government, such as Hong Kong, Taiwan and Macau.

An early Republic of China stamp (1912) carried the English name "United Provinces of China"

Wu Bangguo, former number two official in China's leadership structure, stated in 2011 that there would be no federal system in China. He said: "There will be no separation of powers between the different branches of government and no federal system. It is possible that the state could sink into the abyss of internal disorder [if this happened]."

== Republic-era proposals ==
The Revive China Society, founded in November 1894 by Sun Yat-sen, was among the first to suggest that a future Chinese government should be established on federal lines—a feeling expressed in the organization's oath, "Expel the northern barbarians, revive Zhōnghuá, and establish a unified (hézhòng) government". The term hézhòng, literally meaning "many unified as one", refers to a federal structure such as the United States.

During the Xinhai Revolution of 1911, fourteen provinces proclaimed independence from the Qing dynasty and reunited as the Republic of China. But when the Guizhou Provincial Consultative Council proclaimed independence, they asked to build the Great Han Federal Democratic Republic. Prior to January 1912, one semi-official translation of the country's new name used by the revolutionary Shanghai Military Government was the United Provinces of China. Sun Yat-sen's title in 1912 was "President of the Provisional Government of the United Provinces of China". Chinese federalists from this period often used "United Provinces" instead of "Federation" or "United States" because "states" suggested a more independent arrangement than "provinces." In other words, they wished to avoid the impression that federalism implied separatism. A major proponent of federalism was the Guangdong politician Chen Jiongming.

Proposals for a federal Chinese state were first advanced in the 1920s, but these proved unpopular. These often used the phrase United Autonomous Provinces as the name of the intended system. Hunan was the center of this movement. The young Mao Zedong even advocated the formation of a "Republic of Hunan" during that period. But many intellectuals, including Sun Yat-sen, argued that these proposals would limit the ability of China to fight off external invasion and would legitimize the rule of warlords. By the 1920s, Sun categorically rejected federalism. The young Mao Zedong wrote on the Ta Kung Pao proposing the idea of splitting the whole China into 27 countries. He wrote︰

...中國呢？也覺醒了（除開政客官僚，軍閥）。九年假共和大戰亂的經驗，迫人不得不覺醒，知道全國的總建設在一個期內完全無望，最好辦法，是索性不謀總建設，索性分裂去謀各省的分建設，實行「各省人民自決主義」』二十二行省，三特區，兩藩地，合共二十七個地方，最好分為二十七國。

湖南呢？至於我們湖南，尤其三千萬人個個應該覺醒了。湖南人沒有別的法子，唯一的法子，是湖南自決自治，是湖南人在湖南地域建設一個「湖南共和國」。我曾著實想過，救湖南救中國，圖與全世界解放的民族攜手，均非這樣不行，湖南人沒有把湖南自建為國的決心和勇氣，湖南終究是沒辦法。 ...

"...What about China? It's also awakening (Except politicians, bureaucrats, warlords). Nine years of false republic, wars and chaos forced people to be awake. Knowing that this country is completely hopeless in rebuilding itself as a whole. The best way now is of "Self-determination within each provinces". There would be twenty-two provinces, three SARs, and two vassal territories.....a total of twenty-seven states, preferably divided into twenty-seven countries.

What about Hunan? As for our Hunan, especially 30 millions people here should be awakened by now. There is only one way and that is the self-determination and autonomy of Hunan. A "Hunan Republic" should be established by the Hunanese in the Hunan region. I have really thought about saving both China and Hunan, trying to join hands with the other liberated nations in the world. But this seem like impossible by now. If the people of Hunan did not have the determination and courage to establish their own country, then there is nothing we can do to help Hunan..."

== Communist-era developments ==
After Chinese Communists established the Chinese Soviet Republic in Jiangxi, they aimed at a political system modeled after the union republics of the Soviet Union. According to their plans, China was to be a Soviet federal republic with several autonomous republics (such as Mongolia, Xinjiang, and Tibet). During the period of the Long March they established a small autonomous republic for Tibetans in Sichuan. In Shaanxi, however, they changed their nationality policy, abandoning their plan to establish autonomous republics (as in the Soviet Union) in favor of autonomous regions. The first of these to be created was the Inner Mongolia Autonomous Region in 1947.

After the People's Republic of China was founded in 1949, provinces were arranged into six greater administrative areas. These six administrative areas function as parts of a whole, with the central Chinese government reigning as the primary authority. These greater administrative areas were disbanded shortly after, in 1954. After this the provinces were governed directly by the central government in Beijing

More recently, some economists have argued that during the process of the reform and opening up that the People's Republic has evolved into a de facto federal state in which provinces have wide discretion to implement policy goals which are set by the PRC central government and in which provinces and localities actively compete with each other in order to advance economically. According to a 2004 study conducted by Bo Zhiyue, Chair of the Department of International Studies at the St. John Fisher College, provincial authorities have greater institutional power than central institutions. Bo concluded that after the 16th Party Congress, due to personnel transfers between the provinces and the centre, the central authorities emerged more powerful, but was still shy of outpowering the provincial authorities on his power index score.

== Future proposals ==
In 2004, Lin Chong-Pin, former deputy Minister of Defense of the Republic of China, said that a think tank in Beijing or Shanghai gave a proposal for United Republics of China. None of this proposal has become public. But in the same years the officials and think-tanks of the People's Republic of China have often shown an interest in the 1964 merger of mainland Tanganyika and the archipelago of Zanzibar to form the United Republic of Tanzania.

In 2011, Li Yi-hu, director of Institute of International Politics, University of Peking, said that Tanzania and Zanzibar, the model of "One country, two constitutions", could be referring to "One China, two constitutions". In February 2011, China Review News published an article about the Tanzanian style of Chinese unification.

=== Charter 08 ===
Charter 08, co-written by the formerly incarcerated human rights activist and Nobel Peace Prize winner Liu Xiaobo calls for the establishment of a Chinese "Federal Republic". The relevant proposal states:

"A Federated Republic. A democratic China should seek to act as a responsible major power contributing toward peace and development in the Asian Pacific region by approaching others in a spirit of equality and fairness. In Hong Kong and Macau, we should support the freedoms that already exist. With respect to Taiwan, we should declare our commitment to the principles of freedom and democracy and then, negotiating as equals and ready to compromise, seek a formula for peaceful unification. We should approach disputes in the national-minority areas of China with an open mind, seeking ways to find a workable framework within which all ethnic and religious groups can flourish. We should aim ultimately at a federation of democratic communities of China."

As of late 2010, Charter 08 has already been signed by more than 10,000 people both inside and outside China.

Large economic ties between China and Taiwan have also motivated the occasional informal use of the term to describe a united China.

The introduction of Special Economic Zones since the 1980s have led to the development of several distinct regional economies within the People's Republic of China, such as the Pearl River Delta, Yangtze River Delta, and the Bohai Rim. Several of these regions have economies the size of small developed nations. Some scholars who use the term United States of China argue that during the process of the reform and opening up the People's Republic has evolved into a de facto federal state in which these economic regions have wide discretion to implement policy goals which are set by the PRC central government and in which provinces and localities actively compete with each other in order to advance economically.

=== Federal Republic of China ===
A Federal Republic of China is a proposed future federal republic encompassing mainland China (and its provinces), Macau, Hong Kong, and Taiwan. This "Third Republic" (following on from the Republic of China and the People's Republic of China) is proposed by supporters of the Tibet independence movement, although it would not in effect create an independent Tibet. Yan Jiaqi, writing for the Tibetan government-in-exile, has written that:

"It would be a federation with the characteristics of a confederation. Federal China would consist of two kinds of republics: 'loose republics' such as Taiwan, Hong Kong, Macao, Tibet, Inner Mongolia and Xinjiang: and 'close republics' consisting the rest of China."

According to Yan:

"They would differ from the existing federal countries in their defence, taxation and legal systems."

This model, however, in which the close republics would have an arrangement based on the United States of America, and the loose republics more on the European Union, is not agreed upon by all advocates of a Federal Republic.

On June 4, 2020, a proposed New Federal State of China was announced, led by an exiled billionaire, Guo Wengui (a.k.a. Miles Kwok), and Steve Bannon.

=== "United China" or "United States of China" ===
Another concept is that of a United China or a United States of China. First devised in the early 1920s by Chen Jiongming, it was modeled closely after the United States of America. Given the political, social and linguistic realities of China in the warlord period, Chen Jiongming believed that a federalist approach was the only feasible way to eventually establish a united, democratic republic. Beginning with Guangdong as a model state, he wanted to organize a "United States of China in the manner of the American experience" through negotiation with federalists from all parts of the country (New York Times June 27, 1922).

=== "United Republics of China" ===
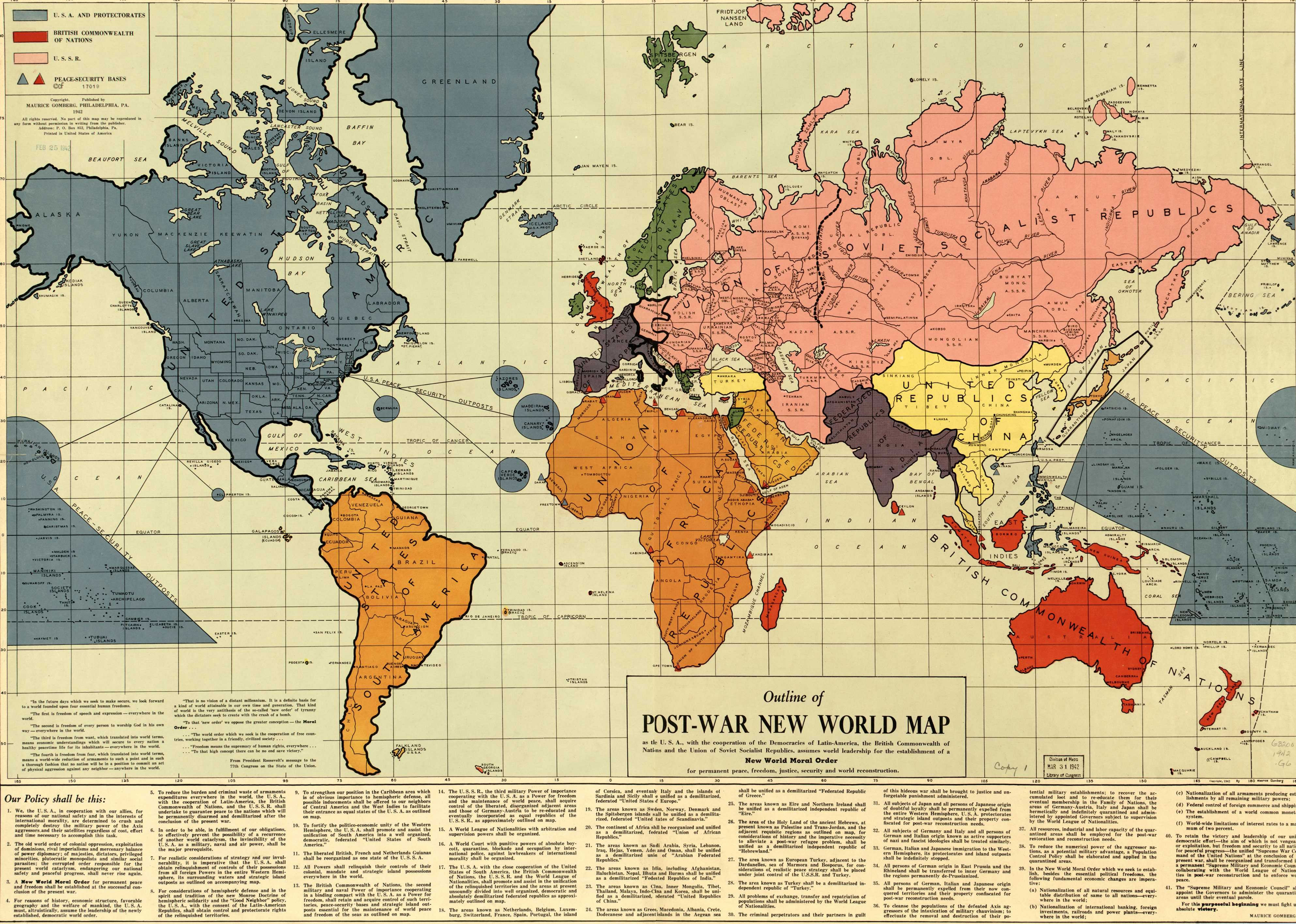
Gomberg's map

The concept of a United Republics of China first appeared in the "Outline of (the) Post-War New World Map" created by Maurice Gomberg and published in Philadelphia in early 1942. The map shows a proposal to re-arrange the world after an Allied victory against the Axis forces. In the map the United Republics of China (URC) includes most parts of present-day China, Korea, the erstwhile French colony of Indochina (now Vietnam, Laos and Cambodia), Thailand and Malaya. Otherwise, North Manchuria and Mongolia belong to the USSR; Taiwan and Hainan become territories of the United States.

== See also ==
- Chinese unification
- Cross-Strait relations
- Democracy in China
- Federalism
- Government of China
- Government of the Republic of China
- Heqin
- Liberalism in China
- Local ethnic nationalism
- One country, two systems
- Tiao-kuai
