= Zhang Yue (PRC politician) =

Chinese politician (born 1961)

- 张越

Secretary of the Political and Legal Affairs Commission of Hebei
- In office August 2008 – April 2016
- Preceded by: Wang Qijiang (王其江)
- Succeeded by: Dong Xiansheng

Personal details
- Born: June 1961 (age 65) Guangrao County, Shandong, China
- Party: Chinese Communist Party (expelled)
- Education: Central Party School of the Chinese Communist Party

Zhang Yue (Chinese: 张越; pinyin: Zhāng Yuè; born June 1961) is a former Chinese politician, and Secretary of the Political and Legal Affairs Commission of Hebei. A police officer by training, Zhang had a lengthy career rising through the ranks in China's policing system. He was dismissed from his position in April 2016 and undergoing investigation by the Central Commission for Discipline Inspection.

== Career ==
Zhang Yue was born in Guangrao County, Shandong and joined the Chinese Communist Party in 1984. He graduated from the Beijing Public Security College (北京市公安学校) and Central Party School of the Chinese Communist Party. Zhang began his career as a police officer in Beijing, and worked in the "illegal organizations" investigative unit of the Beijing police force. In 2001, Zhang became deputy director of Beijing Public Security Bureau, then became director of Anti-cult Bureau of the Ministry of Public Security in 2003.

In January 2008, Zhang was named director of the Hebei Public Security Department, and several months later also took on the office of the Secretary of the Political and Legal Affairs Commission of Hebei, and a member of the provincial party standing committee. As the Hebei Zhengfawei chief, Zhang's was tasked with ensuring security for the 2008 Beijing Olympics in what became known as the "palace moat" project. Due to Hebei's strategic geographic location surrounding the Chinese capital, Zhang collaborated with his former colleagues at the Beijing Public Security Bureau to construct an extensive network of defenses around Beijing.

Apart from the "palace moat" project, Zhang did not have other significant achievements during his time as the police chief of Hebei province. His subordinates said that he was short-tempered and liked yelling at people with a "thick Beijing accent." Several people working in Hebei's police system filed petitions against Zhang for alleged misconduct, to no avail. At the onset of the anti-corruption campaign under Xi Jinping, many in the province felt that Zhang Yue's time was near and his colleagues began distancing themselves from him. It was said that even his driver did not want to drive him around anymore. However, despite the fall of his former boss Zhou Benshun, the provincial party chief, and various others on Hebei's standing committee, Zhang remained still.

== Investigation ==
On April 16, 2016, Zhang was placed under investigation by the Central Commission for Discipline Inspection, the party's internal disciplinary body, for "serious violations of regulations". Zhang was the fourth member of the Hebei provincial standing committee to be investigated in the corruption campaign, after Liang Bin, Zhou Benshun and Jing Chunhua

Zhang was married to Meng Li, a television host on CCTV-2, the main financial and economics channel of China's state broadcaster. It was said that through Meng, Zhang fostered ties with then Minister of Public Security Zhou Yongkang, who put Zhang's career on the 'fast track'. Zhang also became involved with business mogul Guo Wengui, Hebei politician Jing Chunhua (who was from the same hometown as Zhang), and State Security vice-minister Ma Jian. Guo had relied upon Zhang to acquire a large share in Minzu Securities of China from a state-owned bank in Hebei at far-below market value; Zhang was also said to have given orders to arrest Guo's business rival Qu Long, who was arrested by "illegal possession of a weapon" and eventually sentenced by a court in Chengde (under Zhang's jurisdiction) to 15 years in prison for financial crimes. Zhang was also said to have meddled in individual cases.

On July 28, 2016, Zhang was expelled from the Communist Party for violating the Eight-point Regulation, taking bribes for advancing the interests of others, carrying out "superstitious activities", using public funds to "wine and dine", dereliction of duty while carrying out an "important task", obstructing the investigation into his wrongdoing, and trading sex for money and power. On April 20, 2017, Zhang was convicted on charges of taking bribes worth 157 million yuan (~$24 million); Zhang expressed remorse for his crimes. On July 12, 2018, Zhang was sentenced on 15 years in prison and fined five million yuan for taking bribes worth 156 million yuan (~$24 million) by the Intermediate People's Court in Changzhou. Although he took a huge amount of bribes and "caused severe damages to the interest of the state and people," Zhang turned himself in, fully confessed, provided leads on other important criminal cases, and returned the majority of the bribes, which constituted mitigation of sentence, according to the court.
