= Zhang Yue =

Zhang Yue may refer to:

- Zhang Yue (Tang dynasty) (張說, 663–730), Chinese official of the Tang dynasty
- Zhang Yue (PRC politician) (张越, born 1961), former Chinese politician, who served as Secretary of the Political and Legal Affairs Commission of Hebei
- Zhang Yue (张跃), Chinese businessman and chairman of Broad Group in Hunan, China
- Zhang Yue (host) (张越, born 1965), Chinese female TV host, who serves in China Central Television
- Zhang Yue (materials scientist) (born 1958), Chinese academic
- Zhang Yue (actor) (张月, born 1994), Chinese actor

== Sportspeople ==
- Zhang Yue (footballer, born 1990) (张越), Chinese female football goalkeeper
- Zhang Yue (figure skater) (张悦, born 1993), Chinese female pair skater
- Zhang Yue (footballer, born 1999) (张越), Chinese male football defender
