= Ma Jian =

Ma Jian may refer to:

- Muhammad Ma Jian (马坚, 1906–1978), Chinese Confucian scholar and Islamic jurist
- Ma Jian (writer) (马建, born 1953), Chinese writer
- Ma Jian (politician) (马建, born 1956), former Vice Minister of State Security of China
- Ma Jian (basketball) (马健, born 1969), Chinese basketball player and occasional actor
- Jian Ma (computational biologist) (马坚), American computational biologist
