= GTV Media Group =

Media company by Steve Bannon and Guo Wengui

GTV Media Group Inc.
- Founded: April 20, 2020; 6 years ago
- Headquarters: Buffalo, New York, United States
- Key people: Steve Bannon, director; Guo Wengui, advisor and fundraiser
- Total equity: US$300 million (2020)
- Website: gtv.org

GTV Media Group, Inc. is a media company formed in April 2020 by Steve Bannon and Guo Wengui. The company operates GTV, a Chinese media platform.

== Background ==
Prior to forming GTV, Steve Bannon served as an executive of Breitbart News and an advisor to the first administration of U.S. President Donald Trump. Guo Wengui, also known as Miles Kwok, is a Chinese billionaire fugitive. Guo paid Bannon $1 million for consulting services related to G News from August 2018 to August 2019.

== History ==
GTV Media Group, Inc. was founded in New York on April 20, 2020. In August, The Wall Street Journal reported that GTV Media was being investigated by the Federal Bureau of Investigation (FBI) and U.S. Securities and Exchange Commission (SEC) related to more than $300 million in private equity funding. Some investors had requested refunds after GTV Media failed to produce official documents validating their investments. Bank accounts of the company were frozen by Wells Fargo and Chase Bank, and a Bank of America account of GTV Media's parent company was closed.

The organization also attracted attention in August following the federal grand jury indictment of Bannon, Brian Kolfage, and several of their associates on charges of conspiracy to commit fraud and conspiracy to commit money laundering in connection with the We Build the Wall fundraising project. Guo responded that the charges were "fabricated" and claimed that they were part of a plan by the Chinese Communist Party to "take Mr. Bannon down".

Like other entities under Guo and Bannon, this organization has also participated in the spread of non verified information and conspiracy theories about Hunter Biden as well as misinformation related to the COVID-19 pandemic.

In September 2021, GTV settled with the U.S. Securities and Exchange Commission over allegations that it participated in the illegal sale of shares and digital securities called G-Coins or G-Dollars. In the settlement, the firms paid more than $539 million.

=== New Zealand operations ===
GTV formerly hosted Counterspin Media, a far right New Zealand platform promoting far right ideology and conspiracy theories including opposition to COVID-19 vaccines and restrictions. Counterspin's hosts including founder and far right activist Kelvyn Alp and former Green Party activist Hannah Spierer.

== See also ==
- Breitbart News
- Gettr
- Citizens of the American Republic
- Government Accountability Institute
- New Federal State of China
- New Tang Dynasty Television
