= Jing Chunhua =

Chinese politician

Jing Chunhua 景春华

Secretary-General of the Hebei Provincial Party Committee
- In office December 2008 – March 2015
- Party Secretary: Zhou Benshun
- Preceded by: Zhang Li (张力)
- Succeeded by: Fan Zhaobing (范照兵)

Communist Party Secretary of Hengshui
- In office July 2006 – October 2008
- Preceded by: Li Junqu (李俊渠)
- Succeeded by: Chen Gui

Personal details
- Born: February 1956 (age 70) Guangrao County, Shandong
- Party: Chinese Communist Party (1976–2015, expelled)
- Education: Hebei University; Tianjin University
- Occupation: Politician

Jing Chunhua (Chinese: 景春华; pinyin: Jǐng Chūnhuá; born February 1956) is a former Chinese politician who spent most of his career in Hebei province. Beginning in 2008, Jing served as the Secretary-General of the Hebei Provincial Communist Party Committee, in charge of coordination and implementation. Prior to that, Jing served as party chief of Hengshui, a prefecture-level city. He was investigated in March 2015 by the Communist Party's anti-graft agency, suspected of corruption.

== Biography ==
Si was born and raised in Guangrao, Shandong province in 1956. Jing joined the Communist Party in 1976. He began work in 1973 as a labourer in a mine and a team leader of the youth group. He entered the mine's management office in 1978. In 1983, he became deputy head, then head of the organization department of the mine, in charge of human resources. He also earned a diploma part-time at Hebei Broadcasting and Television College in Chinese language. In 1987 he began heading the Communist Youth League (CYL) organization in the city, a position he stayed on for the next five years. He was then made deputy CYL Secretary in Hebei province while studying economics at the Central Party School.

In 1995 he was again elevated to lead the CYL organization in the province, earning the rank equivalent to a provincial department director. He again took up part-time studies, this time studying global economics at Hebei University. In 1997 he was named deputy party chief of Chengde while maintaining his department director rank. He engaged in yet another study stint, this time in "scientific socialism."

In July 2001, he was named acting mayor of Chengde, and confirmed as mayor formally in March 2002. He served until 2006, during which time he attended Tianjin University to engage in further studies in "management science and engineering". He finally earned a full-fledged executive position as head of the party (the highest political office) in Hengshui in July 2006, at age 50.

In October 2008 he became Secretary-General of the Hebei Provincial Party Committee. The position is in charge of coordinating different individuals and organizations to implement party policy in the province. In January 2011 he entered the top ranks of the province by earning a seat on the provincial Party Standing Committee. After Xi Jinping became the General Secretary of the Chinese Communist Party in November 2012, a large campaign began emphasizing the "mass line". As part of this campaign, officials were expected to criticize themselves. Jing took part in democratic life meetings of the provincial party leadership. Jing said he "did not pay enough attention to detail," and did not "uphold democratic centralism" because he didn't speak too often during standing committee meetings. In September 2013, Jing attended a democratic life meeting presided over by Xi Jinping himself, during which Jing said he had become "too pretentious and too prideful" over the years and often forgot that he was still a civil servant.

In April 2014, Jing became the head of the provincial reform office, overseeing major reform initiatives, ostensibly a position of high responsibility, as "deepening reform" was high on the agenda of the Xi-Li Administration. On March 3, 2015, prior the opening of the annual "two sessions" conference in Beijing, state media announced Jing was undergoing investigation by the Central Commission for Discipline Inspection. Jing was the second official of provincial-level rank from Hebei province to fall from grace in Xi Jinping's anti-corruption drive, after provincial party organization chief Liang Bin, who was detained in 2014. However, Liang's case is believed to be related to his term in office in Shanxi province, where he served prior to coming to Hebei. Jing, on the other hand, spent his entire political career in Hebei. The announcement to investigate Jing also broke an unspoken rule that investigations of high-ranking officials would not be announced during the annual convening of the Chinese legislature in March.

On May 8, 2015, at the conclusion of the investigation by the CCDI, Jing was expelled from the Communist Party. The investigation concluded that Jing used his position of power to further the interests of others and promote associates in exchange for bribes, and that he committed "adultery." He was indicted on charges of bribery and transferred to judicial authorities for prosecution.

On December 23, 2016, Jing was sentenced to 18 years in prison.
