= Chen Gui (politician) =

Chinese politician

- 陈贵

Communist Party Secretary of Hengshui
- In office November 2008 – April 2010
- Preceded by: Jing Chunhua
- Succeeded by: Liu Kewei

Personal details
- Born: October 1956 (age 69) Zhuolu County, Hebei, China
- Party: Chinese Communist Party (1984–2016; expelled)
- Education: Hebei Normal University; Peking University; Central Party School of the Chinese Communist Party

Chen Gui (simplified Chinese: 陈贵; traditional Chinese: 陳貴; pinyin: Chén Guì; born October 1956) is a former Chinese politician who spent most of his career in North China's Hebei province. As of March 2015 he was under investigation by the Communist Party's anti-corruption agency. Previously he served as the Communist Party Secretary of Hengshui.

== Life and career ==
Chen was born and raised in Zhuolu County, Hebei. He graduated from Hebei Normal University in 1981, majoring in Chinese language.

He was appointed to the vice-county governor and deputy Communist Party secretary of Huaian County in February 1993, and Communist Party secretary, the top political position in the city, from February 1996 to December 1997.

Chen was vice-mayor of Zhangjiakou in December 1997, and deputy Communist Party secretary, in February 2003. In June 2006 he was transferred to Qinhuangdao as the deputy Communist Party secretary, a position he held until March 2008.

In November 2008 he was promoted to become the Communist Party Secretary of Hengshui. However, he was dismissed for "disciplinary violations" in April 2010, for reasons that were never made public. He then left public view.

== Downfall ==
Chen was placed under investigation by the authorities in March 2015, again for unknown reasons. He was the second Hebei official to be announced to be under investigation since an anti-corruption campaign began following the 18th Party Congress. It is notable that his predecessor as Hengshui party chief Jing Chunhua was also investigated for corruption.

In January 2016, he was expelled from the Chinese Communist Party (CCP) and dismissed from public office.

Party political offices
Preceded by Jing Chunhua	Communist Party Secretary of Hengshui; 2008–2010	Succeeded by Liu Kewei
