= New Federal State of China =

Political lobby group created by Guo Wengui and Steve Bannon

- Himalaya Supervisory Organization
- 新中国联邦
- Established: 4 June 2020; 6 years ago
- Founders: Guo Wengui; Steve Bannon
- Founded at: New York City
- Type: Political lobby group
- Purpose: Political activism against the Chinese Communist Party
- Leader: Guo Wengui
- Website: Rule of Law Foundation; Rule of Law Society; New Federal State of China

New Federal State of China
- Simplified Chinese: 新中国联邦
- Traditional Chinese: 新中國聯邦
Transcriptions
Standard Mandarin
- Hanyu Pinyin: Xīn Zhōngguó Liánbāng
- Wade–Giles: Hsin Chungkuo Lianpang

The New Federal State of China (NFSC; simplified Chinese: 新中国联邦; traditional Chinese: 新中國聯邦) is a political movement or lobby group created by Guo Wengui and Steve Bannon, with the stated aim of overthrowing the Chinese Communist Party (CCP) as the Chinese government. Launched on 4 June 2020, in New York City, the body has been referred to by its founders as a "government in exile" of China.

A related group, the Himalaya Supervisory Organization, an NGO, is dedicated to spreading the word and acting as the means of communications with "international communities". The group operates in Australia under the name Himalaya Australia, in New Zealand under Himalaya New Zealand and in the UK as Himalaya UK. It has been involved in protests against the Chinese government, has opposed the arrest of Bannon in the US, and presented misinformation and conspiracies theories on the COVID-19 virus.

According to Alethea, a disinformation analysis firm, social media accounts linked to NFSC and affiliated networks were part of coordinated activity that the firm assessed as consistent with attempts to interfere with U.S. elections, including spreading false or misleading content about voting, promoting right-wing U.S. political figures, and targeting users in swing states.

== Establishment and organization ==
The group evolved from a group of self-proclaimed whistleblowers known as Bàoliào Gémìng (Whistleblower Movement, Chinese: 爆料革命; lit. 'Whistleblower Revolution'), rebranded by Bannon and Guo as the New Federal State of China. The group's presence has been boosted by a US-based Chinese influencer on YouTube named Lude, who is, according to an ex-insider, "the number one propagandist for Guo Wengui".

The announcement of the establishment of the group was heralded by aircraft flying banners over US cities, including New York, and celebrated a ceremony attended by Guo and Bannon on board Guo's yacht in New York Harbor. At that gathering, Bannon restated his intention to help to overthrow the CCP.

Former Chinese football star Hao Haidong was involved in reading the "Declaration of New Federal State of China", as was his wife, the retired badminton star Ye Zhaoying. Another sponsor was American hedge fund manager Kyle Bass. Announcement of the state was designed to coincide with the 31st anniversary of the Tiananmen Square massacre on 4 June 1989, with the purpose of the state described as being to "overthrow the Chinese government". It has been described as a political group.

The "Declaration of The New Federal State of China", posted on Guo's G News website on 3 June:

At the time of the announcement of the establishment of the New Federal State of China, the Himalaya Supervisory Organization hereby solemnly pledges:... the Himalaya Supervisory Organization will make all preparations for the formation of the New Federal State of China with outreach efforts. It will actively liaise with various countries, political parties, associations and international friends supporting the establishment of the New Federal State of China and coordinate relationships with the interim government... The Himalaya Supervisory Organization will collaborate with international supervisory organizations to oversee the operations of the New Federal State of China according to law. The Himalaya Supervisory Organization complies with both international law and laws made by the New Federal State of China and accepts strict supervision from relevant international legal institutions.

Guo claims to have invested $100 million in the movement. Funding for the movement, as well as its sources, are under investigation by the FBI.

Bannon has described his role as an "adviser" to the group.

== Responses and analysis ==
PRC foreign ministry spokesman Geng Shuang stated in response to questions for comment on the declaration "To these absurd statements, to this farce, I don't have any interest in commenting".

The director of the Asia Pacific section at the fact check organisation First Draft News, Anne Kruger, said that the group's followers post "questionable material" prolifically on the internet, and that "Their main tactic is really to try to appeal to people that might have a gripe against the Chinese Communist Party and to push conspiracy theories".

The East Turkistan Government in Exile led East Turkestan/Uyghur, Tibetan, and Manchurian organizations in condemning the 'New Federal State of China', criticizing the founders for unilaterally including East Turkestan (Xinjiang), Manchuria, and Tibet in their proposed new Chinese state and accused them of promoting Chinese imperialism. The ETGE stated that the people of East Turkistan "do not wish to be a part of China nor a "federation" that keeps East Turkistan, Manchuria, South Mongolia, and Tibet under China's rule and influence."

The Tibetan Government-in-Exile expressed disapproval of the group, criticizing the founders for unilaterally including Tibet in their proposed new Chinese state without consultation with Tibetan exiles, and for using disrespectful terms when referring to the Dalai Lama and other Tibetans in exile.

== Presence in other countries and online ==
The Himalaya Supervisory Organization was created to "serve as a bridge of communications between the New Federal State of China and international communities in areas of cooperation, defending people's freedom, and protecting the security of assets on the basis of common development and mutual respect among the people of the whole world". The group has established branches in several countries apart from the US, including Canada, Taiwan, Japan, New Zealand and Australia.

ABC News reported that Himalaya Australia disseminated pamphlets and online material in Australia, promoting unverified theories about the origins of COVID-19, which researchers and fact-checkers had described as part of a broader pattern of misinformation and political campaigning targeting the Chinese government. Some of the claims had included the promotion of Li-Meng Yan, a former University of Hong Kong postdoctoral researcher, who made claims on American cable television that COVID-19 was artificially made in a laboratory. In Australia, a Facebook page post dated 10 June 2020 from the Himalaya Australia page stated that "the CCP is a gangster organization" and encouraged readers to "spread truth of global news to free the Chinese people and free the people around the globe", linking COVID-19 to the Chinese Communist Party.

Himalaya New Zealand's website states its objectives as "to raise awareness of truth disclosed by the Whistle-blower movement initiated by Mr Miles Guo and the former White House strategist Mr. Steve K. Bannon" and "to counter false narratives forced through left-leaning mainstream media and compromised key NGOs within New Zealand".

A YouTube channel, Himalaya UK, is part of the "Guo Library". The first video published under their name appears to be on 7 August 2020. As of 2 November 2020 it has 1,200 subscribers, but views per video rarely hit 100.

It is said that 26 "farms" have been established by New Federal State of China across 12 different countries in the world. They claim these organizations provide "consultation, mutual aid, financial, and investment service", and to provide shelter and support when the CCP is toppled. They are organized through internet messaging apps including Discord and WhatsApp. The collection of all the "farms" is called the "Himalaya Alliance". Critics claim these farms have dedicated social media channels that require donations to access and gather people to join both online promotion as well as physical activities and protests.

== Activities ==
In late July 2020, during the forced closing of the Chinese Consulate in Houston by the United States government, protesters critical of the People's Republic of China gathered outside the consulate with flags of the New Federal State of China.

In August 2020, supporters of the organisation protested the arrest of Bannon.

During the COVID-19 pandemic, the group has been promoting hydroxychloroquine as an effective treatment for the disease. It has spread the leaflets across Australia by letter-box drop. The group has also been accused of spreading disinformation in Canada about COVID-19, and holding protests accusing people associated with Chinese dissident groups of being "spies". The group has also participated in anti-vaccine campaigns and promotion of more recent therapies such as ivermectin.

The group has been heavily involved in the spread of awareness about deals US president-elect Joe Biden's son, Hunter Biden, had been involved in, in both China and Ukraine. They have also claimed to have video evidence of sexual abuse in which he was involved, and posted videos online which have been viewed tens of millions of times, but neither the source nor the representations in the videos could be verified as genuine. YouTube influencer Lude was the first to mention the videos in late September 2020, posted to his channel with 200,000 subscribers, and the stories have subsequently been reported extensively on Guo's media outlets, GTV Media Group and G News.

In January 2025, Pakistan's interior minister Mohsin Naqvi attended the group's events during his visit to Washington, DC, and although he claimed that he did not participate in any anti-China activities, it still sparked criticism from Pakistani politicians and was seen by analysts as a rift in China-Pakistan relations.

=== Internal conflict ===
John Pan, a Chinese migrant to Australia active in human rights advocacy, was drawn into the inner circle of 18 members, which included Chinese dissidents and social media influencers, and worked with Guo for a few months in 2019. After becoming disillusioned and leaving the group in late 2019, Guo branded him a "CCP spy", and in October 2020 a group of people carrying banners bearing NFSC and Himalaya Australia logos and the words "Kick the CCP's agent out of Australia!" stood outside his house chanting those words. Pan and Texan pastor Bob Fu are suing Guo for defamation.

== See also ==
- Federal Republic of China
- United States of China
- GTV Media Group
