= Su Deliang =

Chinese politician

- 苏德良

Leader of the Group of the Central Commission for Discipline Inspection and the National Supervisory Commission in the Supreme People's Procuratorate
- Incumbent
- Assumed office May 2018
- Preceded by: Wang Xingning

Vice-Minister of State Security
- In office August 2015 – May 2018
- Minister: Geng Huichang
- Preceded by: Ma Jian

Director of the Political Department of the Ministry of State Security
- In office August 2013 – June 2018
- Preceded by: Liu Li
- Succeeded by: Li Wenzhang

Secretary of the Political and Legal Committee of Ningxia
- In office December 2006 – May 2013
- Preceded by: Li Shuntao
- Succeeded by: Wang Yanfei

Personal details
- Born: January 1960 (age 66) Shengzhou, Zhejiang, China
- Party: Chinese Communist Party
- Education: Central Party School of the Chinese Communist Party

Chinese name
- Traditional Chinese: 蘇德良
- Simplified Chinese: 苏德良
Transcriptions
Standard Mandarin
- Hanyu Pinyin: Sū Déliáng

Su Deliang (born January 1960) is a Chinese politician and the current Leader of the Group of the Central Commission for Discipline Inspection and the State Supervision Commission in the Supreme People's Procuratorate. Previously he served as Vice-Minister of State Security, Secretary of the Political and Legal Committee of Ningxia Autonomous Region, Head of Ningxia Public Security Bureau, President of Ningxia Jurisprudence Society, and a member of the CPC Ningxia Provincial Standing Committee.

== Life and career ==
Born in Shengzhou, Zhejiang in January 1960, Su Deliang graduated from Central Party School of the Chinese Communist Party.

Su began his political career in September 1980, and joined the Chinese Communist Party in March 1985.

Beginning in 1984, he served in several posts in Shanghai Municipal State Security Agency, including deputy sector chief, deputy director, and assistant director.

In August 1999, he was transferred to southwest China's Hainan and appointed deputy head of Hainan Provincial State Security Agency, and a member of the party committee, he served there until August 2002.

In August 2002, he was transferred again to northwest China's Ningxia Autonomous Region, where he became its deputy secretary-general, party boss and head of its Provincial State Security Agency, and was re-elected in March 2005. He also served as Secretary of the Political and Legal Committee from December 2006 to May 2013, and he was a member of its CPC Standing Committee between June 2007 to May 2013.

In May 2013, Su Deliang was promoted to become a member of the Ministry of State Security of the Chinese Communist Party, and concurrently served as its director of the Political Department. In August 2015, he was promoted again to become Vice-Minister of State Security, replacing Ma Jian, who was stripped of his post for alleged "serious violations of discipline and laws" during the Chinese government's ongoing anti-corruption campaign.

In May 2018, he became leader of the Group of the Central Commission for Discipline Inspection and the National Supervisory Commission in the Supreme People's Procuratorate, replacing Wang Xingning.

Government offices
Preceded by Li Shuntao	Head of Ningxia Public Security Department; 2005–2013	Succeeded by Wang Yanfei
Preceded by Liu Li	Director of the Political Department of the Ministry of State Security; 2013–2018	Succeeded by Li Wenzhang
Party political offices
Preceded by Li Shuntao	Secretary of the Political and Legal Committee of Ningxia; 2006–2013	Succeeded by Wang Yanfei
Preceded by Wang Xingning	Leader of the Group of the Central Commission for Discipline Inspection and the National Supervisory Commission in the Supreme People's Procuratorate; 2018–	Incumbent
