= Guo Wengui =

Chinese businessman and political activist

- 郭文贵
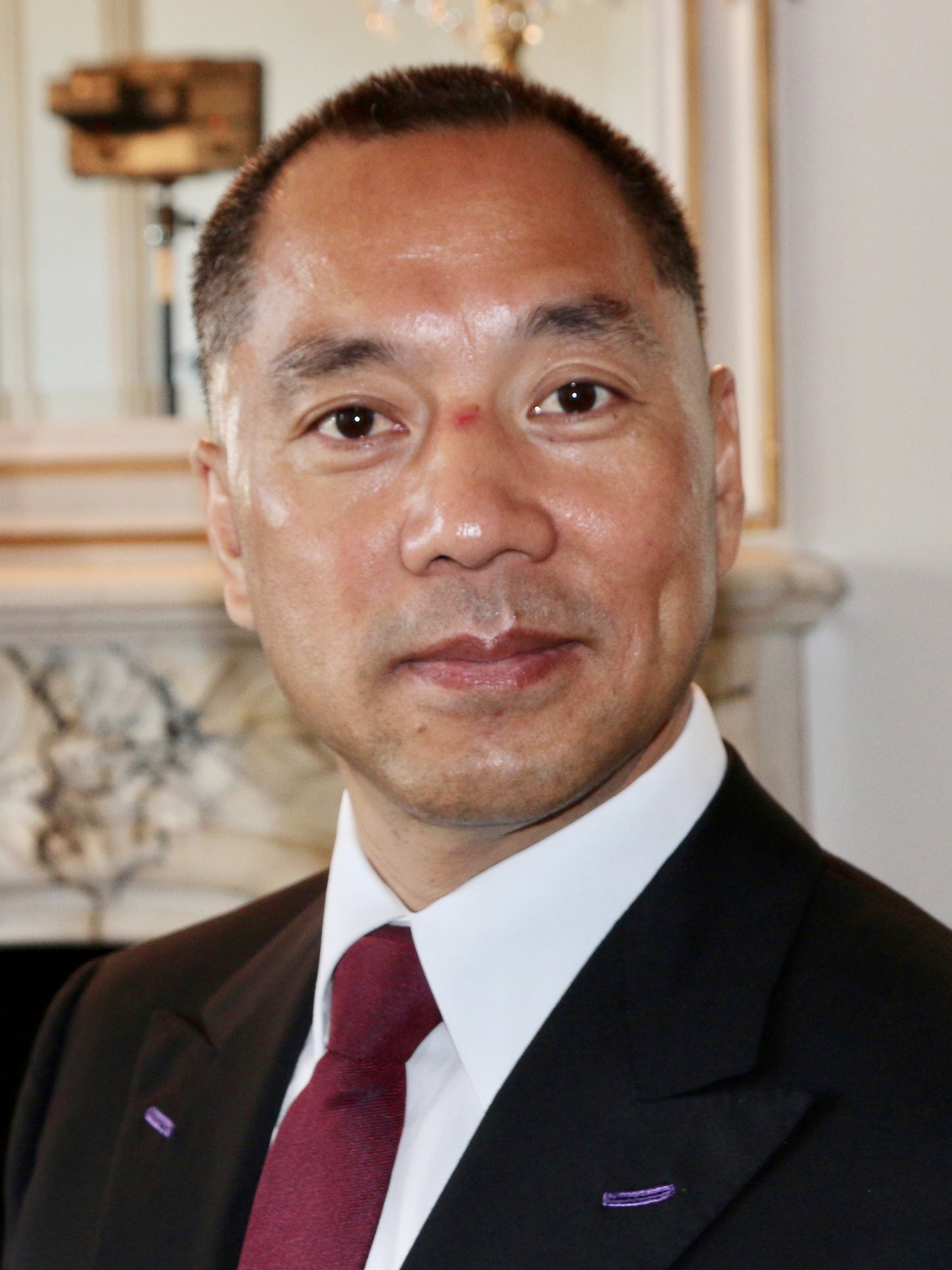
- Guo Wengui in 2017
- Born: May 10, 1970 (age 56) or October 5, 1968 (age 57); Shen County, Liaocheng, Shandong, China
- Occupations: Businessman, political activist
- Organization(s): New Federal State of China (Founder); Rule of Law Foundation
- Spouse: Yue Qingzhi (m. 1985)
- Children: 2

Chinese name
- Traditional Chinese: 郭文貴
- Simplified Chinese: 郭文贵
Transcriptions
Standard Mandarin
- Hanyu Pinyin: Guō Wénguì
- Wade–Giles: Kuo Wen-kuei
- IPA: [kwó wə̌n.kwêi]
Yue: Cantonese
- Jyutping: Gwok3 man4-gwai3
- IPA: [kʷɔ̄ːk̚ mɐ̏n.kʷɐ̄i]
Southern Min
- Hokkien POJ: Koeh Bûn-kùi

English name
- English: Miles Kwok

Guo Wengui (simplified Chinese: 郭文贵; traditional Chinese: 郭文貴; born May 10, 1970—self claim or October 5, 1968), also known as Ho Wan Kwok (郭浩云; 郭浩雲), Miles Guo, and Miles Kwok, is an exiled Chinese businessman. In 2014, Guo ranked 74th on the Hurun China Rich List with estimated assets of US$2.6 billion. Later that year, he left China for the United States amid an anti-corruption crackdown that targeted his associates, including top intelligence official Ma Jian. In the U.S., Guo developed a public profile as a self-described dissident and whistleblower against the Chinese Communist Party. Between 2018 and 2020, Guo and Steve Bannon launched media ventures including G News and GTV Media Group, which were criticized for spreading misinformation.

In 2021, Guo reached a settlement with the U.S. Securities and Exchange Commission involving US$539 million in refunds and penalties over illegal fundraising. In March 2023, Guo was arrested by the Federal Bureau of Investigation on charges of defrauding investors and supporters. In July 2024, a jury in the U.S. District Court for the Southern District of New York found him guilty on fraud and money-laundering-related charges. On June 29, 2026, he was sentenced to 30 years in prison.

== Biography ==
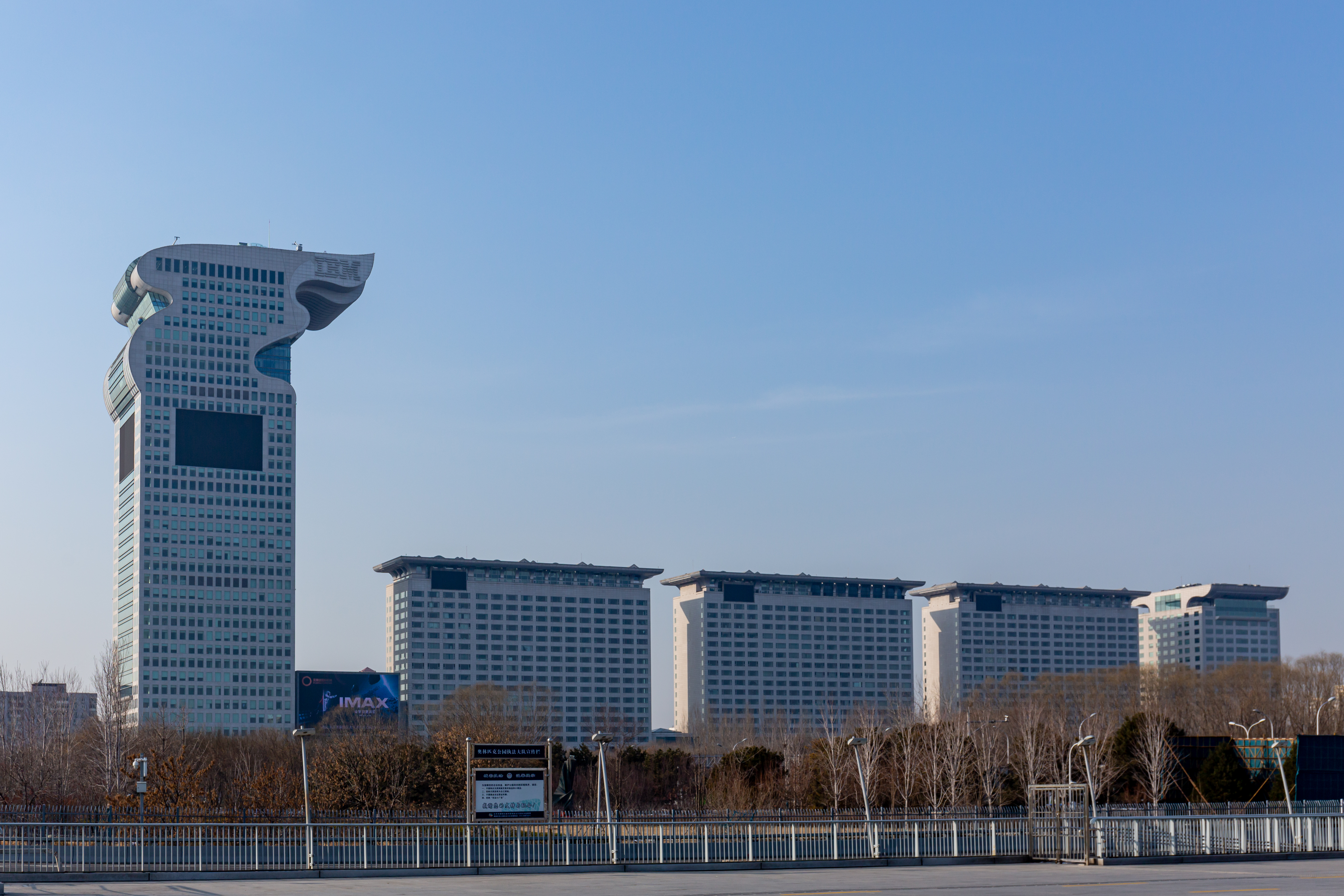
Pangu Plaza

Guo was born in Shen County, Shandong, China. He is the seventh of eight children. He began his business career in Zhengzhou, before moving to Beijing to secure various construction deals during the 2008 Beijing Olympics. In 2006, he delivered a Beijing deputy mayor's sex tape to the police. The deputy mayor, who had contested one of Guo's land deals, was subsequently imprisoned, allowing Guo to build the Pangu Plaza.

In 2014, Guo departed China after one of his political connections faced arrest. He moved to the United States in 2015. Guo, long prominent in real estate development and investment circles, came to fame in 2015 after a lengthy investigative report by Caixin media, controlled by Hu Shuli, was released, detailing Guo's political connections, business dealings, and hardball tactics against former rivals.

Guo responded by claiming Hu defamed him and responded with a set of personal accusations against Hu, claiming Hu had a romantic entanglement with his business rival. He opened a Twitter account in early 2017, frequently criticizing individuals within the Chinese establishment. He has reserved particular scorn for He Jintao, the son of former Central Commission for Discipline Inspection secretary He Guoqiang.

Many officials with whom he was said to have ties have fallen under the dragnet of the anti-corruption campaign under Xi Jinping, including Ma Jian, the former deputy director of Chinese Ministry of State Security (MSS), and Zhang Yue, the former Political and Legal Affairs Secretary of Hebei. While generally supportive of General Secretary Xi Jinping, Guo has characterized parts of the corruption campaign as a political witch hunt.

From the beginning of 2017, Guo is in self-imposed exile in New York City, where he owns an apartment on the Upper East Side of Manhattan, overlooking Central Park. He has continued to promote a political agenda bringing attention to corruption in the Chinese political system from his New York home. In November 2018, Guo put his 15 room apartment up for sale for US$67 million, despite having paid US$67.5 million in cash for it in 2015; previous attempts to sell for US$86 million in October 2015 and US$78 million in 2016 yielded no buyers.

Guo is a member of U.S. President Donald Trump's Mar-a-Lago resort in Florida and Mark's Club in Mayfair, London.

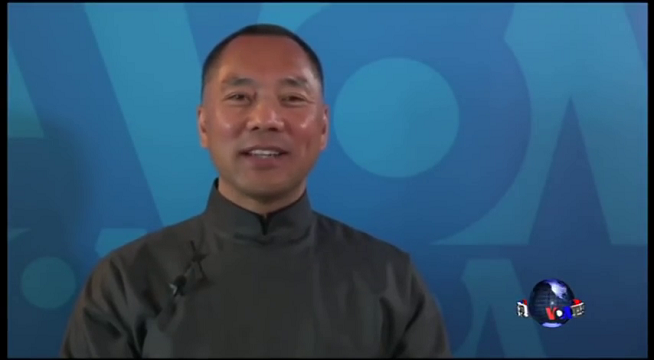
Guo Wengui on Voice of America, 2017

Since January 23, 2017, Guo accepted multiple interviews with media such as Mingjing, Voice of America (VOA) and BBC. Guo also started a campaign of accusing Chinese officials of corruption through live monologues on his YouTube and Twitter channel. On April 20, Guo's 3-hour live interview with VOA was abruptly terminated by the latter. Newspapers such as The New York Times, Financial Times, and Forbes also reported about Guo and his campaign. One of Guo's targets, HNA Group, sued Guo for defamation in June 2017.

In August 2018, several Hong Kong media, such as Ming Pao and South China Morning Post reported that Hong Kong Police had frozen the assets of the Guo family, accused of money laundering under the name of Guo's daughter Guo Mei. In March 2019, his mother died in China.

The book War for Eternity by Benjamin R. Teitelbaum details Guo's collaboration with Steve Bannon and the latter's attempt to undermine the Chinese government. On June 3, 2020 (the 31st anniversary of the Tiananmen Square massacre), while aboard Guo's yacht in New York City waterways, he and Steve Bannon participated in an event declaring a "New Federal State of China", a political movement that "would overthrow the Chinese government". In New York City, planes were seen carrying banners which said "Congratulations to Federal State of New China!". In August 2020, Bannon was arrested by federal authorities during an early morning raid on Guo's $35 million luxury yacht, docked in Connecticut, under charges of stealing millions of dollars from the We Build the Wall non-profit organization.

In February 2022 Guo filed for chapter 11 bankruptcy. In a filing for the bankruptcy, Guo estimated that his total assets are currently worth between $50,001 and $100,000, while his liabilities range between $100 million and $500 million.

== Beijing Zenith Holdings ==
Beijing Zenith Holdings (Chinese: 北京政泉控股) was a company owned in 2013 by Li Lin and Jiang Yuehua via two corporate entities (Chinese: 郑州浩云实业有限公司 and 郑州浩天实业有限公司). The company acquired a minority stake in PKU Healthcare from state-owned Founder Group's PKU Healthcare Group. However, Beijing Zenith Holdings allegedly failed to pay PKU Healthcare Group after the shares were already transferred. To finalize the payment, Beijing Zenith Holdings allegedly borrowed the money from PKU Resources Group Holdings, a sister company of PKU Healthcare Group. All three companies were fined by the China Securities Regulatory Commission in 2016.

In 2015, Chinese media reported that Zenith Holdings was actually owned by Guo Wengui, and Li Lin and Jiang Yuehua were his proxies.

Zenith Holdings also acquired a minority stake in Founder Securities by underwriting the new shares.

In October 2018, Zenith Holdings was fined CNY 60 billion for irregularity in acquiring the securities company. In its ruling, the court in Dalian found that Beijing Zenith had made RMB 11.9 billion in illegal profits.

== Chinese documents ==
On October 5, 2017, Guo made public in Washington a so-called "confidential document of the Chinese government" with the self-proclaimed verification of the U.S. government, featuring China's "working plan of secretly dispatching 27 police officers" to the United States on field duty in 2017.

== Criminal charges in China ==
In April 2017, an Interpol notice was issued for Guo's arrest, requested by the Chinese government. In June 2017, staff of one of Guo's other investment vehicles, Pangu Investment, were charged for scamming banks on loans. The staff members accused all alleged that they were under the orders of Guo.

By June 2017, the Chinese government sent U.S. President Donald Trump a letter, delivered by casino businessman Steve Wynn, requesting for Guo to be deported to China. Unnamed sources "familiar with [a] meeting" allege that Trump was inclined to deport Guo, a member of his Mar-a-Lago resort, but that his advisors opposed deporting him by reasoning that he could be used for political leverage against China.

== Twitter campaign against Guo ==
A study by the Australian Strategic Policy Institute which analysed the tweets of Chinese government controlled accounts banned by Twitter in response to the 2019–20 Hong Kong protests found that the accounts had distributed more material attacking Guo Wengui than any other target including the Hong Kong protestors. Other dissidents targeted by the bot network included Gui Minhai and Yu Wensheng as well as PLA veterans. In another report from the South China Morning Post, the researchers found that more than 38,000 tweets from 618 of the now-suspended Twitter accounts targeted Guo.

== Civil lawsuits ==
Several companies sued Guo's Pangu Investment and Zenith Holdings in the civil court of the United States, in order to reclaim the non-performing loan the companies allegedly lent to Guo.

In April 2017, Pacific Alliance Asia Opportunity Fund brought suit against Guo in the Commercial Division of New York County, where Guo resided and was seeking asylum from the United States government. In 2008, Pacific Alliance loaned $30 million to Guo's Hong Kong company in connection with the development of Pangu Plaza, site of a "7 Star Hotel" in Beijing near the Olympic arenas. In connection with the loan, Guo signed a personal guarantee. All of the documents and transactions were executed in Hong Kong or China. According to Pacific Alliance, Guo owes approximately $88 million in principal and accrued interest on the loan. In 2020, an apartment worth $55 million that an investment fund bought for Guo's use was seized in a bankruptcy proceeding in connection with the lawsuit.

In July 2017, Chinese actress Fan Bingbing sued Guo for defamation after he alleged that she had slept with CCP leader Wang Qishan.

On July 5, 2017, a police agency in central China opened a rape investigation against Guo, after a 28-year-old woman accused Guo of verbal, physical and sexual abuse, saying he had repeatedly raped her during trips to London, New York, and the Bahamas between 2015 and 2017, while she worked as his personal assistant. She alleged that Guo had kept her in "virtual detention" by taking away her passport, restricting and monitoring her internet usage as well as access to electronic devices, repeatedly threatening her, and confining her to an apartment in London's Belgravia district, also stating that Guo coerced other female employees into having sex with him. The woman provided testimony to a lawyer, presenting underwear, pregnancy tests, and abortion pills as proof, before asking for further assistance at the Embassy of China, London. The Associated Press reported on the development in August 2017, also confirming that the Chinese government sought a second Interpol notice for the case. Guo and his legal team initially declined to comment until the woman filed a civil lawsuit at the New York Supreme Court in September of the same year, seeking US$140,000,000 in compensation. Guo subsequently called the allegations "fake" and described them as part of a smear campaign against him by the Chinese Communist Party. As of 2020, China still sought custody of Guo for rape charges. The plaintiff in the rape case repeated her allegations in a deposition on June 3, 2021, with the case still pending as of 2024. Also in 2024, public affairs consultant Sam Nunberg stated that Guo's close associate Steve Bannon threatened him with legal action after he refused to defend Guo by claiming to have evidence that the rape allegation was fabricated by Bruno Wu, Steve Wynn and Elliott Broidy, a narrative which Nunberg described as "totally false" and instead based on animosity towards Wu as a business rival and Wynn and Broidy for supporting Guo's extradition to China in 2017. Guo had filed a defamation suit against Nunberg shortly after his refusal, which was dismissed in 2018.

In August 2017, the Chinese conglomerate HNA Group filed a defamation lawsuit in New York against Guo, said Guo made "repeatedly false and defamatory statements", including a claim that Yao Qing, a nephew of Wang Qishan, former Secretary of the Central Commission for Discipline Inspection and close supporter of General Secretary of the Chinese Communist Party Xi Jinping, is one of HNA's shareholders. HNA said the comments caused the company to lose business and suffer a drop in share prices, but Guo said he welcomes a legal spat with the giant Chinese conglomerate in the United States. In March 2019, however, HNA claimed that Guo's statements had no longer caught public attention and planned to drop this suit. Almost at the same time, Guo posted tweets on his own social media "Guo Media" declaring that he refused to withdraw from the HNA case and would continue.

On November 20, 2018, Guo held a conference with his close friend Steve Bannon in New York about the death of Wang Jian in France, who was the former chairman of HNA Group. During the conference, he announced the establishment of "Rule of Law foundation" for investigations about Chinese government financial activities as well as those of its supporters and offering financial support for businessmen, officials and others who are persecuted by Chinese Communist Party (CCP) and forced to flee overseas like Guo himself. This foundation consists of two parts which are different types of nonprofit organization. One part called "Rule of Law Foundation" is type 501(c)(3) while the other part called "Rule of Law Society" is type 501(c)(4). Kyle Bass serves as the chairman of part 501(c)(3) and Steve Bannon serves as the chairman of part 501(c)(4).

In December 2018, Roger Stone agreed to a settlement with Guo in which Stone would retract a false claim, published c. 2015-2016, that Guo had donated to Hillary Clinton.

On July 23, 2019, Strategic Vision US LLC, a US commercial research firm which has a commercial dispute with Guo, sued Guo in the US federal court, said Guo was a spy for the CCP. However, this lawsuit was dismissed, and after that Guo filed a US$50 million defamation lawsuit in New York state against several companies and individuals including Strategic Vision US and CNN host Erin Burnett, who called him a spy during the Outfront television program.

In August 2019, it was revealed that the Hong Kong Police Force froze bank accounts of Guo and other family members in 2017, in court documents requesting funds be released filed by Anton Development Limited, a company held by Guo's daughter Guo Mei. The freezing is part of a judicial review against the freezing of various assets linked to Guo and in relation to a HK$32.9 billion (S$5.8 billion) money laundering investigation, where court filings focus on Guo and other family members using their personal bank accounts and the bank accounts of Anton Development Limited and Hong Kong International Funds Investments Limited; the frozen accounts are said to total at least HK$1.56 billion. A writ provided by Anton Development Limited to police reportedly stated that HK$730 million in the frozen accounts were investment funds from a sovereign fund in Abu Dhabi.

== G News and GTV ==
G News is a website owned by Guo Media – a company associated with Guo – operating in collaboration with Steve Bannon, a former executive chairman of Breitbart News and former advisor to the Trump administration. Guo Media paid Bannon $1 million in exchange for consulting services from August 2018 to August 2019, and Bannon has an office in Guo Media's headquarters. Both Guo and Bannon are regularly featured in G News videos that criticize the Chinese government.

Guo and Bannon later co-founded GTV Media Group in 2020, which operates the Chinese video website GTV. The Wall Street Journal later reported that GTV companies were being investigated by federal and state authorities for illegal fundraising. In 2021 the companies reached an SEC settlement to repay over $480 million to more than 5,000 investors as well as $35 million in fines.

=== Misinformation by GTV and G News ===
Guo's media were noted for spreading misinformation during the COVID-19 pandemic. On January 25, 2020, G News claimed that the Chinese government was going to admit that the coronavirus disease 2019 (COVID-19) was accidentally leaked from a "P4 lab in Wuhan" that was associated with "covert biological weapon programs". Fact checker PolitiFact found no evidence to corroborate G News's claim, and determined it to be false, classifying it as COVID-19 misinformation.

In 2020, the New York Times reported that Guo and Steve Bannon had been promoting Chinese virologist Li-Meng Yan. They bought Yan a plane ticket to the United States, provided her accommodation, coached her in media appearances and helped secure interviews with conservative TV hosts including Tucker Carlson. Yan later made unsubstantiated pandemic claims that the COVID-19 virus had been artificially created, however her research was rejected as misinformation by scientists who called her paper as unscientific and "a polemic dressed up in jargon".

According to Foreign Policy, G News pushed false stories and conspiracy theories before and during the 2020 United States presidential election, including disseminating disinformation about Hunter Biden. Guo also had a large following on Twitter that shared the unverified stories immediately after publication. As of December 2020, Guo's Twitter account, which had over half a million followers, has been suspended.

In July 2021, BBC News reported on the collaboration between Steve Bannon and Guo Wengui in disseminating misinformation about election fraud and COVID-19 vaccines, as well as QAnon narratives on social media platforms.

In July 2024, the Ministry of Home Affairs of Singapore, under the Foreign Interference (Countermeasures) Act 2021, directed social media platforms X, Facebook, Instagram, YouTube and TikTok to block nearly 100 social media accounts affiliated to Guo. The ministry stated these accounts are not operated by Singaporeans, and forms Guo's hostile information campaign against Singapore. Lianhe Zaobao states the accounts shared Guo's videos claiming that Prime Minister Lawrence Wong is manipulated by the Chinese Communist Party and that Singapore is doomed like Hong Kong.

== Other controversies ==
In 2017 Guo Wengui accused Taiwanese actress Lin Chi-ling of having an affair with Chinese businessman Xiao Jianhua. Lin dismissed the rumors as "outrageous, fake, and excessively stupid".

In December 2020 Teng Biao said Guo had arranged picketing of the homes of Teng and other dissidents, accusing them of conspiring with the Chinese government. This led to conflicting theories about what Guo was trying to achieve.

== Criminal convictions in the United States ==
Guo was arrested on March 15, 2023, in New York by FBI for conspiracy to defraud his online followers out of more than $1 billion. He faced 12 criminal charges, including securities and wire fraud, racketeering, and money laundering. These included $452 million in unregistered offering and $150 million in loans for GTV, in addition to $250 million for membership programmes and $262 million for the Himalaya Exchange cryptocurrency project. Prosecutors stated that funds raised from investors and supporters were used to finance Guo's "lavish lifestyle", including a 50,000 square foot mansion, a $1 million Lamborghini and a $37 million yacht. Guo denied the allegations, stating that the funds were used for his political activism.

On July 16, 2024, after a trial which lasted seven weeks, a jury in the Southern District of New York found Guo guilty on nine of 12 charges, including securities and wire fraud, racketeering, and money laundering. On June 29, 2026, he was sentenced to 30 years in prison by Judge Analisa Torres, who stated that Guo had “preyed on people seeking to bring democracy to China,” causing them “substantial financial and emotional harm.”

== See also ==
- Hao Haidong
- Gettr
- Wang Liqiang
