= Zhang Yue (materials scientist) =

Chinese materials scientist (born 1958)

- 张跃
- Born: November 1958 (age 67); Changsha, Hunan, China
- Education: Wuhan University; University of Science and Technology Beijing
- Scientific career
- Fields: Inorganic nonmetallic materials
- Workplaces: University of Science and Technology Beijing

Chinese name
- Traditional Chinese: 張躍
- Simplified Chinese: 张跃
Transcriptions
Standard Mandarin
- Hanyu Pinyin: Zhāng Yuè

Zhang Yue (Chinese: 张跃; born November 1958) is a Chinese materials scientist currently serving as a professor and vice-president of the University of Science and Technology Beijing.

== Education ==
Zhang was born in Changsha, Hunan in November 1958, while his ancestral home in Liling, Zhuzhou. After the resumption of college entrance examination, he entered Wuhan University of Water Resources and Electric Power (now Wuhan University), where he earned his Bachelor of Science degree in February 1982. In September 1987, he was accepted to the University of Science and Technology Beijing, where he received his doctor of engineering degree in October 1993. He carried out postdoctoral research at Wuhan University of Technology (now Wuhan University of Technology) from October 1993 to October 1995.

== Career ==
In February 1982, he became an assistant at Wuhan University of Science and Technology, he served for a total of five years. He joined the faculty of the University of Science and Technology Beijing in October 1995, what he was promoted to professor in 1995 and to doctoral supervisor in 1998. In 2000 Anthony Mason Fellowship financed his research at the School of Materials Science and Engineering, University of New South Wales. From January 2001 to February 2002, the Japan Society for the Promotion of Science (JSPS) found funds for his research at Tohoku University, Tokyo University, Tokyo University of Technology, Osaka University, and Kyoto University. He was a visiting professor at Georgia Institute of Technology between October 2002 and April 2003.

He is now a professor and vice-president of the University of Science and Technology Beijing.

== Honours and awards ==
- November 22, 2019 Member of the Chinese Academy of Sciences (CAS)
