= Outline of the Post-War New World Map =

1942 map by Maurice Gomberg

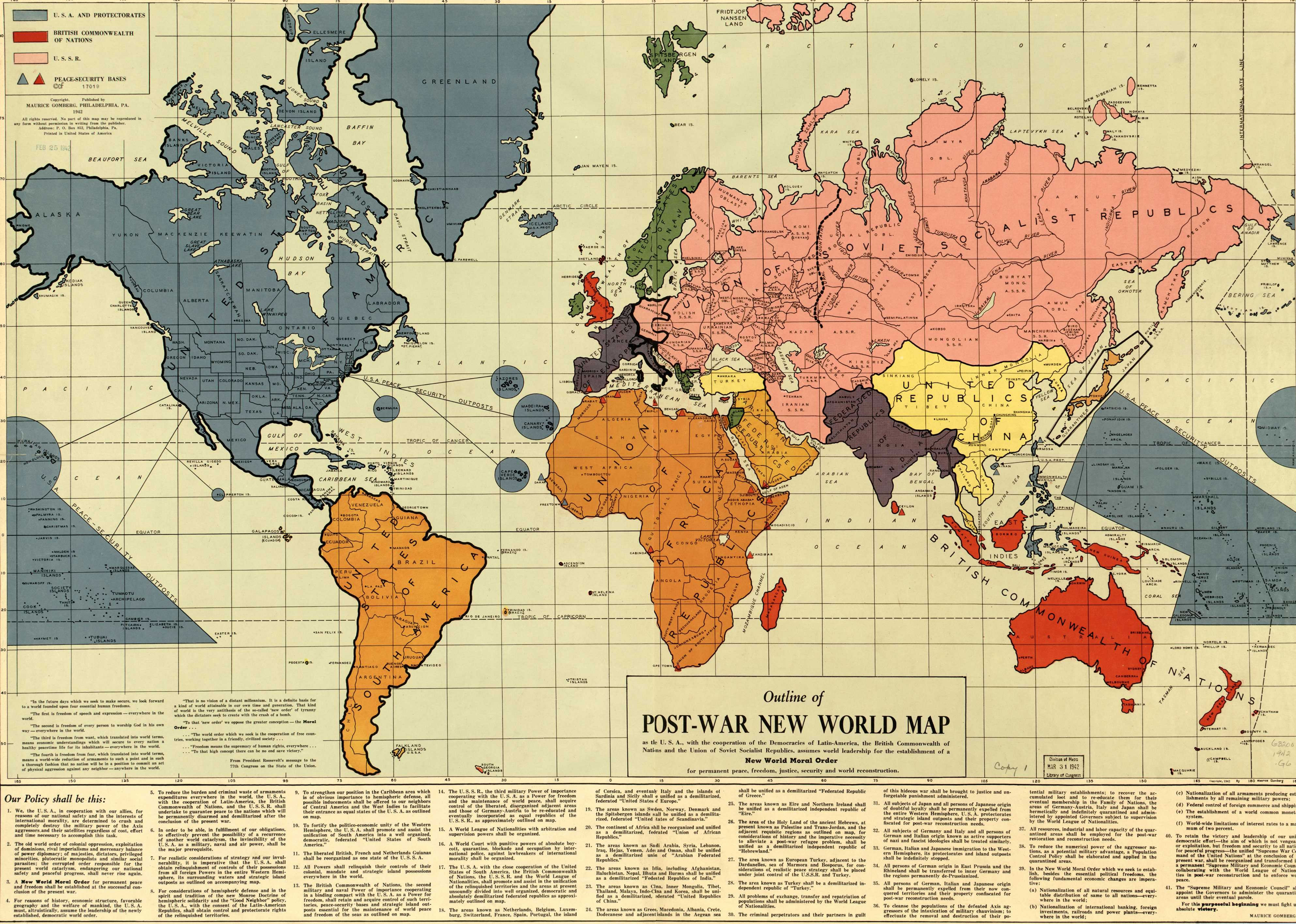
Outline of the Post-War New World Map. Published 1942, Philadelphia, PA

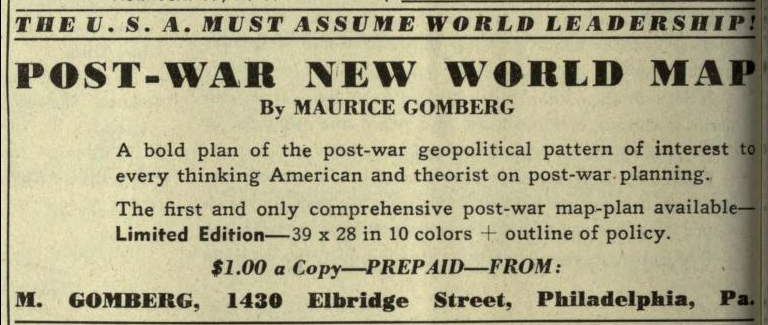
The map was self-published by Gomberg and offered for sale for $1 in magazines such as American Teacher in 1942 and Survey Graphic in 1944 (seen here).

The Outline of the Post-War New World Map was a map completed before the attack on Pearl Harbor and self-published on February 25, 1942 by Maurice Gomberg of Philadelphia, Pennsylvania. It shows a proposed political division of the world after World War II in the event of an Allied victory in which the United States of America, the United Kingdom, and the Soviet Union as well as the Republic of China would rule. The map includes a manifesto describing a "New World Moral Order", along with quotes from Roosevelt's Four Freedoms speech.

Gomberg, a Russian Jewish emigre to the United States, created the map as a personal project, and little else is known of him. The map has been highlighted by New World Order conspiracy theorists who believe it represents some broader view of the US government, and has also been widely circulated online.

== Description of proposed territories on map ==
The map proposes a total of 14 independent sovereign states, 4 military powers and 10 demilitarized states, and 3 "quarantined" states (the fate of 2 are to be eventually integrated into sovereign states).

=== Military powers ===
==== United States ====
The United States has 82 states, not including Security Outposts in the Pacific and the Atlantic, gaining all of Canada, Mexico, and Central America, among other places:

States: Alabama - Alberta - Alaska - Arizona - Arkansas - The Bahamas - California (historical Alta (Upper) California) - Colorado - Columbia - Connecticut - Costa Rica - Cuba - Delaware - Florida - Georgia - Greenland - Guatemala (Guatemala and Belize) - Haiti (including all of Hispaniola) - Honduras - Idaho - Illinois - Indiana - Iowa - Jamaica - Kansas - Keewatin (pre-1999 Northwest Territories east of the 110° meridian) - Kentucky - Labrador (mainland Newfoundland and Labrador) - Leeward Islands - Louisiana - Lower California (consisting of the Baja California peninsula) - Maine - Mackenzie (pre-1999 Northwest Territories west of the 110° meridian) - Manitoba - Maryland - Martinique - Massachusetts - Mexico (the remainder of Mexico) - Michigan - Minnesota - Mississippi - Missouri - Montana - Nevada - New Brunswick - Newfoundland (Island Newfoundland and Labrador) - New Hampshire - New Jersey - New Mexico - New York - Nicaragua - North Carolina - North Dakota - Nova Scotia - Ohio - Oklahoma - Ontario - Oregon - Panama - Pennsylvania - Prince Edward Island - Puerto Rico - Quebec - Rhode Island - El Salvador - Saskatchewan - South Carolina - South Dakota - Tennessee - Texas - Trinidad - Utah - Vermont - Virginia - Virgin Islands - Washington - West Virginia - Windward Islands - Wisconsin - Wyoming - Yukon

Protectorates: - Celebes - Hainan - Halmahera Islands - Iceland - Moluccas Islands - Commonwealth of the Philippines - Taiwan and Penghu

Port "Peace-security bases": Dakar and Freetown on the Atlantic coast of Africa and the islands of the Pacific, excluding Solomon Islands.

==== British Commonwealth of Nations ====
The British Commonwealth of Nations is headquartered in Britain. The Commonwealth includes the Faroe Islands and the former colonies of Madagascar (in early 1942 still a Vichy French colony), Ceylon, the Andaman Islands, Cyprus, Malta, most of Indonesia (in 1942 a Dutch colony occupied by Japan; other parts are given to the US) and the current Papua New Guinea, as well as the then British colonies that are now Singapore and Malaysian Borneo, South Georgia, the Bismarck Archipelago, the Solomon Islands, and the countries of Australia and New Zealand. It does not contain Northern Ireland, which is instead part of a united Ireland (Éire).

Port "Peace-security bases":

Gibraltar on the southern coast of Spain,
Alexandria, Algiers, Benghazi and Oran on the Mediterranean Sea coast of Africa,
Djibouti City and Port Sudan on the Red Sea coast of Africa,
Berbera, Mogadishu and Zanzibar on the Indian coast of Africa, and
Cabinda City and Cape Town on the Atlantic coast of Africa

==== Soviet Union - Union of Soviet Socialist Republics ====
The Soviet Union would expand to be far larger than its then-current size, expanding to 24 (later 25) Soviet Socialist Republics (while "downgrading" some SSR's to Autonomous Soviet Socialist Republics):

Soviet Socialist Republics: Armenia - Azerbaijan - Bulgaria - Czech Republic - Estonia - Finland - Georgia - Hungary - Iran - Latvia - Lithuania - Manchuria (Heilongjiang and Hulunbuir) - Moldavia (all of Bessarabia) - Mongolia - Poland - Romania - Russia (which includes Karelia, Karakalpakstan, Kazakhstan, and Kirghizia/Kyrgyzstan) - Slovakia - Tajikistan - Turkmenistan - Ukraine - Uzbekistan - White Russia (Byelorussia) - Yugoslavia
At an unspecified later time, Germany (which includes Austria but not East Prussia). Germany is termed quarantined Germany until full integration

==== South America - United States of South America ====
Everything below the Darién Gap, and offshore islands including the Falkland Islands:

- Argentina - Bolivia - Brazil - Chile - Colombia - Ecuador - Guiana - Paraguay - Peru - Uruguay - Venezuela

=== Demilitarized states ===
==== India - Federated Republics of India ====
The Federated Republics of India has a common capital Delhi. There are 22 states or provinces in the country. Goa is now the part of Federated Republics of India. States are:

Afghanistan - Baluchistan - Bhutan - Burma - Punjab - Bengal - Bihar - Andaman and Nicobar Islands - Ajmer-Merwara - Assam - Bombay - Central Provinces and Berar - Coorg - Delhi - Madras - North-West Frontier - Orissa - Panth Piploda - Goa - Sind - United Provinces - Nepal

==== China - United Republics of China ====
China (without Formosa or Hainan) - Inner Mongolia - Indochina (Cambodia, Laos, and Vietnam) - Korea - Malaya - Sinkiang - Thailand - Tibet

==== Europe - United States of Europe ====
Belgium (including Luxembourg) - France (including Monaco and all of Germany west of the Rhine river) - Netherlands - Portugal - San Marino (later included in Italy) - Spain (including Andorra) - Switzerland (including Liechtenstein) - Vatican City (later included in Italy)

At an unspecified later time, Italy (which is termed quarantined Italy until full integration)

==== Scandinavia - United States of Scandinavia ====
Denmark (without the Faroe Islands and Greenland) - Norway (including Spitsbergen, without Jan Mayen) - Sweden

==== Africa - Union of African Republics ====
Besides the port "peace-security bases", areas included are Algeria - Angola - Bechuanaland (Botswana) - Congo (including Burundi) - Dahomey (Benin, including Togo) - Egypt - Equatorial Africa (including Equatorial Guinea, eastern Guinea, and São Tomé and Príncipe) - Eritrea - Ethiopia (including Djibouti) - Gold Coast (Ghana) - Kenya - Liberia - Libya - Morocco - Mozambique (including southern Malawi) - Nigeria - Rhodesia (northern Malawi, Zambia, and Zimbabwe) - Senegal (including the Gambia, western Guinea, and Guinea-Bissau) - Somaliland (Somalia) - South Africa (including Lesotho and Swaziland) - South West Africa (Namibia) - Sudan - Tanganyika (including Rwanda) - Tunisia - Uganda - West Africa (including Sahrawi Arab Democratic Republic/Western Sahara and Sierra Leone, without Benin, Senegal, and Togo)

==== Arabia - Arabian Federated Republics ====
Aden (South Yemen) - Hejaz - Iraq (including Kuwait) - Lebanon - Oman (including Bahrain, Qatar, and United Arab Emirates) - Saudi Arabia - Syria - Yemen (North Yemen)

==== Greece - Federal Republic of Greece ====
Albania - Greece

Point #24 notes the inclusion of Macedonia, that "Macedonia" is not clearly defined; the map seems to not include the Socialist Republic of Macedonia (equivalent to modern North Macedonia), but rather labels Macedonia as Greek Macedonia.

==== Éire ====
Consists of the whole of the island of Ireland. At the time, the island was divided, with Northern Ireland part of the United Kingdom and Ireland (Éire) being independent.

==== Hebrewland ====
Includes all of modern Israel, Jordan and Palestine, taking in parts of modern Syria and a slice of northern Saudi Arabia.

==== Turkey ====
All of Asian Turkey. European Turkey would be placed under joint control of the USSR and Turkey - cf. points #27 and #28.

=== Quarantined nations ===
==== Nazi Germany ====
Mentioned as quarantined Germany, all of Weimar Republic territory east of the Rhine river but west of the former Polish Corridor, plus Austria, eventually supposed to become a full Soviet Socialist Republic in the Soviet Union

==== Kingdom of Italy ====
Mentioned as quarantined Italy, all of modern Italy and the Julian March (pre 1941), eventually supposed to become a full state in the United States of Europe

==== Empire of Japan ====
Mentioned as quarantined Japan, all of modern Japan and Iturup, Kunashir, Shikotan, Habomai (but not including Bonin Islands). Later fate presumed to be an independent democracy.

== See also ==
- New Order (Nazism)
- Axis powers negotiations on the division of Asia
- Alice Bailey
- The New World Order (Wells)
- Theosophical Society
- Political geography of Nineteen Eighty-Four
