= Guangrao County =

Guangrao County 广饶县 Kwangjao
- County
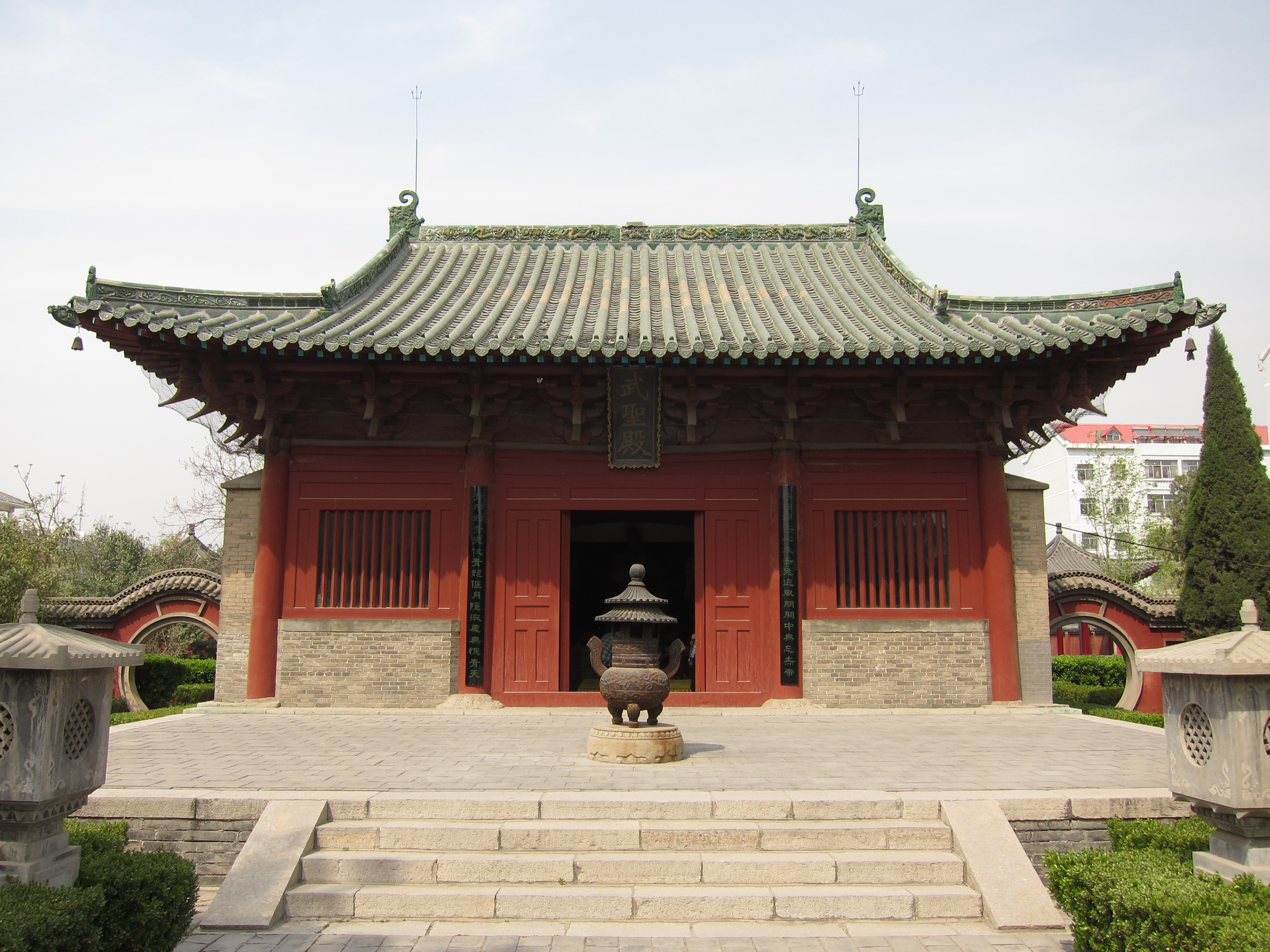
- Guangrao Guandi Temple, built in 1028, making it the oldest extant wooden building in Shandong

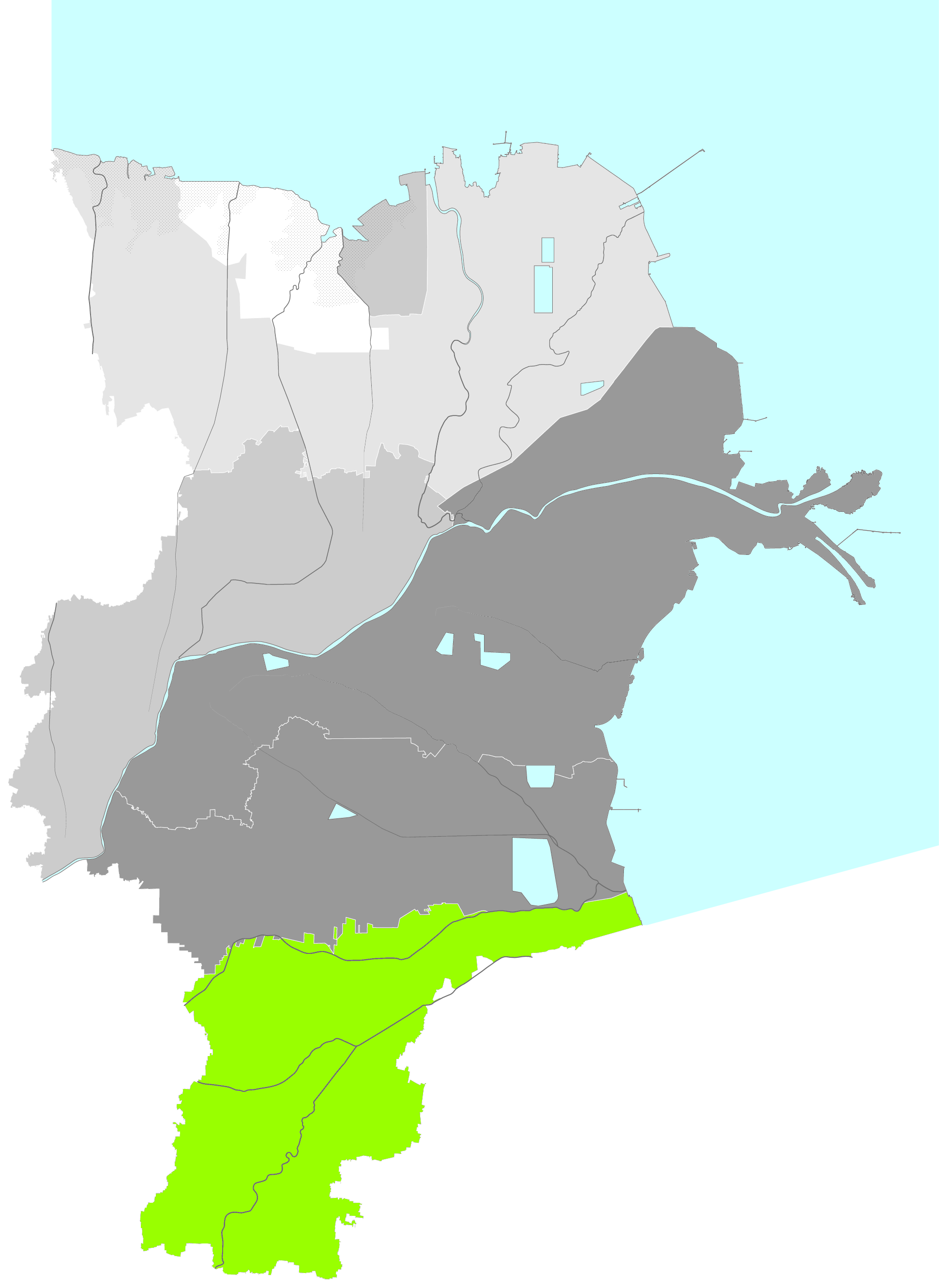
- Location in Dongying

- Location of the seat in Shandong
- Coordinates: 37°03′N 118°24′E
- Country: People's Republic of China
- Province: Shandong
- Prefecture-level city: Dongying

Area
  - Total: 1,137.9 km^{2} (439.3 sq mi)
- Elevation: 12 m (39 ft)

Population (2019)
  - Total: 533,893
  - Density: 469.19/km^{2} (1,215.2/sq mi)
- Time zone: UTC+8 (China Standard)
- Postal code: 257300

Guangrao County (simplified Chinese: 广饶县; traditional Chinese: 廣饒縣; pinyin: Guǎngráo Xiàn) is a county of Dongying City in north-central Shandong province, People's Republic of China. The southernmost county-level division of Dongying City, it lies halfway between the downtowns of Zibo and Dongying.

The population in 1999 was 470,198.

== Administrative divisions ==
As of 2012, this county is divided to 6 towns and 4 townships.

Towns

- Guangrao (广饶镇)
- Dawang (大王镇)
- Daozhuang (稻庄镇)
- Shicun (石村镇)
- Dingzhuang (丁庄镇)
- Lique (李鹊镇)

Townships

- Damatou Township (大码头乡)
- Xiliuqiao Township (西刘桥乡)
- Huaguan Township (花官乡)
- Chenguan Township (陈官乡)

== Climate ==
Climate data for Guangrao, elevation 14 m (46 ft), (1991–2020 normals, extremes 1991–present)
Month	Jan	Feb	Mar	Apr	May	Jun	Jul	Aug	Sep	Oct	Nov	Dec	Year
Record high °C (°F)	19.3 (66.7)	24.2 (75.6)	31.7 (89.1)	35.2 (95.4)	39.1 (102.4)	41.6 (106.9)	40.1 (104.2)	37.6 (99.7)	38.2 (100.8)	34.6 (94.3)	26.2 (79.2)	19.5 (67.1)	41.6 (106.9)
Mean daily maximum °C (°F)	3.7 (38.7)	7.5 (45.5)	14.2 (57.6)	21.2 (70.2)	26.9 (80.4)	31.3 (88.3)	32.3 (90.1)	30.8 (87.4)	27.3 (81.1)	21.2 (70.2)	12.9 (55.2)	5.7 (42.3)	19.6 (67.3)
Daily mean °C (°F)	−2.3 (27.9)	1.1 (34.0)	7.3 (45.1)	14.3 (57.7)	20.4 (68.7)	25.1 (77.2)	27.2 (81.0)	25.9 (78.6)	21.3 (70.3)	14.5 (58.1)	6.6 (43.9)	−0.2 (31.6)	13.4 (56.2)
Mean daily minimum °C (°F)	−6.6 (20.1)	−3.7 (25.3)	1.6 (34.9)	8.2 (46.8)	14.2 (57.6)	19.4 (66.9)	22.9 (73.2)	21.9 (71.4)	16.2 (61.2)	9.2 (48.6)	1.7 (35.1)	−4.5 (23.9)	8.4 (47.1)
Record low °C (°F)	−18.0 (−0.4)	−15.3 (4.5)	−8.9 (16.0)	−4.3 (24.3)	2.7 (36.9)	8.5 (47.3)	15.2 (59.4)	13.0 (55.4)	4.8 (40.6)	−2.2 (28.0)	−10.7 (12.7)	−16.2 (2.8)	−18.0 (−0.4)
Average precipitation mm (inches)	5.6 (0.22)	12.5 (0.49)	10.6 (0.42)	25.6 (1.01)	58.4 (2.30)	81.2 (3.20)	143.8 (5.66)	163.4 (6.43)	49.2 (1.94)	26.2 (1.03)	24.3 (0.96)	7.5 (0.30)	608.3 (23.96)
Average precipitation days (≥ 0.1 mm)	2.3	3.1	3.3	5.4	6.6	7.8	11.4	11.2	6.4	5.5	4.3	3.3	70.6
Average snowy days	2.8	2.7	1.3	0.1	0	0	0	0	0	0	0.6	2.2	9.7
Average relative humidity (%)	61	57	51	54	59	61	74	78	71	67	66	64	64
Mean monthly sunshine hours	159.6	165.5	214.1	229.7	258.9	224.5	192.1	190.0	189.0	191.7	157.8	153.8	2,326.7
Percentage possible sunshine	52	54	57	58	59	51	43	46	51	56	52	52	53
Source: China Meteorological Administration
