= Ma Jian (politician) =

Chinese politician

- 马建

Vice Minister of State Security
- In office 2006 – January 2015
- Minister: Geng Huichang
- Succeeded by: Su Deliang

Personal details
- Born: September 1956 (age 70) Jiangxi, China
- Party: Chinese Communist Party (expelled)
- Education: Southwest University of Political Science & Law

Chinese name
- Simplified Chinese: 马建
- Traditional Chinese: 馬建
Transcriptions
Standard Mandarin
- Hanyu Pinyin: Mǎ Jiàn

Ma Jian (Chinese: 马建; born September 1956) is a former Chinese security official. In January 2015, he was put under investigation by the Chinese Communist Party's Central Commission for Discipline Inspection. He served as the vice minister of State Security, and also vice president of the China Law Society. He was a member of the 12th National Committee of the Chinese People's Political Consultative Conference, but is currently in prison serving a life sentence for corruption.

== Life and career ==
Ma was born and raised in Jiangxi, a province in eastern China. He graduated from Southwest University of Political Science and Law. He spent the majority of his career in the national security system.

In 2006, Ma was appointed the vice minister of State Security, he remained in that position until January 2015, when he was being investigated for suspected serious violation of disciplines and laws.

Ma reportedly had six mistresses and two illegitimate children. In December 2016, Ma was expelled from the Communist Party. In his expulsion announcement, the Central Commission for Discipline Inspection accused Ma of using his position of power to obtain travel documents for his family, and taking bribes. His case was forwarded to judicial authorities for prosecution. Ma was reportedly the director of the Ministry's No. 8 Bureau, responsible for counter-espionage activities targeting foreigners.

On December 27, 2018, Ma was sentenced to life in prison by the Intermediate People's Court in Dalian for taking bribes worth 109 million yuan, forcing others to make business deals, and illegally making 49.29 million yuan of gains from insider trading. It was claimed that most of the bribes were paid to Ma by the exiled businessman Guo Wengui in order to help further his business interests.
