= 1878 Invercargill mayoral election =

1878 mayoral election in Invercargill

← 1877	22 July 1878	1879 →
- Turnout: 514
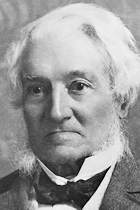

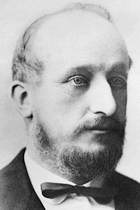
Candidate	George Lumsden	Joseph Hatch
Party	Independent	Independent
Popular vote	277	237
Percentage	53.89	46.10
Mayor before election
Joseph Hatch
Elected mayor
George Lumsden

The mayoral election took place in Invercargill, New Zealand, on 22 July 1878.

The incumbent mayor Joseph Hatch was defeated by the former mayor George Lumsden.

== Results ==
The following table gives the election results:

1878 Invercargill mayoral election
Party	Candidate	Votes	%	±%
Independent	George Lumsden	277	53.89	
Independent	Joseph Hatch	237	46.10	−12.55
Majority		40	7.79	
Turnout		514		
