= 1877 Invercargill mayoral election =

1877 mayoral election in Invercargill, New Zealand

← 1876	21 July 1877	1878 →
- Turnout: 416
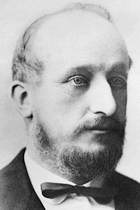

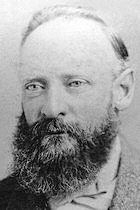
Candidate	Joseph Hatch	William Horatio Hall
Party	Independent	Independent
Popular vote	244	172
Percentage	58.65	41.34
Mayor before election
John Cuthbertson
Elected mayor
Joseph Hatch

The 1877 Invercargill mayoral election was held on 21 July 1877.

Joseph Hatch was elected mayor.

== Results ==
The following table gives the election results:

1877 Invercargill mayoral election
Party	Candidate	Votes	%	±%
Independent	Joseph Hatch	244	58.65	
Independent	William Horatio Hall	172	41.34	
Majority		72	17.31	
Turnout		416		
