= 1878 Invercargill by-election =

1878 by-election in Invercargill, New Zealand

- 17 July 1878
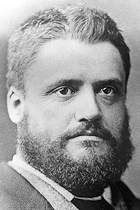
	Henry Feldwick
Candidate	Henry Feldwick	James Walker Bain
Party	Independent	Independent
Popular vote	230	219
Percentage	51.22	48.78
Member before election
George Lumsden
Independent
Elected Member
Henry Feldwick
Independent

The 1878 Invercargill by-election was a by-election during the 6th New Zealand Parliament in the Southland electorate of Invercargill. The by-election occurred following the resignation of MP George Lumsden and was won by Henry Feldwick.

== Background ==
George Lumsden, who was first elected to represent Invercargill in the 1875 election, resigned in 1878. This triggered the Invercargill by-election, which was held on 17 July 1878. Two independent candidates contested the election, Henry Feldwick and James Walker Bain. Feldwick obtained 51.22% of the votes and was successful.

== Previous election ==
1875 general election: Invercargill
Party	Candidate	Votes	%	±%
Independent	George Lumsden	180	53.10	+53.10
Independent	John Cuthbertson	159	46.90	−5.58
Majority		21	6.19	
Turnout		339		

== Results ==
1878 Invercargill by-election
Party	Candidate	Votes	%	±%
Independent	Henry Feldwick	230	51.22	+51.22
Independent	James Walker Bain	219	48.78	+48.78
Majority		11	2.45	
Turnout		449		

== See also ==
- List of New Zealand by-elections
- 1873 Invercargill by-election
- 1930 Invercargill by-election
