= 1873 Invercargill by-election =

1873 by-election in Invercargill, New Zealand

- 22 May 1873
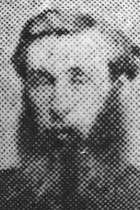

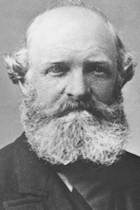
Candidate	John Cuthbertson	William Wood
Party	Independent	Independent
Popular vote	159	144
Percentage	52.48	47.52
Member before election
William Henderson Calder
Independent
Elected Member
John Cuthbertson
Independent

The 1873 Invercargill by-election was a by-election during the 5th New Zealand Parliament in the Southland electorate of Invercargill. The by-election occurred following the resignation of MP William Henderson Calder and was won by John Cuthbertson.

== Background ==
William Henderson Calder, who was first elected to represent Invercargill in the 1871 election, resigned in 1873. This triggered the Invercargill by-election, which was held on 22 May 1873. Two independent candidates contested the election, John Cuthbertson and William Wood. Cuthbertson obtained 52.48% of the votes and was successful.

== Previous election ==
1871 general election: Invercargill
Party	Candidate	Votes	%	±%
Independent	William Henderson Calder	142	61.21	+61.21
Independent	George Lumsden	90	38.79	+38.79
Majority		52	22.41	
Turnout		232		

== Results ==
1873 Invercargill by-election
Party	Candidate	Votes	%	±%
Independent	John Cuthbertson	159	52.48	
Independent	William Wood	144	47.52	
Majority		15	4.95	
Turnout		303		

== See also ==
- List of New Zealand by-elections
- 1878 Invercargill by-election
- 1930 Invercargill by-election
