= 1930 Invercargill by-election =

1930 by-election in Invercargill, New Zealand

- 13 August 1930
- Turnout: 9,842 (79.50%)
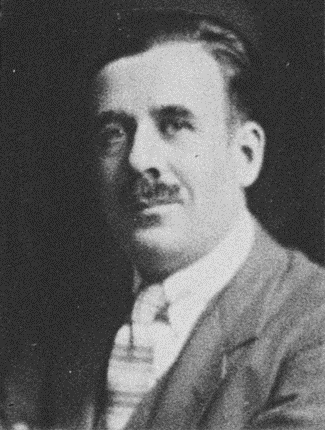

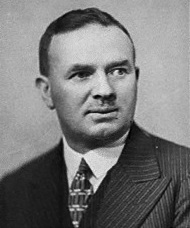
Candidate	Vincent Ward	James Hargest
Party	United	Reform
Popular vote	5,194	4,623
Percentage	52.91	47.09
Member before election
Sir Joseph Ward
United
Elected Member
Vincent Ward
United

The 1930 Invercargill by-election was a by-election during the 23rd New Zealand Parliament in the Southland electorate of Invercargill. The by-election occurred following the death of Sir Joseph Ward on 8 July 1930. The by-election, which was held on 13 August, was won by the late Prime Minister's second son, Vincent Ward against James Hargest.

== Background ==
Sir Joseph Ward had suffered a defeat in the 1919 election, was ageing and often of poor health. It was generally expected that his political career was over. He attempted a comeback but suffered a humiliating defeat in the 1923 by-election in the Tauranga electorate. He managed to get re-elected in the Invercargill electorate in the 1925 election, when he had a "wafer-thin 159-vote victory" over James Hargest of the Reform Party.

Sir Joseph contested the 1928 election as the new leader of the United Party against the solicitor Stanley Morell Macalister (known as Morell Macalister), who stood for Reform. Soon after the 1928 election, Sir Joseph became Prime Minister for the second time. Under pressure from party colleagues, he resigned as Prime Minister due to ill health in May 1930. Sir Joseph died less than two months later on 8 July.

== Candidates ==
Over the last years, Vincent Ward had acted as a political assistant to his father. He was nominated by the United Party in the resulting by-election, which was held on 13 August. His selection was not supported by all, and some had preferred William Hinchey, a former Mayor of Bluff.

Ward Jr. was opposed by James Hargest, who had been narrowly beaten by Ward Sr. in the 1925 general election. Hargest was regarded as a capable candidate, and he dealt with being heckled in large meetings quite well. Hargest claimed that as a director of a North Island company, Ward as an absentee could not effectively represent the Invercargill electorate. Hargest also appealed to Labour voters that he worked as hard as they did. He defended himself against the view that it should be Ward's right to succeed his father.

Just before nominations closed, the independent candidate William Hinchey withdrew from the contest. The local Labour Party branch apparently had decided on the Rev John Archer, at the time the Mayor of Christchurch, as their first choice. Second choice was William Denham an Invercargill City Councillor (who was elected as Invercargill's MP in 1935). Then, Tom O'Byrne was considered as a candidate. The local Labour Representation Committee were keen to stand a candidate but were overruled by the Labour Party's national executive, who made the decision not to stand a candidate. This decision was mocked in the press as being undemocratic.

Election meetings were well attended. Hargest had over 2000 attendees at his last meeting in the town hall.

== Election results ==
=== Previous election ===
1928 general election: Invercargill
Party	Candidate	Votes	%	±%
United	Sir Joseph Ward	7,309	63.89	+16.98
Reform	Morell Macalister	4,131	36.11	
Majority		3,178	27.78	+26.27
Informal votes		88	0.76	+0.25
Turnout		11,528		

=== By-election results ===
Hargest was beaten in by Ward Jr., who had a majority of 571 votes (5.82%).

1930 Invercargill by-election
Party	Candidate	Votes	%	±%
United	Vincent Ward	5,194	52.91	
Reform	James Hargest	4,623	47.09	
Majority		571	5.82	
Informal votes		25	0.25	−0.51
Turnout		9,842	79.50	−13.62
Registered electors		12,380		

Vincent Ward retired at the end of the term in 1931. Hargest won the 1931 election in the Invercargill electorate and remained an MP until his death in 1944. Ward was called to the Legislative Council in 1934 and served there until his death in 1946.

== See also ==
- List of New Zealand by-elections
- 1873 Invercargill by-election
- 1878 Invercargill by-election
