= Aubrey Begg =

New Zealand politician

Member of the New Zealand Parliament for Awarua
- In office 25 November 1972 – 29 November 1975
- Preceded by: Hugh Templeton
- Succeeded by: Rex Austin

Personal details
- Born: 9 April 1929 Balclutha, New Zealand
- Died: 7 November 1988 (aged 59) Invercargill, New Zealand
- Party: Labour
- Spouse: Joy Rose Wright (m. 1954)
- Children: 4

Aubrey Wilbert Begg (9 April 1929 – 7 November 1988) was a New Zealand Member of Parliament, for Awarua in Southland.

== Biography ==
=== Early life and career ===
Begg was born in Balclutha, educated at Southland Boys' High School, and was a farmer near Invercargill. In 1954 he married Joy Rose Wright with whom he had three sons and one daughter. Through his involvement in farming, Begg became an executive member of Federated Farmers and later was its junior vice-president of the meat and wool section.

He was described as a "true son of Southland" who never gave up his independence. Parliamentary colleague Colin Moyle stated Begg paid a price for his individualism and his lack of teamwork cost him the advancement that he could have had.

=== Political career ===
New Zealand Parliament
| Years | Term | Electorate | Party |
|---|---|---|---|
| 1972–1975 | 37th | Awarua | Labour |

Begg first stood for the New Zealand House of Representatives in 1966 in the "true blue" electorate of Wallace against cabinet minister Brian Talboys. Despite losing he was well remembered in the electorate, particularly for winning a majority at the pooling booth in Drummond which was normally a National Party stronghold. Three years later he contested the nearby seat of Awarua for Labour but lost to National's Hugh Templeton by 906 votes. However Begg in turn defeated Templeton by 700 votes at the 1972 election as part of Labour's landslide victory. He held the seat for one term until he was defeated in 1975. He quickly earned a reputation for speaking forthrightly on farming issues particularly in favour of meat producers. Notably he was a strong opponent of a scheme to acquire compulsorily the wool clip despite the scheme being supported by the Third Labour Government.

Following his defeat he stood for the vice-presidency of the Labour Party at the 1976 party conference. He lost to Gerald O'Brien, placing third in the delegate ballot with 135 votes compared to O'Brien's 585 votes and 344 for Dorothy Jelicich. Begg became a member of Labour's party executive and chairman of Labour's Agricultural Advisory Committee.

In the 1978 election, he was the Labour candidate for Invercargill losing by the narrow margin of 256 votes to Norman Jones. At the 1981 election, he stood unsuccessfully once again in Wallace, this time as an independent candidate attracting over 2,000 votes, far more than usual for an independent.

=== Later life and death ===
After exiting parliament Begg became President of the Southland branch of Federated Farmers.

In August 1988 was taken ill and underwent exploratory surgery for what was found to be cancer. He died on 7 November 1988 in Invercargill, aged 59.

New Zealand Parliament
| Preceded by Hugh Templeton | Member of Parliament for Awarua; 1972–1975 | Succeeded by Rex Austin |
