= Vincent Ward =

Vincent Ward may refer to:

- Vincent Ward (director) (born 1956), New Zealand film director, screenwriter and artist
- Vincent Ward (politician) (1886–1946), New Zealand politician
- Vincent Ward (swimmer) (1921–2016), American Paralympic swimmer
- Vincent M. Ward (born 1971), American actor
