= 1879 Invercargill mayoral election =

1879 mayoral election in Invercargill, New Zealand

- 21 July 1879
- Turnout: 623
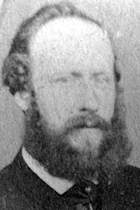

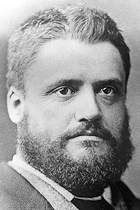
| Candidate | George Goodwillie | James Walker Bain |
| Party | Independent | Independent |
| Popular vote | 314 | 309 |
| Percentage | 50.40 | 49.60 |
Mayor before election
George Lumsden
Elected mayor
George Goodwillie

The 1879 Invercargill mayoral election was held on 21 July 1879.

Councillor George Goodwillie defeated James Walker Bain.

== Results ==
The following table gives the election results:

1879 Invercargill mayoral election
| Party | Candidate | Votes | % | ±% |
|---|---|---|---|---|
| Independent | George Goodwillie | 314 | 50.40 | |
| Independent | James Walker Bain | 309 | 49.60 | |
| Majority | | 5 | 0.80 | |
| Turnout | | 623 | | |
