= Jeff Grant (politician) =

New Zealand politician (born 1958)

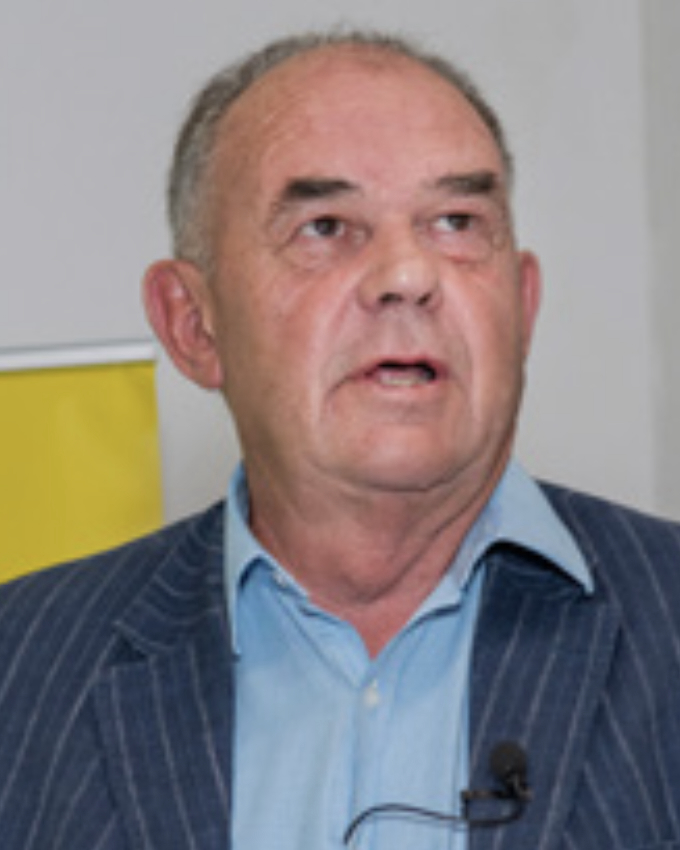
- Grant in 2023

Member of the New Zealand Parliament for Awarua
- In office 1987–1993
- Preceded by: Rex Austin
- Succeeded by: Eric Roy

Personal details
- Born: Jeffrey James Grant; 1958 (age 67–68)
- Party: National
- Education: Lincoln College

Jeffrey James Grant (born 1958) is a former New Zealand politician of the National Party.

== Education ==
Grant was educated at Otago Boys' High School, and went on to study Lincoln College, where he earned a Diploma in Agriculture.

== Career ==
New Zealand Parliament
Years	Term	Electorate	Party
1987–1990	42nd	Awarua	National
1990–1993	43rd	Awarua	National

Grant represented the Southland electorate of Awarua in Parliament from 1987 to 1993. Between 1990 and 1993, he served as the National Party's chief whip. He retired from Parliament in 1993, and was replaced by Eric Roy.

Grant later worked in a large number of governance roles, including for Landcorp, the New Zealand Meat Board, AgResearch, SBS Bank and the Southern Institute of Technology. In 2020, he was appointed as an independent advisor to support the Invercargill City Council, following a review by the Department of Internal Affairs into Tim Shadbolt, the mayor of Invercargill.

== Honours and awards ==
In 1990, Grant received the New Zealand 1990 Commemoration Medal. In 2021, he was awarded the Bledisloe Medal by his alma mater, Lincoln University, in recognition of his contribution to the rural sector.

New Zealand Parliament
Preceded by Rex Austin	Member of Parliament for Awarua; 1987–1993	Succeeded by Eric Roy
