= Invercargill (electorate) =

- Single-member general constituency for the New Zealand House of Representatives
- Interactive map of boundaries from the 2026 election
- Formation: 1886
- Region: Southland
- Character: Urban and rural
- Term: 3 years

Member for Invercargill
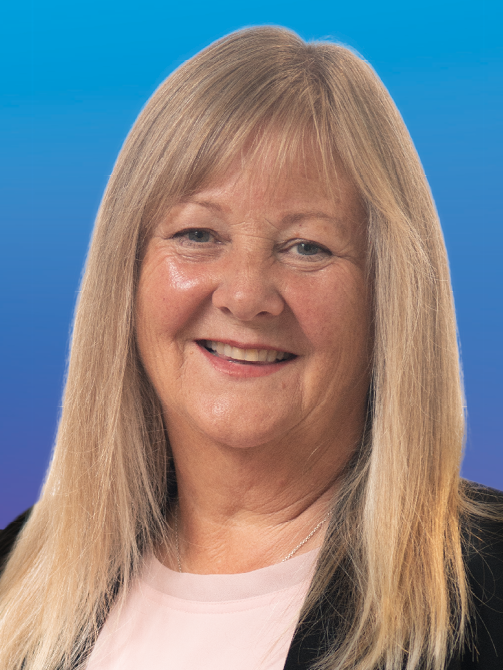
- Penny Simmonds since 14 October 2023
- Party: National
- Previous MP: Sarah Dowie (National)
Party vote distribution

Invercargill is an electorate of the New Zealand Parliament that has existed since 1866. Since the 2020 election, the electorate's representative is Penny Simmonds of the National Party.

== Population centres ==
Map of boundaries at the 2020 and 2023 general elections

The electorate covers Invercargill city and the surrounding rural communities, including Bluff, Riverton / Aparima, Wallacetown and Stewart Island / Rakiura. In 1996 a boundary redistribution resulted in the abolition of the Awarua electorate and merged with Invercargill following re-drawing of boundaries due to the introduction of mixed-member proportional voting (MMP). Minor but steady population decline in the Southland region has generally resulted in Invercargill expanding northwards. The 2013 redistribution, however, has left Invercargill unchanged. The 2020 redistribution added a large area around Clifden and Tuatapere. The 2025 boundary review saw the communities of Heddon Bush, Drummond and Isla Bank transferred to the electorate from Southland.

== History ==
The electorate was established in 1866 when it separated from the Wallace electorate.

The first representative was William Wood, who won the 1866 election. Wood retired at the end of the parliamentary term in 1870. William Henderson Calder succeeded Wood in the 1871 election and he resigned in March 1873. The resulting 1873 by-election was won by John Cuthbertson, who served until the end of the parliamentary term in 1875.

Cuthbertson was defeated by George Lumsden in the 1875 election. Lumsden resigned in June 1878, which caused the 1878 by-election. Henry Feldwick was the successful candidate and he commenced his first of three terms for the electorate. At the 1879 election, Feldwick was defeated by James Walker Bain, who retired at the end of the parliamentary term in 1881. At the 1881 election, Feldwick was again the successful candidate, only to be defeated again at the 1884 election, on that occasion by Joseph Hatch. At the 1887 election, Feldwick defeated Hatch and commenced his third and final term for the Invercargill electorate, serving until the end of the parliamentary term in 1890.

James Whyte Kelly defeated Feldwick in the 1890 election. Kelly became a member of the Liberal Party and served for three parliamentary terms, but broke away from the Liberal Party and became an Independent Liberal in 1895. For the 1899 election, the Josiah Hanan of the Liberal Party challenged Kelly, with Hanan being successful. Hanan served the electorate until 1925, when he retired.

The 1925 election was narrowly won by the former Prime Minister Sir Joseph Ward standing for the Liberal Party, who beat James Hargest of the Reform Party with 4957 votes to 4798; a third contender, Patrick Hickey, stood for the Labour Party. Until 1919, Ward had for many years represented Awarua. Ward, a former leader of the Liberal Party, contested the election under the "Liberal" label, despite the fact that the remnants of the Liberal Party were now calling themselves by different names. In 1928, Ward helped form the United Party and won the 1928 election. He died on 8 July 1930, which caused the 1930 by-election won by his son Vincent Ward, who retired at the end of the parliamentary term in 1931.

Vincent Ward was succeeded by James Hargest in the 1931 election. At the end of the parliamentary term in 1935, Hargest successfully contested the Awarua electorate. He was succeeded in the Invercargill electorate by William Denham of the Labour Party, who held the electorate for three terms from 1935 until his defeat in the 1946 election by Ralph Hanan of the National Party. Hanan was re-elected seven times and died in office on 24 July 1969; the need to hold a by-election before the general election on 29 November was avoided by a special act, the By-election Postponement Act 1969.

The successful candidate in the 1969 general election was John Chewings, who was defeated at the end of the parliamentary term at the 1972 election by Labour's J. B. Munro. At the next election in 1975, Munro was in turn beaten by National's Norman Jones. Jones retired at the end of his fourth term in August 1987 and died shortly thereafter on 19 November.

Jones was succeeded by National's Rob Munro in the 1987 election. Munro served two parliamentary terms before being beaten by Labour's Mark Peck in the 1993 election. Peck retired after four parliamentary terms in 2005 and was succeeded by National's Eric Roy in the 2005 election. Roy retired after three parliamentary terms and was succeeded in 2014 by Sarah Dowie.

=== Members of Parliament ===
Key

Independent Liberal Liberal–Labour

United Labour National NZ First

Election	Winner
1866 election	William Wood
1871 election	William Henderson Calder
1873 by-election	John Cuthbertson
1875 election	George Lumsden
1878 by-election	Henry Feldwick
1879 election	James Walker Bain
1881 election	Henry Feldwick (2nd time)
1884 election	Joseph Hatch
1887 election	Henry Feldwick (3rd time)
1890 election	James Whyte Kelly
1893 election	James Whyte Kelly
1896 election	James Whyte Kelly
1899 election	Josiah Hanan
1902 election	Josiah Hanan
1905 election	Josiah Hanan
1908 election	Josiah Hanan
1911 election	Josiah Hanan
1914 election	Josiah Hanan
1919 election	Josiah Hanan
1922 election	Josiah Hanan
1925 election	Joseph Ward
1928 election	Joseph Ward
1930 by-election	Vincent Ward
1931 election	James Hargest
1935 election	William Denham
1938 election	William Denham
1943 election	William Denham
1946 election	Ralph Hanan
1949 election	Ralph Hanan
1951 election	Ralph Hanan
1954 election	Ralph Hanan
1957 election	Ralph Hanan
1960 election	Ralph Hanan
1963 election	Ralph Hanan
1966 election	Ralph Hanan
1969 election	John Chewings
1972 election	J. B. Munro
1975 election	Norman Jones
1978 election	Norman Jones
1981 election	Norman Jones
1984 election	Norman Jones
1987 election	Rob Munro
1990 election	Rob Munro
1993 election	Mark Peck
1996 election	Mark Peck
1999 election	Mark Peck
2002 election	Mark Peck
2005 election	Eric Roy
2008 election	Eric Roy
2011 election	Eric Roy
2014 election	Sarah Dowie
2017 election	Sarah Dowie
2020 election	Penny Simmonds
2023 election	Penny Simmonds

=== List MPs ===
Members of Parliament elected from party lists in elections where that person also unsuccessfully contested the Invercargill electorate. Unless otherwise stated, all MPs terms began and ended at general elections.

Election	Winner
1996 election	Eric Roy
1999 election	Eric Roy
2015	Ria Bond (Note: Bond entered parliament as a list MP on 28 April 2015 after Winston Peters won the 2015 Northland by-election.)
2017 election	Liz Craig
2020 election	Liz Craig

== Election results ==
=== 2026 election ===
The next election will be held on 7 November 2026. Candidates for Invercargill are listed at Candidates in the 2026 New Zealand general election by electorate § Invercargill. Official results will be available after 27 November 2026.

=== 2023 election ===
2023 general election: Invercargill
Notes:	Blue background denotes the winner of the electorate vote. Pink background denotes a candidate elected from their party list. Yellow background denotes an electorate win by a list member, or other incumbent. A ✓ or ✗ denotes status of any incumbent, win or lose respectively.						
Party	Candidate	Votes	%	±%	Party votes	%	±%
National	✓ Penny Simmonds	20,819	55.61	+10.95	16,027	42.48	+12.74
Labour	Liz Craig	10,945	29.23	–14.87	9,589	25.42	–22.31
ACT	Ian Scott Donaldson	1,990	5.31	—	3,967	10.51	+0.99
NZ Loyal	David Kowalewski	1,760	4.70	—	1,099	2.91	—
Legalise Cannabis	Kevin Patrick O'Connell	1,072	2.86	—	235	0.62	+0.07
Vision NZ	Judith Terril	307	0.82	—			
NZ First					2,778	7.36	+4.34
Green					2,332	6.18	+2.74
Opportunities					482	1.72	+0.65
Te Pāti Māori					278	0.73	+0.54
NewZeal					212	0.56	+0.17
Freedoms NZ					137	0.36	—
Animal Justice					68	0.18	—
New Conservatives					54	0.14	–2.00
DemocracyNZ					48	0.12	—
Women's Rights					38	0.10	—
Leighton Baker Party					32	0.08	—
New Nation					29	0.07	—
Informal votes		540			315		
Total valid votes		37,433			37,720		
National hold	Majority	9,874	26.37	+26.93			

=== 2020 election ===
2020 general election: Invercargill
Notes:	Blue background denotes the winner of the electorate vote. Pink background denotes a candidate elected from their party list. Yellow background denotes an electorate win by a list member, or other incumbent. A ✓ or ✗ denotes status of any incumbent, win or lose respectively.						
Party	Candidate	Votes	%	±%	Party votes	%	±%
National	Penny Simmonds	17,929	44.66	−6.39	11,996	29.74	−18.65
Labour	Liz Craig	17,705	44.10	+8.79	19,252	47.73	+11.91
Green	Rochelle Francis	1,137	2.83	−1.75	1,386	3.44	+0.2
New Conservative	Joshua Honiss	757	1.88	—	862	2.14	–1.92
NZ First	Joshua Gunn	735	1.83	–7.23	1,218	3.02	−5.70
Advance NZ	Kurt Rohloff	417	1.04	—	406	1.01	—
ONE	Jackie West	237	0.59	—	158	0.39	—
Social Credit	Winsome Aroha	206	0.51	—	81	0.20	+0.08
Independent	Basil Walker	187	0.46	—			
Independent	Zy Haden	102	0.25	—			
ACT					3,846	9.52	+9.27
Opportunities					433	1.07	–1.04
Legalise Cannabis					220	0.55	+0.16
Māori Party					76	0.19	−0.01
Outdoors					44	0.11	+0.06
Sustainable NZ					20	0.05	—
TEA					16	0.04	—
Heartland					8	0.019	—
Vision NZ					8	0.019	—
Informal votes		735			308		
Total valid votes		35,462			35,990		
Turnout		40,338					
National hold	Majority	224	0.56	−15.17			

=== 2017 election ===
2017 general election: Invercargill
Notes:	Blue background denotes the winner of the electorate vote. Pink background denotes a candidate elected from their party list. Yellow background denotes an electorate win by a list member, or other incumbent. A ✓ or ✗ denotes status of any incumbent, win or lose respectively.						
Party	Candidate	Votes	%	±%	Party votes	%	±%
National	✓ Sarah Dowie	18,102	51.05	−0.43	17,414	48.39	−0.87
Labour	Liz Craig	12,523	35.31	+5.81	12,891	35.82	+10.86
NZ First	Ria Bond	3,214	9.06	+1.64	3,139	8.72	−2.39
Green	Rochelle Surendran	1,623	4.58	−2.75	1,166	3.24	−4.29
Opportunities					760	2.11	—
Legalise Cannabis					141	0.39	−0.26
Ban 1080					103	0.29	−0.21
ACT					95	0.26	−0.07
Conservative					79	0.22	−3.45
Māori Party					73	0.20	−0.12
Democrats					43	0.12	−0.16
United Future					27	0.08	−0.12
Outdoors					23	0.06	—
People's Party					21	0.06	—
Internet					9	0.03	−0.58 (Note: 2017 Internet Party swing is relative to the votes for Internet-Mana in 2014; it shared a party list with Mana Party in the 2014 election)
Mana Party					6	0.02	−0.59 (Note: 2017 Mana Party swing is relative to the votes for Internet-Mana in 2014; it shared a party list with the Internet Party in the 2014 election)
Informal votes		445			163		
Total valid votes		35,462			35,990		
Turnout		36,153					
National hold	Majority	5,579	15.73	−6.25			

=== 2014 election ===
2014 general election: Invercargill
Notes:	Blue background denotes the winner of the electorate vote. Pink background denotes a candidate elected from their party list. Yellow background denotes an electorate win by a list member, or other incumbent. A ✓ or ✗ denotes status of any incumbent, win or lose respectively.						
Party	Candidate	Votes	%	±%	Party votes	%	±%
National	Sarah Dowie	17,526	51.48	−3.10	16,880	49.26	−0.62
Labour	Lesley Soper	10,044	29.50	−5.29	8,553	24.96	−3.77
NZ First	Ria Bond	2,526	7.42	+7.42	3,806	11.11	+4.27
Green	David Kennedy	2,497	7.33	−0.36	2,581	7.53	−0.89
Conservative	Laura Storr	719	2.11	+2.11	1,256	3.67	+2.68
Democrats	Stephnie de Ruyter	333	0.98	−0.67	95	0.28	−0.12
Legalise Cannabis					224	0.65	−0.14
Internet Mana					210	0.61	+0.42 (Note: 2014 Internet Mana swing is relative to the votes for Mana in 2011; it shared a party list with Internet in the 2014 election.)
Ban 1080					173	0.50	−0.32
ACT					113	0.33	−0.90
Māori Party					110	0.32	−0.18
United Future					68	0.20	−0.62
Civilian					23	0.07	+0.07
Independent Coalition					11	0.03	+0.03
Focus					10	0.03	+0.03
Informal votes		400			153		
Total valid votes		34,045			34,266		
Turnout		34,292	76.48	+4.60			
National hold	Majority	7,482	21.98	+2.19			

=== 2011 election ===
2011 general election: Invercargill
Notes:	Blue background denotes the winner of the electorate vote. Pink background denotes a candidate elected from their party list. Yellow background denotes an electorate win by a list member, or other incumbent. A ✓ or ✗ denotes status of any incumbent, win or lose respectively.						
Party	Candidate	Votes	%	±%	Party votes	%	±%
National	✓ Eric Roy	17,275	54.58	−1.39	16,140	49.88	+2.35
Labour	Lesley Soper	11,012	34.79	−1.96	9,296	28.73	−8.15
Green	David Kennedy	2,433	7.69	+2.73	2,723	8.42	+4.16
Democrats	Stephnie de Ruyter	521	1.65	+1.65	129	0.40	+0.22
ACT	Ian Carline	276	0.87	−0.33	397	1.23	−1.47
Libertarianz	Shane Pleasance	133	0.42	+0.04	34	0.11	+0.05
NZ First					2,213	6.84	+3.44
Conservative					643	1.99	+1.99
United Future					264	0.82	−0.09
Legalise Cannabis					257	0.79	+0.28
Māori Party					162	0.50	−0.08
Mana					63	0.19	+0.19
Alliance					34	0.11	−0.05
Informal votes		863			324		
Total valid votes		31,650			32,355		
National hold	Majority	6,263	19.79	0.58			

Electorate (as at 26 November 2011): 45,014

=== 2008 election ===
2008 general election: Invercargill
Notes:	Blue background denotes the winner of the electorate vote. Pink background denotes a candidate elected from their party list. Yellow background denotes an electorate win by a list member, or other incumbent. A ✓ or ✗ denotes status of any incumbent, win or lose respectively.						
Party	Candidate	Votes	%	±%	Party votes	%	±%
National	✓ Eric Roy	19,414	55.97	+6.46	16,663	47.54	+8.05
Labour	Lesley Soper	12,750	36.76	−6.22	12,927	36.88	−8.30
Green	Craig Carson	1,718	4.95	+2.07	1,492	4.26	+1.18
ACT	Ian Carline	416	1.20	+0.06	947	2.70	+1.55
United Future	Maureen Smith	258	0.74	−0.70	319	0.91	−2.31
Libertarianz	Shane Pleasance	131	0.38	–	21	0.06	+0.03
NZ First					1,192	3.40	−1.41
Bill and Ben					413	1.18	–
Progressive					292	0.83	−0.39
Māori Party					205	0.58	+0.25
Legalise Cannabis					179	0.51	+0.21
Family Party					145	0.41	–
Kiwi					105	0.30	–
Democrats					61	0.17	−0.02
Alliance					54	0.15	+0.08
Pacific					18	0.05	–
Workers Party					14	0.04	–
RONZ					4	0.01	-0.00
RAM					1	0.00	–
Informal votes		338			143		
Total valid votes		34,687			35,052		
National hold	Majority	6,664	19.21	+12.69			

=== 2005 election ===
2005 general election: Invercargill
Notes:	Blue background denotes the winner of the electorate vote. Pink background denotes a candidate elected from their party list. Yellow background denotes an electorate win by a list member, or other incumbent. A ✓ or ✗ denotes status of any incumbent, win or lose respectively.						
Party	Candidate	Votes	%	±%	Party votes	%	±%
National	Eric Roy	15,570	49.51		12,559	39.49	
Labour	Wayne Harpur	13,518	42.98		14,369	45.18	
Green	Craig Carson	906	2.88		980	3.08	
United Future	Ralph Kennard	453	1.4		1,024	3.22	
ACT	Ian Beker	358	1.14		365	1.15	
Progressive	Heka Taefu	231	0.73		388	1.22	
Democrats	Bruce Stirling	187	0.59		63	0.20	
Māori Party	Gina Haremate-Crawford	163	0.52		106	0.33	
Direct Democracy	Craig Guy	65	0.21		11	0.03	
NZ First					1,530	4.81	
Destiny					188	0.59	
Legalise Cannabis					96	0.30	
Christian Heritage					56	0.19	
Alliance					22	0.07	
One NZ					13	0.04	
Family Rights					11	0.03	
Libertarianz					10	0.03	
99 MP					9	0.03	
RONZ					5	0.02	
Informal votes		316			111		
Total valid votes		31,451			31,805		
National gain from Labour	Majority	2,052	6.52				

=== 2002 election ===
2002 general election: Invercargill
Notes:	Blue background denotes the winner of the electorate vote. Pink background denotes a candidate elected from their party list. Yellow background denotes an electorate win by a list member, or other incumbent. A ✓ or ✗ denotes status of any incumbent, win or lose respectively.						
Party	Candidate	Votes	%	±%	Party votes	%	±%
Labour	✓ Mark Peck	14,548	48.77	−8.31	14,089	46.73	+1.80
National	Eric Roy	11,756	39.41	+7.71	8,021	26.60	−3.32
Progressive	Stephnie de Ruyter	1,006	3.37	−1.61 (Note: Percentage change calculated as a candidate for the Alliance Party in the 1999 election)	760	2.52	
Green	Craig Carson	963	3.23	+1.04	1,298	4.30	+1.22
United Future	Vince Smith	806	2.70		1,851	6.14	
ACT	Peter Phiskie	313	1.05		1,073	3.56	+0.23
Christian Heritage	Mervyn Lemuel Clayton	235	0.79		301	1.00	−1.63
Alliance	Anna McMartin	202	0.68		241	0.80	−9.11
NZ First					1,838	6.10	+3.33
ORNZ					444	1.47	
Legalise Cannabis					219	0.73	−0.45
One NZ					14	0.05	+0.01
Mana Māori					2	0.01	−0.02
NMP					1	0.00	0.00
Informal votes		296			108		
Total valid votes		29,829			30,152		
Labour hold	Majority	2,792	9.36	−16.02			

=== 1999 election ===
1999 general election: Invercargill
Notes:	Blue background denotes the winner of the electorate vote. Pink background denotes a candidate elected from their party list. Yellow background denotes an electorate win by a list member, or other incumbent. A ✓ or ✗ denotes status of any incumbent, win or lose respectively.						
Party	Candidate	Votes	%	±%	Party votes	%	±%
Labour	✓ Mark Peck	17,970	57.08	+8.25	14,196	44.93	+11.69
National	Eric Roy	9,980	31.70	−3.69	9,453	29.92	−4.34
Alliance	Stephnie de Ruyter	1,567	4.98		3,132	9.91	+0.15
Green	Craig William Carson	689	2.19		974	3.08	
Christian Heritage	Russell Zwies	536	1.70		832	2.63	
NZ First	Allan Wise	488	1.55		875	2.77	−9.12
ACT	Matt McInnes	251	0.80		1,051	3.33	+0.41
Legalise Cannabis					372	1.18	−0.47
Christian Democrats					245	0.78	
South Island					157	0.50	
Libertarianz					92	0.29	+0.26
United NZ					86	0.27	−0.21
Animals First					44	0.14	−0.01
McGillicuddy Serious					44	0.14	−0.19
Natural Law					13	0.04	−0.12
One NZ					13	0.04	
Mana Māori					8	0.03	+0.02
The People's Choice					5	0.02	
Mauri Pacific					2	0.01	
Freedom Movement					1	0.00	
NMP					0	0.00	
Republican					0	0.00	
Informal votes		431			317		
Total valid votes		31,481			31,595		
Labour hold	Majority	7,991	25.38	+11.94			

=== 1996 election ===
1996 general election: Invercargill
Notes:	Blue background denotes the winner of the electorate vote. Pink background denotes a candidate elected from their party list. Yellow background denotes an electorate win by a list member, or other incumbent. A ✓ or ✗ denotes status of any incumbent, win or lose respectively.						
Party	Candidate	Votes	%	±%	Party votes	%	±%
Labour	✓ Mark Peck	15,383	48.83		10,502	33.24	
National	✗ Eric Roy	11,148	35.39		10,825	34.26	
NZ First	Owen Horton	2,302	7.31		3,757	11.89	
Alliance	Bruce Stirling	1,536	4.88		3,083	9.76	
ACT	Louis Crimp	441	1.40		921	2.92	
Independent	Philip Jones	294	0.93				
McGillicuddy Serious	Anthony Hobbs	200	0.63		105	0.33	
United NZ	Stuart Jordan	111	0.35		153	0.48	
Natural Law	Jacque Hughes	87	0.28		49	0.16	
Christian Coalition					1,495	4.73	
Legalise Cannabis					521	1.65	
Progressive Green					60	0.19	
Animals First					47	0.15	
Green Society					26	0.08	
Conservatives					14	0.04	
Superannuitants & Youth					11	0.03	
Libertarianz					8	0.03	
Advance New Zealand					6	0.02	
Mana Māori					4	0.01	
Te Tawharau					4	0.01	
Asia Pacific United					2	0.01	
Ethnic Minority Party					1	0.00	
Informal votes		207			115		
Total valid votes		31,502			31,594		
Labour hold	Majority	4,235	13.44				

=== 1993 election ===
1993 general election: Invercargill
Party	Candidate	Votes	%	±%
Labour	Mark Peck	8,477	43.66	
National	Rob Munro	7,303	37.61	−9.05
Alliance	Cecily Treweek	2,250	11.58	+8.72
Independent	Philip Jones	702	3.61	
NZ First	K Kawe	393	2.02	
Christian Heritage	H Macann	242	1.24	
Natural Law	Rhonda-Lisa Comins	48	0.24	
Majority		1,174	6.04	
Turnout		19,415	84.29	+0.02
Registered electors		23,033		

=== 1990 election ===
1990 general election: Invercargill
Party	Candidate	Votes	%	±%
National	Rob Munro	10,727	46.66	−2.06
Labour	Barry Rait	6,590	28.66	
NewLabour	J Moore	746	3.24	
Democrats	Cecily Treweek	659	2.86	−5.82
Social Credit	H M Thompson	334	1.45	
Legalise Marijuana	K Dreaver	319	1.38	
Majority		4,137	17.99	+15.34
Turnout		19,375	84.27	−6.17
Registered electors		22,989		

=== 1987 election ===
1987 general election: Invercargill
Party	Candidate	Votes	%	±%
National	Rob Munro	10,115	48.72	
Labour	Dougal Soper	9,563	46.06	+5.29
Democrats	Cecily Treweek	1,803	8.68	
Majority		552	2.65	
Turnout		20,761	90.44	−3.36
Registered electors		22,955		

=== 1984 election ===
1984 general election: Invercargill
Party	Candidate	Votes	%	±%
National	Norman Jones	9,805	46.89	+1.26
Labour	Dougal Soper	8,526	40.77	+2.91
NZ Party	Maurice Coughlan	1,721	8.23	
Social Credit	Joe Radich	801	3.83	−12.67
Independent	G J Gilbert	56	0.26	
Majority		1,279	6.11	+1.65
Turnout		20,909	93.80	+2.58
Registered electors		22,291		

=== 1981 election ===
1981 general election: Invercargill
Party	Candidate	Votes	%	±%
National	Norman Jones	9,350	45.63	−2.33
Labour	Dougal Soper	7,758	37.86	
Social Credit	Joe Radich	3,382	16.50	+2.71
Majority		1,592	7.76	+6.49
Turnout		20,490	91.22	+16.45
Registered electors		22,460		

=== 1978 election ===
1978 general election: Invercargill
Party	Candidate	Votes	%	±%
National	Norman Jones	8,666	43.30	−9.28
Labour	Aubrey Begg	8,410	42.02	
Social Credit	Joe Radich	2,760	13.79	
Values	R J Thomson	175	0.87	
Majority		256	1.27	−12.44
Turnout		20,011	74.77	−11.06
Registered electors		26,762		

=== 1975 election ===
1975 general election: Invercargill
Party	Candidate	Votes	%	±%
National	Norman Jones	9,713	52.58	
Labour	J. B. Munro	7,180	38.87	−9.81
Social Credit	N G Green	1,045	5.65	
Values	Malcolm Blair	533	2.88	
Majority		2,533	13.71	
Turnout		18,471	85.83	−6.33
Registered electors		21,518		

=== 1972 election ===
1972 general election: Invercargill
Party	Candidate	Votes	%	±%
Labour	J. B. Munro	8,125	48.68	
National	John Chewings	7,360	44.09	−3.74
Social Credit	M L Patterson	855	5.12	
Independent Labour	W F Manson	251	1.50	
Liberal Reform	H W I Le Page	60	0.35	
New Democratic	J Murphy	39	0.23	
Majority		765	4.58	
Turnout		16,690	92.16	+3.77
Registered electors		18,108		

=== 1969 election ===
1969 general election: Invercargill
Party	Candidate	Votes	%	±%
National	John Chewings	7,699	47.83	
Labour	Trevor Young	6,668	41.42	
Social Credit	D L Steele	1,728	10.73	+6.15
Majority		1,031	6.40	
Turnout		16,095	88.39	+2.78
Registered electors		18,209		

=== 1966 election ===
1966 general election: Invercargill
Party	Candidate	Votes	%	±%
National	Ralph Hanan	7,626	49.30	−0.87
Labour	Noel Valentine	5,230	33.81	
Social Credit	D L Steele	2,611	16.88	+11.69
Majority		2,396	15.49	+3.18
Turnout		15,467	85.61	−4.40
Registered electors		18,066		

=== 1963 election ===
1963 general election: Invercargill
Party	Candidate	Votes	%	±%
National	Ralph Hanan	7,879	50.17	−4.18
Labour	Oliver James Henderson	5,945	37.85	−3.62
Liberal	Ronald MacGregor Hutton-Potts	1,064	6.77	
Social Credit	D L Steele	815	5.19	+1.02
Majority		1,934	12.31	+0.56
Turnout		15,703	90.01	+0.74
Registered electors		17,445		

=== 1960 election ===
1960 general election: Invercargill
Party	Candidate	Votes	%	±%
National	Ralph Hanan	8,128	54.35	+4.34
Labour	Oliver James Henderson	6,202	41.47	
Social Credit	D L Steele	624	4.17	
Majority		1,926	12.87	+8.39
Turnout		14,954	89.27	−3.75
Registered electors		16,751		

=== 1957 election ===
1957 general election: Invercargill
Party	Candidate	Votes	%	±%
National	Ralph Hanan	7,577	50.01	+6.25
Labour	Thomas Francis Doyle	6,898	45.53	
Social Credit	Leslie G. Russell	673	4.44	−14.87
Majority		679	4.48	−2.37
Turnout		15,148	93.02	+2.65
Registered electors		16,284		

=== 1954 election ===
1954 general election: Invercargill
Party	Candidate	Votes	%	±%
National	Ralph Hanan	6,020	43.76	−13.66
Labour	William Denham	5,077	36.91	
Social Credit	Leslie G. Russell	2,657	19.31	
Majority		943	6.85	−8.00
Turnout		13,754	90.37	+0.69
Registered electors		15,218		

=== 1951 election ===
1951 General election: Invercargill
Party	Candidate	Votes	%	±%
National	Ralph Hanan	8,208	57.42	+3.47
Labour	F G Spurdle	6,085	42.57	
Majority		2,123	14.85	+6.94
Turnout		14,293	89.68	−5.27
Registered electors		15,937		

=== 1949 election ===
1949 general election: Invercargill
Party	Candidate	Votes	%	±%
National	Ralph Hanan	7,897	53.95	+3.18
Labour	William Denham	6,738	46.04	−3.18
Majority		1,159	7.91	+6.36
Turnout		14,635	94.95	+0.86
Registered electors		15,412		

=== 1946 election ===
1946 general election: Invercargill
Party	Candidate	Votes	%	±%
National	Ralph Hanan	7,315	50.77	
Labour	William Denham	7,091	49.22	−2.12
Majority		224	1.55	
Turnout		14,406	94.09	−3.34
Registered electors		15,310		

=== 1943 election ===
1943 general election: Invercargill
Party	Candidate	Votes	%	±%
Labour	William Denham	7,442	51.34	−5.42
National	William Bell	6,435	44.40	
Democratic Labour	L. Assheton Harbord	523	3.60	
Informal votes		113	0.77	+0.40
Majority		1,007	6.94	−8.17
Turnout		14,493	97.43	+1.47
Registered electors		14,874		

=== 1938 election ===
1938 general election: Invercargill
Party	Candidate	Votes	%	±%
Labour	William Denham	8,094	56.76	+26.21
National	Fred Hall-Jones	5,938	41.64	
Independent	George Edward Thompson Dorman	174	1.22	
Informal votes		54	0.37	−0.29
Majority		2,156	15.11	+12.54
Turnout		14,260	95.96	+1.28
Registered electors		14,860		

=== 1935 election ===
1935 general election: Invercargill
Party	Candidate	Votes	%	±%
Labour	William Denham	4,241	31.55	+4.98
Democrat	Gordon Reed	3,895	28.98	
Reform	John Miller	2,708	20.15	
Independent Liberal	William McChesney	2,595	19.30	−15.30
Informal votes		90	0.66	0.35
Majority		346	2.57	
Turnout		13,439	94.68	+7.16
Registered electors		14,194		

=== 1931 election ===
1931 general election: Invercargill
Party	Candidate	Votes	%	±%
Independent	James Hargest	4,652	38.84	−8.25
United	William McChesney	4,144	34.60	
Labour	William Denham	3,182	26.57	
Majority		508	4.24	−1.58
Informal votes		37	0.31	+0.05
Turnout		12,015	87.52	+8.02
Registered electors		13,729		

=== 1930 by-election ===
1930 Invercargill by-election
Party	Candidate	Votes	%	±%
United	Vincent Ward	5,194	52.91	
Reform	James Hargest	4,623	47.09	
Majority		571	5.82	
Informal votes		25	0.25	−0.51
Turnout		9,842	79.50	−13.62
Registered electors		12,380		

=== 1928 election ===
1928 general election: Invercargill
Party	Candidate	Votes	%	±%
United	Joseph Ward	7,309	63.89	+16.98
Reform	Morell Macalister	4,131	36.11	
Majority		3,178	27.78	+26.27
Informal votes		88	0.76	+0.25
Turnout		11,528	93.12	−0.61
Registered electors		12,380		

=== 1925 election ===
1925 general election: Invercargill
Party	Candidate	Votes	%	±%
Liberal	Joseph Ward	4,957	46.91	
Reform	James Hargest	4,798	45.41	
Labour	Pat Hickey	811	7.68	
Majority		159	1.50	−9.22
Informal votes		55	0.52	−0.34
Turnout		10,621	93.73	+3.44
Registered electors		11,332		

=== 1899 election ===
1899 general election: Invercargill
Party	Candidate	Votes	%	±%
Liberal	Josiah Hanan	2,451	52.82	
Liberal–Labour	James Whyte Kelly	2,189	47.18	−2.07
Majority		262	5.65	−7.08
Turnout		4,640	79.94	+1.02
Registered electors		5,804		

=== 1896 election ===
1896 general election: Invercargill
Party	Candidate	Votes	%	±%
Liberal–Labour	James Whyte Kelly	2,237	49.25	−17.98
Liberal	John Sinclair	1,659	36.53	
Conservative	William Benjamin Scandrett	646	14.22	
Majority		578	12.73	−21.74
Turnout		4,542	78.92	+0.71
Registered electors		5,755		

=== 1893 election ===
1893 general election: Invercargill
Party	Candidate	Votes	%	±%
Liberal–Labour	James Whyte Kelly	2,423	67.23	+25.48
Independent	Joseph Hatch	1,181	32.77	
Majority		1,242	34.46	+26.61
Turnout		3,604	78.21	+4.48
Registered electors		4,608		

=== 1890 election ===
1890 general election: Invercargill
Party	Candidate	Votes	%	±%
Liberal–Labour	James Whyte Kelly	633	41.75	
Conservative	James Walker Bain	517	34.10	
Liberal	Henry Feldwick	366	24.15	
Majority		116	7.65	
Turnout		1,516	73.73	
Registered electors		2,056		

=== 1878 by-election ===
1878 Invercargill by-election
Party	Candidate	Votes	%	±%
Independent	Henry Feldwick	230	51.22	+51.22
Independent	James Walker Bain	219	48.78	+48.78
Majority		11	2.45	
Turnout		449		

=== 1875 election ===
1875 general election: Invercargill
Party	Candidate	Votes	%	±%
Independent	George Lumsden	180	53.10	+53.10
Independent	John Cuthbertson	159	46.90	−5.58
Majority		21	6.19	
Turnout		339		

=== 1873 by-election ===
1873 Invercargill by-election
Party	Candidate	Votes	%	±%
Independent	John Cuthbertson	159	52.48	
Independent	William Wood	144	47.52	
Majority		15	4.95	
Turnout		303		

=== 1871 election ===
1871 general election: Invercargill
Party	Candidate	Votes	%	±%
Independent	William Henderson Calder	142	61.21	+61.21
Independent	George Lumsden	90	38.79	+38.79
Majority		52	22.41	
Turnout		232		

=== 1866 election ===
1866 general election: Invercargill
Party	Candidate	Votes	%	±%
Independent	William Wood	75	50.67	
Independent	Theophilus Heale	73	49.32	
Majority		2	1.35	
Turnout		148		
