= Rex Austin =

New Zealand politician (1931–2022)

Rex Austin MBE
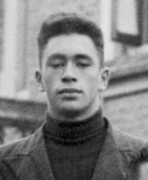
- Austin in 1950

Member of the New Zealand Parliament for Awarua
- In office 1975–1987
- Preceded by: Aubrey Begg
- Succeeded by: Jeff Grant

Personal details
- Born: William Rex Austin; 23 May 1931 Riverton, New Zealand
- Died: 23 June 2022 (aged 91) Invercargill, New Zealand
- Party: National
- Spouse: Miriam Helen Brumpton (m. 1958; died 2007)
- Relations: Butler Te Koeti (great-uncle)
- Children: 4
- Education: Lincoln College

William Rex Austin MBE (23 May 1931 – 23 June 2022) was a New Zealand politician of the National Party.

== Biography ==
New Zealand Parliament
| Years | Term | Electorate | Party |
|---|---|---|---|
| 1975–1978 | 38th | Awarua | National |
| 1978–1981 | 39th | Awarua | National |
| 1981–1984 | 40th | Awarua | National |
| 1984–1987 | 41st | Awarua | National |

Austin was born in Riverton, Southland, in 1931. Of Māori descent, he affiliated to Ngāi Tahu, Waitaha and Kāti Māmoe. He received his education at Southland Technical College and Lincoln College; at the latter institution, he obtained a diploma in agriculture. In 1958, he married Miriam Helen Brumpton, with whom he had four sons.

Austin farmed at Colac Bay in Southland and lived in Riverton. From 1971, he was a member of the Southland Hospital Board.

In the 1975 election he was elected to Parliament as the National Party MP for Awarua, which he represented until 1987.

Austin and Ben Couch were the second and third Māori (after Sir James Carroll) to win a general electorate, as opposed to one of the Māori electorates.

Austin died in Invercargill on 23 June 2022, at the age of 91.

== Honours ==
In 1977, Austin was awarded the Queen Elizabeth II Silver Jubilee Medal, and in 1990 the New Zealand 1990 Commemoration Medal. In the 1994 New Year Honours, he was appointed a Member of the Order of the British Empire, for services to the community.

New Zealand Parliament
| Preceded by Aubrey Begg | Member of Parliament for Awarua; 1975–1987 | Succeeded by Jeff Grant |
