= Rob Munro (politician) =

New Zealand politician (born 1946)

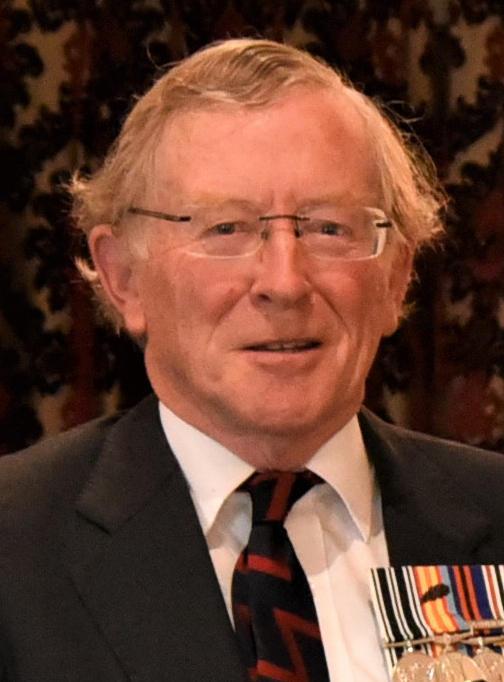
- Munro in 2019

Member of the New Zealand Parliament for Invercargill
- In office 1987–1993
- Preceded by: Norman Jones
- Succeeded by: Mark Peck

Personal details
- Born: Robert John Sutherland Munro; 2 April 1946 (age 80) Dunedin, New Zealand
- Party: National
- Profession: Barrister and solicitor

Military service
- Allegiance: New Zealand
- Branch/service: New Zealand Army
- Years of service: 1964–?
- Rank: Lieutenant colonel
- Unit: Royal New Zealand Corps of Signals and Royal New Zealand Artillery
- Battles/wars: Vietnam War

Robert John Sutherland Munro (born 2 April 1946) is a former New Zealand politician of the National Party, serving as Member of Parliament for Invercargill from 1987 to 1993.

== Early life ==
Munro was born in Dunedin on 2 April 1946.

== Military service ==
Aged 17, Munro enlisted in the New Zealand Army in January 1964. On 13 December 1967, he graduated from the Royal Military College.

In November 1970 with the rank of captain, Munro was posted to General Staff (Intelligence) Section Headquarters, 1st Australian Task Force, at Nui Dat in Vietnam. There he was responsible for compiling the enemy order-of-battle, requiring him to analyse the organisation and capability of enemy units. In June 1971, he was given the duties of General Staff Officer Grade Three (Intelligence), in which role he received, prepared and distributed daily intelligence reports, and briefed interrogation teams, aerial reconnaissance pilots, unit commanders and visitors. For his diligent and dedicated performance of those duties, he was mentioned in despatches in March 1972.

After returning to New Zealand, Munro served at Defence Headquarters, commanded 161 Battery RNZA in Papakura and later Waiouru Training Depot. He reached the rank of lieutenant colonel. After discharge from the NZ Army he worked in Wellington as a lawyer.

In 2019, Munro was presented his mention in despatch award by the governor-general, Dame Patsy Reddy, in a ceremony at Government House, Wellington.

== Member of Parliament ==
New Zealand Parliament
Years	Term	Electorate	Party
1987–1990	42nd	Invercargill	National
1990–1993	43rd	Invercargill	National

Munro represented the Invercargill electorate in Parliament from 1987, when he replaced Norman Jones to 1993, when he was defeated by Mark Peck.

New Zealand Parliament
Preceded by Norman Jones	Member of Parliament for Invercargill; 1987–1993	Succeeded by Mark Peck
