= Henry Feldwick =

New Zealand politician

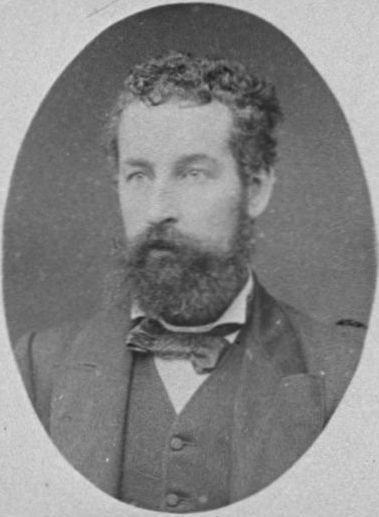
Henry Feldwick in 1882

New Zealand Parliament
Years	Term	Electorate	Party
1878–1879	6th	Invercargill	Independent
1881–1884	8th	Invercargill	Independent
1887–1890	10th	Invercargill	Independent

Henry Feldwick (1844 – 3 August 1908) was a 19th-century member of parliament from the Southland region of New Zealand.

He represented the Invercargill electorate in Parliament from 1878 to 1879, from 1881 to 1884 and from 1887 to 1890. He was defeated in 1879 by James Bain, in 1884 by Joseph Hatch, and in 1890 by James Kelly.

He was a member of the New Zealand Legislative Council from 1892 to 3 August 1908, when he died.

== Notes ==
New Zealand Parliament
Preceded by George Lumsden	Member of Parliament for Invercargill; 1878–1879; 1881–1884; 1887–1890	Succeeded by James Walker Bain
Preceded by James Walker Bain	Member of Parliament for Invercargill; 1878–1879; 1881–1884; 1887–1890	Succeeded by Joseph Hatch
Preceded by Joseph Hatch	Member of Parliament for Invercargill; 1878–1879; 1881–1884; 1887–1890	Succeeded by James Whyte Kelly
