= J. B. Munro =

New Zealand politician (1936–2018)

J. B. Munro QSO JP
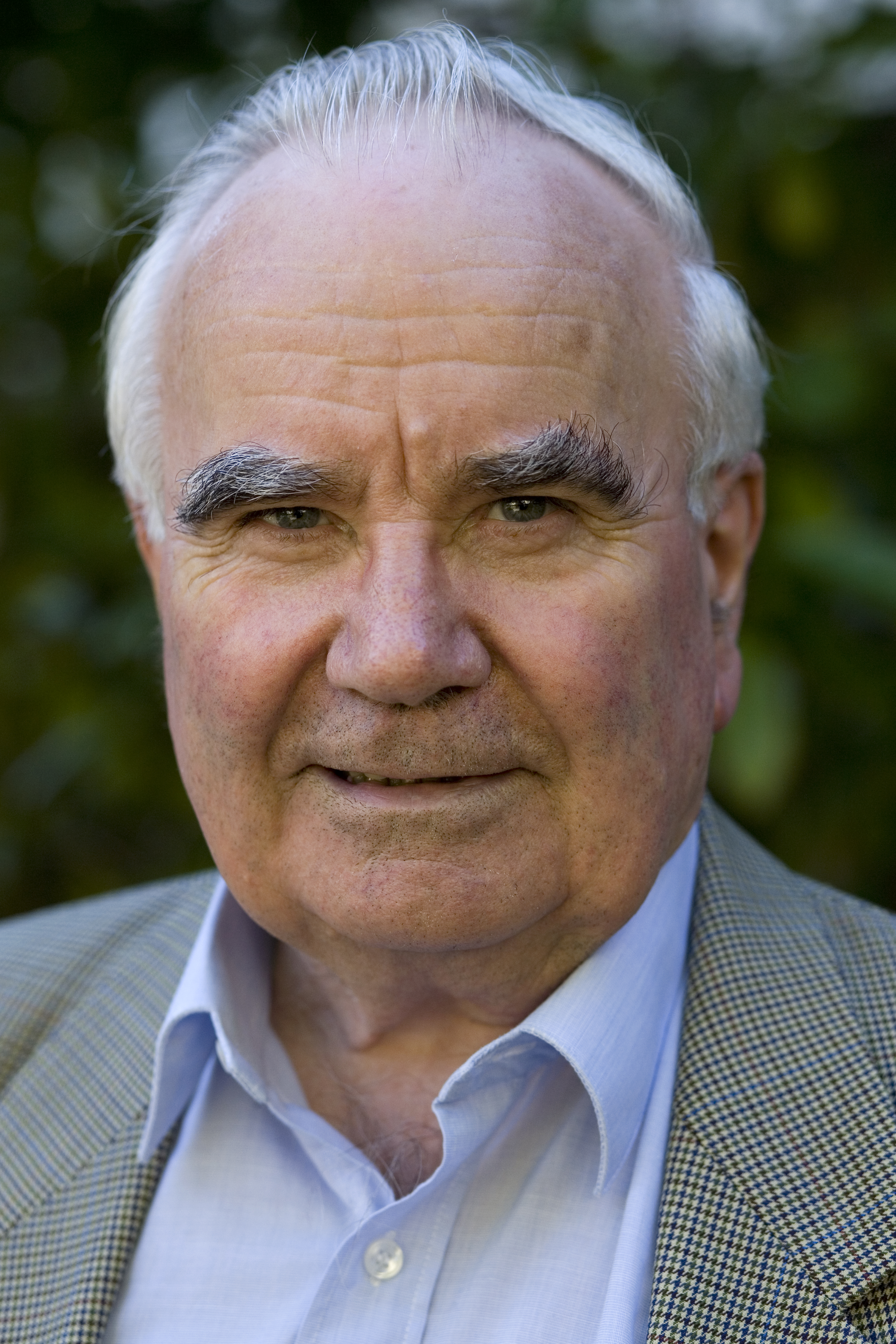
- J.B. Munro

Member of the New Zealand Parliament for Invercargill
- In office 25 November 1972 – 29 November 1975
- Preceded by: John Chewings
- Succeeded by: Norman Jones

Personal details
- Born: John Baldwin; 15 August 1936 Gore, New Zealand
- Died: 4 June 2018 (aged 81) Christchurch, New Zealand
- Party: Labour
- Other political affiliations: National
- Spouse: Valmai Marion Sharfe (m. 1962)
- Relations: Burt Munro (brother)
- Children: 2

John Baldwin Munro QSO JP (né John Baldwin, 15 August 1936 – 4 June 2018), better known as J. B. Munro, was a New Zealand politician of the Labour Party. He was also a notable disability advocate.

== Early life and education ==
Born in Gore in 1936, Munro's birth name was John Baldwin. Having had poliomyelitis as a baby, he was a state ward and raised as a foster child. At the age of nine he was adopted by his foster parents, the Munro family in Invercargill, and his name was changed to John Baldwin Munro. His adoptive father was William Munro and his adoptive brother was Burt Munro, a New Zealand motorcycle racer who was the subject of The World's Fastest Indian.

Munro was educated at St George Primary (now Fernworth Primary), Tweedsmuir Junior High, and Southland Boys' High School.

== Career ==
Munro was a clerk for the Vacuum Oil Company from 1954 to 1957. He was secretary for the YMCA in Invercargill, Australia, and Dunedin between 1958 and 1968.

He was the Southland administrator for IHC New Zealand from 1968 to 1973. He was the chairman for the Paraplegic Trust Appeal in 1973 and set up the Fundraising Institute of New Zealand. For seven years, he chaired the New Zealand Federation of Voluntary Welfare agencies.

New Zealand Parliament
Years	Term	Electorate	Party
1972–1975	37th	Invercargill	Labour

Munro was the Southland regional chairman of the Commonwealth Games Appeal. He was also a member of the Invercargill City Council from 1971 to 1974.

He represented the Invercargill electorate in Parliament from 1972 to 1975, when he was defeated by Norman Jones. Previously he had been a member of the National Party. In Parliament, Munro was notable for advocating the passage of the Disabled Persons' Community Welfare Act. It was passed during the last week of Parliament before the Labour Party was defeated in the 1975 general election, giving disabled people community services as of right for the first time. Munro worked as a Labour Party fund-raiser during the general election. After losing his parliamentary seat Munro was appointed as Labour's fundraising director. He initiated a new donation scheme which was very successful, bringing in over $500,000 by 1979. After Jones won the Invercargill seat he resigned from the city council after being elected to parliament, prompting a by-election. Munro won a seat on the council at an April 1976 by-election (his second spell on the council).

In October 1977, Munro moved to Wellington following his parliamentary career. He remained an active member of the Labour Party and became secretary of the party's Eastern Hutt electorate committee. In 1983 he challenged incumbent MP for Eastern Hutt Trevor Young for the nomination. Both men were friends but differed on social policies and local members coalesced in two groups; with liberal members behind Munro while those more conservative backed Young. Prior to the selection meeting the two had agreed to avoid ill-feeling and retain their productive working relationship. The agreement was reaffirmed after Young won the vote and was given a standing ovation by all 250 members in attendance. Munro stood as a Labour Party candidate for the Lower Hutt City Council at the 1986 local elections but was unsuccessful.

He was appointed national secretary of IHC. Munro was vice-chairman of the 1981 telethon, which raised NZ$6 million and which funded the introduction of teletext in New Zealand. He retired from IHC in 1998 as chief executive officer.

== Awards and honours ==
On his retirement from IHC, Munro was made a life member, and in 2014 was inducted into the Attitude Hall of Fame. In the 1990 New Year Honours, he was appointed a Companion of the Queen's Service Order for public services.

== Personal life ==
On 6 October 1962, Munro married Valmai "Val" Sharfe, the daughter of Walter Sharfe. They had one son and one daughter. Hilary Stace's biography of Munro was completed in 2019.

He died in Christchurch on 4 June 2018, aged 81.

== Notes ==
New Zealand Parliament
Preceded by John Chewings	Member of Parliament for Invercargill; 1972–1975	Succeeded by Norman Jones
