= Eric Roy (politician) =

New Zealand politician

Eric Roy QSO JP
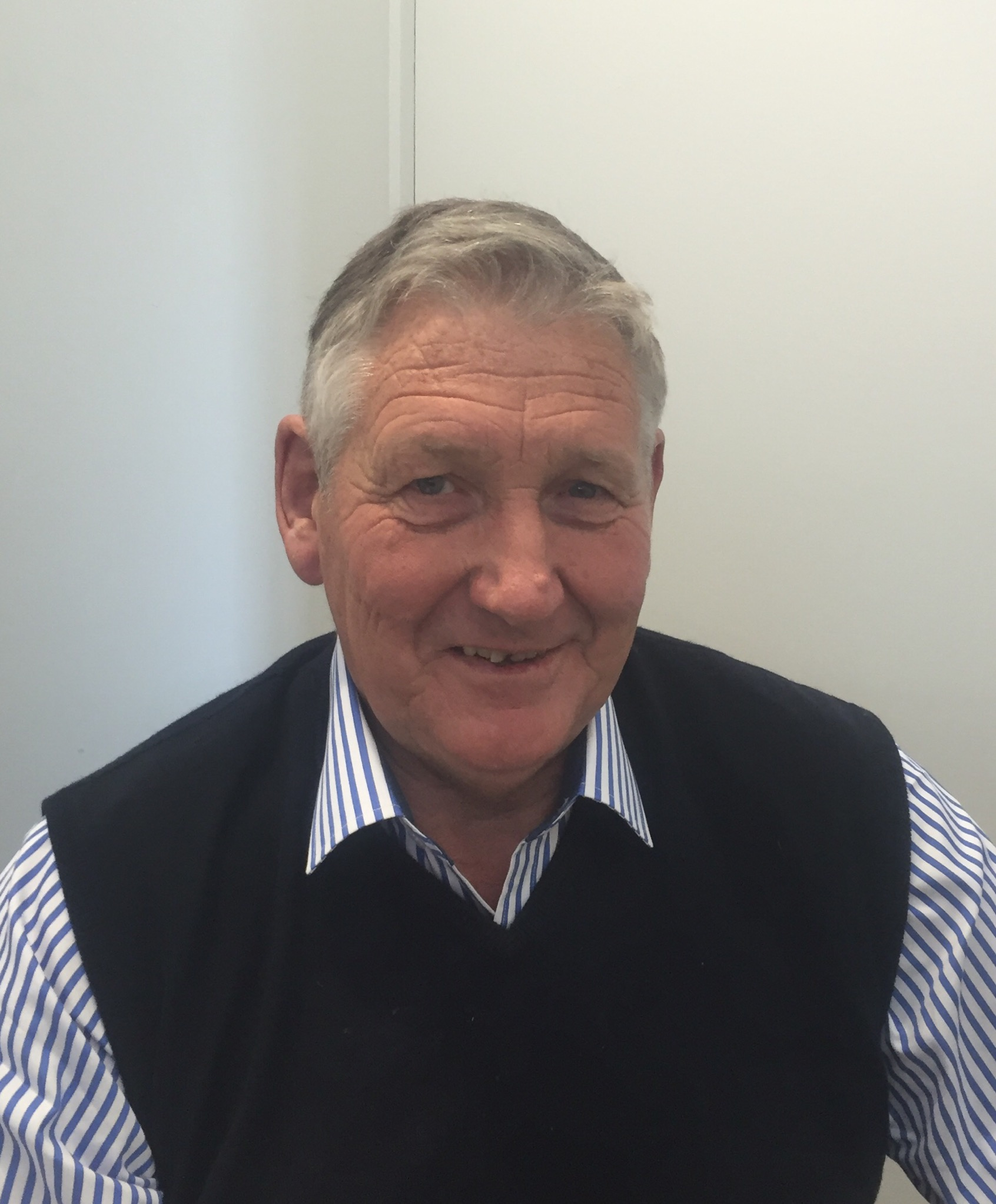
- Roy in 2018

Member of the New Zealand Parliament for Invercargill
- In office 2005–2014
- Preceded by: Mark Peck
- Succeeded by: Sarah Dowie

Member of the New Zealand Parliament for the National Party List
- In office 1996–2002

Member of the New Zealand Parliament for Awarua
- In office 1993–1996
- Preceded by: Jeff Grant
- Succeeded by: Constituency abolished

Personal details
- Born: Eric Wilbur Roy; 27 June 1948 (age 78) Gore, New Zealand
- Party: National

Eric Wilbur Roy (born 27 June 1948) is a New Zealand politician. He was a Member of Parliament (MP) for the National Party. He was first elected in 1993 and served, with one three-year break, until 2014.

== Early years ==
Roy was born in Gore in 1948. Before entering politics, he was a farmer and company director, as well as being involved with Federated Farmers. He is a Justice of the Peace.

== Member of Parliament ==
New Zealand Parliament
Years	Term	Electorate	List	Party
1993–1996	44th	Awarua		National
1996–1999	45th	List	23	National
1999–2002	46th	List	19	National
2005–2008	48th	Invercargill	37	National
2008–2011	49th	Invercargill	28	National
2011–2014	50th	Invercargill	25	National

He first entered Parliament in the 1993 election as MP for the Awarua electorate. For the 1996 election, Awarua was merged into Invercargill and he was beaten by Labour's Mark Peck, but he remained in Parliament through being elected through the party list. He unsuccessfully contested the Invercargill electorate in the 1999 election but remained a list MP. Roy served as Assistant Speaker of the House from 1998 to 2002, initially under National's Doug Kidd and then under Labour's Jonathan Hunt.

Roy was not elected in the 2002 election; he was defeated by Labour's Mark Peck in Invercargill and, at 26, was not placed high enough on the National Party list to be re-elected.

In 2005, he contested the Invercargill electorate for the National Party and was re-elected to Parliament after winning the bellwether seat. He increased his majority in the 2008 election, was re-elected in 2011 election, and served as the Deputy Speaker of the House.

Roy announced in January 2014 that he would retire at the 2014 election.

== After parliament ==
Roy was appointed a Companion of the Queen's Service Order, for services as a Member of Parliament, in the 2015 New Year Honours.

On 15 June 2015, it was announced that Roy had been appointed to the board of Landcorp.

Roy was elected to the Southland Regional Council in 2016. He attempted to become chairman and deputy chairman but lost both votes 5–7.

In September 2018, Roy announced that his cattle were being tested for the cattle disease Mycoplasma bovis. In 2018, it was reported that Roy nominated Yikun Zhang, a businessman and political donor with connections to the Chinese Communist Party, for the New Zealand Order of Merit.

New Zealand Parliament
Preceded by Jeff Grant	Member of Parliament for Awarua; 1993–1996	Constituency abolished
Preceded by Mark Peck	Member of Parliament for Invercargill; 2005–2014	Succeeded by Sarah Dowie
