= IHC New Zealand =

IHC New Zealand is a New Zealand organisation providing support and care for people of all ages with intellectual disabilities. It began as the Society for Intellectually Handicapped Children, hence the IHC acronym. IHC advocates for the rights, inclusion and welfare of all people with an intellectual disability and supports them to live satisfying lives in the community. There are 13,000 young families who struggle with the pressures of raising a child with an intellectual disability, and 29,000 adults with an intellectual disability across New Zealand. IHC is New Zealand's largest provider of services to people with intellectual disabilities and their families, supporting more than 6000 people. Its history reaches back over 70 years to a group of families who set up an association to lobby for a better deal for their children.

IHC believes people with an intellectual disability have the right:

- to be treated with respect and dignity
- to have a say in their own lives
- to live, learn, work and enjoy life and part of the community
- to have support that meets their goals and aspirations
- to be part of a family.

IHC supports people with an intellectual disability by:

- advocating for their rights
- providing housing and work options
- supporting families
- services
- membership

== Idea Services ==
Idea Services is the company owned by IHC to provide services to disabled people. Idea Services has frequently appeared before the Employment Relations Authority in cases involving staff and former staff.

== Regional histories ==
- Whanganui IHC, Mr and Mrs Austin in support of their daughter Lorraine were early workers for the Whanganui Region IHC.
- Alma Gardens in Gonville and Idea Services became important places to IHC.
- The South Auckland branch (Bay of Plenty, Waikato, King Country) of the Intellectually Handicapped Child and Parents Association (IHCPA) was established by Lorna Ina Ranby, who received an MBE for her work.

== Notable people ==
- J. B. Munro From 1977 to 1998, IHC New Zealand was being led by J. B. Munro, first as National Secretary and when he retired, he was chief executive officer.
- Robert Martin
- Lorna Ina Ranby who received an MBE for her work including establishing what became the Waikato, Bay of Plenty and King Country branches of the IHC. New Zealand's first social housing for people with intellectual disabilities was names after her son in honour of her work.
