= John Chewings =

New Zealand politician

New Zealand Parliament
Years	Term	Electorate	Party
1969–1972	36th	Invercargill	National

John Guy Chewings (14 April 1920 – 12 September 1994) was a New Zealand politician of the National Party.

== Biography ==
Chewings was born in 1920 at Invercargill. He received his education at Waitaki Boys' High School. During World War II, he was a flying instructor for the Royal New Zealand Air Force. He later took up farming in Mossburn.

Chewings was selected on 17 September 1969 as the National Party candidate for the Invercargill electorate in the 1969 election, following the death of Ralph Hanan in July. He represented Invercargill until 1972, when he was defeated. He was one of four National Party incumbents from Otago and Southland who lost their normally blue electorate to the Labour challenger over the proposed raising of the lake levels of lakes Manapouri and Te Anau, which was opposed by the Save Manapouri campaign. Labour's election manifesto was for the lakes to remain at their natural levels.

The year after his defeat, he moved to Whangārei. In 1990, Chewings was awarded the New Zealand 1990 Commemoration Medal.

== Notes ==
New Zealand Parliament
Preceded by Ralph Hanan	Member of Parliament for Invercargill; 1969–1972	Succeeded by J. B. Munro
