= Mark Peck =

New Zealand politician

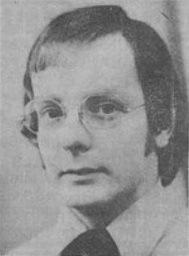
- Peck in 1977

Member of the New Zealand Parliament for Invercargill
- In office 6 November 1993 – 17 September 2005
- Preceded by: Rob Munro
- Succeeded by: Eric Roy

Personal details
- Born: 16 July 1953 (age 73) Hamilton, Ohio, U.S.
- Party: Labour
- Spouse: Margaret
- Children: 3
- Occupation: Politician

Mark Everett Peck (born 16 July 1953) is a New Zealand politician and a member of the Labour Party. From 2013 to 2016, he was a Wellington City Councillor, and was MP for Invercargill from 1993 to 2005.

== Early life and career ==
Peck was born in 1953 in the town of Hamilton, Ohio, United States, and arrived in New Zealand in 1963. His father, Reverend Robert Logan Peck, was an Anglican priest, journalist and politician, and stimulated Mark's interest in politics at an early age, leading him to seek positions in the Labour-influenced trade unions. In 1969 he became a New Zealand citizen. He was educated at Wellington College and then attended both University of Canterbury and Christchurch College of Education. He became President of the University of Canterbury Students' Association and from 1975 to 1976 he was General Secretary of the National Student Teachers' Association.

He worked several jobs prior to entering politics including as a part-time tutor, retailer, factory worker and supermarket department manager. In 1977 he became a union official with the Hospital and Hotel Workers' Union (later amalgamated into the Service Workers' Union. In 1985 he was appointed a member of the Southland Polytechnic Council. He was vice president (1991) and president (1992–93) of the Southland Council of Trade Unions.

== Political career ==
New Zealand Parliament
Years	Term	Electorate	List	Party
1993–1996	44th	Invercargill		Labour
1996–1999	45th	Invercargill	21	Labour
1999–2002	46th	Invercargill	27	Labour
2002–2005	47th	Invercargill	28	Labour

In 1975 he joined the Labour Party and in 1977 he unsuccessfully stood for the Wellington City Council on the Labour ticket.

Peck won the National Party dominated electorate of Invercargill in the 1993 election. Soon after entering parliament he supported Helen Clark in her successful leadership challenge to Mike Moore. From 1996 to 1999 he was Shadow Minister of Revenue under Clark.

In 2002, he missed out getting promoted to cabinet and after that, he became more distant to his party colleagues and started feeling lonely. He represented the electorate until retiring from the House of Representatives twelve years later in September 2005; he claims that he made the decision to retire at his birthday in 2004.

During his hiatus from politics, he has been a director of the anti-smoking organisation Smokefree Coalition. In 2009 he opened a café "Little Peckish" in central Wellington with his wife Margaret. He retired and sold the café in 2021.

In the October 2013 local elections, Peck successfully ran for Wellington City Council in the Lambton ward. Peck voted for Wellington City Council to introduce a 'living wage' for council employees. However he did not intend to apply a living wage to those he employs in his cafe. Peck retired at the local elections in October 2016.

== Personal life ==
In early 2005, after crashing his car while drunk driving, Peck spoke publicly about his addiction to alcohol since he was a young man, and how he had checked himself into an addiction rehabilitation centre. He and his wife have three children.

== Notes ==
New Zealand Parliament
Preceded by Rob Munro	Member of Parliament for Invercargill; 1993–2005	Succeeded by Eric Roy
