= 1876 Invercargill mayoral election =

1876 mayoral election in Invercargill, New Zealand

- 21 July 1876
- Turnout: 449
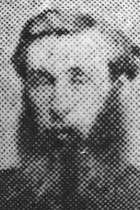
| Candidate | John Cuthbertson | Richard Matthews | Robert Cleave |
| Party | Independent | Independent | Independent |
| Popular vote | 266 | 108 | 75 |
| Percentage | 59.24 | 24.05 | 16.70 |
Mayor before election
John Walker Mitchell
Elected mayor
John Cuthbertson

The 1876 Invercargill mayoral election was held on 21 July 1876.

John Cuthbertson was elected mayor.

== Results ==
The following table gives the election results:

1876 Invercargill mayoral election
| Party | Candidate | Votes | % | ±% |
|---|---|---|---|---|
| Independent | John Cuthbertson | 266 | 59.24 | |
| Independent | Richard Matthews | 108 | 24.05 | |
| Independent | Robert Cleave | 75 | 16.70 | |
| Majority | | 158 | 35.19 | |
| Turnout | | 449 | | |
