= Reginald Miles =

New Zealand Army officer

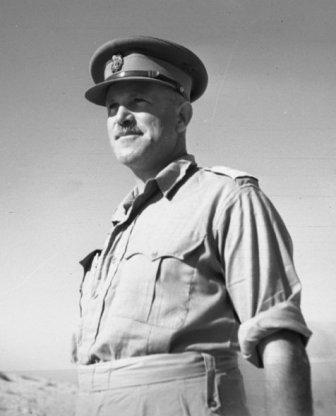
- Brigadier Miles, 1940–41
- Born: 10 December 1892; Springston, New Zealand
- Died: 20 October 1943 (aged 50); Figueras, Spain
- Burial place: Figueras Municipal Cemetery, Figueras
- Military career
- Allegiance: New Zealand
- Branch: New Zealand Military Forces
- Service years: 1914–1943
- Rank: Brigadier
- Service number: 6191
- Conflicts: First World War; Gallipoli campaign; Western Front; Second World War; Battle of Greece; Western Desert campaign
- Awards: Commander of the Order of the British Empire; Distinguished Service Order & Bar; Military Cross; Mentioned in Despatches (2); Cross of Valour (Greece)

Brigadier Reginald Miles, CBE, DSO & Bar, MC (10 December 1892 – 20 October 1943) was a professional soldier who served in the New Zealand Military Forces during the First and Second World Wars.

Miles was a New Zealand entrant into the Australian Royal Military College, Duntroon, from which he graduated in 1914. He served as an artillery officer in the First World War and was awarded the Distinguished Service Order for his actions during the German spring offensive. He remained in the military after the war, holding artillery commands for the next several years. When the Second World War broke out, Miles was the Quartermaster General of the New Zealand Military Forces. In 1940, he was seconded to the 2nd New Zealand Division as its commander of artillery. He saw action during the Battle of Greece and later during Operation Crusader in North Africa. Captured during fighting near Tobruk in late 1941, he was held in a prisoner of war camp in Italy but escaped in April 1943 with five other officers, including fellow New Zealander James Hargest. By October, Miles had made his way to Spain where, overcome with depression, he committed suicide.

== Early life ==
Reginald Miles was born in Springston, near Christchurch, on 10 December 1892 to William and Mary Miles, who were farmers. Educated at Rangiora High School, he was commissioned in the school cadets in 1910. He was one of the limited number of officer cadets from New Zealand who, in 1911, enrolled in the Royal Military College in Duntroon, Australia, as part of the college's first intake following its establishment.

== First World War ==
A highly rated student, Miles was in the final year of his cadetship at Duntroon when the First World War broke out in the summer of 1914. He immediately volunteered for the New Zealand Expeditionary Force (NZEF) and was posted to the Canterbury Infantry Battalion. He took ill before the NZEF left New Zealand for the Middle East and was discharged. On recovery, he re-enlisted in the NZEF and this time was posted to a howitzer battery in the New Zealand Field Artillery. He embarked for Egypt in December 1914 with a draft of reinforcements for the NZEF. He held the rank of captain during the Gallipoli campaign and was badly wounded in July 1915. After he recovered, he returned to the front shortly before the evacuation from Gallipoli in December 1915. He was briefly the adjutant of the 1st Field Artillery Brigade but later transferred to the 15th Battery. He served on the Western Front with this unit and participated in the Battle of the Somme in the second half of 1916. As a result of his gallantry in action he was awarded the Military Cross (MC) in December 1916. In May 1917 he was promoted to major and appointed commander of a howitzer battery.

In July 1918, Miles was awarded the Distinguished Service Order (DSO), having originally been recommended for the Victoria Cross, for his actions during the German spring offensive. His battery had come under threat from an advance by the enemy. He rounded up nearby infantry to reinforce his position, which had nearly exhausted its ammunition, and manned a fire trench. He then undertook a reconnaissance ahead of his position but was wounded by sniper fire. The citation for the DSO read:

For conspicuous gallantry and devotion to duty. He fought his battery until the enemy were within 500 yards, and his ammunition exhausted, at the same time rallying infantry stragglers and manning a fire trench, then made a reconnaissance into a wood sending back valuable information. He was finally wounded by rifle fire at close range.

— The London Gazette, No. 30813, 23 July 1918

After recuperating from his wounds, Miles returned to active service in July as brigade major of the Field Artillery of the New Zealand Division. He was mentioned in despatches in November 1918. The war ended that same month, due to the Armistice with Germany.

== Interwar period ==
After his return to New Zealand, Miles served as commander of Wellington Harbour's defences. In 1924 he was posted to England to attend the British Staff College at Camberley, England, after which he undertook specialist artillery courses. He returned to New Zealand in 1926 and, after serving at Army Headquarters in Wellington, was posted to Auckland to command artillery units. While in Auckland, he was awarded the King George V Silver Jubilee Medal. In 1937, he was promoted to colonel and appointed commander of the Northern Military District. The following year he was again sent to England to attend the Imperial Defence College. He was then attached to the War Office for three months before returning to New Zealand in 1939. In September 1939, he was appointed Quartermaster General of the New Zealand Military Forces.

== Second World War ==
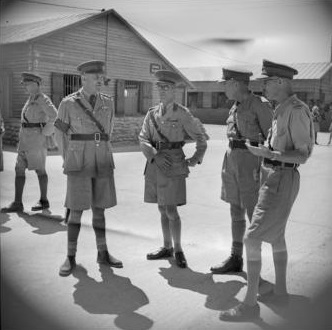
Brigadier Reginald Miles (left front, with arm band), Harold Barrowclough (centre) and Graham Parkinson (2nd right) await a medal ceremony, Maadi, Egypt. Major General Bernard Freyberg is at the extreme left.

In January 1940, Miles was promoted to brigadier and seconded to the newly raised 2nd New Zealand Division as its commander, Royal Artillery. His command consisted of three field regiments, one for each brigade of the division, as well as an anti-tank regiment. In March 1940, he was dispatched to Egypt, where the first elements of the division had arrived, but was then sent to England, where he would spend the rest of the year. Here he commanded a portion of the division that had been diverted there while in transit. An initial attempt to join the main part of the division in the Middle East in October 1940 was foiled when the ship he was travelling on was bombed and forced to return to England.

=== Greece ===
Miles served throughout the Greece campaign and played a key role in the organisation of the withdrawal of the division as it retreated ahead of the advancing Germans. His artillery allowed the New Zealand infantry to defend against attacks in daylight and then withdraw at night. The artillery was particularly vital in covering the undefended high ground on the flanks of 6th Infantry Brigade as it manned a holding position at Thermopylae. Miles was mentioned in despatches for his work during this period. and was also awarded the Greek Cross of Valour. He briefly took command of all New Zealand forces on Crete, to where the bulk of the division had been evacuated from Greece, but after a few days went on to Egypt and missed the subsequent Battle of Crete. Some of his artillery units had also left Crete, albeit without much of their equipment, prior to the fighting.

=== North Africa ===
After convalescing, Miles re-joined the 2nd New Zealand Division in North Africa, where it was reforming after the losses incurred in Greece and on Crete. He then participated in Operation Crusader. During this campaign, aimed at lifting the besieged port of Tobruk, the 2nd New Zealand Division was involved in heavy fighting around Sidi Rezegh, where Miles deployed artillery in support of the 6th Infantry Brigade. Having established a corridor to Tobruk, the commander of the division, Major General Bernard Freyberg, was becoming concerned that they would be unable to hold it open. On 30 November, he entrusted Miles with getting permission from Lieutenant General Alfred Godwin-Austen, the corps commander, to withdraw into or alongside Tobruk. Tentative permission was granted but only if Sidi Rezegh could not be held. However, the same day the 6th Brigade was overrun by elements of the 15th Panzer Division.

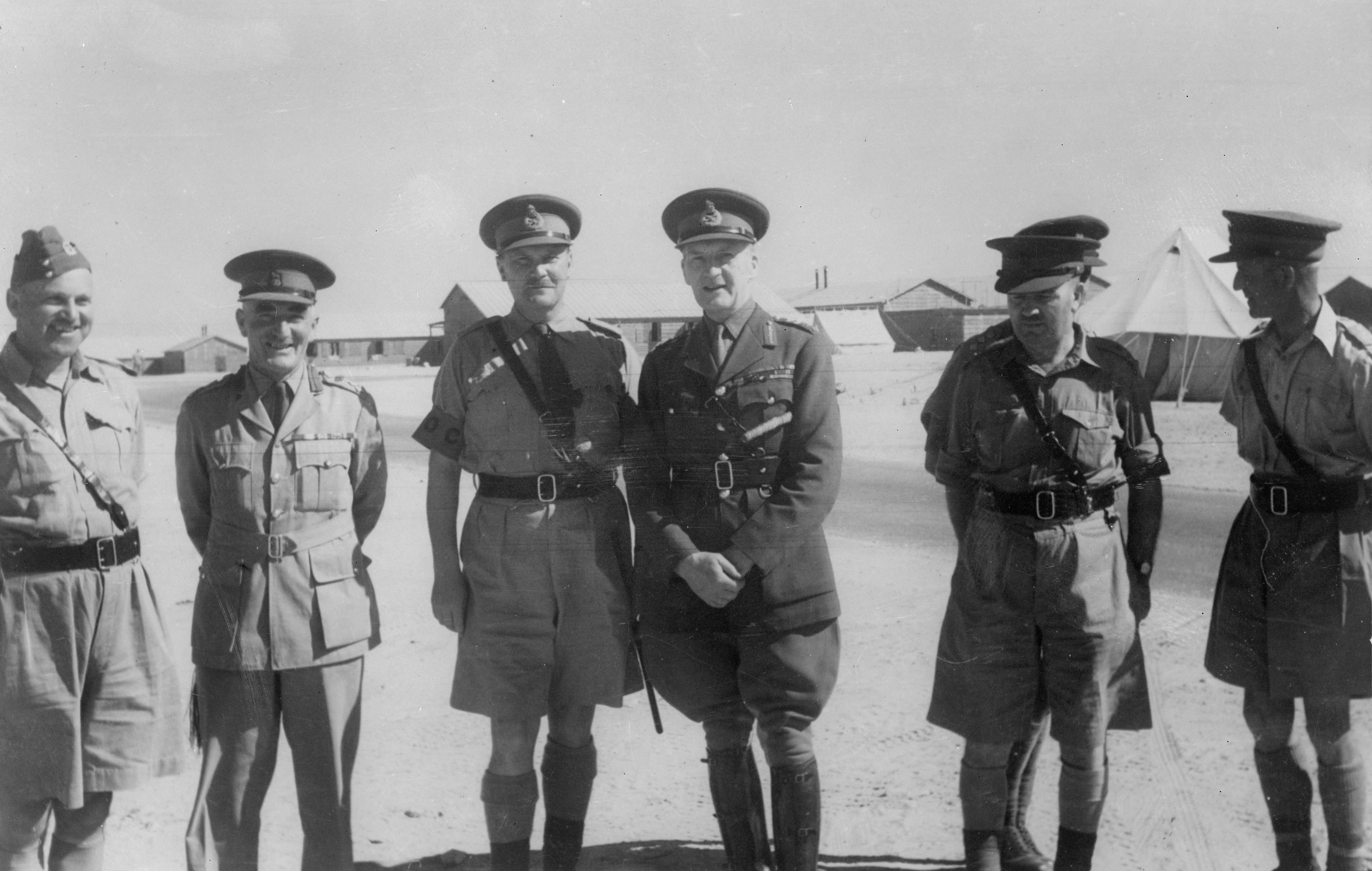
General Sir John Dill, British Chief of the Imperial General Staff, visits Maadi Camp, Egypt. From left to right: Brigadiers R. Miles and E. Puttick, Major General Freyberg and General Dill, Brigadiers J. Hargest and H. E. Barrowclough.

Miles advised Freyberg, still unaware of the fate of 6th Brigade due to poor communications, of Godwin-Austen's instructions on his return to the 2nd New Zealand Division's headquarters early on 1 December. Later that day, the 6th Field Regiment was overrun by German forces advancing to Belhamed. Miles, concerned about his artillery given the uncertainty surrounding the status of the 6th Brigade, was present on an inspection of the battle zone and he moved about, rifle in hand, encouraging his men, and directing them to fire their guns over open sights. Eventually, he was wounded and taken prisoner. This action was the most costly day of the war for the divisional artillery, with 275 casualties, including 96 prisoners of war, Miles among them.

=== Prisoner of War ===
Together with Brigadier James Hargest, the commander of the New Zealand 5th Infantry Brigade and captured around the same time, Miles arrived in the Italian prisoner-of-war camp Vincigliata PG 12 in 1942. The camp was a medieval castle near Florence, where he found himself amongst other captured high-ranking personnel such as Lieutenant General Sir Philip Neame, General Sir Richard O'Connor and Air Marshal Owen Tudor Boyd. Miles settled into camp routine and became a gardener, and was actively involved in escape attempts. Together with Hargest, he escaped through a tunnel that he helped to build and made his way to Switzerland in April 1943. Neame received a coded letter announcing their success a fortnight later.

Miles was one of only three men (Hargest was one of the others) known to British Military Intelligence to have escaped from an Italian prisoner-of-war camp and make their way to another country prior to the armistice with Italy. In Switzerland, Miles and Hargest split up and travelled independently. As Hargest wrote in his book Farewell Campo 12, "I was over in Lucerne when Miles rang up to say he was off, and to suggest I should follow him later". Having travelled as far as the Spanish frontier on 20 October 1943, exhausted and depressed, Miles shot himself. He was buried with military honours, and escorted to his final resting place in the Figueras Municipal Cemetery by members of the British Consulate and a party of Spanish officers. Shortly before his death, his appointment as a Commander of the Order of the British Empire was confirmed.

Miles was posthumously awarded a bar to his DSO for his efforts in escaping from Italy. The citation for the bar, published in the New Zealand Gazette on 21 September 1944, read:

"Escape from Camp 12, P.M. 3200, Italy (General's Camp). This camp was extremely well guarded and in consequence it was decided that the only possible method of escape would be by way of a tunnel. On the 18th September, 1942, tunnelling began. All officers and other ranks worked, with the exception of one officer who was awaiting repatriation. The entrance to the tunnel was through a sealed up chapel which all soil was placed. The work, which consisted of a 3 foot by 3 foot tunnel, 40 feet long with a 10 foot shaft at the entrance and a 7 foot shaft at the exit, was completed by the end of February 1943. At 2100 hours on the 29th March, 1943, Brigadiers Miles and Hargest, in company with four other officers, escaped through the tunnel. The four other officers were subsequently recaptured. Brigadiers Miles and Hargest dressed as workmen and having walked to Florence station, caught a train to Milan where they went to the North station. They caught a train to Como and walked towards Chiasso. 2 kilometres from Chiasso they left the main road and proceeded across country until they reached a knoll south of Chiasso where the frontier lay along the opposite slope of a valley below them. The frontier consisted of heavy cyclone netting 12 foot high interlaced with brambles and with small bells near the top. They cut the wire with pliers at ground level without making much noise and came on to Swiss territory at 220 hours on the 30th March, 1943. They gave themselves up to the police at Mendrisio and were released in Berne on the 2nd April, 1943.

— The New Zealand Gazette, 21 September 1944

== Legacy ==
Miles was survived by his four daughters from his marriage to Aimée Zita Donnelly, whom he had married in Egypt in 1916, and his second wife, Rosalind Georgette Bisset-Smith, whom he had wed in 1940 following the death of his first wife a few years previously. His second marriage did not result in any children. His only son was a lieutenant in the Fleet Air Arm; he also served in the Second World War and was killed travelling aboard HMS Glorious when the ship was attacked and sunk by the German battleships Scharnhorst and Gneisenau off Norway on 8 June 1940.

=== Medals ===
Miles' medals were held by the family, who had managed to collect them after some had been lost. On 13 August 2009, they were donated to the National Army Museum at Waiouru, New Zealand, in a presentation ceremony attended by the New Zealand Chief of Army, Major General Rhys Jones.
