= James Hargest =

New Zealand politician and army officer

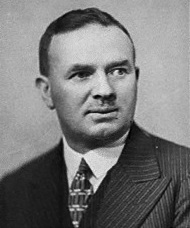
- Hargest in 1935
- Born: 4 September 1891; Gore, New Zealand
- Died: 12 August 1944 (aged 52); Normandy, France
- Military career
- Allegiance: New Zealand
- Branch: New Zealand Military Forces
- Rank: Brigadier
- Service number: 31156
- Commands: 2nd Battalion, Otago Infantry Regiment; 5th Infantry Brigade
- Conflicts: First World War; Gallipoli campaign; Western Front; Second World War; Battle of Greece; Battle of Crete; Operation Crusader; Normandy landings; Operation Overlord †
- Awards: Commander of the Order of the British Empire; Distinguished Service Order & Two Bars; Military Cross; Efficiency Decoration; Mentioned in dispatches Legion of Honour (France); War Cross (Greece)

Brigadier James Hargest, CBE, DSO & Two Bars, MC, ED (4 September 1891 – 12 August 1944) was an officer of the New Zealand Military Forces, serving in both the First and Second World Wars. He was a Member of New Zealand's Parliament from 1931 to 1944, representing firstly the Invercargill and then the Awarua electorates.

Born in Gore in 1891, Hargest was a farmer when he volunteered for the New Zealand Expeditionary Force following the outbreak of the First World War in August 1914. Commissioned as an officer, he served in the Gallipoli campaign in 1915 and was seriously wounded. Following his recovery from his wounds, he returned to active duty on the Western Front. He commanded an infantry battalion during the later stages of the war and received several awards for his leadership. After the war, he returned to New Zealand to resume farming. In 1931 Hargest entered the Parliament of New Zealand as the member for Invercargill. Initially an independent, he was one of the strongest supporters of the National Party that was formed in 1936, and held an executive role in the party hierarchy. From 1938, he represented the Awarua electorate and had been considered for the party leadership, but he was no longer available once he volunteered for active service.

Upon the commencement of the Second World War in September 1939, Hargest attempted to join the Second New Zealand Expeditionary Force being raised for service. His application was initially declined for health reasons, but after intervention by Peter Fraser, the acting Prime Minister of New Zealand, he was accepted and appointed commander of the 5th Infantry Brigade, part of the 2nd New Zealand Division. He led his brigade during the Battle of Greece in April 1941 after an initial period performing garrison duty in England. During the Battle of Crete he displayed poor judgement in positioning his forces around the vital Maleme airfield and in controlling their movements once the battle commenced. The loss of the airfield allowed the Germans to gain a foothold on the island and the Allied forces eventually were evacuated from Crete. Despite his own performance during the battle, he received a bar to the Distinguished Service Order (DSO) that he had been awarded in the First World War. The fighting now shifting to North Africa, Hargest led his brigade during Operation Crusader in November 1941 but was captured by German forces. Held in a prisoner of war camp in Italy, he eventually escaped and was able to make his return to England in late 1943. He earned a second bar to his DSO for his efforts. He served as an observer with the British 50th Infantry Division for the Normandy landings in June 1944 and was killed by artillery just over two months later.

== Early life ==
James Hargest was born on 4 September 1891 in Gore, a small town in Southland, New Zealand. His parents, James and Mary Hargest, were from Wales. His father was a labourer who later took up farming in Mandeville. Hargest was the fourth of nine children, and attended schools in Gore and Mandeville and after completing his education worked alongside his father. He joined the Territorial Force in 1911 and by 1914 had reached the rank of sergeant.

== First World War ==
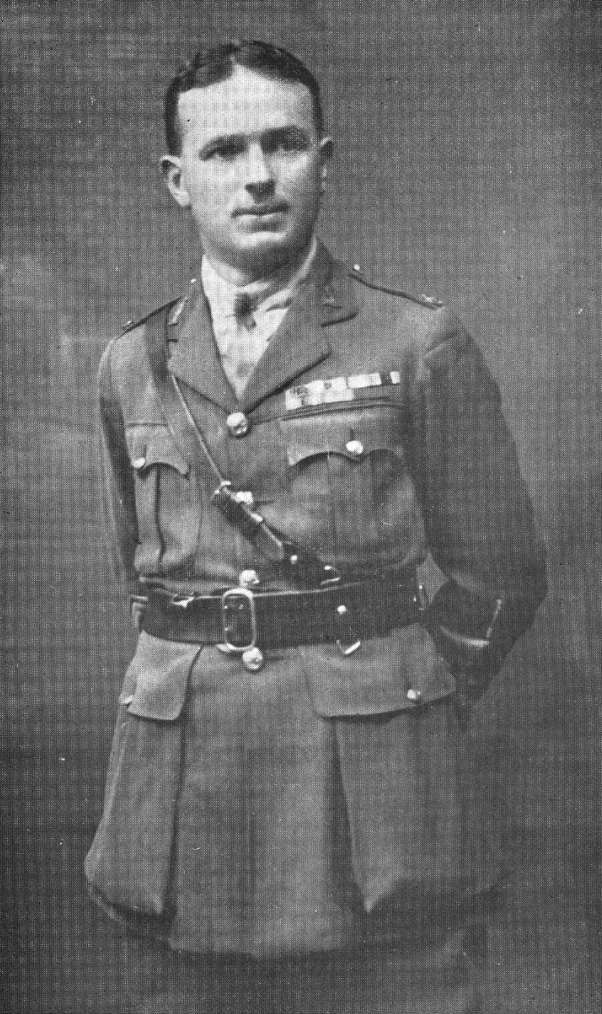
Hargest as a lieutenant colonel, 1918

Following the outbreak of the First World War in August 1914 Hargest volunteered to serve in the New Zealand Expeditionary Force (NZEF) and was commissioned as a second lieutenant in the Otago Mounted Rifles. He served in the Gallipoli campaign and was severely wounded during the August Offensive. After several months of convalescence, he returned to active service in July 1916 with the New Zealand Division. Assigned to the 1st Battalion of the Otago Infantry Regiment, he commanded a company during the Battle of the Somme in September 1916. His actions in restoring order in his battalion, when he assumed command of four companies that had suffered heavy casualties following a failed attack on 27 September, saw him rewarded with the Military Cross. The citation for his MC, which appeared in The London Gazette in December, reads as follows:

For conspicuous gallantry in action. He organised and led a bombing party, thereby driving the enemy back and securing his left flank. Later, he organised the defence of the position with great skill at a critical time.

By the end of the year he had been promoted to major.

Appointed to second-in-command of the battalion, Hargest was involved in the preliminary planning for the Battle of Messines in June 1917. He carried out vital reconnaissance of the German front lines, penetrating the enemy communication trenches in the lead up to the battle. During the German spring offensive, launched in March 1918, he was made acting battalion commander. In September 1918, he was promoted to lieutenant colonel and given command of the 2nd Battalion, Otago Infantry Regiment. He participated in the last offensive action of the war involving the New Zealand Division when on 4 November 1918, a week before the armistice with Germany, his battalion attacked Germans positioned in a fortified house in the Mormal Forest. Having captured the house, it was made his temporary headquarters. It later received a direct hit from artillery fire and Hargest was fortunate to escape unhurt. His leadership of his battalion during the last few months of the war was recognised with an appointment to the Distinguished Service Order, a mention in despatches and the French Legion of Honour. The citation for his DSO states the following:

For conspicuous gallantry and devotion to duty during an advance. He commanded his battalion with marked ability. His tactical dispositions were excellent, and he secured and forwarded valuable information. Constantly in the front trenches he inspired all ranks with the keenest offensive spirit, and the uninterrupted success of the battalion operations were largely due to his fine personal leadership.

In the immediate postwar period, he remained in command of his battalion while it performed occupation duties in Cologne until his departure to England on 4 February 1919.

== Interwar period ==
Hargest returned to New Zealand in May 1919 with his wife, Marie Henrietta Wilkie. The couple had been married since 1917, the ceremony taking place in England where Marie was serving as a nurse in the New Zealand military hospital at Brockenhurst. Hargest returned to farming, buying land near Invercargill. He retained an interest in the military and resumed his career with the Territorials in which he commanded firstly a regiment and then an infantry brigade.

An interest in local affairs soon developed and Hargest became involved with several local authorities including the Southland Education Board. In the 1925 election, he contested the Invercargill electorate standing for the Reform Party and came very close to beating Sir Joseph Ward. The former Prime Minister had a majority of 159 votes, which represented a 1.5% margin. The death of Sir Joseph triggered the August 1930 by-election, which was contested by Hargest and Ward's second son, Vincent Ward. Hargest was beaten in by Ward Jr., who had a majority of 571 votes (5.82%), and Hargest had thus been beaten by both father and son.

New Zealand Parliament
Years	Term	Electorate	Party
1931–1935	24th	Invercargill	Independent
1935–1936	25th	Awarua	Independent
1936–1938	Changed allegiance to:		National
1938–1943	26th	Awarua	National
1943–1944	27th	Awarua	National

Ward Jr. retired at the end of the term, and this allowed Hargest to enter the New Zealand Parliament in the 1931 general election on his third attempt, becoming the MP for the Invercargill electorate. In parliament, Hargest was an advocate for the interests of Southland but was also interested in defence and educational matters. He held this electorate until 1935 before successfully switching to the Awarua electorate for the 1935 election. Initially an independent Reform MP, he was a supporter of the coalition between the United Party and the Reform Party. When the coalition combined to become the National Party, Hargest formally joined the new party and was "possibly the Reform MP most committed from the first to the formation of the National Party". In its early period of the National Party, there was a lengthy discussion about its leadership, as the previous leaders of the constituent parties were not acceptable to the other. At the time, many South Island MPs would meet at the home of Christchurch property developer Henry G. Livingstone after arriving on Saturday mornings on the overnight ferry from Wellington; Hargest, Adam Hamilton, and Sidney Holland belonged to that group. At the first official meeting of the party's Dominion Council in October 1936 in Wellington, Hargest joined the executive committee. Following that meeting, the leadership question resulted in a contest between Hamilton and Charles Wilkinson. Former Reform Party leader Gordon Coates and other MPs sided with Hamilton and issued a press statement that bordered on blackmail, and Hargest wrote to Coates, rebuking him for his stance and pleading for unity, as the new party was still fragile. In the event, Hamilton won the election by one vote and became National's first leader.

For much of the period that he was in charge of the National Party, Hamilton was regarded a conscientious but lack-lustre leader. Although National's performance had improved in the 1938 election election by winning an additional six electorates, Labour was still in government and there were discussions about replacing Hamilton. Hargest, who had retained his Awarua seat for National in the election, was one of two contenders for the party leadership (the other was Keith Holyoake, but he had lost his Motueka electorate). With the outbreak of the Second World War, Hargest immediately volunteered for active service. The National Party leadership eventually went to Sidney Holland in November 1940; there was a view that this was a temporary situation that could be reassessed once Holyoake or Hargest returned to Parliament. Hargest remained a member of parliament during his time on active service and in the 1943 election, he was the sole candidate in the Awarua electorate whilst an internee in Switzerland; he was thus returned unopposed.

In 1935, Hargest was awarded the King George V Silver Jubilee Medal.

== Second World War ==
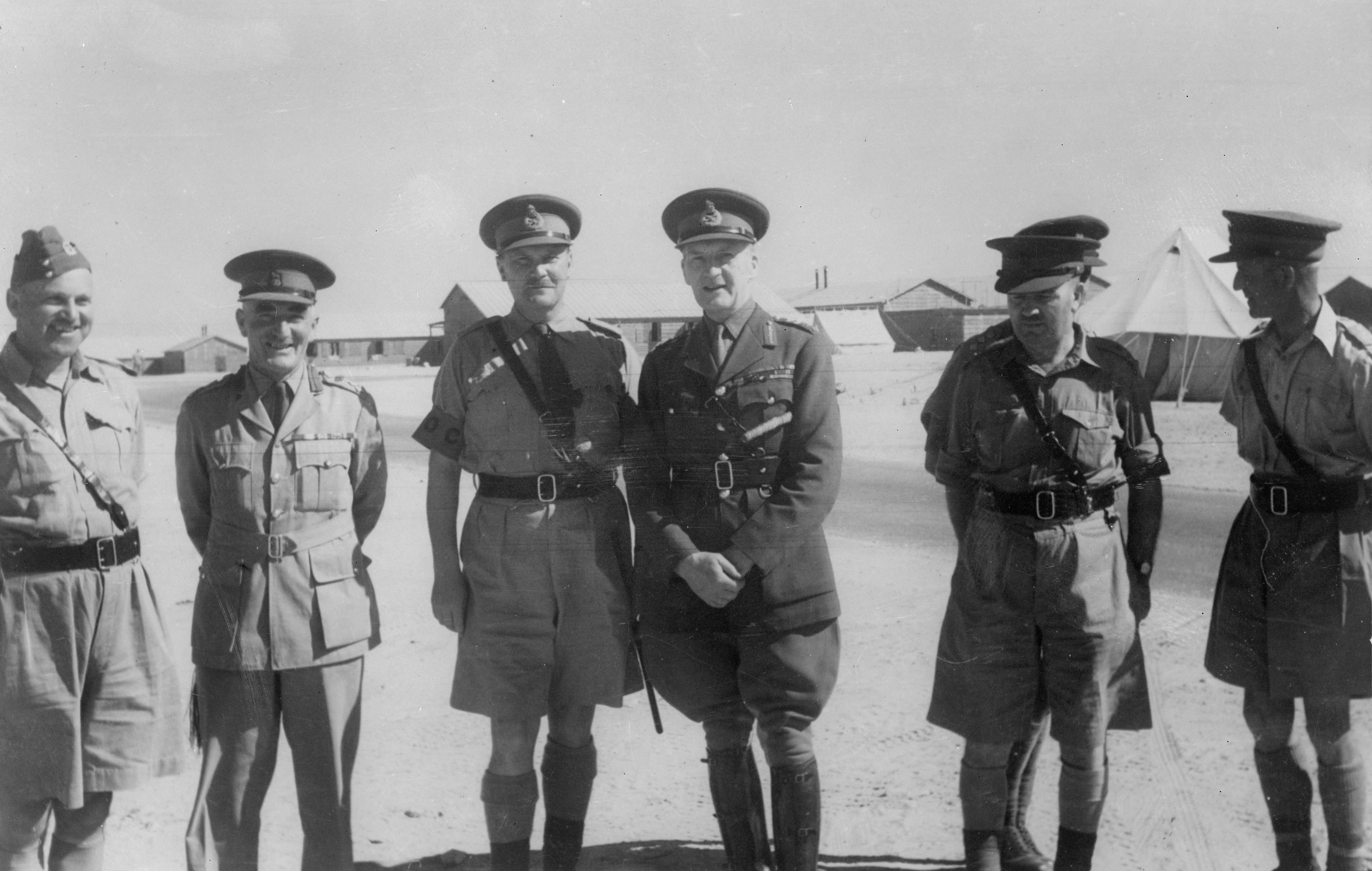
General Sir John Dill, British Chief of the Imperial General Staff, visits Maadi Camp, Egypt. From left to right: Brigadiers Reginald Miles and Edward Puttick, Major General Freyberg and General Dill, Brigadiers J. Hargest and Harold Barrowclough.

On volunteering for service in the war, Hargest sought to serve abroad in command of one of the infantry brigades of the Second New Zealand Expeditionary Force (2NZEF). The new commander of the 2NZEF, Major General Bernard Freyberg was concerned about the age and command experience of some potential senior officers of the 2NZEF such as Hargest. A medical assessment deemed Hargest fit only for service on the Home Front as he was still prone to bouts of shell shock from his service during the First World War. Disappointed with this decision, he approached Peter Fraser, the acting Prime Minister of New Zealand, with a request for a brigade command in 2NZEF. Fraser disregarded official advice and arranged for Hargest to be appointed commander of the 5th Infantry Brigade. At the time, the Chief of the General Staff of the New Zealand Military Forces, Major-General John Duigan, wrote to Freyberg, disassociating himself from the decision.

Hargest, with the rank of brigadier, left New Zealand with the Second Echelon, in which his brigade (which comprised the 21st, 22nd and 23rd Battalions) was the largest formation, in May 1940. Originally intended to join the First Echelon of 2NZEF then in Egypt, it was diverted en route to England in response to the threat of Operation Sea Lion, the planned German invasion. The brigade carried out training and guard duties in the area around Dover before being shipped to Egypt in early 1941.

=== Greece and Crete ===
Within a matter of weeks, the brigade, as part of the 2nd New Zealand Division, was in Greece and manning defences on the Aliakmon Line in preparation for the anticipated invasion of the country by the Germans. Following the invasion, Hargest's brigade mounted a spirited defence of its positions at Olympus Pass from 14 to 16 April before it had to withdraw to provide cover neighbouring New Zealand brigades conducting their own retreat. The brigade was eventually evacuated on the night of 24 April to Crete.

Hargest and his brigade took part in the subsequent Battle of Crete in May. The 2nd New Zealand Division was under the command of Brigadier Edward Puttick due to Freyberg taking command of Creforce, which consisted of all the Allied troops on Crete. Puttick gave Hargest's brigade the task of defending the airfield at Maleme and its easterly approaches. The 22nd Battalion, commanded by Lieutenant Colonel Leslie Andrew, guarded the airfield itself and a neighbouring hill, Point 107, with the other two battalions of the brigade positioned further east while Hargest situated his headquarters at some distance from the airfield. Within days of arriving on Crete, the Allied positions began to be the subject of strafing and bombing attacks by German planes as a precursor to an airborne invasion mounted by Fallschirmjager (paratroopers) of the 1st Parachute Division. The bombing triggered in Hargest a re-occurrence of his shell shock, rendering him lethargic and confused.

When gliders containing paratroopers began landing around and to the west of the airfield on 20 May, Andrew became cut off from several of his platoons and companies with some being overrun by the German forces. Unable to gauge how the situation was unfolding, his communications with Hargest back at brigade headquarters also became disjointed. Andrew stressed the seriousness of the situation to Hargest and requested reinforcements from the other battalions, which were more than holding their own. Hargest incorrectly advised that there were no available troops. This left Andrew with his own small platoon-size reserve, which was used in a failed counter-attack. Eventually, Andrew sought permission to withdraw from Point 107; Hargest replied "Well, if you must, you must". Although well aware of the importance of Maleme Airfield to the defence of Crete, Hargest made no effort to dissuade Andrew or see the situation for himself. Despite the belated arrival of a reinforcing company of infantry sent by Hargest that evening, Andrew decided his position was not defensible in daylight and withdrew his units to join the other battalions of the brigade. The Germans took both the airfield and Point 107 early on the morning of 21 May. The capture of the airfield allowed German reinforcements to be landed directly on Crete and establish a strong foothold on their otherwise tenuous positions.

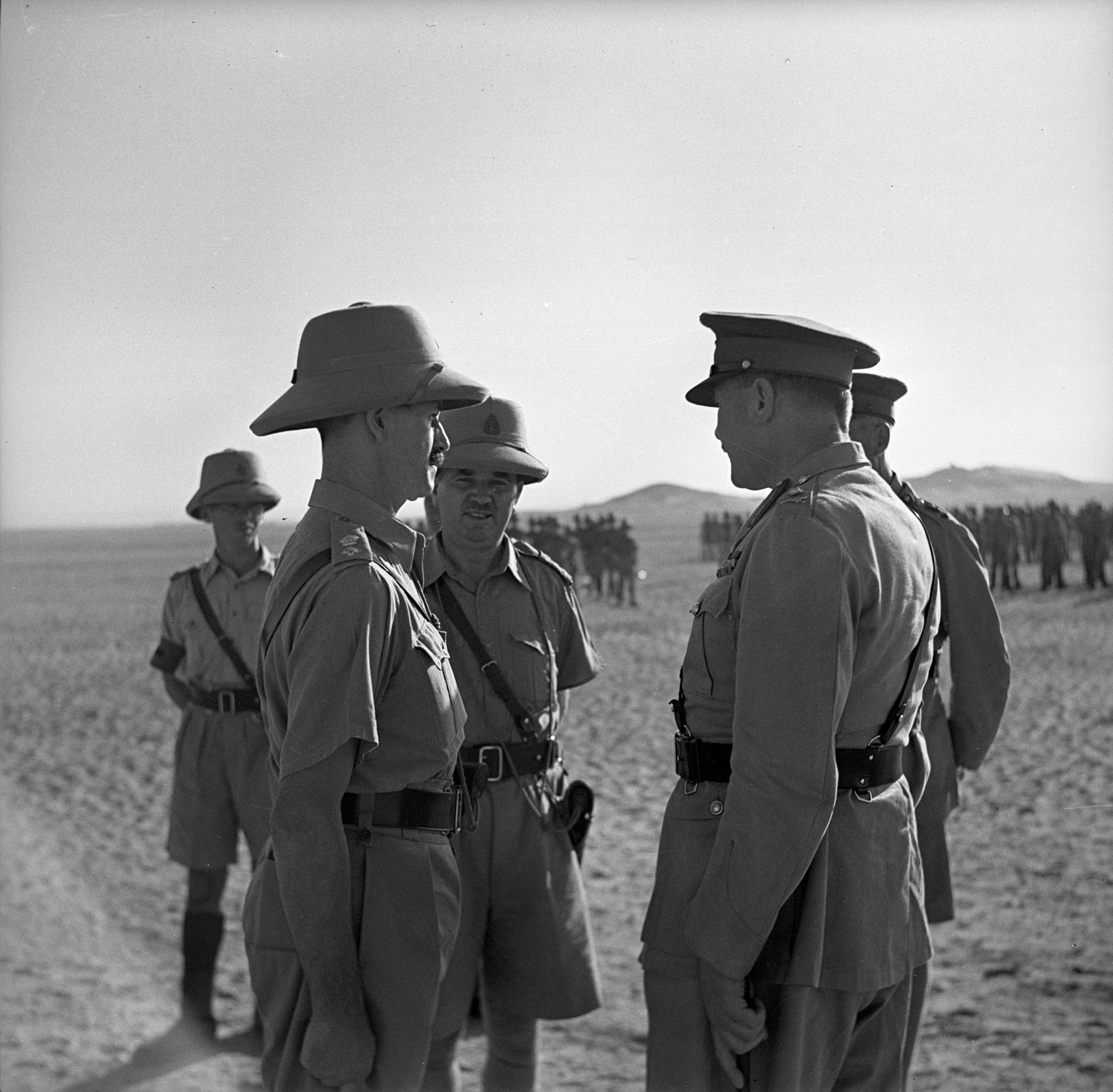
Hargest, centre front, with Lieutenant Colonel Leslie Andrew (left) and Major General Bernard Freyberg, Egypt, July 1941.

A counterattack to take back the airfield and Point 107 was organised for the following day at Hargest's headquarters. He was exhausted and had to take a quick nap before a conference to work out detailed plans for the counter-attack, much to the disgust of some of the other participants. Afterwards, he became pessimistic of the chances of success and sought to have the attack called off. The attack did fail but Hargest, still well behind the frontlines, mistakenly believed it to be going well until he found that his brigade had returned to their starting positions. His pessimism began to affect Puttick, who asked Freyberg to allow the 5th Infantry Brigade to withdraw, which it duly did. This began an eventual retreat and evacuation from Crete on 31 May, with Hargest flying out for Egypt by seaplane, his brigade following by sea.

Once he was back in Egypt, Hargest was critical of Freyberg's conduct of the fighting on Crete in a meeting with General Archibald Wavell, commander of the Allied forces in the Middle East. He expressed similar views in a meeting with the New Zealand Prime Minister, Peter Fraser, who was in Egypt at the time on a visit to the New Zealand forces. He also voiced concern over what he considered to be a lack of consultation by Freyberg with his senior commanders. He was able to resolve his differences with Freyberg and in later correspondence with Fraser expressed his satisfaction with the way Freyberg dealt with his subordinates. Hargest's performance on Crete escaped official scrutiny and he was awarded a bar to his DSO. He was also awarded the Greek War Cross for his services in the military campaigns in Greece and Crete.

=== North Africa ===
After the loss of Crete, the 2nd New Zealand Division underwent a period of refit and training before it was assigned to the Eighth Army, which was then engaged in the North African Campaign. It took part in Operation Crusader in November 1941 where the Eighth Army attempted to break through to Tobruk. Hargest's brigade was used to cover the movements of the other two brigades of the division, which were attempting to advance through to Tobruk. The Afrika Korps, commanded by Generalleutnant (lieutenant general) Erwin Rommel, had outflanked the Allies and were approaching Hargest's position, which was clustered with transport that made defending an attack difficult. He and 700 men of his brigade were captured on 27 November 1941 when his headquarters, situated on the edge of an airfield near Sidi Aziz, was overrun by German tanks. He had resisted moving his headquarters to a nearby escarpment and incorrectly insisted his orders did not allow him this latitude. After his capture he was taken to Rommel who, despite being irritated at Hargest's refusal to salute him, was complimentary of the fighting performance of the New Zealanders.

=== Prisoner of war ===
Hargest was transported to Italy where he was initially held in a villa near Sulmona but was transferred, along with a fellow New Zealander, Brigadier Reginald Miles, who had been captured in December 1941, to Castle Vincigliata, known as Campo 12, near Florence. Campo 12 was a prison camp for officers of general and brigadier rank and the prisoners were held under more comfortable conditions than soldiers of lesser rank. In late March 1943, a group of officers, including Hargest and Miles, managed to escape using a tunnel dug from a disused chapel within the castle walls. Of the six escapees, Hargest and Miles were the only two to reach safety in neutral Switzerland, where they split up to independently try to make their way to England. As Hargest later related "I was over in Lucerne when Miles rang up to say he was off, and to suggest I should follow him later". Miles made it to Figueras, close to the Spanish frontier, but, overcome with depression, killed himself on 20 October. With the help of the French Resistance, Hargest travelled through France to Spain, where he reached the British Consulate in Barcelona. He flew to England in December 1943.

Hargest was one of only three men (Miles was one of the others) known to British Military Intelligence to have escaped from an Italian prisoner of war camp and made their way to another country prior to the armistice with Italy. For his escape to Switzerland, Hargest was awarded a second bar to his DSO. He was later appointed a Commander of the Order of the British Empire. He also wrote an account of his escape which was published as the book Farewell Campo 12. Gabriel Nahas, a member of the French resistance who escorted Hargest part of the way from Switzerland to Spain, also wrote of the endeavour.

== Death and legacy ==
By early 1944, the 2nd New Zealand Division was fighting in the Italian Campaign and, with his former brigade commanded by Brigadier Howard Kippenberger, Hargest sought a new role. He was appointed New Zealand's observer of the D-Day landings in Normandy. He was attached to the 50th (Northumbrian) Infantry Division, of the 21st Army Group, with which he landed in Normandy on 6 June. He was wounded later that month.

After D-Day, a new role was found for Hargest. Now that the Allies were on mainland Europe, thought was turning to the issue of dealing with the expected arrival of New Zealanders from liberated prisoner of war camps. The 2NZEF Reception Group was set up to help repatriate them. Hargest was appointed the commander of the group but on 12 August 1944, was killed by shell fire during the Battle of Normandy, when he was making a farewell visit to the 50th (Northumbrian) Infantry Division. Hargest is buried at the Hottot-les-Bagues War Cemetery in France.

Hargest was survived by his wife and three children. A fourth child, Geoffrey Hargest, had been killed on 30 March 1944, aged 22 years, during the Battle of Monte Cassino while serving with the 23rd Battalion. He is buried in the Cassino War Cemetery. Another son was killed while on active service during the Malayan Emergency. James Hargest High School, an educational facility in Invercargill, is named after him.

== Notes ==
New Zealand Parliament
Preceded by Vincent Ward	Member of Parliament for Invercargill; 1931–1935	Succeeded by William Denham
Preceded by Philip De La Perrelle	Member of Parliament for Awarua; 1935–1944	Succeeded by George Herron
