= Norman Jones (politician) =

New Zealand politician (1923–1987)

Norman Jones QSM

Member of Parliament for Invercargill
- In office 1975–1987
- Preceded by: J. B. Munro
- Succeeded by: Rob Munro

Personal details
- Born: Norman Philip Hastings Jones; 15 August 1923 Invercargill, New Zealand
- Died: 19 November 1987 (aged 64) Invercargill, New Zealand
- Resting place: Eastern Cemetery, Invercargill
- Party: National Party
- Spouse: Marjory Millicent Moffat (m. 1950)
- Children: 6

Military service
- Allegiance: New Zealand
- Branch/service: 23rd Battalion
- Years of service: 1941–1942
- Rank: Private
- Battles/wars: World War II

Norman Philip Hastings Jones QSM (15 August 1923 – 19 November 1987) was a New Zealand National Party politician, who represented the Invercargill electorate in Parliament.

== Biography ==
New Zealand Parliament
Years	Term	Electorate	Party
1975–1978	38th	Invercargill	National
1978–1981	39th	Invercargill	National
1981–1984	40th	Invercargill	National
1984–1987	41st	Invercargill	National

Jones was born on 15 August 1923 in Invercargill. He was one of six brothers and two sisters and the only one of the brothers to complete primary school, although he left secondary school shortly before his 15th birthday. From that point on he held a number of short-term jobs, working principally as a farm labourer before he joined the New Zealand Army in 1941 after lying about his age. He served as a private in the 23rd Infantry Battalion during World War II and lost his right leg to tank-fire at the age of 19 in North Africa. After his war service he attended Otago and Victoria Universities and Dunedin Teachers' College. He taught at Wanganui for some time before returning south to become assistant master at Southland College. Subsequently, he worked at James Hargest High School and at Southland Boys' High School.

Jones and his wife Marjorie were committee members of the Save Manapouri campaign.

Jones was an Invercargill city councillor for 18 years, and served one term as deputy mayor. In the 1975 Queen's Birthday Honours, he was awarded the Queen's Service Medal for public services, for services to civil defence and the community. He became particularly notable for his vehement opposition to the Homosexual Law Reform Act 1986. Owing to his outspokenness on this and other issues, the media dubbed him "the mouth from the south".

"Turn around and look at them ... gaze upon them ... you're looking into Hades ... don't look too long – you might catch AIDS."

— Norman Jones referring to homosexuals in 1985

When the Labour Party won office in 1984, an economic summit took place in the parliamentary debating chamber. Representatives from industry, unions and community groups attended. Jones refused to vacate his seat, saying he would not give up his chair for some communist to sit down.

Jones first stood for Parliament at a by-election in 1945. He had contested seven elections before being chosen as the National candidate for Invercargill in 1975, when he beat the incumbent Labour representative, J. B. Munro. He remained in Parliament until shortly before his death in 1987.

Jones died on 19 November 1987 from a brain tumour at the age of 64. His autobiography, Jonesy, published five years earlier in 1982, detailed his wartime service and his political career. A number of the most controversial aspects and events of his public service occurred after the book's publication.

His wife Marjory was the president of the National Council of Women and was also an Invercargill city councillor, serving two terms from 1989 to 1995. She died in 2004.

== Notes ==
New Zealand Parliament
Preceded by J. B. Munro	Member of Parliament for Invercargill; 1975–1987	Succeeded by Rob Munro
