= William Denham =

New Zealand politician

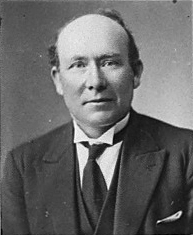

Member of the New Zealand Parliament for Invercargill
- In office 27 November 1935 – 27 November 1946
- Preceded by: James Hargest
- Succeeded by: Ralph Hanan

Personal details
- Born: William Mortimer Clarence Denham; August 1888 Sydney, New South Wales, Australia
- Died: 21 September 1969 (aged 81) Invercargill, New Zealand
- Resting place: Eastern Cemetery, Invercargill
- Party: Labour
- Spouse: Gwendolyn Evelyn Meadows (m. 1912)

William Mortimer Clarence Denham (August 1888 – 21 September 1969) was a New Zealand politician of the Labour Party.

== Biography ==
=== Early life and career ===
Denham was born in Sydney, New South Wales, Australia, in August 1888, and was educated both there and in Melbourne. He shifted to New Zealand in 1907 and settled in Invercargill working as a farmer and later as a tramway worker. For 12 years he was an employee representative to the Tramways Appeal Board.

=== Political career ===
New Zealand Parliament
Years	Term	Electorate	Party
1935–1938	25th	Invercargill	Labour
1938–1943	26th	Invercargill	Labour
1943–1946	27th	Invercargill	Labour

Denham began his political career in local-body affairs. He was elected to the Invercargill City Council in 1928 and was also a member of the Southland Technical College Board.

Denham first stood for Parliament in 1928 in the Awarua electorate, placing third. He then unsuccessfully contested the Invercargill electorate in the 1931 election; of the three candidates, he came last. He represented the Invercargill electorate in the House of Representatives from 1935 to 1946, when he was defeated. He was defeated twice more for the seat in the 1949 and 1954 general elections. While an MP he legislated for the establishment of the Invercargill Licensing Trust in 1944 and advocated for a special fund for writers, resulting in the formation of the Literary Grants Advisory Board.

Denham was also a strong advocate for state housing and was largely responsible for much of the progress in the government's state house building scheme. Denham was a strong supporter of John A. Lee, and was on his side all throughout the controversy that resulted in Lee being expelled from the Labour Party. He did not go as far as to join Lee's Democratic Labour Party however.

In 1947 he stood for the Invercargill mayoralty against incumbent Abraham Wachner. Denham polled respectably but was defeated by a margin of 997 votes.

=== Later life and death ===
Denham was a vocal critic of New Zealand's 1960 rugby tour of South Africa due to the exclusion of Māori players from the touring squad at the insistence of South Africa's apartheid government. He was a member of the Citizens All Black Tour Association (CABTA) who opposed the tour on the grounds of racial discrimination. He travelled to Wellington as part of a CABTA deputation. There he made a speech critical of Labour Prime Minister Walter Nash, accusing Nash of taking a "weak position" on the issue by neither supporting or opposing the tour. He also highlighted Nash's ideological inconsistency given that he had hitherto been an opponent of racism throughout his political career.

Denham later became chairman of the Invercargill Savings Bank. He died on 21 September 1969 at the age of 81. He is buried at Invercargill's Eastern Cemetery, along with his wife Gwendolyn who died 1 January 1971, and his mother-in-law Ada Meadows.

== Notes ==
New Zealand Parliament
Preceded by James Hargest	Member of Parliament for Invercargill; 1935–1946	Succeeded by Ralph Hanan
