= SBS Bank =

Retail bank in New Zealand

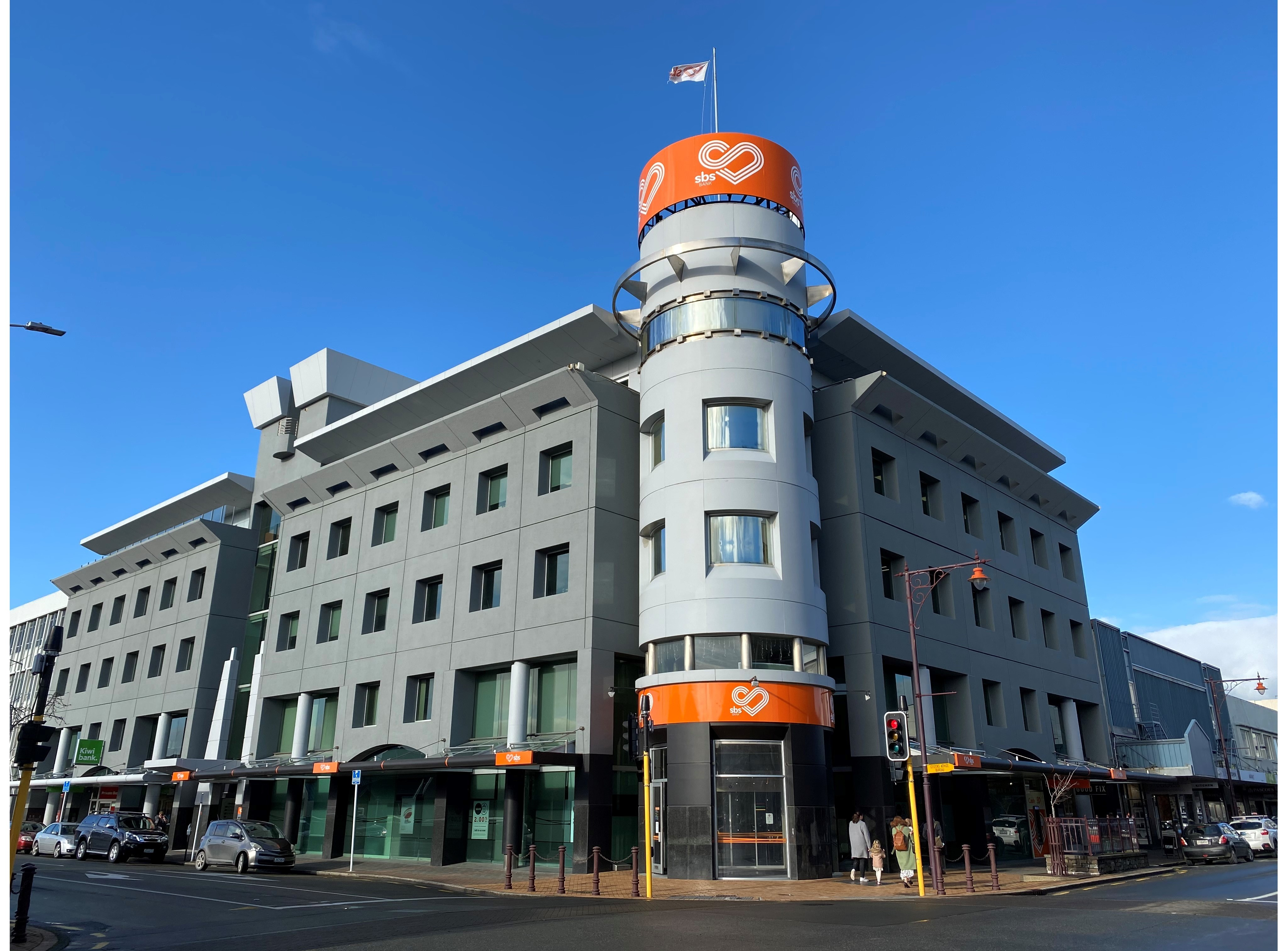
- Headquarters in Invercargill
- Type: Mutual bank
- Industry: Banking
- Founded: March 23, 1869; 157 years ago
- Headquarters: Invercargill, New Zealand
- Area served: New Zealand
- Key people: Mark McLean (CEO)\ Joe O’Connell (Board Chairman)
- Products: Banking; Insurance; Financial services Property
- Total assets: $4 billion
- Number of employees: 280+ (2018)
- Divisions: 2
- Website: www.sbsbank.co.nz

SBS Bank is a New Zealand registered bank which was founded in 1869. In October 2008 it gained bank registration and the Southland Building Society became SBS Bank. It is a fully New Zealand-owned registered bank that has retained a mutual building society structure.

The Bank has a BBB credit rating.

It uses the prefix 03 for its account numbers which is the same as Westpac Bank NZ because they use the same 'lines'. The bank's head office is based in Invercargill.

== History ==
SBS Bank was established in 1869, when one of its founders, James Walker Bain, walked 204 kilometers from Dunedin to Invercargill.The bank was founded in 1869 as the Southland Building, Land and Investment Society. Seven years later in 1876 it was renamed as Southland Building and Investment Society and Bank of Deposit. The bank's purpose was to provide a safe place for people to store their money and to help them get mortgages and own homes.

One of the founders James Walker Bain became the society's president for the next 30 years.

In 1995 the name of the bank officially changed to Southland Building Society and in 2008 to SBS Bank.

In 2010 Hastings Building Society (HBS) joined with SBS Bank and in November 2015 HBS Bank amalgamated with SBS Bank.

== Sponsorships ==
SBS Bank sponsors a wide range of local groups and clubs. These include Southland Sharks, Highlanders (rugby union), Stadium Southland, Invercargill Golf Club, Academy Southland, Southland Stags, Ronald McDonald House South Island and Invercargill Musical Theatre.

== Subsidiaries ==
SBS has a number of subsidiaries which together make up the SBS Group. Providing products from personal loans, to wealth management, insurance and KiwiSaver.

The Subsidiaries include, Finance Now (provides a wide range of personal lending, including car loans and Holiday Loans), SBS Insurance (offers house, contents, and car insurance as well as a range of personal insurance including life and income protection), and SBS Wealth (manages over $1.4 billion for more than 20,000 New Zealanders through providing Private Wealth services, the Lifestages KiwiSaver Scheme and the Lifestages Investment Funds).

== Management ==
=== List of CEOs ===
- Ross Smith (1992–2014)
- Wayne Evans (2014–2016)
