= James Whyte Kelly =

New Zealand politician

New Zealand Parliament
| Years | Term | Electorate | Party |
|---|---|---|---|
| 1890–1893 | 11th | Invercargill | Liberal–Labour |
| 1893–1896 | 12th | Invercargill | Liberal–Labour |
| 1896–1899 | 13th | Invercargill | Liberal–Labour |

James Whyte Kelly (1855 – 15 December 1938) was a 19th-century New Zealand politician, initially of the Liberal Party but later an Independent Liberal.

== Biography ==
Kelly was born in 1855 at Carluke, South Lanarkshire, Scotland. He became an orphan aged 14. He learned the trade of a tailor, and married Elizabeth Millar, the daughter of James Millar of Motherwell in Lanarkshire. The couple emigrated in 1875 on the Aldergrove to New Zealand, landing in Port Chalmers in Otago. They later moved south to Invercargill.

He represented the Invercargill electorate in the House of Representatives from 1890. He was in favour of land nationalisation and progressive taxes.

In 1895, he broke away from the Liberal Party and became an Independent Liberal. He was defeated in the 1899 election.

From 1892 to 1894, Kelly served as president of the federated New Zealand Workers' Union.

Kelly died on 15 December 1938.

New Zealand Parliament
| Preceded by Henry Feldwick | Member of Parliament for Invercargill; 1890–1899 | Succeeded by Josiah Hanan |
