= Vincent Ward (politician) =

New Zealand businessman and politician

The Honourable Vincent Ward CBE
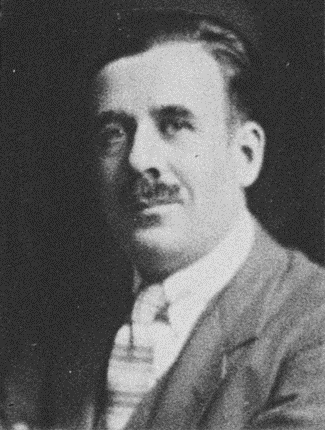

Member of the New Zealand Parliament for Invercargill
- In office 13 August 1930 – 2 December 1931
- Preceded by: Sir Joseph Ward
- Succeeded by: James Hargest

New Zealand Legislative Councillor
- In office 22 June 1934 – 9 February 1946†
- Appointed by: George Forbes

Personal details
- Born: Vincent Aubrey Ward; 4 January 1886 Bluff, New Zealand
- Died: 9 February 1946 (aged 60) New Zealand
- Party: United
- Spouse: Sybil Mary Petre (m. 1927)
- Relatives: Sir Joseph Ward (father); Joseph Ward (nephew); Francis Petre (brother-in-law); Henry William Petre (father-in-law)

Vincent Aubrey Ward CBE (4 January 1886 – 9 February 1946) was a New Zealand businessman, Member of Parliament and a Member of the Legislative Council.

== Biography ==
=== Early life ===
Born in Bluff in 1886, Ward was educated at the Bluff State Primary School and St. Patrick's College in Wellington. He was the second born son of future Prime Minister Sir Joseph Ward.

He found employment with the National Bank of New Zealand at Wellington before leaving for England in 1907 where he worked first with the merchant firm Messrs.' James Morrison and Son and then at the insurance branch of Lloyds Bank. In 1908, he travelled to New York, spending a period with the U.S. Steel corporation. Ward then left for Montreal in 1911 where he became joint manager of the New Zealand Shipping Company. During World War I, he served in the Motor Boat Patrol, gaining his commission in 1915 while Canada. After the war, he went to New York for the British Ministry of Shipping before returning to New Zealand in 1920. Upon his arrival in New Zealand, he moved to Christchurch and joined his father's firm, Messrs. J. G. Ward and Co. He married Sybil Mary Petre in 1927. She was the daughter of Robert G. Petre and granddaughter of Henry Petre. The architect Francis Petre was her uncle.

=== Political career ===
New Zealand Parliament
Years	Term	Electorate	Party
1930–1931	23rd	Invercargill	United

Ward first became involved in politics in 1922. He became his father's private secretary prior to the unsuccessful Tauranga by-election, before moving to Wellington after Sir Joseph re-entered Parliament in 1925. He remained as private secretary for the duration of Sir Joseph's second period as Prime Minister.

He replaced his father in the 13 August 1930 by-election for the parliamentary seat of Invercargill that was held after Sir Joseph died. He stood for the United Party, retaining the seat for the government. He retired from Parliament at the next general election in 1931.

He was subsequently appointed to the Legislative Council on 22 June 1934 by Sir Joseph's successor as Prime Minister, George Forbes. At the expiry of his first term, he was reappointed on 23 June 1941 by Peter Fraser. He served until his death on 9 February 1946.

In 1935, he was awarded the King George V Silver Jubilee Medal. In 1938 he unsuccessfully stood for the Wellington City Council on a Citizens' Association ticket.

=== Later life and death ===
In later life, Ward was director of several companies and also became secretary of the Wellington Metropolitan Patriotic Council in September 1940. He was appointed a Commander of the Order of the British Empire in the 1946 New Year Honours.

Ward died in Wellington on 9 February 1946, aged 60.

== Notes ==
New Zealand Parliament
Preceded by Sir Joseph Ward	Member of Parliament for Invercargill; 1930–1931	Succeeded by James Hargest
