= William Henderson Calder =

New Zealand politician

New Zealand Parliament
Years	Term	Electorate	Party
1871–1873	5th	Invercargill	Independent

William Henderson Calder was a 19th-century Member of Parliament in Invercargill, New Zealand.

He represented the Invercargill electorate in Parliament from 1871 to 1873, when he resigned.

New Zealand Parliament
Preceded by William Wood	Member of Parliament for Invercargill; 1871–1873	Succeeded by John Cuthbertson
