= Joseph Hatch =

New Zealand politician

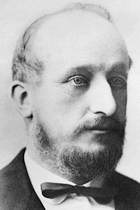

Member of the New Zealand Parliament for Invercargill
- In office 1884–1887

Personal details
- Born: 13 June 1837 London, England
- Died: 2 September 1928 Tasmania, Australia
- Party: Independent
- Occupation: Politician; businessman
- Known for: Harvesting penguins and elephant seals for their oil

Joseph Hatch (13 June 1837 – 2 September 1928) was a New Zealand politician who is best remembered for the harvesting of penguins and elephant seals for their oil on the sub-Antarctic Macquarie Island from 1890 to 1919. Around two million penguins were killed over nearly three decades. His company, J. Hatch & Co., was based in Invercargill, New Zealand, and then Hobart, Tasmania, where he is buried.

== Early life ==
Hatch was born in London, England, in 1837, the son of a furrier and staunch Baptist, and was a qualified chemist (pharmacist). He received an early education from his uncle, a Baptist minister. He became a printer's apprentice and in 1856 left Liverpool aboard the 'Eagle Speed', arriving in Melbourne, Australia, in March 1857. There he found employment with the wholesale druggists Youngman, McCann and Company. In 1862 the firm sent him to Dunedin, New Zealand, to advise on establishing a branch there. After completing this assignment, Hatch chose to remain in New Zealand and subsequently entered into partnership with J. D. Hayes as a druggist in Invercargill.

== Political career ==
New Zealand Parliament
Years	Term	Electorate	Party
1884–1887	9th	Invercargill	Independent

In Invercargill, he became a Councillor in 1876. He was Mayor of Invercargill in 1877–1878. He was the Member of Parliament for Invercargill from 1884 to 1887, when he was defeated by a previous holder of the position, Henry Feldwick. His oil factor trade was controversial even then, although he was an entertaining speaker and debater. He stood in the Invercargill electorate once more in the 1893 election but was defeated by the incumbent, James Whyte Kelly.

== Oil trade ==
The Dunedin firm of Elder and Co had pioneered the sea elephant oiling industry on Macquarie Island from 1878 to 1884. Hatch's gang started with sea elephant bulls in 1887, but in 1889 with fewer bulls and the Norwegian development of a steam-pressure digestor which could extract oil from meat and bone as well as blubber and from smaller animals like penguins, Hatch realised the financial potential from harvesting the penguins on Macquarie Island. Of the four species of penguin on the island (rockhopper, king, royal and gentoo) the royal penguin was mainly used. Eventually, oiling plants were established at Lusitania Bay, South East Bay, The Nuggets, Hasselborough Bay and Bauer Bay.

Hatch had a legal dispute with his captain, Jacob Eckhoff, over his ship, and there were three shipwrecks around the island (Gratitude, 1898; Clyde and Jessie Nichol 1910) with 20 deaths. The New Zealand Government was restricting the seal killing season from 1875, although Macquarie Island was unclaimed. By 1919 objections culminated in perhaps the first-ever international campaign to preserve wildlife, with Antarctic explorers like Douglas Mawson, Frank Hurley and Apsley Cherry-Garrard, supported by H. G. Wells in his story The Undying Fire and Baron Walter Rothschild.

Hatch had supporters in New Zealand as well, including his fellow Southland politician Sir Joseph Ward and the Tasmanian state government in Australia. He got a seven-year oiling lease from the Tasmanian state government in 1905, and in 1912 the headquarters was moved to Hobart, Tasmania. In 1915, a new company, Southern Isles Exploitation Co., was established but by 1919 the Tasmanian government would extend the lease only for a year. In 1922 Hatch was a Nationalist candidate for the state seat of Denison, but he was not elected. By 1926, the company had collapsed, and Hatch lost his properties in Invercargill and Hobart.

== Family and death ==
He married Sarah Annie Wilson in Melbourne, Australia, in 1869. They had three daughters and four sons. Hatch continued travelling frequently between Australia and New Zealand well into his 80s – as late as 1922 standing for Parliament in Tasmania and being described as "constantly on the move between New Zealand, Australia and Tasmania in the pursuit of business". Hatch died in Hobart in 1928, aged 91.

Political offices
Preceded by John Cuthbertson	Mayor of Invercargill; 1877–1878	Succeeded by George Lumsden
New Zealand Parliament
Preceded by Henry Feldwick	Member of Parliament for Invercargill; 1884–1887	Succeeded by Henry Feldwick
