= William Wood (politician, born 1827) =

19th-century New Zealand politician

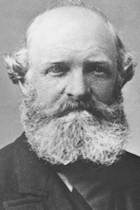
William Wood

William Wood (1827 – 30 August 1884) was a 19th-century New Zealand politician.

== Biography ==
New Zealand Parliament
Years	Term	Electorate	Party
1866–1870	4th	Invercargill	Independent
1876–1878	6th	Mataura	Independent

He represented the Invercargill electorate in Parliament from 1866 to 1870, when he retired, and then the Mataura electorate from 1876 to 1878, when he resigned.

He was the third and last Superintendent of the Southland Province in 1869–1870. He was the first mayor of Invercargill in 1871–1873.

He was a member of the New Zealand Legislative Council from 1878 until his death in 1884.

Political offices
Preceded by John Parkin Taylor	Superintendent of Southland Province; 1869–1870	Reunited with Otago Province
First	Mayor of Invercargill; 1871–1873	Succeeded by George Lumsden
New Zealand Parliament
New constituency	Member of Parliament for Invercargill; 1866–1870	Succeeded by William Henderson Calder
Preceded by Dillon Bell	Member of Parliament for Mataura; 1876–1878	Succeeded by James Shanks
