= James Walker Bain =

New Zealand politician

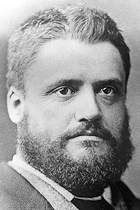
James Walker Bain

James Walker Bain (1841 – 29 September 1899) was a 19th-century New Zealand politician and founder of SBS Bank. He was a significant businessman in Invercargill and Southland.

Bain was born in Edinburgh, Scotland, in 1841. His parents were the spirit merchant John Bain and his wife, Elizabeth Middlemass. He received his education at the Free Church Normal School and then at a private academy. He started with the printing company Oliver and Boyd and learned the trade of a compositor.

He arrived in Port Chalmers in New Zealand, Otago's harbour, on 23 September 1858 on the Jura from Glasgow. His parents, five sisters and one brother arrived in Otago on the Gloucester three months later; one of his sisters was Wilhelmina Sherriff Bain. He initially worked for the Otago Witness before going to Auckland for two years. He moved to Invercargill at the beginning of 1861. Together with George Smallfield, he founded Invercargill's first newspaper, the Southland News and Foveaux Straits Herald, and its first edition was published on 14 February 1861. The paper later became the Southland Daily News and existed until 1967, when it was bought by the rival The Southland Times. Bain founded the Mataura Paper Mill in 1875. He was a significant businessman in Invercargill, was president of the Southland Building Society for the first 30 years of its existence. He was a member of the Southland Education Board for many years, and was at times its chairman.

New Zealand Parliament
Years	Term	Electorate	Party
1879–1881	7th	Invercargill	Independent

He represented the Invercargill electorate in Parliament from 1879 to 1881, when he retired. He was Mayor of Invercargill in 1891–1892.

Bain died unexpectedly on the morning of 29 September 1899 after falling ill on 26 September. He was buried at St. John's Cemetery in Invercargill.

Political offices
Preceded by William Horatio Hall	Mayor of Invercargill; 1891–1892	Succeeded by Duncan McFarlane
New Zealand Parliament
Preceded by Henry Feldwick	Member of Parliament for Invercargill; 1879–1881	Succeeded by Henry Feldwick
