= John Cuthbertson (politician) =

New Zealand politician

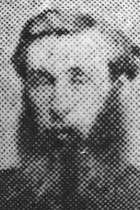
John Robert Cuthbertson

New Zealand Parliament
Years	Term	Electorate	Party
1873–1875	5th	Invercargill	Independent

John Robert Cuthbertson (1834–1882) was a 19th-century New Zealand politician.

He represented the Invercargill electorate in Parliament from 1873 to 1875, when he was defeated. He was Mayor of Invercargill in 1876–1877.

Political offices
Preceded by John Walker Mitchell	Mayor of Invercargill; 1876–1877	Succeeded by Joseph Hatch
New Zealand Parliament
Preceded by William Henderson Calder	Member of Parliament for Invercargill; 1873–1875	Succeeded by George Lumsden
