= George Lumsden =

New Zealand politician

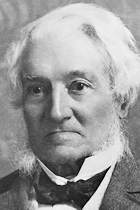

Mayor of Invercargill
- In office 1873–1874
- In office 1878–1879

Personal details
- Born: 12 March 1815 Fife, Scotland
- Died: 11 February 1904 (aged 88)
- Spouse: Christina Anderson (m. 1842)
- Children: 8

George Lumsden (12 March 1815 – 11 February 1904) was a 19th-century New Zealand politician.

== Biography ==
New Zealand Parliament
Years	Term	Electorate	Party
1875–1878	6th	Invercargill	Independent

Lumsden was born in Fife, Scotland, in 1815. He learned the trade of watchmaker from his uncle at Pittenweem. Lumsden and his wife Christina (née Anderson, married 1842) emigrated to Geelong, Australia, in 1858 on the Ravenseraig. He joined the gold rush in Ballarat, but returned to his watchmakers shop in Geelong. In 1861, they moved to Invercargill.

He was Mayor of Invercargill in 1873–1874 and again in 1878–1879. He represented the Invercargill electorate in Parliament from 1875 to 1878, when he resigned, as absence from his jewellery shop was affecting his business.

The Lumsdens had eight children. Their son Thomas James Lumsden was born in 1854.

Political offices
Preceded by William Wood	Mayor of Invercargill; 1873–1874; 1878–1879	Succeeded by Thomas Pratt
Preceded by Joseph Hatch	Mayor of Invercargill; 1873–1874; 1878–1879	Succeeded by George Goodwillie
New Zealand Parliament
Preceded by John Cuthbertson	Member of Parliament for Invercargill; 1875–1878	Succeeded by Henry Feldwick
