= Opinion polling for the 1993 New Zealand general election =

Opinion polling for elections

Opinion polling was commissioned throughout the duration of the 43rd New Zealand Parliament in the lead up to the 1993 election by various research organisations.

== Graphical summary ==
Local regression of polls conducted

== Individual polls ==
Polls are listed in the table below in chronological order. Refusals are generally excluded from the party vote percentages, while question wording and the treatment of "don't know" responses and those not intending to vote may vary between survey firms.

Unless otherwise noted the information is sourced from here:

Poll	Date (Note: These are the survey dates of the poll, or if the survey dates are not stated, the date the poll was released.)	Labour	National	Alliance	NZ First	NewLabour	Social Credit
1990 election result	27 Oct 1990	35.14	47.82	–	–	5.16	0.98
TVNZ Heylen	8 Dec 1990	32	50	–	–	5	1
TVNZ Heylen	2 Feb 1991	38	46	–	–	4	2
TVNZ Heylen	9 Mar 1991	40	43	–	–	6	1
TVNZ Heylen	6 Apr 1991	42	36	–	–	6	1
TVNZ Heylen	6 May 1991	43	39	–	–	7	2
TVNZ Heylen	8 Jun 1991	42	35	–	–	7	3
TVNZ Heylen	6 July 1991	45	37	–	–	6	3
30 July 1991 – The controversial Mother of all Budgets was delivered by the government
TVNZ Heylen	3 Aug 1991	43	34	–	–	9	1
TVNZ Heylen	31 Aug 1991	47	27	–	–	9	3
TVNZ Heylen	21 Sep 1991	42	22	–	–	11	1
TVNZ Heylen	19 Oct 1991	43	30	–	–	8	2
TVNZ Heylen	23 Nov 1991	41	24	10	–	9	2
1 December 1991 – The Alliance party was formally launched
TVNZ Heylen	7 Dec 1991	36	26	21	–	6	1
TVNZ Heylen	1 Feb 1992	38	26	18	–	5	2
15 February 1992 – National narrowly wins the Tamaki by-election after Sir Robert Muldoon's resignation.
TVNZ Heylen	7 Mar 1992	36	32	16	–	4	0
TVNZ Heylen	4 Apr 1992	39	31	10	–	4	3
TVNZ Heylen	29 Apr 1992	42	34	10	–	3	2
TVNZ Heylen	6 Jun 1992	42	33	21	–	–	1
TVNZ Heylen	3 Jul 1992	37	37	24	–	–	0
TVNZ Heylen	8 Aug 1992	41	36	20	–	–	1
TVNZ Heylen	5 Sep 1992	39	34	26	–	–	–
TVNZ Heylen	3 Oct 1992	42	30	27	–	–	–
TVNZ Heylen	7 Nov 1992	40	30	28	–	–	–
TVNZ Heylen	5 Dec 1992	36	29	33	–	–	–
12 December 1992 – Labour wins the Wellington Central by-election after Fran Wilde's resignation.
TVNZ Heylen	6 Feb 1993	43	33	22	–	–	–
TVNZ Heylen	6 Mar 1993	46	28	22	–	–	–
TVNZ Heylen	3 Apr 1993	48	30	19	–	–	–
17 April 1993 – Winston Peters wins the Tauranga by-election as an independent candidate after resigning from both his party and his seat.
TVNZ Heylen	1 May 1993	45	29	21	–	–	–
TVNZ Heylen	29 May 1993	40	29	26	–	–	–
TVNZ Heylen	3 Jul 1993	35	37	21	–	–	–
18 July 1993 – Peters founds the New Zealand First party and is joined by another former National MP Gilbert Myles.
TVNZ Heylen	19 Jul 1993	33	40	11	12	–	–
TVNZ Heylen	8 Aug 1993	33	41	10	15	–	–
TVNZ Heylen	4 Sep 1993	36	39	11	11	–	–
TVNZ Heylen	2 Oct 1993	37	37	13	12	–	–
TVNZ Heylen	17 Oct 1993	34	38	16	10	–	–
TVNZ Heylen	31 Oct 1993	32	39	17	9	–	–
1993 election result	6 Nov 1993	34.68	35.05	18.21	8.40	–	–

== See also ==
- 1993 New Zealand general election
- Politics of New Zealand
