= New Zealand First =

Right-wing populist New Zealand political party

- Abbreviation: NZ First; NZF
- Leader: Winston Peters
- President: Julian Paul
- Secretary: Holly Howard
- Deputy Leader: Shane Jones
- Founded: 18 July 1993; 33 years ago
- Split from: National Party
- Ideology: Right-wing populism; Nationalism; Social conservatism
- Colours: Black; Navy blue; Gold
- House of Representatives: 8 / 123

Website
- www.nzfirst.nz

New Zealand First, commonly abbreviated to NZ First or NZF, is a right-wing populist political party in New Zealand, founded and led by Winston Peters, who has served three times as deputy prime minister. The party has participated in coalition governments with the New Zealand National Party from 1996 to 1998 and from 2023 to the present, and with the New Zealand Labour Party from 2017 to 2020. From 2005 to 2008, it supported a Labour-led government through a confidence-and-supply agreement. New Zealand First currently serves in a coalition government with both National and ACT New Zealand as part of the Sixth National government, having won 6.08% of the total party vote in the 2023 New Zealand general election.

New Zealand First was formed shortly before the 1993 New Zealand general election, following the resignation of Winston Peters as the National Party MP for Tauranga after criticising the party's neoliberal economic policies. The party gained support from National Party and Labour voters alike disenchanted with the support of both parties for extensive deregulation. New Zealand First entered the New Zealand House of Representatives shortly after its formation. The party had 17 members of parliament (MPs) at its peak, following the 1996 New Zealand general election, the first to use mixed-member proportional representation. That election the party swept the Māori seats, leading to the "Tight Five" of New Zealand First MPs from those electorates. The party had gained considerable support among socially conservative Māori voters, an association still visible today. By the end of their first term, however, the New Zealand First caucus had fallen to nine MPs due to internal conflict over the coalition government with the National Party.

After agreeing a confidence and supply with Labour in 2005, the party left parliament following the 2008 New Zealand general election in which it failed to gain enough party votes to retain seats. However, in the 2011 New Zealand general election, New Zealand First gained 6.59% of the total party vote, entitling it to eight MPs. The party increased its number of MPs to eleven at the 2014 New Zealand general election. During the 2017 election, the party's number of MPs dropped to nine members. In the weeks following the 2017 election, New Zealand First formed a coalition government with the Labour Party. In the 2020 election New Zealand First's share of the party vote fell to 2.6%, with all incumbent MPs, including Peters, losing their seats in Parliament. The party returned to parliament in 2023.

New Zealand First distinguishes itself from the mainstream political establishment through its use of populist rhetoric, and supports binding referendums on major social and political issues. They are also the only party since the introduction of MMP to have formed governments with both National and Labour.

== History ==
=== Foundation ===
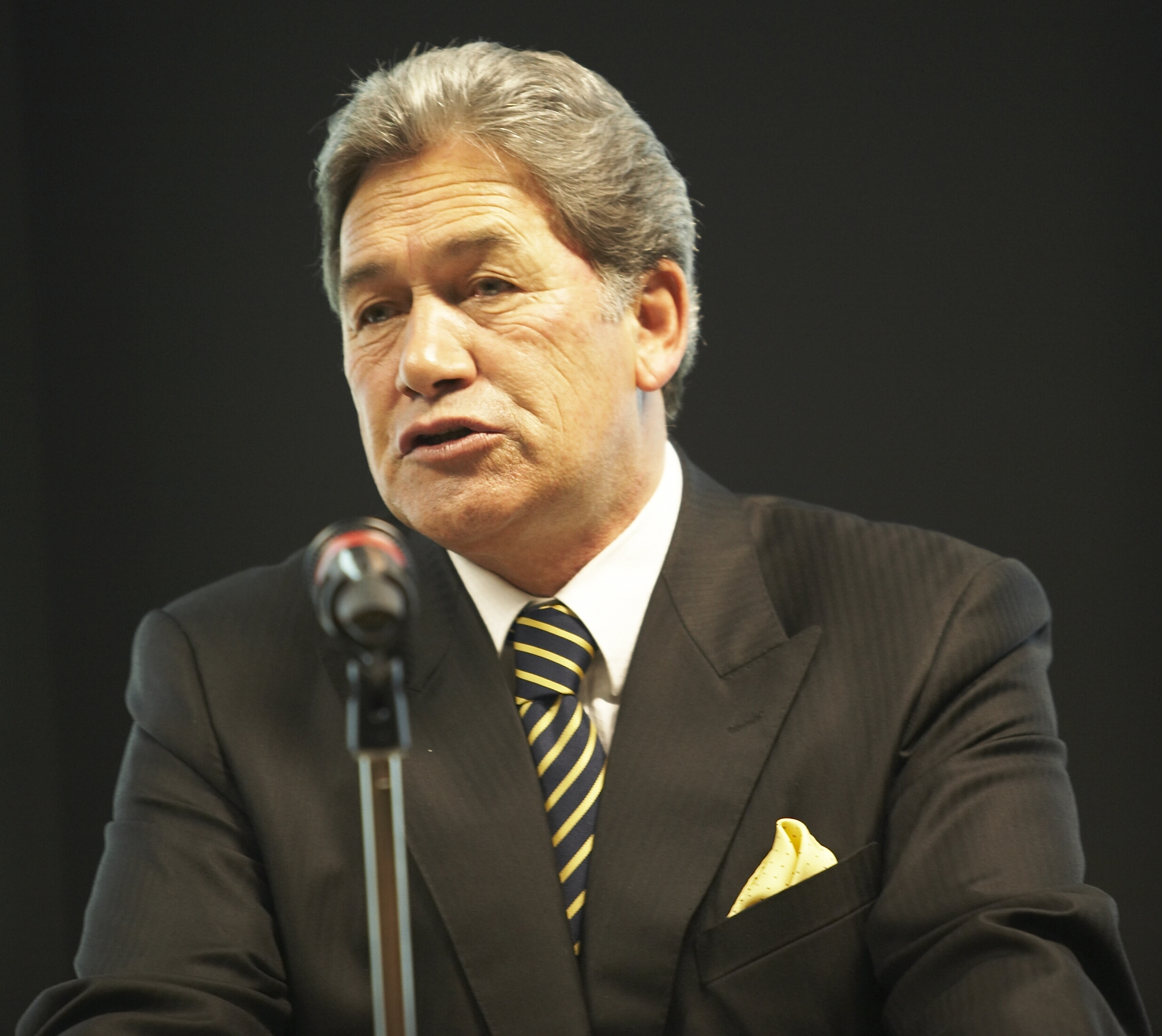
Winston Peters founded the party in 1993

In June 1992, Winston Peters, a former Minister of Māori Affairs in the National Party government of Jim Bolger, was told that he would not be allowed to run for another term as National Party Member of Parliament for Tauranga in the 1993 election. Peters had previously been dismissed from the Cabinet in 1991, after he publicly criticised National's economic policy, colloquially dubbed Ruthanasia. Spearheaded by Minister of Finance Ruth Richardson, National arguably had gone beyond the extensive deregulation started by the New Zealand Labour Party in the 1980s, enacting widespread austerity and slashing benefits in the Mother of All Budgets of 1991. The budget cut spending on many of the welfare state institutions established in the 1930s by the First Labour Government. The unemployment benefit was cut by $14.00 a week, sickness benefit by $27.04, families benefit by $25.00 to $27.00 and universal payments for family benefits were completely abolished. After the death of protectionist former Prime Minister Robert Muldoon – who resigned from his Tamaki constituency in protest – Peters became Ruthanasia's leading opponents, and National's most prominent dissenter.

By late 1991, the National Party had become the most unpopular governing party since the Great Depression, with one poll result putting them as low as 22%. After his sacking, Peters decided to capitalise on National's unpopularity. On 19 March 1993, Peters resigned from the National Party. He also resigned from Parliament, triggering a by-election in his electorate on 17 April 1993 in which he stood as an independent, winning with 90.8% of votes due to neither Labour nor National running a candidate. On 18 July 1993, shortly before the writs were issued for that year's general election, Peters formed New Zealand First as a political grouping. At the time of its formation, New Zealand First's policy platform was broadly conservative and reactionary in that it opposed both Labour and National, the major centre-left and centre-right parties respectively. Peters claimed to be reviving National policies from which the Bolger government had departed.

Variably dubbed a social conservative, economic nationalist, or right-wing populist, Peters' rise was fuelled by the enormous financial changes New Zealand underwent during the 1980s and 90s, during which time the economy was thoroughly deregulated by both the Labour Party and the National Party. A fierce opponent of both neoliberalism and progressivism, Peters gained support from both National Party and Labour voters disenchanted with the support of both parties for economic liberalisation. As Peters was a Māori conservative, he gained strong support particularly from socially conservative Māori voters who had voted Labour consistently until they began enforcing neoliberal policies, colloquially called Rogernomics. The party was soon widely regarded as having a distinct Māori character or even being "pro-Māori".

=== 1993 general election ===
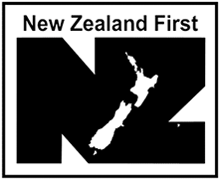
Original party logo (1993–2017)

In the April 1993 special by-election, Tauranga voters re-elected Peters as an independent. At the general election six months later, New Zealand First received 8.4% of the total vote. Peters easily retained Tauranga, and Tau Henare, another New Zealand First candidate, won the Northern Māori seat, giving the party a total of two MPs. This did much to counter the perception of New Zealand First as merely a personality-driven vehicle for Peters.

=== 1996 general election ===
With the switch to the mixed-member proportional (MMP) electoral system for the 1996 election, smaller parties could gain a share of seats proportional to their share of the vote. Before the election, New Zealand First was polling unprecedentedly highly due to the popularity of its leader, Winston Peters. At its peak, New Zealand First was polling at 29% support on 16 May 1996.

This enabled New Zealand First to win 13% of the vote and 17 seats, including all five Māori electorates. New Zealand First's five Māori MPs—Tau Henare (the party's deputy leader), Tuku Morgan, Rana Waitai, Tu Wyllie and Tuariki Delamere—became known as the "Tight Five".

The election result put New Zealand First in a powerful position just three years after its formation. Neither of the two traditional major parties (National and Labour) had enough seats to govern alone, and only New Zealand First had enough seats to become a realistic coalition partner for either. This placed the relatively new party in a position where it was the kingmaker, a position which allowed the party to effectively choose the next Prime Minister of New Zealand.

New Zealand First entered into negotiations with both major parties. Before the election, most people (including many New Zealand First voters) had expected Peters to enter into coalition with Labour. In fact, he harshly attacked his former National colleagues during the campaign, and appeared to promise that he would not even consider going into coalition with them.

=== Coalition with National: 1996–1998 ===
To the surprise of the electorate, which had apparently voted for New Zealand First to get rid of National, New Zealand First decided to enter a coalition with National, enabling and becoming part of the third term of the fourth National government. The most common explanation for this decision involved National's willingness to accept New Zealand First's demands (and/or Labour's refusal to do so). However, Michael Laws (a former National Party MP who served as a New Zealand First campaign manager) claims that Peters had secretly decided to go with National significantly before this time, and that he merely used negotiations with Labour to encourage more concessions from National.

Whatever the case, New Zealand First exacted a high price from Bolger in return for allowing him to stay in power. Under the terms of a detailed coalition agreement, Peters would serve as Deputy Prime Minister, and would also hold the specially created office of Treasurer (senior to the Minister of Finance). National also made considerable concessions on policy. Unusually for a junior coalition partner in a Westminster system (especially one as new as New Zealand First), Peters was free to select the ministers from his own party, without Bolger's oversight.

New Zealand First had a relatively smooth coalition relationship with National at first. Despite early concerns about the ability of Peters to work with Bolger, who had sacked him from cabinet during his time as Minister of Māori Affairs in 1991, the two did not have major problems. New Zealand First had graver concerns about the behaviour of some of its MPs. A particularly damaging scandal involved Tuku Morgan, which consisted of him allegedly spending $4000 in public funds on clothing, though the Serious Fraud Office later did not find him guilty of fraud.

Gradually, however, the coalition tensions became more significant than problems of party discipline. This became increasingly the case after Transport Minister Jenny Shipley gained enough support within the National party room to force Bolger's resignation and to subsequently become New Zealand's first woman Prime Minister on 8 December 1997. The tensions between the two parties also rose as New Zealand First adopted a more aggressive approach to promoting its policies (including those National would not implement). This new attitude probably fed off New Zealand First's poor performance in opinion polls, which (to Peters) indicated that the party's success rested on its confrontational style. Many commentators believe that Peters performs better in opposition than in government.

=== Return to opposition ===
On 14 August 1998, Shipley sacked Peters from Cabinet. This occurred after an ongoing dispute about the sale of the government's stake in Wellington International Airport, directly in conflict with New Zealand First's general commitment to not sell off state assets.

Peters immediately tore up the coalition agreement. However, several other MPs, unwilling to follow Peters into opposition and wanting to continue to support a National-led government, tried to replace Peters as Leader of New Zealand First with Tau Henare, the then-Deputy Leader. This caucus-room coup failed, and Henare eventually led four other New Zealand First MPs in forming a new party, Mauri Pacific, which was a self-proclaimed multicultural party. Three others established themselves as independents. All eight departing MPs continued to support a National-led minority government. Many of these MPs had come under public scrutiny for their behaviour. Until the dissolution of Parliament in 1999, they provided Shipley with enough parliamentary support to stay in government without New Zealand First.

=== 1999 general election ===
In the 1999 election New Zealand First lost much of its support, receiving only 4% of the party vote. Some voters had not forgiven Peters for forming a coalition with National after being led to believe that a vote for him would help get rid of National, and others likely changed their vote due to the instability within the party's ranks. Whatever the case, New Zealand First's support tailed off enough that it was nearly ejected from parliament. Under New Zealand's MMP system, a party must either win an electorate seat or 5% of the vote to qualify for list seats. Peters held his Tauranga electorate by a mere 63 votes after losing almost 20 percent of his vote from 1996, and New Zealand First received five seats in total.

=== 2002 general election ===
By the 2002 New Zealand general election, however, the party had rebuilt much of its support. This occurred largely because of Peters' three-point campaign for sensible immigration, scrutinising Treaty costs, and reducing crime. The party won 10.38% of the vote, which was a considerable improvement on its previous performance (although not as good as its performance in 1996), and New Zealand First won thirteen seats in parliament. Peters' campaign slogan "Can We Fix It? Yes We Can" attracted much media attention, as the same line appears in theme music for the children's television programme Bob the Builder. Party activists stated they were unaware the chant came from a children's cartoon. In the end, New Zealand First gained 8 seats in Parliament after the election, earning 13 MPs in total (including 1 electorate MP): Winston Peters, Peter Brown, Brian Donnelly, Ron Mark, Doug Woolerton, Barbara Stewart, Pita Paraone, Craig McNair, Jim Peters, Dail Jones, Edwin Perry, Bill Gudgeon, and Brent Catchpole.

It appears that New Zealand First had hoped to play in 2002 a similar role to the one it had in 1996, where it found itself able to give power to either Labour or National depending on which offered the best deal. However, National's support, under the leadership of future Prime Minister Bill English, had collapsed to its worst result in the party's history, to the extent that it could not form a government even with New Zealand First's support, depriving the party of its hoped kingmaker position. In the end, however, this proved irrelevant, as Labour refused to consider an alliance with New Zealand First in any case. Instead, Labour relied on support from the newly significant United Future.

After the 2002 election, in light of National's decreased strength, New Zealand First attempted to gain more prominence in Opposition, frequently attacking the Labour-led Coalition government on a wide range of issues. Speculation has occurred on efforts to create a more united front linking New Zealand First, the New Zealand National Party, and ACT New Zealand, but Peters has rejected this scenario, saying that the New Zealand voters will decide what alliances are necessary. Unlike the classical-liberal ACT New Zealand, which portrays itself as a natural coalition partner for the New Zealand National Party, New Zealand First welcomed the potential for a coalition government with any parliamentary political party.

For a period in early 2004 New Zealand First experienced a brief decline in the polls after Don Brash became leader of the National Party, a change which hugely revived National's fortunes after the controversial but highly popular Orewa Speech. The votes that had apparently switched to New Zealand First from National seemed to return to support Don Brash, and many commentators predicted that New Zealand First would lose a number of its seats in the next election. By 2005, however, the proportions had changed again, and as the campaign for the September 2005 election got under way, New Zealand First had again reached the 10% mark in opinion polling for the 2005 election.

Pre-election polls put New Zealand First ahead of the other minor parties. Some thought it likely that in the event of a National minority or plurality, unless ACT's fortunes dramatically improved, Don Brash would have to form a second coalition or seek a support agreement with New Zealand First to be able to form a government. Peters promised to support the party that won the most seats, or at least abstain in no-confidence motions against it. However, he also said he would not support any government that included the Greens within Cabinet.

=== Confidence and supply with Labour: 2005–2008 ===
In the 2005 election, NZF lost much of its support. Though it remained the third-largest party in the House, New Zealand First took only 5.72% of the vote, a considerable loss from 2002, and just enough to cross the MMP proportionality quota of 5%. In addition, Peters narrowly lost his previously safe constituency seat of Tauranga by 730 votes to National's Bob Clarkson, and became a list MP. New Zealand First lost six seats in Parliament, earning 7 MPs, all elected on the party list: Winston Peters, Peter Brown, Dail Jones, Ron Mark, Doug Woolerton, Barbara Stewart and Pita Paraone.

Following the 2005 election, New Zealand First agreed to a supply-and-confidence agreement with the New Zealand Labour Party (along with United Future) in return for policy concessions including the SuperGold Card and the portfolio of Foreign Affairs outside Cabinet for Winston Peters. Peters becoming Minister of Foreign Affairs detected a change in his attitude since Peters' "Rotorua speech" on 7 September 2005 at a public address at the Rotorua Convention Centre had spoken of New Zealand First sitting on the cross-benches (and thus staying out of government) and eschewing "the baubles of office". Peters' coalition partnership with the centre-left Labour Party was in spite of his increasingly right-wing populist rhetoric around emigration from Asia (which was at odds with Labour's policies). Peters has previously warned of an "Asian invasion" of Asian migrants (against the evidence suggested by statistical trends). In 2005 he called New Zealand "the last Asian colony", and referred to Asian immigration as an “imported criminal activity” that would cause "chaos" to race relations.

Soon after the 2005 New Zealand general election, Winston Peters launched a legal challenge against Bob Clarkson, alleging that he had spent more than the legal limit allowed for campaign budgets during elections in New Zealand. This legal bid failed, with a majority of the judges in the case declaring that Bob Clarkson had not overspent during the campaign for the Tauranga electorate. In the 2005 election funding controversy, the Auditor-General found that all the parties in parliament except the Progressive Party had misspent parliamentary funding. New Zealand First was the only party that did not repay the misspent funding.

New Zealand First achieved many policy initiatives during this term, most notably the introduction of the SuperGold Card, a policy which was unpopular among many political leaders due to its high cost. The SuperGold Card was targeted towards seniors, and included free off-peak travel, and discounts from thousands of New Zealand businesses. As Minister of Foreign Affairs, Minister for Racing and Associate Minister for Senior Citizens, Peters secured additional funding for "New Zealand to expand its international presence" in the 2007 budget, as well as in the 2008 budget additional benefits for SuperGold Card holders including funding for hearing aids, investments into the Pacific Cooperation Foundation and Asia-New Zealand Foundation, additional funding for prize money in the racing industry totalling $9m, and a large funding increase for the Ministry of Foreign Affairs and Trade once again.

As Minister of Foreign Affairs, Winston Peters' most notable actions included a diplomatic mission to Papua New Guinea and meeting with United States Secretary of State Condoleezza Rice.

=== 2008 general election ===
In the months before the 2008 general election, New Zealand First became embroiled in a dispute over donations to the party from billionaire Owen Glenn, the Vela family and Bob Jones. This resulted in an investigation into party finances by the Serious Fraud Office on 28 August 2008 and an investigation into Peters by the Privileges Committee. On 29 August 2008 Peters stood down from his ministerial roles after significant pressure, while the investigations by the Serious Fraud Office and Privileges Committee proceeded. Although the Serious Fraud Office and the police found that Peters was not guilty of any wrongdoing, the Privileges Committee decided that Peters knowingly misled Parliament by not declaring the donation, and censured Peters, which he called a "useless facade." The whole scandal harmed New Zealand First's polling in the lead-up to the election, and is widely attributed to its defeat.

During the scandal, Leader of the Opposition John Key took the opportunity to rule out working with Peters and New Zealand First, which likely contributed further to the party's defeat. As expected, Prime Minister Helen Clark did not rule out working with New Zealand First.

On election night it was clear that Peters had not regained the Tauranga seat after his last loss of the electorate in the 2005 election and, with 4% of party votes, had not met the 5% threshold needed for parties to be elected without an electorate seat. In what some journalists described as a 'gracious' concession speech, Peters said that 'it's not over yet. We'll reorganise ourselves in the next few months. And we'll see what 2011 might hold for all us [sic].''

At a post-election meeting held to discuss the party's future in February 2009, long-serving Deputy Leader Peter Brown stepped down.

=== 2011 general election ===
At the beginning of the election campaign New Zealand First was polling at around 2% in most major polls and was effectively written off by most political commentators. Prime Minister John Key had once again ruled out working with Peters and New Zealand First, however then Leader of the Opposition Phil Goff had stated he was open to working with New Zealand First post-election provided they made it back into Parliament.

Peters received a significant amount of media attention towards the end of the campaign at the height of the Tea Tape scandal which arose during the campaign. Peters had criticised the arrangement in the seat of Epsom between National and ACT in which National encouraged its supporters to vote for the ACT candidate for their electorate MP. He railed against National for alleged negative remarks made about the then ACT leader Don Brash and New Zealand First's elderly supporters.

Peters appeared on a TVNZ minor parties leaders debate and won the debate convincingly in the subsequent text poll, with a plurality of 36% of the respondents saying Peters had won.

New Zealand First won 6.6% of the party vote on election night. Many political experts credit the Tea tape scandal for the re-entry of New Zealand First into Parliament; however, Peters himself credits the return to Parliament to the hard work undertaken by the Party over the three years it was not represented in Parliament.

In 2012 the party sacked MP Brendan Horan after allegations he stole money from his dying mother to gamble.

=== 2014 general election ===
New Zealand First 2014 general election results by electorate

In 2012, New Zealand First stated their intent to work in coalition with parties that would buy the privatised state assets back after the 2014 general election.

New Zealand First entered the 2014 general election campaign without providing a clear indication as to their coalition preferences. However, Peters did raise late in the campaign the prospect of a Labour-New Zealand First coalition or confidence and supply arrangement, and express some respect for the National Party, in particular the Finance Minister Bill English.

New Zealand First increased its party vote to 8.66% at the election, which took the party's representation in Parliament to 11 seats. Peters was highly critical of the conduct of the Labour and Green parties, who he blamed for the Opposition's loss.

In 2015 Peters contested the Northland by-election, which was held as a result of the resignation of the incumbent Mike Sabin on 30 January 2015 amid allegations of assault. Peters won the traditionally safe National seat with a majority of 4,441 over the National candidate Mark Osborne. It was the first time a New Zealand First MP held an electorate seat since Peters lost Tauranga in 2005. The win also resulted in New Zealand First acquiring a new List MP, Ria Bond, which increased the party's parliamentary representation to 12 seats.

On 3 July 2015 Ron Mark was elected Deputy Leader of New Zealand First, replacing Tracey Martin who had held the post since 2013.

=== 2017 general election ===
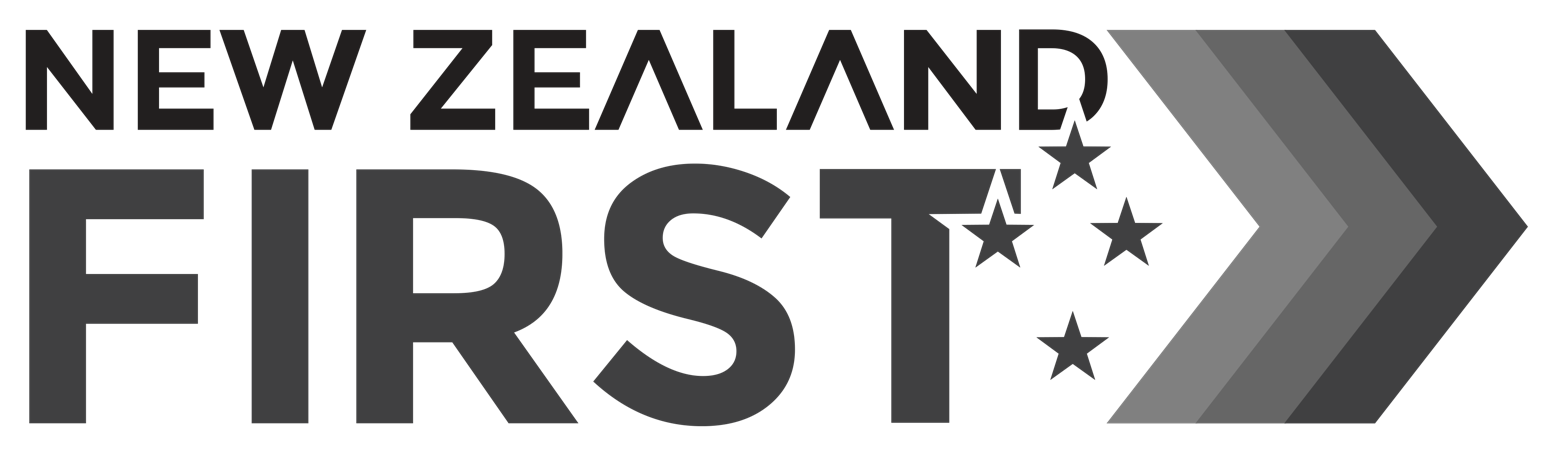
A Fresh Face, logo introduced in 2017

Peters has said that he will continue on as the Leader of New Zealand First. New Zealand First launched its campaign in Palmerston North on 25 June 2017. Policies include ring-fencing GST to the regions it is collected from and writing off student loans of people willing to work outside major centres, and recruiting 1,800 extra police officers. New Zealand First is also campaigning on increasing the minimum wage to $17. They would later increase it to $20. On 28 June 2017, New Zealand First changed their logo that they have used since its formation in 1993, giving the new design the name "A Fresh Face".

In early July 2017, the Green Party co-leader Metiria Turei criticised New Zealand First for its alleged racist attitude towards immigration. Her criticism was echoed by fellow Green MP Barry Coates, who claimed that the Greens would call for a snap election in response to a Labour–New Zealand First coalition government. In response, Peters and Deputy Leader Tracey Martin warned that Turei and Coates' comments could affect post-election negotiations between the two parties. Though Turei did not apologise for her remarks, Greens co-leader James Shaw later clarified that Coates' statement did not represent official Green Party policy.

During the party's convention in South Auckland on 16 July, Peters vowed that a New Zealand First government would hold two binding referendums on whether Maori electorates should be abolished and whether the number of MPs should be reduced to 100. Other New Zealand First policies included reducing immigration to 10,000 a year (from 72,300 in the June 2017 year), and bringing the country's banks back into Kiwi ownership, starting with making Kiwibank the New Zealand government's official trading bank.

During the 2017 general election, New Zealand First's share of the vote dropped to 7.2% with the party's representation in Parliament being reduced to 9 MPs. Under Peters' leadership, New Zealand First entered into talks to form coalitions with the National Party and the Labour Party. National Party leader and caretaker Prime Minister Bill English signalled an interest in forming a coalition with New Zealand First, while Labour leader Jacinda Ardern considered a three-way coalition with New Zealand First and the Greens. Peters stated that he would not make his final decision until the special votes results were released on 7 October 2017. During negotiations with Ardern, Peters indicated that he would be willing to consider dropping his call for a referendum on abolishing the Māori electorates in return for forming a coalition with Labour; a bone of contention in New Zealand race relations.

=== Coalition with Labour: 2017–2020 ===
On 19 October, Labour and New Zealand First decided to form a coalition government and a confidence and supply agreement with the Green Party. On 26 October, Peters was appointed Deputy Prime Minister, Minister of Foreign Affairs, Minister for State-owned enterprises, and Minister for Racing. Deputy Leader Ron Mark was given the Minister of Defence and Veterans portfolios. Tracey Martin was given the Children, Internal Affairs, and Senior Citizens portfolios as well as being made Associate Minister of Education. Shane Jones was made Minister of Forestry, Infrastructure, Regional Economic Development, and Associate Minister of Finance and Transport.

During the post-election negotiations, New Zealand First managed to secure several policies and concessions including a Regional Development Fund, the re-establishment of the New Zealand Forest Service, increasing the minimum wage to $20 per hour by 2020, a comprehensive register of foreign-owned land and housing, free doctors' visits for all under-14-year-olds, free driver training for all secondary students, a new generation SuperGold smartcard containing entitlements and concessions, a royalty on the exports of bottled water, a commitment to re-entry of the Pike River Mine, and Members of Parliament being allowed to vote in a potential referendum on euthanasia. In return, New Zealand First agreed to drop its demand for referendums on overturning New Zealand's anti-smacking ban and abolishing the Māori electorates.

In 2019, New Zealand First's Internal Affairs minister, Tracey Martin participated in negotiations with the Labour Party to pass the Abortion Legislation Bill to reform the country's abortion laws. While Martin had ruled out supporting a referendum, she was overruled by the party leader Peters who demanded a binding referendum on the proposed legislation. He also ruled out giving New Zealand First MPs a conscience vote on the issue. While the party would support the bill at first reading, Peters warned that they would withdraw support if the proposed law was not put to a public referendum. In response, Justice Minister Andrew Little rebuffed Peters' demands for a referendum on the grounds that Parliament would decide the legislation. In March 2020, seven of the 9 NZ First MPs voted against the Bill while the two female MPs voted in favour of the Bill at its final reading—Tracey Martin and Jenny Marcroft.

In late 2019, New Zealand First won a parliamentary vote to hold a euthanasia referendum, as the party threatened to vote down the legislation if it did not go to a referendum. The decision to go to a referendum passed 63–57.

=== 2020 general election ===
During the 2020 New Zealand general election, New Zealand First's party vote dropped to 75,021 (2.6%), causing the party to lose all of its seats in Parliament since it fell below the five percent threshold needed to enter Parliament through the party list alone. All NZ First MPs also lost the seats they were contesting. Two months after the election, both its president and secretary resigned. Former MP Darroch Ball became interim president; he claimed that the resignations were "always a planned retirement after the election for both roles".

=== Out of Parliament: 2020–2023 ===
On 20 June 2021, Winston Peters confirmed that he would continue leading the party for the 2023 general election. Peters also made a speech attacking the Labour, National and Green parties that touched upon various issues including transportation infrastructure in Auckland, the increasing use of the Māori language in official reports and public life, the Government's COVID-19 vaccination rollout, purchase of Ihumātao land, elimination of referendums on Māori wards and constituencies, and so-called wokeness in New Zealand society. This speech marked his first major public appearance since the 2020 general election.

=== New Zealand First Foundation fraud case: 2020–2022 ===
In mid-February 2020, the Serious Fraud Office (SFO) announced that it was investigating the NZ First Foundation in response to allegations that the party had created a slush fund. Between 2017 and 2019, New Zealand First officials had allegedly channelled half a million dollars of donations into the NZ First Foundation's bank account to cover various party-related expenses such as the party's headquarters, graphic design, an MP's legal advice, and even a $5000 day at the Wellington races. The amount of donations deposited into the foundation and used by the party was at odds with its official annual returns. Peters has denied any wrongdoing, while fellow MP Shane Jones, the Minister for Infrastructure, has denounced allegations that the party was offering policy for cash as "conspiracy theories."

In late September 2020, the Serious Fraud Office announced that they would be laying charges against two persons as a result of their investigation into the NZ First Foundation.

On 7 June 2022, the trial of two men charged with stealing NZ$746,881 worth of donations from New Zealand First between September 2015 and February 2020 began. At the time, the defendants had been granted name suppression. Prosecutor Paul Wicks QC argued that the defendants had deceived about 40 donors, the NZ First party secretary and the Electoral Commission into believing that their donations were going to the party. In fact, the money had gone into one of the defendants' bank accounts and the NZ First Foundation's bank account. Under the Electoral Act, funds donated to the NZ First Foundation between 2017 and 2020 should have been treated as party donations. According to the prosecution, the NZ First Foundation's funds were being used as a "slush fund" to cover party expenses including leasing and furnishing office space for the party's Wellington headquarters, election campaigning, and fundraisers. Wicks claimed that the defendants rather than the party's leadership controlled these funds.

On 23 June, the Crown concluded its closing arguments against the defendants. The defence concluded its closing arguments on 27 June. On 20 July, High Court Justice Pheroze Jagose permanently suppressed the names of the two defendants in the NZ First Foundation fraud case. On 22 July, the two defendants were acquitted by Justice Jagose.

In response to the NZ First Foundation trial verdict, Justice Minister Kiri Allan announced that the Government would be introducing a new electoral donation amendment bill to widen the definition of political donations to include those donated to third-party entities and making it an offence not to pass political donations to a party's secretary. Other proposed measures include lowering the donation disclosure threshold from NZ$15,000 to NZ$5,000.

=== 2023 general election ===
Before the 2023 New Zealand general election, Winston Peters said that NZ First would not join a coalition Government with Labour. In late March 2023, Peters announced that if elected into government, NZ First would remove Māori names from government departments and bring back English names. The party opposed raising the superannuation eligibility age from 65 to 67 years. It opposed vaccine mandates and proposed that gang affiliation should automatically serve as an aggravating factor in crime sentencing.

On 23 July, NZ First launched its election campaign with the slogan "Take our country back." Peters announced that the party would campaign on five key issues: combating "racist separatism," fighting Australian-owned banks and the "supermarket duopoly," investing in health, social services, and elderly care, and adopting "tough on crime" policies including designating all gangs as terrorist organisations. On 30 July, NZ First campaigned on moving the Ports of Auckland and the Royal New Zealand Navy's Devonport base to Northport, extending the North Island Main Trunk Line to Marsden Point, a new four-lane alternative highway through the Brynderwyn Range, and establishing a full inquiry into the Government's handling of the COVID-19 pandemic in New Zealand.

On 13 August, Stuff reported that several NZ First candidates including property and commercial lawyer Kirsten Murfitt, Auckland consultant Janina Massee, Matamata-Piako district councillor Caleb Ansell, and Kevin Stone had expoused various controversial views including COVID-19 vaccine hesitancy and "plandemic" conspiracy theories, New World Order conspiracy theories, climate skepticism, Qanon, and support for Uganda's Anti-Homosexuality Act, 2023. In response, Peters stated that NZ First's candidate list was provisional and defended the party's candidate selection process.

On 16 August, NZ First released its policies on transgender people on bathrooms and sports; which included introducing legislation requiring public bodies to have "clearly demarcated" unisex and single-sex toilets, restricting toilet access to individuals from the opposite sex, and requiring sporting bodies to have an "exclusive biological female category." On 20 August, NZ First released a policy of promoting English to the status of an official language of New Zealand and withdrawing from the United Nations Declaration on the Rights of Indigenous People.

During the 2023 election, New Zealand First was returned to Parliament with 6.08% of the total party vote and eight list seats.

=== Coalition with National: 2023–present ===
Following coalition talks, NZ First entered into a coalition agreement with the National and ACT parties. As part of the NZ First-National coalition agreement, National would no longer proceed with its proposed foreign buyer tax but would instead fund tax cuts via reprioritisation and other forms of revenue gathering. The new Government would also scrap the previous Labour Government's fair pay agreements, proposed hate speech legislation, co-governance policies, Auckland light rail, Three Waters reform programme, and Māori Health Authority. In addition, fees-free tertiary education would be shifted from the first to last year of tertiary study.

The Government also agreed to adopt NZ First's policy of establishing a NZ$1.2 billion Regional Infrastructure Fund, establishing English as an official language, and requiring government departments to use English for their primary names and communications, except for those dealing with Māori people. The Government also adopted NZ First's policy of halting all work related to the He Puapua report and confirming that the United Nations Declaration on the Rights of Indigenous Peoples has no legal basis in New Zealand law. The Government also agreed to restore the right to local referendum on the establishment or ongoing use of Māori wards.

As part of the NZ First-National coalition agreement the Government also agreed to end all remaining COVID-19 vaccine mandates and to hold an independent inquiry into how the COVID-19 pandemic was handled in New Zealand. This proposed independent inquiry is expected to examine the use of multiple lockdowns, vaccine procurement and efficacy, social and economic impacts on both national and regional levels, and whether decisions and actions taken by the Government were justified. While the outgoing Labour Government had commissioned a Royal Commission of Inquiry into COVID-19 Lessons Learned, Peters claimed the inquiry's terms of reference were "too limited" during election campaigning.

Within the National-led coalition government, Peters assumed the positions of Deputy Prime Minister (until 31 May 2025), Minister of Foreign Affairs and Minister of Racing. Shane Jones became Minister for Oceans and Fisheries, Regional Development, and Resources. Casey Costello became Minister of Customs and Minister for Seniors. In addition, Mark Patterson became Minister for Rural Communities and Associate Minister of Agriculture while Jenny Marcroft became Under-Secretary to the Minister for Media and Communications.

On 10 May 2024, the party introduced its Fair Access to Bathrooms Bill into Parliament, which would require all public buildings to provide clearly demarcated, unisex and single sex bathrooms. The proposed bill would also fine anyone using a single-sex toilet "who is not of the sex for which that toilet has been designated." In early July 2024, NZ First invoked its "agree to disagree" provision in its coalition agreement with National after the Government decided to allow the Royal Commission of Inquiry into COVID-19 Lessons Learned to complete its first phase and retain its chair Tony Blakely.

In early February 2025, NZ First introduced a member's bill seeking to bar banks from refusing to provide services based on environmental or social concerns. On 7 March 2025, NZ First introduced a member's bill seeking to remove so-called "woke DEI" regulations from the Public Service Act 2020. It was noted that NZ First helped pass these laws in 2020. On 22 April, Radio New Zealand reported that NZ First had withdrawn its proposed Bathrooms legislation. Peters also introduced a new member's bill pushing for the term women to be defined in New Zealand law as "an adult human biological female."

On 30 June 2025, Goldsmith confirmed that the National-led Government would introduce specific coward punching legislation as part of his party's coalition agreement with New Zealand First. A day earlier, Goldsmith proposed legislation introducing higher penalties for those assaulting correctional officers and first responders. This was also in the coalition agreement with New Zealand First. In 1 August 2025, NZ First announced a member's bill that would set the country's official name of "New Zealand" in law.

During the NZ First's annual conference held at Palmerston North on 7 September 2025, Peters proposed increasing compulsory KiwiSaver contributions to ten percent, lowering taxes and requiring migrants to sign a values statement if the party was re-elected at the 2026 general election. He also announced that Cabinet had agreed to introduce NZ First's legislation to make English an official language. On 17 September, Shane Jones was elected by the New Zealand First parliamentary caucus as the party's deputy leader. On 23 September, Peters invoked the "agree to disagree" clause of NZ First's coalition agreement with National after the Government confirmed plans to introduce two new work residency pathways. Peters said that these pathways would encourage immigrants to use New Zealand as a "stepping stone" towards immigrating to Australia.

On 4 November 2025, Peters stated that NZ First would oppose the Government's Gene Technology Bill unless major changes were made to improve protections for humans and the environment. That same day, Peters announced that NZ First would introduce a member's bill seeking to ban the sale, manufacture and importation of fireworks for private use, citing the impact of fireworks on pets and farm animals, and emergency services.

On 13 November, NZ First voted in favour of the Government's contentious Regulatory Standards Act 2025 during its third reading, allowing it to pass into law. On 20 November, Peters announced that NZ First would repeal the legislation if re-elected in 2026, stating that the party had opposed the Regulatory Standards Bill but had reluctantly supported it due to ACT's coalition agreement with National. In response, ACT leader David Seymour accused Peters of acting in bad faith and seeking to form a coalition with the Labour Party.

In late December 2025, Peters criticised a proposed Indian-New Zealand free trade agreement, saying that it disadvantaged New Zealand's dairy industry and boosted Indian immigration to New Zealand. He also invoked New Zealand First's "agree to disagree" provision of its coalition agreement with the National Party.

During the party's State of the Nation address in Tauranga on 22 March 2026, Peters announced that NZ First would campaign on splitting the four major power companies to break their dominance of the New Zealand energy sector and reduce proper prices. Former National MP and NewZeal leader Alfred Ngaro also announced that he would be standing as a candidate for that party during the 2026 New Zealand general election. That same day, Ngaro confirmed that he and the NewZeal party would align with NZ First, citing "strategic realism and shared values."

In April 2026, NZ First MP Jenny Marcroft's member's bill defining men and women according to their biological sex was drawn from the private member's ballot. The proposed bill would amend the Legislation Act to define a woman as an "adult human biological female" and a man as "adult human biological male." Lawyers Graeme Edgeler and Matt McKillop regarded the proposed bill as unnecessary since existing New Zealand legislation already permitted sex-segregated facilities and sex-differentiated sports. The opposition Green Party rainbow issues spokesperson Kahurangi Carter condemned the proposed bill as harmful to the transgender community while Justice Minister Paul Goldsmith said that the bill was not a priority for the Sixth National Government. The bill passed its first reading on 20 May 2026 with the support of the National and ACT parties.

On 30 July 2026, New Zealand First's English Language Act 2026 passed into law, with the support of the governing coalition and the opposition Labour parties.

==== 2026 general election ====
During the 2026 New Zealand general election held on 7 November, the party campaigned on various populist and nationalist policies including banning the public sale and private use of fireworks on animal welfare grounds, restricting voting rights and superannuation to New Zealand citizens, and tightening citizenship and immigration criteria. In terms of economic policies, NZ First advocated a mixture of interventionist and deregulatory policies including forcing Foodstuffs to split into two cooperatives, nationalising the Bank of New Zealand, and mining on conservation land and curbing the regulatory powers of the Department of Conservation, In terms of Māori policies, NZ First campaigned on holding a referendum on the Māori electorates and winding up the Waitangi Tribunal once all outstanding claims had been resolved.

In 2026, NZ First ran 50 candidates including former parliamentarians Alfred Ngaro, Michael Laws, Harete Hipango, Ron Mark, former Financial Markets Authority chair Craig Stobo, All Blacks rugby veteran Taine Randell, and former Mayors Jamie Cleine and Vince Cocurullo. Based on preliminary results released on 8 November, the party gained 9.78 percent of the party vote, bringing 12 list MPs into Parliament.

== Ideology and policies ==
Historically in the 1990s and the 2000s the party was often labelled as simply populist. From the 2010s onwards the party has been referred to as right-wing populist. Over the years the party has also variously been described as nationalist centrist, conservative, socially conservative, centre-right, and right-wing. Conversely, academic Todd Donovan argued in 2020 that "radical right / right-wing populist" is a misclassification of New Zealand First because it is neither radical nor right-wing.

New Zealand First takes a broadly centrist and interventionist position on economic issues and a socially conservative position on moral issues. The party distinguishes itself from the mainstream political establishment through its use of populist rhetoric, and supports binding referendums for major social and political change. The party is also anti-immigration and anti-globalisation, while also supportive of protectionism and pensioners' interests. The party's support base is mostly composed of middle-aged to elderly, rural and Māori voters.

The party has long advocated direct democracy in the form of "binding citizen initiated referenda", to create "a democracy that is of the people and for the people", while forcing government "to accept the will of the people". Peters has also used anti-establishment and anti-elite rhetoric, such as criticising what he regards as the "intellectually arrogant elite in government and bureaucratic circles".

At the core of New Zealand First's policies are its "Fifteen Fundamental Principles"; the first being "To put New Zealand and New Zealanders First". They largely echo the policies that Winston Peters, the party's founder, has advocated during his career. NZ First seeks to "promote and protect the customs, traditions and values of all New Zealanders". Commentators have described the party, and Peters himself, as nationalist. Former party official and parliamentary researcher Josh Van Veen has characterised the party as culturally conservative due to its emphasis on preserving heritage and respect for national symbols. Van Veen opines that New Zealand First's emphasis on an inclusive national identity has led to a marriage between liberal values and progressive nationalism.

=== Social and economic policies ===
New Zealand First has been closely associated with its policies regarding the welfare of senior citizens and its anti-immigration stance. The party has frequently criticised immigration on economic, social and cultural grounds. It proposes an annual immigration cap of between 7,000 and 15,000 "seriously qualified" migrants, who would be expected to assimilate into New Zealand culture.

Peters has on several occasions characterised the rate of Asian immigration into New Zealand as too high; in 2004, he stated: "We are being dragged into the status of an Asian colony and it is time that New Zealanders were placed first in their own country". On 26 April 2005, he said: "Māori will be disturbed to know that in 17 years' time they will be outnumbered by Asians in New Zealand", an estimate disputed by Statistics New Zealand, the government's statistics bureau, which stated that with a 145% increase from 270,000 to 670,000, the Asian community would still be smaller in 2021 than the Māori, who would increase by 5% to 760,000 over the same timeframe. Peters quickly rebutted that Statistics New Zealand has underestimated the growth rate of the Asian community in the past, as the Bureau had corrected its estimation by a 66,000 increase between 2003 and 2005. In April 2008, Deputy Leader Peter Brown drew widespread attention after voicing similar views and expressing concern at the growth of New Zealand's ethnic Asian population: "If we continue this open door policy there is real danger we will be inundated with people who have no intention of integrating into our society … They will form their own mini-societies to the detriment of integration and that will lead to division, friction and resentment".

New Zealand First also espouses a mixture of economic policies. Peters has called for economic nationalism. The party supports raising the minimum wage to a living wage, opposes the privatisation of state assets (particularly to overseas buyers) and advocates buying back former state-owned enterprises. These policies align it with views generally found on the left of New Zealand politics. On the other hand, it favours reducing taxation and reducing the size of government (policies typical of the New Zealand right) and espouses both social conservatism and welfare chauvinism. New Zealand First provided for its strong support among elderly voters by its repeal of the surtax on superannuation, institution of a superannuation level of 66% of the net average wage, and introduction of the SuperGold Card. The party opposes any raising of the retirement age.

"Law and order" issues feature heavily in the party's policy platform. New Zealand First advocates a stricter criminal code, longer judicial sentences, and the lowering of the age of criminal responsibility. In 2011, at its annual convention, New Zealand First vowed to repeal the controversial Crimes (Substituted Section 59) Amendment Act 2007 (which it characterised as the "anti-smacking law"), which a vast majority of voters rejected in a non-binding 2009 citizen-initiated referendum. In the 2017 general election campaign, the party again vowed to repeal the Crimes (Substituted Section 59) Amendment Act; it also ruled out a confidence and supply arrangement or coalition with any party which opposed the policy.

In 2013, all seven NZ First MPs voted against the third reading of the Marriage Amendment Bill, which permitted same sex marriage in New Zealand. Peters had called for a referendum on the issue.

==== SuperGold Card ====
The SuperGold Card, a discounts and concessions card for senior citizens and veterans, has been a major initiative of the party.

As a condition of the 2005 confidence and supply agreement between New Zealand First and the Labour Government, Peters launched the SuperGold Card in August 2007. The card is available to all eligible New Zealanders over the age of 65. A Veterans' SuperGold Card also exists for those who have served in the New Zealand Defence Force in a recognised war or emergency.

=== Relations with Māori ===
Winston Peters is Māori. At its high-water mark after the 1996 election, the party won all Māori electorates (the five MPs were nicknamed the "Tight Five"). It continued to receive significant support from voters registered in Māori electorates for some years afterward. New Zealand First no longer supports the retention of the Māori electorates and decided not to stand candidates in the Māori electorates after the 1999 election.

New Zealand First is further characterised by its strong stance on the Treaty of Waitangi. The party refers to the Treaty as a "source of national pride" but does not support it becoming a part of constitutional law. Peters has criticised what he refers to as a Treaty "Grievance Industry"—which profits from making frivolous claims of violations of the Treaty—and the cost of Treaty negotiations and settlement payments. The party has called for an end to "special treatment" of Māori.

On 19 July 2017, Peters promised that a New Zealand First government would hold two binding referendums on whether Maori electorates should be abolished and whether the number of MPs should be reduced to 100. Following the 2017 general election, Peters indicated that he would be willing to consider dropping his call for a referendum on abolishing the Māori electorates during coalition-forming negotiations with Labour leader Jacinda Ardern. In 2026 the party returned to campaigning on a referendum to abolish the seats.

In 2023, Peters expressed disapproval of the utilisation of te reo Māori names for government departments, describing them as "incomprehensible" to the majority of New Zealanders and criticising "tokenism". The coalition government, which New Zealand First has joined, has agreed to rename departments to "have their primary name in English, except for those specifically related to Māori".

== Election results ==
=== House of Representatives ===
Election	Leader	Votes	%	Seats	+/–	Status
1993	Winston Peters	161,481	8.40%	2 / 99	▲2	Opposition
1996	Winston Peters	276,603	13.35%	17 / 120	▲15	Coalition (1996–1998)
1996	Winston Peters	276,603	13.35%	17 / 120	▲15	Opposition (1998–1999)
1999	Winston Peters	87,926	4.26%	5 / 120	▼12	Opposition
2002	Winston Peters	210,912	10.38%	13 / 120	▲8	Opposition
2005	Winston Peters	130,115	5.72%	7 / 121	▼6	Confidence and supply
2008	Winston Peters	95,356	4.07%	0 / 122	▼7	No seats
2011	Winston Peters	147,544	6.59%	8 / 121	▲8	Opposition
2014	Winston Peters	208,300	8.66%	11 / 121	▲3	Opposition
2017	Winston Peters	186,706	7.20%	9 / 120	▼2	Coalition
2020	Winston Peters	75,021	2.60%	0 / 120	▼9	No seats
2023	Winston Peters	173,425	6.08%	8 / 123	▲8	Coalition
2026	Winston Peters	TBD	TBD	12 / 131	▲4	TBD
Source: Electoral Commission

==== Māori electorates ====
Election	Seats	+/–
1993	1 / 4	▲1
1996	5 / 5	▲4
1999	0 / 6	▼5

== Office-holders ==
Leader	Deputy Leader	President
Winston Peters; 18 July 1993 – present	Tau Henare; 18 July 1993 – 19 December 1998	Doug Woolerton; 1993–2005
Winston Peters; 18 July 1993 – present	Peter Brown; 19 December 1998 – 14 February 2009	Doug Woolerton; 1993–2005
Winston Peters; 18 July 1993 – present	Peter Brown; 19 December 1998 – 14 February 2009	Dail Jones; 2005–2008
Winston Peters; 18 July 1993 – present	Peter Brown; 19 December 1998 – 14 February 2009	George Groombridge; 2008–2010
Winston Peters; 18 July 1993 – present	Vacant; 2009–2013	George Groombridge; 2008–2010
Winston Peters; 18 July 1993 – present	Vacant; 2009–2013	Kevin Gardiner; 2010–2013
Winston Peters; 18 July 1993 – present	Tracey Martin; 23 October 2013 – 3 July 2015	Anne Martin; 2013–2015
Winston Peters; 18 July 1993 – present	Ron Mark; 3 July 2015 – 27 February 2018	Brent Catchpole; 2015–2018
Winston Peters; 18 July 1993 – present	Fletcher Tabuteau; 27 February 2018 – 2020	Lester Gray; 2018–2019
Winston Peters; 18 July 1993 – present	Fletcher Tabuteau; 27 February 2018 – 2020	Kristin Campbell Smith; 2019–2020
Winston Peters; 18 July 1993 – present	Vacant; 2020 – 17 September 2025	Julian Paul; 2021–present
Winston Peters; 18 July 1993 – present	Shane Jones; 17 September 2025 – present	Julian Paul; 2021–present

== See also ==
- Politics of New Zealand
- Young New Zealand First
