= Kiwis Against Further Immigration =

- Leader: Bevan Skelton
- Preceded by: New Zealand Defence Movement
- Ideology: Anti-immigration; Nationalism

Kiwis Against Further Immigration was a small right-wing extremist lobby group and political party in New Zealand. It changed its name from the New Zealand Defence Movement in 1994.

The group vehemently opposed immigration to New Zealand, and treated "multiculturalism" with deep suspicion. They were opposed to iwi organisations, saying they had no role to play in modern society. They claimed immigrants were reintroducing tuberculosis to New Zealand, and that immigration policies were turning Auckland into a "polluted zoo".

== History ==
The group was re-launched on Anzac Day 1994 and had 150 members at its launch with a target of reaching 500 members to contest the 1996 general election. Leader Bevan Skelton stated that the "defence" label had caused confusion with voters in the 11 electorates it contested in 1993. It was inspired the Australian political party Australians Against Further Immigration, sharing the same philosophy of halting immigration and preserving the existing culture of the country. Skelton stated "We are not racist. We are pro New Zealand citizens."

The party instigated a campaign to the Complaints Review Tribunal arguing that the Sunday Star-Times breached the Human Rights Act 1993 by not capitalising the letter P in the word Pākehā. Their spokesperson, Bevin Skelton, said "We've got a society where people are running around throwing bricks through Somali family's windows. It's my contention that as the pakeha are unable to express their ethnicity and coherently argue their case - in fear of being racist - they instead sneak around and throw rocks through bedroom windows." The newspaper's lawyer said the case was a costly "nutter complaint".

In 1997 the group was jeered and heckled at the New Zealand Population Conference. Their spokesperson, Evan Skelton, told the conference that New Zealand didn't need any Asian migrants and said "I want to keep my distance from Asia forever. I don't want my kids to have to die in their wars." The group displayed placards in the banquet room reading "The best thing about New Zealand is its small population" and "New Zealand's population policy is archaic - only three other nations actually encourage immigration."

== Elections ==
Auckland lawyer Bevin Skelton stood for the party in the 1992 Tamaki by-election who won 57 votes (0.33%)

The party stood a candidate at the 1994 Selwyn by-election, automotive repairer Bruce Annan, who won 29 votes (0.14%).

Other candidates have included Anthony Van Den Heuvel.
