= 1993 New Zealand general election =

General election in New Zealand

- 6 November 1993

All 99 seats in the House of Representatives 50 seats needed for a majority
- Opinion polls
- Turnout: 1,922,796 (82.82%)
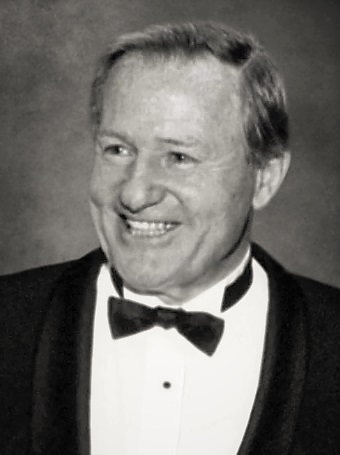

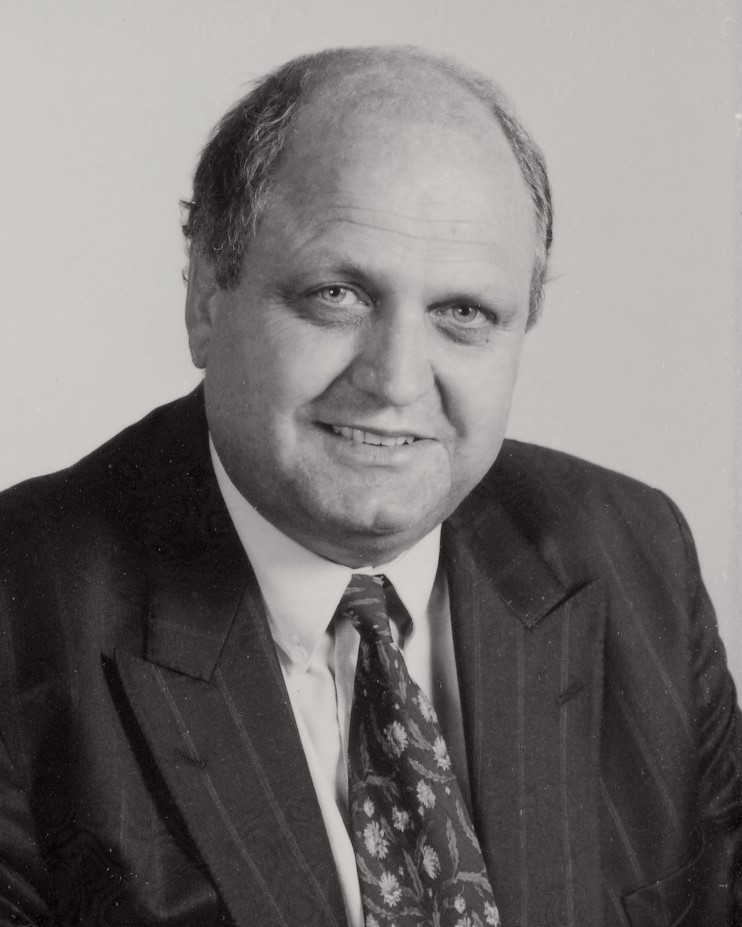

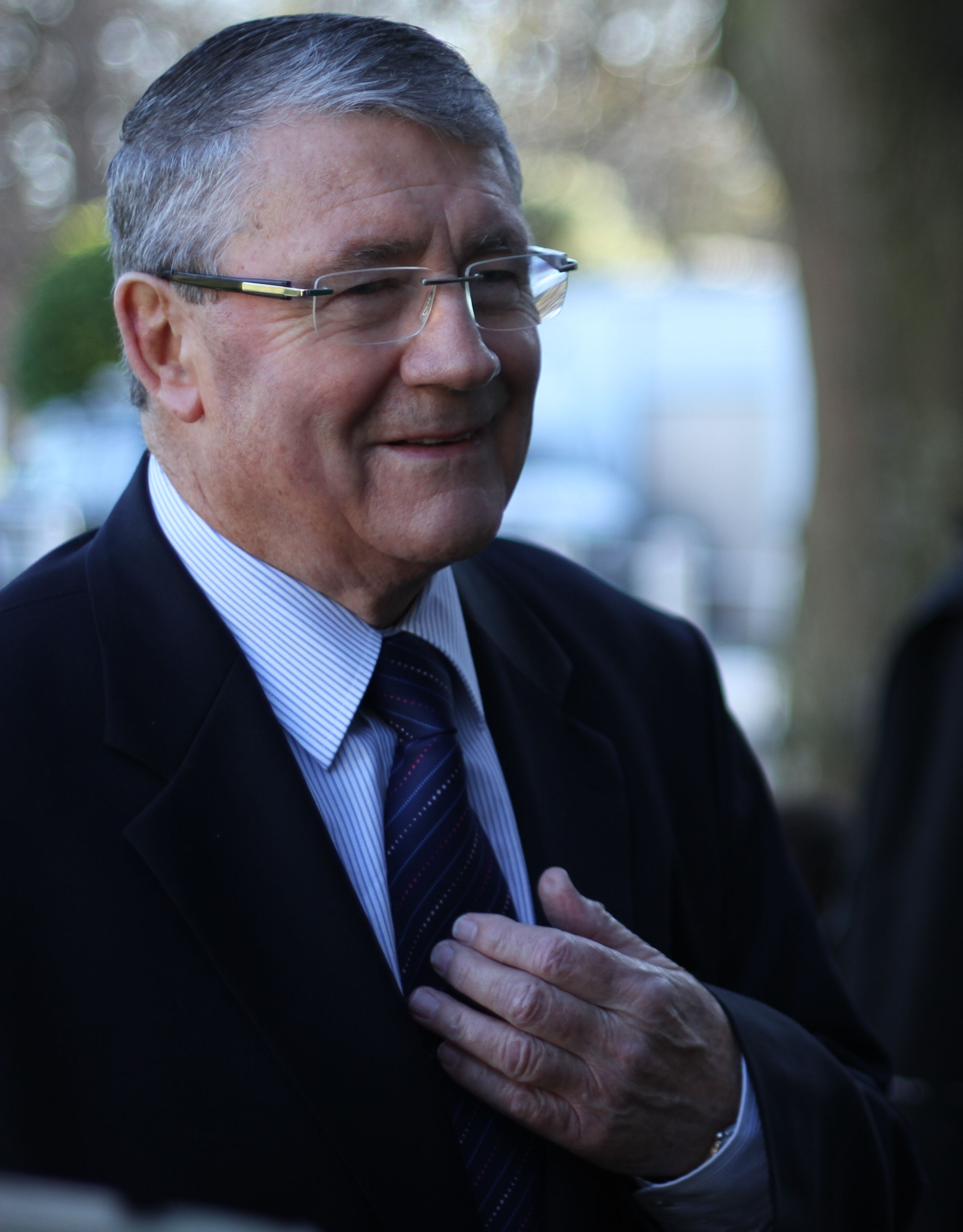

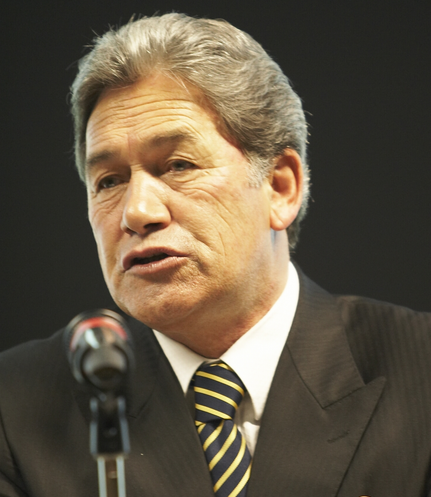
	First party	Second party
Leader	Jim Bolger	Mike Moore
Party	National	Labour
Leader since	26 March 1986	4 September 1990
Leader's seat	King Country	Christchurch North
Last election	67 seats, 47.82%	29 seats, 35.14%
Seats before	63	29
Seats won	50	45
Seat change	▼17	▲16
Popular vote	673,892	666,759
Percentage	35.05%	34.68%
Swing	▼12.77%	▼0.46%
	Third party	Fourth party
Leader	Jim Anderton	Winston Peters
Party	Alliance	NZ First
Leader since	1 December 1991	18 July 1993
Leader's seat	Sydenham	Tauranga
Last election	1 seat, 14.28%	New party
Seats before	2	2
Seats won	2	2
Seat change	Steady	Steady
Popular vote	350,063	161,481
Percentage	18.21%	8.40%
Swing	▲3.93%	▲8.40%
- Results by electorate, shaded by winning margin
Prime Minister before election
Jim Bolger
National
Subsequent Prime Minister
Jim Bolger
National

The 1993 New Zealand general election was held on 6 November 1993 to determine the composition of the 44th New Zealand Parliament. Voters elected 99 members to the House of Representatives, up from 97 members at the 1990 election. The election was held concurrently with an electoral reform referendum to replace the first-past-the-post system, with all members elected from single-member electorates, with mixed-member proportional representation. The referendum carried by 53.9% to 46.1%. Due to the result of the referendum, this was the last NZ election where all the members were elected by direct election in districts. Prior to the next election, NZ shifted to a mixed member proportional system.

The election re-elected the governing National Party, led by Jim Bolger, to a second term in office, despite a major swing away from National in both seats and votes.

Having broken electoral campaign promises and embarked on supply-side economics and wide-sweeping cuts during his first term, Bolger led the most unpopular government since the Great Depression. The neoliberal actions of Ruth Richardson, his Minister of Finance, were termed Ruthanasia by the media, and her Mother of all Budgets in 1991 caused huge protests. By September 1991, support for National had plummeted to a hitherto unprecedented polling low of 22%. Mike Moore, ousted by Bolger in a landslide just three years before, attacked National's caucus as dangerous right-wing extremists, and enjoyed considerable personal popularity. While the high unemployment Ruthanasia had caused had recovered somewhat by 1993, Bolger's approval ratings remained dire against Moore up until election day.

With a vote difference of just 7,133 between the two major parties, the election was one of the closest in New Zealand history. Bolger's 17-seat majority gained in 1990 was pared back to a bare majority of one seat. The Labour Party, led by former Prime Minister Mike Moore, enjoyed a 16-seat rise and almost won outright. The two smaller parties – Winston Peters' New Zealand First, which he formed after leaving National over conflict with their economic policy, and Jim Anderton's Alliance of parties to the left of Labour – both outperformed expectations and won significant shares of the vote. However, the first-past-the-post system kept them from gaining more than two seats each.

If MMP had been in use, the left-wing bloc of Labour and the Alliance – having secured a larger share of the vote than National or New Zealand First – would likely have formed a government. This was the last time prior to the 2020 election where a party won an absolute majority of seats.

== Background ==
Before the election, the National Party governed with 64 seats, while the opposition Labour Party held only 29. The 1990 election had been a major victory for the National Party, with the unpopular Fourth Labour Government being decisively defeated. The Labour Party had become unpopular for its ongoing economic reforms, nicknamed Rogernomics after Minister of Finance Roger Douglas, which were based around liberalisation, privatisation, and the removal of tariffs and subsidies. The National Party divided as to the merits of the reforms, with conservatives generally opposed and libertarians generally in favour. The party had fought the 1990 election saying that the Labour government's program was too radical, and was being carried out without any thought of the social consequences – Jim Bolger spoke about "the Decent Society", promising a return to a more moderate and balanced platform.

Once in government, however, the key Minister of Finance role was taken not by a moderate but by Ruth Richardson, who wished to expand, not end, the economic reforms. Upon gaining power, Richardson intensified the deregulation, creating an portfolio of neoliberal policies popularly known as Ruthanasia. Richardson's "Mother of all Budgets", released in 1991, slashed available unemployment, sickness and welfare benefits. The families benefit by $25.00 to $27.00, unemployment benefit was cut by $14.00 a week, sickness benefit by $27.04. Universal payments for family benefits were completely abolished, and user pay schemes were introduced in a libertarian fashion. The Employment Contracts Act sought to weaken trade unions, by meaning employees had to have individual contracts or be on a single-employer collective agreement. Richardson also ended free tertiary education altogether, after the Fourth Labour Government had ended bursaries.

These policies, a steep departure even from Rogernomics, led to a major backlash in multiple aspects of society, both on the left and the right. Students and trade unionists led protests and marches in Wellington and Auckland against university cuts and the Employment Contracts Bill. Many of the voters who had felt betrayed by Labour's reforms now felt betrayed by the National Party as well. The Mother of all Budgets not only caused widespread public contempt for the National Party but also wreaked havoc internally. The budget was lamented by the conservative wing of the National Party; former Prime Minister Sir Robert Muldoon resigned from his Tamaki electorate in protest of Richardson's policies, triggering a by-election. Polling declined massively for National, and Mike Moore shot up in approval ratings while attacking National's caucus as right-wing extremists. According to an episode of Frontline on TVNZ 1 that aired less than two weeks before the election, Bolger led the most unpopular government since the Great Depression. By September 1991, support for National had plummeted to a hitherto unprecedented polling low of 22%.

The Alliance, the largest "third party", was a broad coalition of five smaller groups – the NewLabour Party (a Labour splinter), the Democrats (a social credit party), the Greens (an environmentalist party), Mana Motuhake (a Māori party), and the Liberal Party (a National splinter). The Alliance held three seats in Parliament – one belonged to Jim Anderton, who had been re-elected under a NewLabour banner in the seat he had formerly held for Labour, while the other two belonged to the National MPs who formed the Liberal Party. In its first electoral test, the 1992 by-election in Tamaki, the Alliance had performed well, taking second place. Another smaller group was New Zealand First, a party established by former National MP Winston Peters. Peters had broken with his party after a number of policy disputes with its leadership, and resigned from parliament to contest his seat as an independent. After being overwhelmingly re-elected, Peters established New Zealand First to promote his views. Peters was the party's sole MP.

Another consequence of dissatisfaction with both major parties was the referendum conducted alongside the 1993 election. The culmination of the larger decade-long New Zealand electoral reform process, the referendum was held following the September 1992 indicative referendum, which saw 85% of voters voting for change from the existing First Past The Post (FPP) system, and 70% choosing the Mixed Member Proportional (MMP) as its preferred replacement: a proportional system which would make it easier for smaller parties to win seats. It asked voters to choose whether to keep the existing FPP system or change to MMP, with 53.9% of voters opting to change to MMP.

While National and Labour usually stood candidates in every seat, National was one candidate short as their Southern Maori candidate apparently did not apply in time. Just weeks before the election, Labour realised it had not selected a candidate for Waitotara. At very short notice it selected former Wanganui rugby union and Manawatu rugby league representative, Kelvin Lehmstedt, as their candidate for the seat. Lehmstedt's partner, Sue Foley, was a press secretary for Mike Moore.

=== MPs retiring in 1993 ===
Four MPs, including three National MPs and one Labour MP, intended to retire at the end of the 43rd Parliament.

Party	Name	Electorate
National	Jeff Grant	Awarua
National	Jeff Whittaker	Hastings
National	Gail McIntosh	Lyttlelton
Labour	Sonja Davies	Pencarrow

=== Electoral system ===
In this election, the first past the post electoral system was used. Ninety-five MPs were elected in general electorates covering the country. In addition, the country was divided into four Māori electorates. All electorates returned a single member.

== The election ==
The election was held on 6 November. 2,321,664 people were registered to vote, and 85.2% turned out. This turnout was almost exactly the same as for the previous election, although slightly less than what would be seen for the following one.

== Results ==
With a vote difference of just 7,133 between the two major parties, the election was one of the closest in New Zealand history. Preliminary results based on election night counts saw the country facing its first hung parliament since 1931, with no party gaining the 50 seats required for a majority. The National Party won 49 seats, a drop of 15 from before the election, and Labour had won 46 seats, with the balance of power held with the Alliance and New Zealand First, which won two seats each. This led to Jim Bolger saying on public television, "Bugger the pollsters", as polls had predicted a comfortable National victory. Bolger reacted to the election results by giving a conciliatory speech, while Labour leader Mike Moore delivered a speech later described by political scientist Jack Vowles as "damaging" and "more appropriate for a decisive Labour win than a narrow defeat."

On election night result with the two major parties tied, the Governor-General Dame Catherine Tizard asked her predecessor Sir David Beattie to form a committee, along with three retired appeal court judges, to decide whom to appoint as prime minister. However National won one more seat and was returned to power when the official count saw the seat of Waitaki swing from Labour to National, giving National 50 seats and Labour 45 seats. Labour's Sir Peter Tapsell agreed to become speaker of the New Zealand House of Representatives (so that National would not lose a vote in the house). Hence National had a majority of one seat.

The 1993–1996 parliamentary term would see a number of defections from both major parties, meaning that National would eventually be forced to make alliances to retain power.

== Detailed results ==
=== Party totals ===
Summary of the 6 November 1993 New Zealand House of Representatives election results
Party	Votes	% of votes		Seats	
Party	Votes	%	change	total	change
National	673,892	35.05	-12.78	50	-17
Labour	666,759	34.68	-0.46	45	+16
Alliance	350,064	18.21	+3.93^{a}	2	+1^{b}
NZ First	161,481	8.40	+8.4	2	+2
Christian Heritage	38,749	2.02	+1.49	0	–
McGillicuddy Serious	11,706	0.61	+0.06	0	–
Natural Law	6,056	0.31	+0.31	0	–
Mana Māori	3,342	0.17	+0.17	0	–
minor parties and independents	10,747	0.56	+0.34	0	–
total votes	1,922,796	100.00		99	+2
total registered electors	2,321,664				
turnout	82.82%				

^{a} Increase over Alliance's constituent member parties' (Greens, NewLabour, Democrats and Mana Motuhake) combined vote share in 1990.
^{b} Increase of one over Alliance's constituent party, NewLabour's result in 1990.

=== Votes summary ===
Popular Vote
National	35.05%
Labour	34.68%
Alliance	18.21%
NZ First	8.40%
Christian Heritage	2.02%
Others	1.65%

Parliament seats
National	50.50%
Labour	45.45%
Alliance	2.02%
NZ First	2.02%

=== Electorate results ===
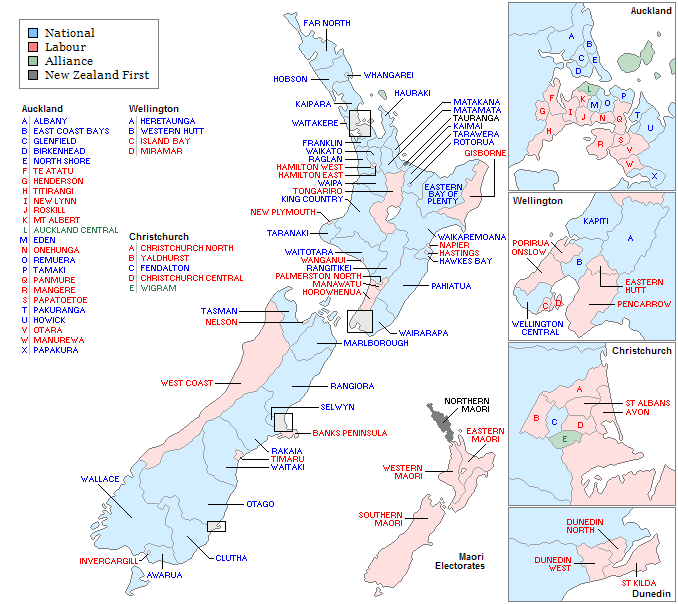

The table below shows the results of the 1993 general election by electorate:

Key

National Labour Alliance NZ First Independent

Electorate results for the 1993 New Zealand general election
Electorate	Incumbent	Winner	Majority	Runner up
General electorates
Albany	Don McKinnon		3,651	Jill Jeffs
Auckland Central	Richard Prebble	Sandra Lee	1,291	Richard Prebble
Avon	Larry Sutherland		5,643	Marie Venning
Awarua	Jeff Grant	Eric Roy	2,236	Olivia Scaletti-Longley
Birkenhead	Ian Revell		104	Ann Hartley
Christchurch Central	Lianne Dalziel		6,189	Andrew Rowe
Christchurch North	Mike Moore		6,024	Lee Morgan
Clutha	Robin Gray		4,117	Jeff Buchanan
Dunedin North	Pete Hodgson		3,794	Hugh Perkins
Dunedin West	Clive Matthewson		4,477	Ollie Turner
East Coast Bays	Murray McCully		4,516	Heather-Anne McConachy
Eastern Bay of Plenty	New electorate	Tony Ryall	806	Diane Collins
Eastern Hutt	Paul Swain		4,718	Peter MacMillan
Eden	Christine Fletcher		3,394	Verna Smith
Far North	New electorate	John Carter	3,425	Maryanne Baker
Fendalton	Philip Burdon		4,982	Tony Day
Franklin	New electorate	Bill Birch	3,543	Judy Bischoff
Gisborne	Wayne Kimber	Janet Mackey	1,068	Wayne Kimber
Glenfield	Peter Hilt		1,983	Ann Batten
Hamilton East	Tony Steel	Dianne Yates	80	Tony Steel
Hamilton West	Grant Thomas	Martin Gallagher	449	Grant Thomas
Hastings	Jeff Whittaker	Rick Barker	2,571	Cynthia Bowers
Hauraki	New electorate	Warren Kyd	1,870	Jeanette Fitzsimons
Hawkes Bay	Michael Laws		3,143	Peter Reynolds
Henderson	New electorate	Jack Elder	2,130	David Jorgensen
Heretaunga	Peter McCardle		832	Heather Simpson
Hobson	Ross Meurant		2,697	Frank Grover
Horowhenua	Hamish Hancock	Judy Keall	2,347	Hamish Hancock
Howick	New electorate	Trevor Rogers	5,754	James Clarke
Invercargill	Rob Munro	Mark Peck	1,174	Rob Munro
Island Bay	Elizabeth Tennet		5,422	Chris Shields
Kaimai	Robert Anderson		372	Peter Brown
Kaipara	Lockwood Smith		2,958	Rosalie Steward
Kapiti	Roger Sowry		1,038	Rob Calder
King Country	Jim Bolger		4,506	Murray Simpson
Lyttelton	Gail McIntosh	Ruth Dyson	677	David Carter
Manawatu	Hamish MacIntyre (Note: Hamish MacIntyre left National in 1992, joining the Liberal Party which became part of the Alliance)	Jill White	164	Gray Baldwin
Māngere	David Lange		5,958	Len Richards
Manurewa	George Hawkins		4,014	Mark Chalmers
Marlborough	Doug Kidd		2,548	Ron Howard
Matakana	New electorate	Graeme Lee	893	John Neill
Matamata	John Luxton		5,977	John Pemberton
Miramar	Graeme Reeves	Annette King	2,595	Graeme Reeves
Mount Albert	Helen Clark		4,656	Vanessa Brown
Napier	Geoff Braybrooke		4,926	Colleen Pritchard
Nelson	John Blincoe		2,007	Margaret Emerre
New Lynn	Jonathan Hunt		1,598	Cliff Robinson
New Plymouth	John Armstrong	Harry Duynhoven	3,126	John Armstrong
North Shore	Bruce Cliffe		4,723	Joel Cayford
Onehunga	Grahame Thorne	Richard Northey	407	Grahame Thorne
Onslow	New electorate	Peter Dunne	1,065	George Mathew
Otago	Warren Cooper		3,220	Janet Yiakmis
Otara	Trevor Rogers	Taito Phillip Field	5,981	Shane Frith
Pahiatua	John Falloon		5,178	Margo Martindale
Pakuranga	Maurice Williamson		5,460	Heather MacKay
Palmerston North	Steve Maharey		3,764	Barbara Stones
Panmure	Judith Tizard		3,277	Bruce Jesson
Papakura	John Robertson		484	Nancy Hawks
Papatoetoe	Ross Robertson		5,977	Jim Wild
Pencarrow	Sonja Davies	Trevor Mallard	2,641	Rosemarie Thomas
Porirua	Graham Kelly		6,713	Lagi Sipeli
Raglan	Simon Upton		4,540	Bill Harris
Rakaia	New electorate	Jenny Shipley	4,540	John Howie
Rangiora	Jim Gerard		4,469	Maureen Little
Rangitīkei	Denis Marshall		3,422	Bob Peck
Remuera	Doug Graham		8,619	Mary Tierney
Roskill	Gilbert Myles (Note: Gilbert Myles left National in 1991, becoming Independent, then joining the Liberal Party, which became part of the Alliance, finally New Zealand First in 1992–93)	Phil Goff	2,205	Allan Spence
Rotorua	Paul East		429	Keith Ridings
Selwyn	Ruth Richardson		888	Ron Mark
St Albans	David Caygill		3,425	Raewyn Dawson
St Kilda	Michael Cullen		5,071	Leah McBey
Sydenham	Jim Anderton		7,476	Greg Coyle
Tāmaki	Clem Simich		7,951	Richard Green
Taranaki	Roger Maxwell		4,871	Stephen Wood
Tarawera	Max Bradford		4,155	Gordon Dickson
Tasman	Nick Smith		4,059	Geoff Rowling
Tauranga	Winston Peters (Note: Winston Peters had been an independent since the 1993 by-election.)	Winston Peters	7,924	John Cronin
Te Atatū	Brian Neeson	Chris Carter	1,388	Laila Harré
Timaru	Maurice McTigue	Jim Sutton	2,940	Maurice McTigue
Titirangi	Marie Hasler	Suzanne Sinclair	340	Marie Hasler
Tongariro	Ian Peters	Mark Burton	1,951	Ian Peters
Waikaremoana	Roger McClay		4,021	Gregg Sheehan
Waikato	Rob Storey		2,286	Susan Moore
Waipa	Katherine O'Regan		3,730	John Kilbride
Wairarapa	Wyatt Creech		2,229	Peter Teahan
Waitakere	New electorate	Brian Neeson	3,180	Barbara Hutchinson
Waitaki	Alec Neill		53	Bruce Albiston (Note: Albiston was first on election night for Waitaki, but lost when special votes were included)
Waitotara	Peter Gresham		4,545	Kelvin Lehmstedt
Wallace	Bill English		5,578	Lesley Soper
Wanganui	Cam Campion (Note: Campion became an independent on 3 March 1993)	Jill Pettis	3,371	Gael Donoghue
Wellington-Karori	New electorate	Pauline Gardiner	480	Chris Laidlaw
West Coast	Margaret Moir	Damien O'Connor	2,920	Margaret Moir
Western Hutt	Joy Quigley		1,542	Vern Walsh
Whangarei	John Banks		1,587	Mark Furey
Yaldhurst	Margaret Austin		2,997	David Watson
Māori electorates
Eastern Maori	Peter Tapsell		6,666	Alamein Kopu
Northern Maori	Bruce Gregory	Tau Henare	416	Bruce Gregory
Southern Maori	Whetu Tirikatene-Sullivan		6,340	Jules Parkinson
Western Maori	Koro Wētere		3,777	Ricky Taiaroa

Table footnotes:

=== Summary of changes ===
Based on the 1991 New Zealand census, an electoral redistribution was carried out; the last one had been carried out in 1987 based on the previous census in 1986. This resulted in the abolition of nine electorates, and the creation of eleven new electorates. Through an amendment in the Electoral Act in 1965, the number of electorates in the South Island was fixed at 25, so the new electorates increased the number of the North Island electorates by two. In the South Island, one electorate was abolished (Ashburton), and one electorate was recreated (Rakaia). In the North Island, five electorates were newly created (Eastern Bay of Plenty, Far North, Howick, Matakana, and Wellington-Karori), five electorates were recreated (Franklin, Hauraki, Henderson, Onslow, and Waitakere), and eight electorates were abolished (Bay of Islands, Clevedon, Coromandel, East Cape, Maramarua, Ohariu, Wellington Central, and West Auckland).

In many cases an MP from an abolished seat stood for, and was elected to a new one that broadly covered their previous electorate.

Abolished Electorate		MP relocated		New Electorate
Ashburton	→	Jenny Shipley	→	Rakaia
Bay of Islands	→	John Carter	→	Far North
Clevedon	→	Warren Kyd	→	Hauraki
Coromandel	→	Graeme Lee	→	Matakana
East Cape	→	Tony Ryall	→	Eastern Bay of Plenty
Maramarua	→	Bill Birch	→	Franklin
Ohariu	→	Peter Dunne	→	Onslow
West Auckland	→	Jack Elder	→	Henderson
One MP from an abolished electorate failed to win a new electorate
Wellington Central		Pauline Gardiner ✓		Wellington-Karori
Wellington Central		Chris Laidlaw ✗		Wellington-Karori
Due to boundary changes, two MPs moved to safer new electorates
Marginal Electorate		MP relocated		New Electorate
Te Atatu	→	Brian Neeson	→	Waitakere
Otara	→	Trevor Rogers	→	Howick

New electorates.

- Eastern Bay of Plenty – most of the abolished East Cape seat, plus part of Tarawera. Won by former East Cape MP Tony Ryall.
- Far North – most of the abolished Bay of Islands seat. Won by former Bay of Islands MP John Carter.
- Franklin – part of the abolished Maramarua seat and part of Papakura. Won by former Maramarua MP Bill Birch.
- Hauraki – parts of the abolished Clevedon, Maramarua, and Coromandel seats. Won by former Clevedon MP Warren Kyd.
- Henderson – parts taken from the West Auckland, Te Atatu, and Titirangi electorates. Won by former West Auckland MP Jack Elder (Labour).
- Howick – the eastern part of the Otara seat. Won by former Otara MP Trevor Rogers (National).
- Matakana – part of the abolished Coromandel seat. Won by former Coromandel MP Graeme Lee.
- Onslow – the core of the abolished Ohariu seat. Won by former Ohariu MP Peter Dunne (Labour).
- Rakaia – the abolished Ashburton seat, plus part of the Selwyn seat. Won by former Ashburton MP Jenny Shipley (National).
- Waitakere – chiefly, the abolished seat of West Auckland. Won by former Te Atatu MP Brian Neeson (National).
- Wellington-Karori – the abolished Wellington Central seat, plus part of the abolished Ohariu seat. Won by new National MP Pauline Gardiner.

The seats of Gisborne, Hamilton East, Hamilton West, Hastings, Horowhenua, Invercargill, Lyttelton, Manawatu, Miramar, New Plymouth, Onehunga, Otara, Roskill, Te Atatu, Timaru, Titirangi, Tongariro, Wanganui and West Coast were won from the National Party by Labour challengers. Seventeen of these seats (Gisborne, Hamilton East, Hamilton West, Hastings, Horowhenua, Lyttelton, Manawatu, Miramar, New Plymouth, Onehunga, Otara, Roskill, Te Atatu, Titirangi, Tongariro, Wanganui & the West Coast) had been won by National from Labour in 1990, so were one-term National seats.

- The seat of Auckland Central was won from the Labour Party by an Alliance challenger. The challenger was Sandra Lee and the defeated incumbent was Richard Prebble.
- The seat of Northern Maori was won from the Labour Party by a New Zealand First challenger. The challenger was Tau Henare and the defeated incumbent was Bruce Gregory.
- The seat of Awarua passed from an incumbent National MP to a new National MP.
- The seat of Pencarrow passed from an incumbent Labour MP to a new Labour MP.

== Post-election events ==
A number of local by-elections were required due to the resignation of incumbent local body politicians following their election to Parliament:

- A by-election to the Auckland City Council was caused after Hauraki Gulf Islands Ward councillor Sandra Lee resigned her seat after she was elected MP for Auckland Central, necessitating a by-election to fill the council vacancy. The by-election was won by Gordon Hodson.
