= Tea tape scandal =

Political scandal in New Zealand

John Key	John Banks

The tea tape scandal was an incident involving the New Zealand Prime Minister and National Party leader John Key and ACT Party candidate John Banks during the New Zealand general election campaign in 2011. Their meeting in an Auckland café on 11 November 2011, two weeks before election day, was seen as a symbolic endorsement of Banks as the National Party's favoured candidate for the Epsom electorate. After they had sat together publicly for some time, news media personnel were asked to leave. A journalist, Bradley Ambrose, left his recording device behind, and subsequently gave the recording of the politicians' conversation to the Herald on Sunday newspaper, which declined to publish it. The recording allegedly contained comments about the leadership of ACT and disparaging remarks about elderly New Zealand First supporters.

Key and Banks considered that their private conversation had been recorded illegally. Key and the National Party said that it appeared that the Herald had deliberately recorded the conversation, and described it as "News of the World-style tactics", however journalists argued that the recording was in the public interest and should therefore be released. Following a police complaint laid by Key, search warrants were issued by police to media outlets to obtain all unreleased media involving the taping.

In March 2012 Ambrose wrote a letter to Key and Banks expressing regret that he had released the recording to the newspaper, and the police decided to issue a warning rather than prosecute.

The recording was leaked online on 26 January 2012.

== Background ==
In the New Zealand electoral system a party can be represented in Parliament if they achieve either 5% of the party vote, or win an electorate seat on a first past the post basis. At the time that this meeting took place the ACT Party was polling poorly, so it was in the National Party's interest that ACT (as a traditional coalition partner with National) win the Epsom seat. To have the Prime Minister (a National Party Member of Parliament) have tea with the ACT candidate was intended to endorse Banks' candidacy in the electorate.

The recording, made by freelance cameraman Bradley Ambrose at the Urban Cafe in the suburb of Newmarket, was given to the Herald on Sunday. 3 News also obtained copies of the recording. Neither organisation published the recording.

There is speculation that the two politicians were discussing issues related to ACT New Zealand's leadership, and New Zealand First leader Winston Peters claims John Key insulted New Zealand First voters, by saying that they were "dying off".

Ambrose maintains he inadvertently left the recording device on the table, and was unable to retrieve it when media were ordered to leave the venue. National Party campaign chairman Steven Joyce said that the recording appeared to have been deliberately arranged by the Herald on Sunday, and described it as "UK-style News of the World tabloid tactics".

The scandal became known as "the teapot tapes", a term coined by the New Zealand Listener's election live blog.

Labour leader Phil Goff called the recording a "dodgy conversation between two people trying to manipulate a minor party". Referring to the ACT Party, he said, "That party is supported by less than one percent, people don’t want them there."

== Analysis ==
Mark Lewis, a lawyer representing victims of the News International phone hacking scandal defended the recording as "good journalism" and said it was "in no way comparable to the News of the World scandal". This view was shared by University of Canterbury journalism lecturer Jim Tully, who also stated he believed the contents of the conversation should be released in the public interest.

Key defended the decision to involve police, calling the issue "the start of a slippery slope":

What happens if a couple of high profile New Zealanders have a conversation about their son or their daughter being suicidal - a Sunday paper reports that and that child takes their own life. We're at the start of a slippery slope here and I for one am going to stand up and ask the police to investigate it.

These comments were described as "unfortunate and totally wrong" by the Media Freedom Committee, which represents New Zealand media organisations. They said that the release of the recording in this case would not lead to much wider publication of private conversations.

The context in which this conversation was held (as part of an election media conference, to which media were welcome) makes some legal bloggers question whether this meeting could be considered private. Steven Price is so confident of this that his blog openly publishes a link to a leaked copy of the recording.

== Police intervention ==
John Key laid a complaint about the incident with the New Zealand Police. The Police said that making the recording may have been an offence under the Crimes Act. They began contacting 3 News, Radio New Zealand, TVNZ and The Herald on Sunday requesting unpublished information be handed over. Media outlets were informed that police would seek a search warrant.

Ambrose applied for a High Court declaration that the recording was not private and could therefore be published, but the judge declined to rule, saying that it would not be appropriate to make such a declaration in advance of a police investigation.

In March 2012 the police announced that they had issued Ambrose with a warning but would not be prosecuting as there was not sufficient public interest in the matter going to court. They said that their opinion was that the conversation was private and that the recording was at least reckless and probably was intentional. Ambrose wrote a letter to John Banks and John Key saying that the recording was not intentional, and expressing regret that he had released the tape to the Herald on Sunday. The police said that this letter was a factor in the decision not to press charges. Ambrose's lawyer said that he believed that no criminal offence had been committed, and that if the police had a strong case they would have proceeded.

Ambrose later asked for an apology from the Prime Minister, but it never came.

== Aftermath ==
John Banks won the Epsom electorate vote for ACT with a margin of 2,261 over the National Party candidate. However, ACT gained only 1.07 percent of the party vote, meaning the party was only awarded one seat, filled by Banks.

Political experts including Joe Atkinson and Jon Johannson credit the tea tape scandal for the re-entry of Winston Peters and his New Zealand First party into Parliament. New Zealand First was ousted at the 2008 general election because it failed to reach the 5% party vote threshold.

The tape was leaked on 26 January 2012. The leak forced Key to change his phone number, which was audible on the tape.

In September 2012, the china used in the incident was put up for auction.

A Massey University study released in November 2012 suggested newspaper coverage was favourable towards National and John Key prior to the scandal. In the month leading up to the election, the big four newspapers in New Zealand – The New Zealand Herald, the Herald on Sunday, The Dominion Post and The Sunday Star-Times – printed 72 percent more photos of Key than his opponent, Phil Goff, and devoted twice as many column inches of text coverage. This changed however, after the tea tape scandal, after which no positive images of Key were printed.

=== Defamation case ===
More than three years after the initial scandal, cameraman Bradley Ambrose sued John Key for $1.25M, claiming three separate acts of defamation in the days and week following the recording being made. Documents filed for Key's defence stated that the comments were his true and honest opinion.

The defamation case was settled out of court in March 2016. The settlement amount remains confidential. John Key now accepts that Ambrose did not act deliberately or otherwise behave improperly.
