= Ruthanasia =

New Zealand free-market policies 1990–93

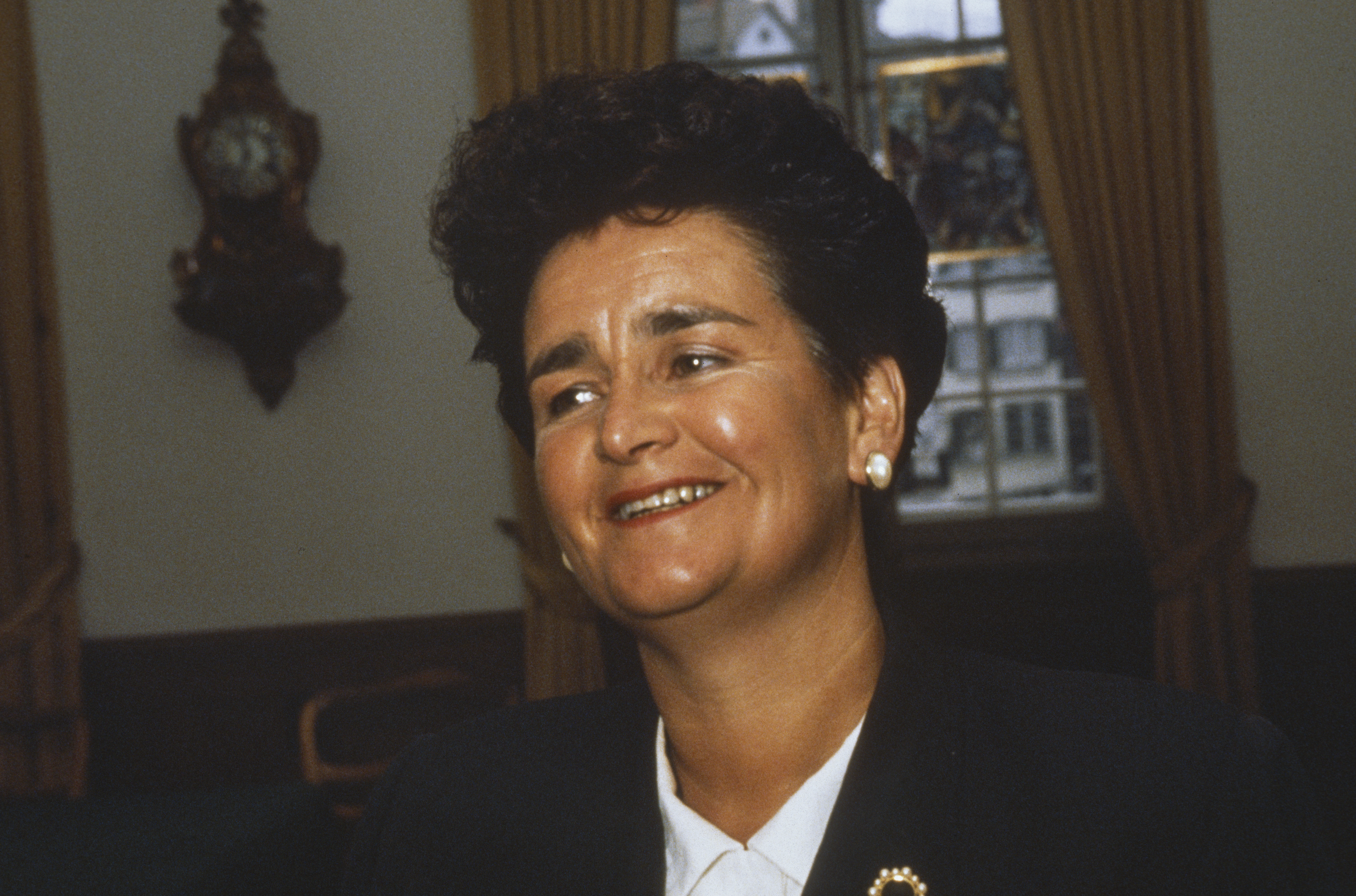
Ruth Richardson, the eponym of "Ruthanasia", in 1991

Ruthanasia, a portmanteau of "Ruth" and "euthanasia", is the pejorative name (typically used by opponents) given to the period of free-market policies conducted during the first term of the fourth National government in New Zealand, from 1990 to 1993. As the first period of reform from 1984 to 1990 was known as Rogernomics after the Labour Party Minister of Finance, Roger Douglas, so the second period became known as "Ruthanasia", after the National Party's Minister of Finance, Ruth Richardson.

== Background ==
Ruthanasia and Rogernomics can be viewed as complementary reform packages implemented by successive governments, which were both aimed at liberalising the New Zealand economy. The packages came after a period of intense protectionism and fiscal control, particularly under the administration of Robert Muldoon's National government between 1975 and 1984. Muldoon, who simultaneously held the posts of Prime Minister and Minister of Finance, implemented a three-year wage and price freeze in a protectonist attempt to suppress rampant inflation.

== Conflict with manifesto ==
Ruthanasia was controversial as the National Party had fought the 1990 election on a manifesto promising "The Decent Society" and implicitly repudiating the radicalism of the Fourth Labour Government.

The new Prime Minister, Jim Bolger, defended the move on the grounds that he had been badly misled in the run-up to the 1990 election as to the actual state of the New Zealand economy. He was told by officials on Sunday afternoon, the day after the election, of two unrelated financial crises: the country's broke .... and the largest bank .... was bankrupt. Bolger said that his "electoral honeymoon lasted seventeen hours". So he immediately summoned Don McKinnon, Bill Birch and Ruth Richardson to Wellington. The partly state-owned Bank of New Zealand required an immediate injection of capital to avoid insolvency as a result of the poor performance of a NZ$2.8bn loan portfolio in Australia. The bank held 40 per cent of the commercial paper (loans to businesses) in New Zealand.

Secondly; the outgoing finance minister David Caygill's projection of a modest fiscal surplus was inaccurate, and the country instead faced a fiscal deficit of NZ$3.7bn (4.8%) for 1991–92 if current fiscal policies continued. Current net public debt was 52% of GDP (43% after Telecom sale).

== Focus ==
Where Roger Douglas had deregulated the industrial, financial, fiscal and agricultural sectors of the New Zealand economy, Ruth Richardson, under the auspices of a National (predominantly conservative) administration, was able to focus on social services and labour relations. These were sensitive areas where the preceding Labour administration had rejected the need for changes due to the impact they could have on their traditional working class constituency.

Richardson and the then Minister of Social Welfare, Jenny Shipley, immediately reformed the Social Welfare programme in the "Mother of all Budgets" by reducing available unemployment, sickness and welfare benefits across the board. In 1991, the National government enacted the Employment Contracts Act (ECA), which effectively demolished New Zealand's post-war industrial relations framework, replacing collective bargaining and compulsory union membership in many sectors with the concept of the individual employment contract. Whilst the ECA did not directly address unions, the practical effect of removing the requirement for employees to be members, and allowing those employees who did want union membership to choose which union they wished to join, dramatically reduced the bargaining position of the unions in the New Zealand economy. This reform of labour laws had already been outlined in the 1990 National manifesto.

Ken Douglas, then president of the New Zealand Council of Trade Unions, recalled in the 1996 documentary Revolution:

The Employment Contracts Act was deliberately intended to individualise the employment relationship. It was a natural outcome of the ideological propaganda of rugged individualism, of self-interest and greed and the appeal to individuals that you could find better for you by climbing over the tops of your colleagues, your mates, and so on. Ruth Richardson was very clear, very blunt, very honest about its purpose. It was to achieve a dramatic lowering of wages, very, very quickly.

Roger Douglas, minister of finance in the preceding fourth Labour government, said (after his retirement from politics):

I think the labour market changes in 1990 were first class. I think, unfortunately, Caygill and the Labour party had let the fiscal situation slip from where it was in 1988 and Ruth put that back on the road.

"Ruthanasia" came to an end after the 1993 election, when National's majority was reduced from 18 (out of 99 seats) to 1. Jim Bolger responded by replacing Richardson with Bill Birch. Bolger then acknowledged both the benefits and unpopularity of Ruthanasia in his televised announcement of Richardson's removal:

I do not believe it would be too far from the truth if I put it something like this. We, the New Zealand people, accept that our nation had to change. The process was painful but the benefits are now apparent and must be retained. However, we believe the time has come to recognize the big moves are behind us and a different style of management is called for.

== Long-term consequences: 1993–2008 ==
Internal party ideological tensions also led to the secession of Winston Peters from the National Party caucus and the formation of New Zealand First in 1993. Peters was viewed as an acolyte of Rob Muldoon's protectionist economic policies and had a substantial support base amongst New Zealand's senior citizens and their related lobby organisations.

Peters' erstwhile prominence was due to the other consequence of Roger Douglas and Ruth Richardson's New Right economic policies, which fuelled a movement for electoral reform in New Zealand after Sir Geoffrey Palmer convened a Royal Commission on the Electoral System in 1985–1986. In two electoral reform referendums, the general public endorsed the Mixed Member Proportional electoral system as a response to what they perceived as an unaccountable New Right government. Jim Bolger believes that, had his government not instituted such unpopular policy prescriptions, MMP may not have passed.

After Richardson's resignation, National retained power for six more years against a divided Labour Party and splintered opposition, hampered by its own legacy of economic retrenchment. While several MPs seceded to form non-viable centre-right satellite parties before the 1996 general election National retained power by going into coalition with Winston Peters and New Zealand First. It eventually proved unpopular, and party rightists launched a coup against Jim Bolger in December 1997. As a consequence, Peters abandoned the National/New Zealand First coalition, splitting his party. National then governed for a further year, with the support of post-split ex-New Zealand First MPs, but the 1999 general election saw Helen Clark lead a centre-left coalition to victory. She would remain Prime Minister for most of the next decade, as National was paralysed by factional infighting over ideology and direction. When National won office again after the 2008 general election, National sought to shift towards the centre and projected an image that it had eschewed "radical" New Right industrial relations and welfare reform. Jettisoning Richardson's legacy.

As for Richardson herself, she became a member of ACT New Zealand, her philosophical successors.

A 2015 Treasury report said that inequality in New Zealand increased in the 1980s and 1990s but has been stable for the last 20 years although another 2015 article said that New Zealand's rate of rise of inequality had been the highest in the OECD, and that New Zealand's inequality had previously been low by OECD standards. The 1991 budget had profound social effects, child poverty rose from 15% in 1990 to 29% in 1994 while violent crime peaked between 1990 and 1997. Income inequality also accelerated, New Zealand's GINI index rose from 0.30 in 1990 to 0.33 in 1996 and thereafter 0.34 at the turn of the century. Poorer New Zealanders saw their standard of living fall from their 1984 level. Unemployment also remained high for much of the decade, from 11% in 1991 to 6% in 1996 and then up again to 8% following the Asian Financial Crisis.

== See also ==
- Mother of all Budgets – Nickname given to the 1991 New Zealand budget
- Economy of New Zealand
- Politics of New Zealand
- September 2022 United Kingdom mini-budget
- Hungarian Bokros package
- Polish Balcerowicz Plan
