= Ruth Richardson =

New Zealand politician

The Honourable Ruth Richardson CNZM
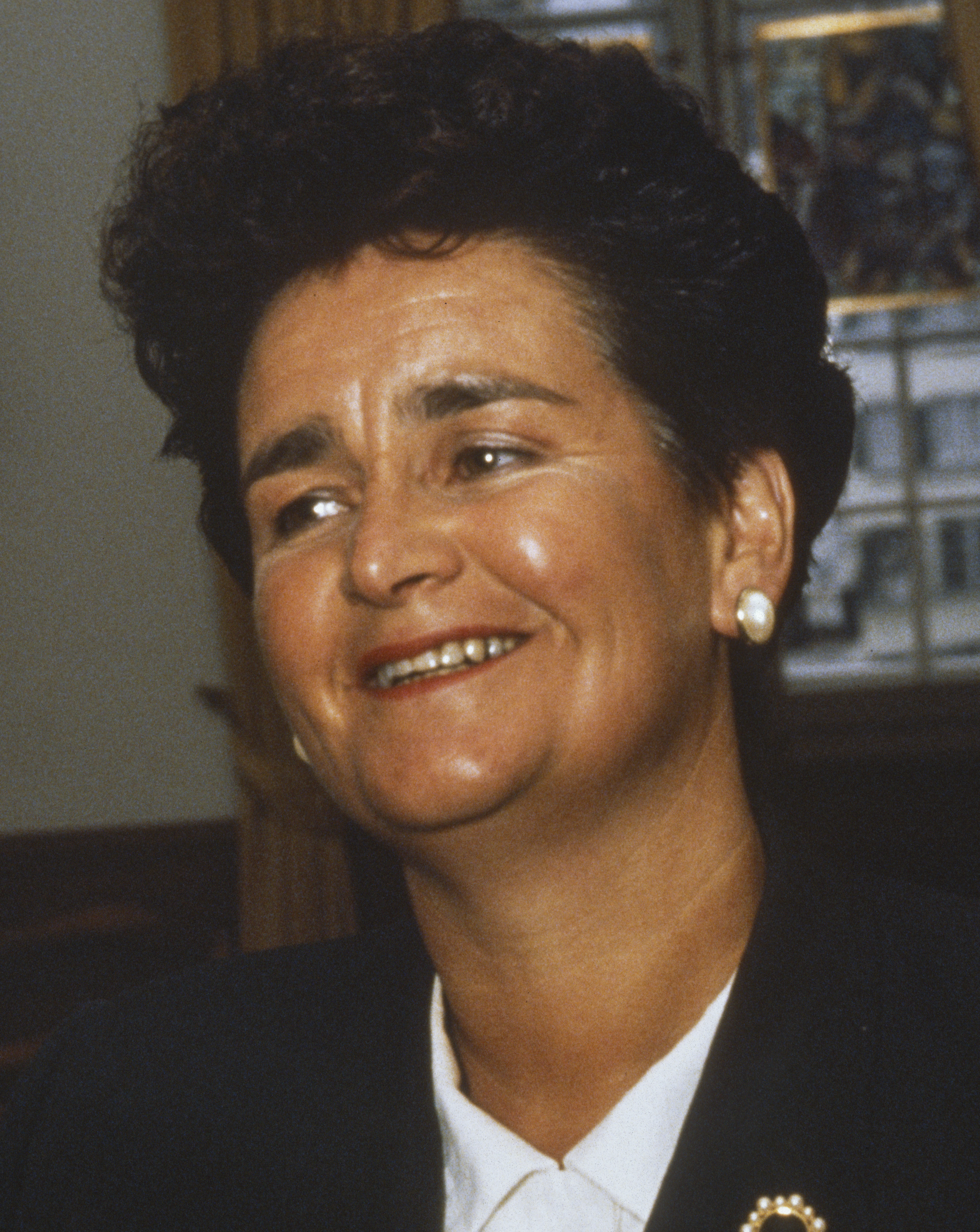
- Richardson in 1991

37th Minister of Finance
- In office 2 November 1990 – 29 November 1993
- Prime Minister: Jim Bolger
- Preceded by: David Caygill
- Succeeded by: Bill Birch

Member of the New Zealand Parliament for Selwyn
- In office 28 November 1981 – 18 July 1994
- Preceded by: Colin McLachlan
- Succeeded by: David Carter

Personal details
- Born: 13 December 1950 (age 75) Taranaki, New Zealand
- Party: National
- Relations: George Pearce (great-grandfather)

Ruth Margaret Richardson CNZM (born 13 December 1950) is a retired New Zealand politician of the National Party who served as Minister of Finance from 1990 to 1993. Her 1991 budget, which she dubbed the "Mother of all Budgets", formed the catalyst for her party's economic reforms known in the media as "Ruthanasia".

Richardson was a lawyer by profession. She was elected as the Member of Parliament (MP) for Selwyn in 1981. Following the National Party victory in the 1990 election, Richardson was appointed as Finance Minister in the fourth National Government. She supported and carried on the free-market reforms initiated by the preceding Labour Government, and extended them in a significant way with the Fiscal Responsibility Act 1994. Richardon's economic restructuring, including privatisation of state assets and cuts to social welfare, contributed to New Zealand emerging from its fiscal problems. However, critics have noted the wide-ranging effects on New Zealand's social fabric including child poverty and wealth inequality, which were both severely exacerbated.

Richardson was dismissed as Finance Minister following the 1993 election; she resigned from Parliament in 1994. She later joined ACT New Zealand.

== Early life ==
Richardson was born in southern Taranaki on 13 December 1950. Her family had a long history in the area, and her great-grandfather George Pearce had served as MP for Patea from 1908 to 1919. Her father was active in the National Party's Patea branch. Richardson was brought up as a Roman Catholic, and after finishing primary school, was sent to Sacred Heart College, a Catholic girls' high school in Wanganui.

Richardson decided on a career in Parliament at an early age, before she even left high school. Sir Roy Jack, a National Party MP and a friend of her family, advised her to study law, which she did. Richardson gained a law degree from the University of Canterbury. After graduating, she worked for the Department of Justice. In 1975, Richardson married Andrew Wright, a colleague from the Department.

Richardson's first attempt to break into politics came when she unsuccessfully challenged Sir Roy Jack for the National Party nomination in the 1975 election. His Waimarino electorate was merged into Rangitikei because of post-census boundary changes. Besides alienating her from her old mentor, she also created considerable irritation in the higher ranks of the party. National had long frowned on challenges to sitting MPs who sought renomination, and was especially hostile when the challenge was made against long-serving MPs such as Jack. George Chapman, who chaired the selection, said, "The tensions were tremendous, but Roy was finally confirmed as the candidate." She was a member of the non-partisan political lobby organisation the Women's Electoral Lobby.

In 1978, Richardson contested the National Party's nomination for the Tasman seat. She won the nomination, but in the 1978 election itself, she failed to defeat incumbent Labour MP Bill Rowling (who was leader of his party at the time). In 1980, she was invited to contest the nomination for Selwyn, a National safe seat just outside Christchurch which was held by retiring MP Colin McLachlan. She won the nomination, and in the 1981 election, was elected to Parliament.

== Early parliamentary career ==
New Zealand Parliament
Years	Term	Electorate	Party
1981–1984	40th	Selwyn	National
1984–1987	41st	Selwyn	National
1987–1990	42nd	Selwyn	National
1990–1993	43rd	Selwyn	National
1993–1994	44th	Selwyn	National

Richardson was influenced by the neo-liberal thought of Milton Friedman and Friedrich Hayek. She quickly distinguished herself in the National Party caucus as a supporter of free market economics, privatisation, and trade liberalisation. This contrasted considerably with the views held by National Party Prime Minister Robert Muldoon, who favoured an interventionist approach based on significant overseas borrowing. Richardson's focus on financial matters was itself a cause for comment, as many female MPs (particularly in the National Party) had confined themselves to matters such as health and social welfare.

When National lost the 1984 election, Richardson became a member of the Opposition. Richardson stood out in National's caucus for her strong support of the radical economic reforms of the Labour Party's new Finance Minister, Roger Douglas. These reforms, sometimes known as "Rogernomics", involved the privatisation of state assets, the removal of tariffs and subsidies, and applying monetarism to control inflation. These reforms were seen by many Labour as against traditional Labour policy, but were also opposed by the more conservative wings of the National Party. Particularly hostile were followers of Muldoon, a traditionalist conservative who opposed free market reforms as undermining state authority.

Shortly after National lost government, Jim McLay replaced Muldoon as leader of the National Party and he appointed Richardson education spokesperson. In February 1986 there was a considerable rearrangement of responsibilities in the opposition. People such as Bill Birch and George Gair, who McLay associated with the Muldoon era, were demoted. They were replaced by newer MPs, such as Richardson and Simon Upton, who McLay believed would help revitalise the party. This move proved fatal to McLay personally, however, as the sacked Birch and Gair allied themselves with McLay's rival, Jim Bolger. Bolger ousted McLay and became party leader.

The change in leadership was damaging for Richardson, as Bolger (and many of his allies) strongly disliked her. This dislike was due to three main factors: anger at McLay's "favouritism" towards her, dislike of her advocacy for radical free-market economic policies, and dislike of her personality (which many colleagues found "abrasive" and "condescending"). When George Gair (elevated for his role in Bolger's rise to power) retired from the position of deputy leader, Richardson stepped forward for the position. Bolger, however, made it clear that he strongly opposed Richardson's candidacy, instead throwing his support behind Don McKinnon. McKinnon narrowly defeated Richardson by just one vote and became deputy leader.

Bolger did, however, make Richardson the party's spokesperson on finance in recognition of her strong showing for the deputy leadership. This was an attempt to pacify Richardson and her supporters, rather than an expression of confidence in her – it was well known that Bolger himself preferred the more cautious Birch for the finance role. The move to defuse tension was only partially successful, and hostility between supporters of Bolger and supporters of Richardson remained. Many National politicians believed that Richardson sought to replace Bolger as leader, but even if Bolger was vulnerable, the two factions that opposed him (one led by Richardson and the other led by Winston Peters) were unwilling to cooperate. Bolger's leadership remained secure, and when his popularity rose, the window of opportunity was lost.

Richardson gave birth during a recess in the 1980s, she had a room in Parliament set aside for her to breastfeed in (although a creche was not established until the 1990s).

== Minister of Finance ==
When National came to power in the 1990 election, Richardson had enough support within the party to be made Minister of Finance, though Bolger preferred Bill Birch for the post. Many people believed that the National Party would adopt more cautious, conservative policies than the radical Labour government. On coming to office, however, the new Government was confronted with a much worse fiscal and economic position than the out-going Government had disclosed. In particular, the state-owned Bank of New Zealand required a multimillion-dollar recapitalization. The forecast budget surplus was quickly revised, upon National coming into office, to a large budget deficit.

=== Economic and Social Initiative ===
As part of the December 1990 ‘Economic and Social Initiative’ statement, welfare benefits were substantially reduced. Announced on 19 December 1990 and taking effect from 1 April 1991, the changes included weekly cuts of $14 to the Unemployment Benefit, up to $25 for recipients aged 18-24, $28 to the Domestic Purposes Benefit, and $27 to the Sickness Benefit. The abolition of the Family Benefit cut a further $6 per week from family incomes, while single parents under 18 were no longer eligible for the Domestic Purposes Benefit. Following a backbench revolt over proposed cuts to Carer’s Benefit, Richardson shrank from cutting the Invalids Benefit. In effect, this was a mini-budget than a budget statement. GP subsidies were also reduced, prescription drug fees rose, and the government abandoned a GP contract scheme introduced by the previous Labour government to reduce doctors fees. The fact National had not forshadowed such a drastic welfare reform caused dismay among many party supporters. Several notable National MP's, such as Michael Laws, Cam Campion, Gilbert Myles, and Hamish MacIntyre crossed the floor to vote against the government on several occasions.

=== Mother of all Budgets ===
On 30 July 1991, Richardson delivered what became known as the “Mother of all Budgets”. The phrase originated from an offhand remark to a journalist making a phone inquiry prior to its release, in which she stated it would be "the mother of all budgets". The comment was captured by a Television New Zealand news camera and quickly became associated with the harshness of the National government's economic policies. The term would come to haunt her career.

The 1991 budget was no less far-reaching than the 19 December 1990 package. Reforms in tertiary education owed nothing to National's 1990 election commitments. Despite a promise to abolish tertiary fees entirely, they were retained and effectively deregulated, allowing institutions to set their own fee levels. The public health system underwent a major restructuring, with a separation between funding and provision. Area Health Boards were abolished and replaced by Crown Health Enterprises, while newly established Regional Health Authorities purchased health services under contract to the Crown. This effectively corporatised the public health system. A $50 overnight charge schedule was introduced for persons using the public hospital system. In housing, the government introduced market rents for state housing tenants. This resulted in soaring rents for many tenants, which in some cases tripled. A contuation of asset sales, particularly the sale of New Zealand Rail, attracted further criticism. In October 1991, Bolger sacked Minister of Māori Affairs Winston Peters after he openly condemned government policy. Peters had been a primary opponent of Richardson.

The most controversial issue for the National government, however, was retirement income. In 1989, the previous Labour government had introduced a Guaranteed Retirement Income (GRI), which abolished the 80% average national income threshold, indexing it to prices and wages. In practice, this was a modified continuation of the previous National Superannuation scheme. In 1985, Labour had introduced a Superannuation Surtax to claw back some of the entitlement from retirees. National pledged to abolish the surtax in the 1990 election, promising to do so within the first 100 days. Instead, National abolished the surtax, but introduce an abatement scheme and included GRI in the Social Security Act. This effectively transformed GRI into a state benefit, causing outrage across the country. After a series of concessions, National abandoned the policy, with one exception: the Surtax returned, was increased from 20% to 25%, and the exemption lowered. This episode soon became emblematic of the perceived dogmatic extremism of Richardson and cost the government dearly.

The radicalism of Richardson brought her into conflict with several National ministers. Tax policy was one area where Richardson and the more moderate members of Cabinet failed to even agree on basics. In early 1993, Bolger personally summoned Richardson and said he intended to split the roles of Minister of Finance into two roles, Treasurer and Minister of Finance. Richardson later said she gave Bolger "chapter and verse" and rejected the idea outright. She in particular came into conflict with Minister of Revenue Wyatt Creech, who opposed much of her agenda. These tensions would remain unresolved until after the 1993 election, whereupon Bolger removed her from the portfolio.

Although National was re-elected in the 1993 election, it was by the narrowest of margins (one seat) and many people within the party believed that Richardson's presence was damaging to National. In addition, Bolger and his allies had still not been reconciled with her. In order to partially reflect the strong discontent in the electorate with the reform process (National arguably only won because the opposition vote was split between three parties) Richardson lost her role as Minister of Finance to Birch, and was offered the role of Minister of Justice. Richardson refused, preferring to take a role on the back-benches. Soon afterward, she decided to leave Parliament altogether, forcing a by-election. In 1993, Richardson was awarded the New Zealand Suffrage Centennial Medal.

=== Legacy ===
Though her period as Finance Minister was comparatively short, Richardson's legacy in subjects such as fiscal responsibility and economic liberty is large. Many of the reforms she championed have endured and remain an example for a modern Public Financial Management. With the first public sector balance sheet produced it was used to avoid a double down-grade to the Sovereign credit rating. New Zealand remains the only country that has introduced modern accounting and integrated its balance sheet with the budget, as a tool for its budgeting, appropriations, and financial reporting. Since these public sector reforms, New Zealand has achieved and maintained significantly positive net worth, notwithstanding several shocks to the economy, including the 2008 financial crisis and the Christchurch earthquake in 2011, where most comparable governments like Australia and Canada, or larger countries such as the UK and US, have a negative net worth.

The 2021 New Zealand budget presented by the Sixth Labour Government boosted levels for beneficiaries by the highest amount in decades in what was framed as a direct response to Richardson's 1991 "Mother of all Budgets" by largely restoring benefit levels. During the budget day speech, finance minister Grant Robertson said that it had been 30 years since the 1991 budget and that the 2021 budget would "address the most inequitable of the changes made 30 years ago." Prime Minister Jacinda Ardern commented that "On too many occasions in New Zealand's history, the changes that leave an indelible mark on the next generation do so for the wrong reason." In response to the 1991 budget's legacy Richardson defended it, by stating: "My budget was driven by a desire to lift economic growth and to make employment attractive." The cut in major benefits in the 1991 budget had long-lasting effects on welfare and poverty in New Zealand. Benefits were effectively not raised until a small increase in 2016 under the Fifth National Government by finance minister Bill English, with the 2020 and 2021 budgets largely restoring the pre-1991 levels. Richardson's cut in benefits is largely seen as having corresponded with an increase in long term general poverty and wealth inequality in New Zealand.

== Subsequent career ==
Richardson resigned from parliament in the following year, being replaced by David Carter as MP by the 1994 Selwyn by-election.

She continued to be involved in politics through her advocacy of the ACT New Zealand party. ACT, established by Roger Douglas and his allies, promotes policies very close to those of Richardson. She has also a number of roles related to business and corporate governance, and served on a number of corporate boards. She is also a member of the Mont Pelerin Society, founded by economist Friedrich Hayek.

The University of Canterbury gave her an honorary Doctor of Commerce degree in 2011.

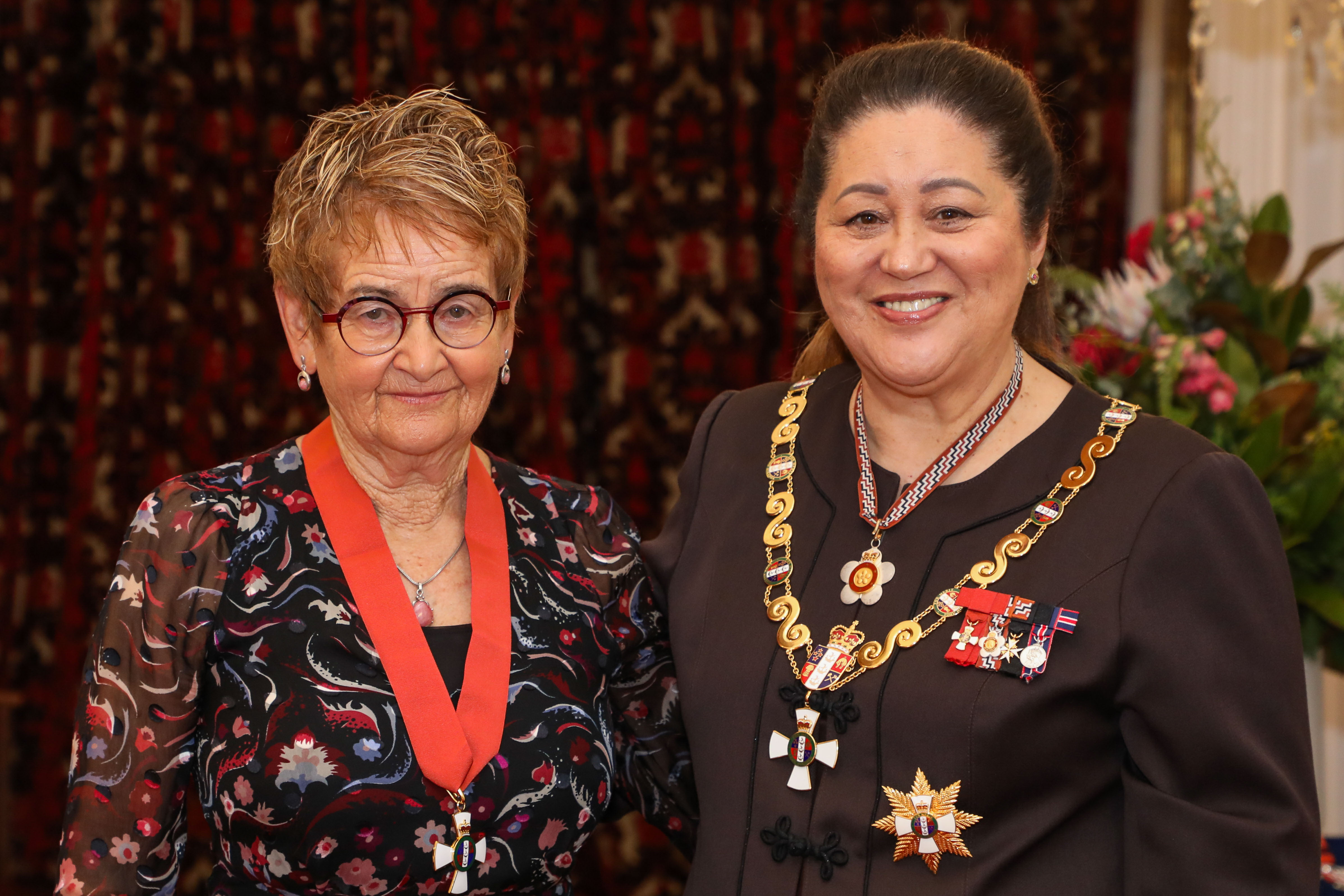
Richardson (left) in 2025, after her investiture as a Companion of the New Zealand Order of Merit by the governor-general, Dame Cindy Kiro, at Government House, Wellington, on 20 September 2025

In the 2025 King’s Birthday Honours, Richardson was appointed a Companion of the New Zealand Order of Merit, for services as a Member of Parliament and to governance.

In June 2025 Richardson was appointed as the chairperson of the tax pressure group New Zealand Taxpayers' Union. In December 2025, the Taxpayers' Union launched a pressure campaign attacking the financial management record of Finance Minister Nicola Willis; distributing a package fudge titled "Nicola Fudge Co.," with an image of Willis with the slogan "A treat today - A tax tomorrow." On 9 December, Willis challenged Richardson to a debate in Parliament on the Government's financial management. In response, Richardson defended her group's pressure campaign, stating that they were holding Willis to account for the country's structural fiscal deficit. Following disagreements about the host and venue for the debate, Richardson pulled out of the debate on 16 December, stating the she would not be a "party to a circus or a sideshow designed to distract from fiscal failure." In response, Willis accused the Taxpayers' Union of being unwilling to show up for the debate and defended the Government's financial management.

== See also ==
- Fourth National Government of New Zealand

== Sources ==
- Boston, Jonathan; Levine, Stephen; Roberts, Nigel (1996). New Zealand Under MMP: A New Politics?. Auckland University Press. ISBN 978-1-86940-138-2.
- Chapman, George (1980). The Years of Lightning. Wellington: AH & AW Reed. ISBN 0-589-01346-7.
- Stringer, John (1990). 1990 Parliamentary Candidates for the New Zealand National Party. New Zealand National Party.
- Trotter, Chris (2010). No Left Turn: The Distortion of New Zealand's History By Greed, Bigotry and Right-wing Politics. Penguin Random House New Zealand Limited. ISBN 978-1-86979-085-1.

New Zealand Parliament
Preceded by Colin McLachlan	Member of Parliament for Selwyn; 1981–1994	Succeeded by David Carter
Political offices
Preceded by David Caygill	Minister of Finance; 1990–1993	Succeeded by Bill Birch
Preceded by David Caygill	Minister in charge of Earthquake and War Damage Commission; 1990–1993	Portfolio abolished
