= Social Credit-NZ =

New Zealand political party

- Founder: Bruce Beetham
- Founded: 17 July 1988
- Dissolved: 25 January 1993; 33 years ago
- Split from: New Zealand Democratic Party
- Merged into: New Zealand Coalition
- Ideology: Social credit
- Political position: Centre-left

The Social Credit-NZ party was a political party in New Zealand which split from the New Zealand Democratic Party in 1988.

== History ==
In 1986, the Social Credit Party changed its name to the Democratic Party. Many activists in the party were uneasy with the rebranding, fearing that the party would jettison the social credit monetary policies that had always been central to the party since its creation in 1953. In the 1987 election, the renamed party lost all their seats. Former Social Credit Party leader Bruce Beetham blamed changes in leadership and party name for the failure. He was critical of the party leadership and campaign stating, if run well, it should have retained East Coast Bays and Pakuranga as well as pick up both Rangitikei and Wanganui.

In July 1988, Beetham established Social Credit-NZ after coming to the belief that the Democratic Party was no longer a true social credit based party. Beetham and party president Alan Shaw said the new party would offer an alternative to interventionist and free-market policies by resurrecting original social credit economic ideas. At its launch, the party said it intended to contest every electorate at the 1990 election and already had 45 members lined up to contest electorates. Few rated the party as having much chance of electoral success and media were quick to compare it with the New Democratic Party, a previous splinter social credit party in 1972, which quickly vanished. At the 1990 election, the party fielded 68 candidates and won 17,897 votes, only 0.98% of the total compared to the Democrats' 30,455 (1.67%).

In March 1991, Beetham retired from the leadership of the party. He was replaced by Martin Hine, an Auckland lawyer, who had been a Social Credit candidate in Auckland Central and Napier in 1978 and 1981 respectively. Beetham remained the party spokesperson on finance. Shaw also resigned as president and was replaced with Heather Maloney. As leader, Hine attempted to conciliate with the Democrats, even going as far as to join the Democratic Party to negotiate a merger. His application for membership was treated with suspicion by the Democrats however. Hine resigned as leader after just nine months; he announced his resignation on 13 November 1991, called for reunification with the Democrats and announced he would remain a member only of the Democrats. Beetham resumed the leadership of the party which continued on as more of pressure group organisation dedicated to furthering Social Credit monetary aims and financial principles.

Eventually the remaining members of the party ended up as part of a supposedly centrist party known as the New Zealand Coalition after joining together with the remnants of the New Zealand Party and the United NZ Party.

In 2018, the Democratic Party changed its name back to the Social Credit Party.

== Electoral results ==
Election	Candidates	# of seats won	Total votes	% of popular vote
1990	68	0 / 80	17,897	0.98%

The party also fielded a candidate at the 1992 Tamaki by-election, Colin Maloney, who won 34 votes (0.2%). After the 1993 merger, a social crediter, Kieron Daok, was the New Zealand Coalition candidate in the 1994 Selwyn by-election. Daok finished 10th out of 11 candidates with 10 votes (or 0.05% of the vote).

== See also ==
- Social Credit Party (New Zealand)
