= 2021 New Zealand budget =

Government budget for fiscal year 2021/22

- Submitted by: Grant Robertson
- Presented: 20 May 2021
- Country: New Zealand
- Parliament: 53rd
- Party: Labour
- Deficit: ▼$15.1 billion
- Website: Budget 2021

Budget 2021 is the New Zealand budget for fiscal year 2021/22, presented to the House of Representatives by Finance Minister Grant Robertson on 20 May 2021 as the fourth budget presented by the Sixth Labour Government. This budget occurs after a year of several lockdowns due to the COVID-19 pandemic in New Zealand and focuses on economic recovery.

== Background ==
The budget is for the fiscal year from 1 July 2021 to 30 June 2022. This is the fourth budget of the Sixth Labour Government and the first budget of Labour's second term in office, in which they have a parliamentary majority, making this the first budget where the Labour Party has been the sole party behind the creation of the budget.

The impact of COVID-19 on the economy has led to an increase in government borrowing, with government debt expected to hit NZ$166.2 billion by the end of the 2020/21 fiscal year; before the pandemic it was at $57.7 billion. The 2020/21 fiscal year ends with a forecasted budget deficit of $21.6 billion.

The operating allowance for this budget is $3.8 billion per year.

== Major announcements ==
=== Education ===
A total of $1.4 billion will be allocated over four years to operational funding for schools and early learning centres.

- $170 million pay boost over four years for early childhood teachers
- $185 million operating budget and $53 million capital for schools and early learning centres to establish an education service agency to support schools
- $53 million for a one-off funding package for maintenance and upgrades at state-integrated schools

=== Environment ===
- $67.4 million over four years towards a carbon-neutral Government
- $300 million for investment in low-emissions technologies

=== Health ===
A total of $4.7 billion allocated to health:

- Increases primary care funding by $46.7 million per year
- $1.4 billion allocated for the country's vaccination programme
- $2.7 billion for district health boards over four years
- $200 million increase over four years for Pharmac
- $486 million for replacing district health boards with a central Health New Zealand authority
  - Includes $98 million to establish the Māori Health Authority
- $119 million for women’s health
- $243 million operation budget for Māori health
- $517 million for the development and running of health infrastructure
- Just under $400 million for assisting people with long-term physical, intellectual or sensory impairments
- $100 million for improving air and road ambulance services
- An extra $50 million for the Healthy Homes Initiative
- $3.8 million for Family Planning

=== Housing ===
- $380 million for Māori housing
  - To be used for building 1000 homes for Māori, including papakāinga (ancestral land) housing, affordable rentals, transitional housing, and owner-occupied housing.
  - Also includes repairs to 700 Māori-owned homes and support services
- $30 million for iwi (tribe) and Māori groups to accelerate housing projects
- Injecting $350 million from the Housing Acceleration Fund for Māori housing infrastructure

=== Infrastructure ===
- $306 million for renovating Scott Base
- $1.3 billion for KiwiRail
- $85 million for building new facilities at Hillside Engineering in Dunedin to assemble 1,500 wagons.

=== Welfare ===
A total of $3.3 billion will be allocated over four years to boost benefit rates.

- Weekly benefit rates will increase by $32–$55 by April 2022
  - First part will be all benefits increasing by $20 in July 2021
- Families with children will receive an extra $15 per adult per week
- Sole parent living support rises $36 per week
- Student support living costs will increase by $25 in April 2022
- Jobseeker benefit increases $55 per week for couples and $48 per week for single people

== Forecasts ==
The deficit is forecast to reach $2.3 billion in fiscal year 2024/25, with Net Core Crown debt forecast to go up by around $100 billion by that time, with a peak of 48% of national GDP in the 2022/23 fiscal year.

Unemployment is forecast to reach around 5.2% in June 2021 before going down to around 4.2% in 2025.

== Reactions ==
Prime Minister Jacinda Ardern stated that the budget sets New Zealand up to recover from COVID-19 and have the country "[be] stronger than when [it] entered the pandemic", a statement echoed by Social Development Minister Carmel Sepuloni. Grant Robertson stated that "this is the biggest lift in benefits in more than a generation", criticising the 1991 budget.

Green Party co-leader Marama Davidson praised the budget for increasing benefits. Māori Party co-leader Debbie Ngarewa-Packer was "cautiously optimistic" about the budget, praising the government for "accept[ing] a need to take a targeted approach rather than a universal one".

National Party and Opposition leader Judith Collins said that the Government "lacks the plan and ambition" in this budget and that it does not offer "any direction for getting the country back on track to prosperity" and that it is "setting New Zealand up to fail". ACT leader David Seymour criticised the budget, saying it "ignore[s] reality" and does not have anything for middle-class New Zealanders.

Children's Commissioner Andrew Becroft praised the budget for being a "very solid, continuing step on our journey of halving child poverty by 2028", but said there was still more to be done. Director of poverty group Council for International Development Josie Pagani says that the budget "deal[s] with some of the inequality", forecasting that this budget will lift 75 thousand children out of poverty, but did not see the changes as drastic. Economic commentator Brad Olsen stated that the budget was "underwhelming" and did not have provisions for economic growth.
