= Mother of all Budgets =

Nickname given to the 1991 New Zealand budget

The Mother of all Budgets was the nickname given to the 1991 New Zealand budget. It was the first budget delivered by the new National Party Minister of Finance Ruth Richardson and formed the catalyst of her economic reforms known in the media as "Ruthanasia".

== Background ==
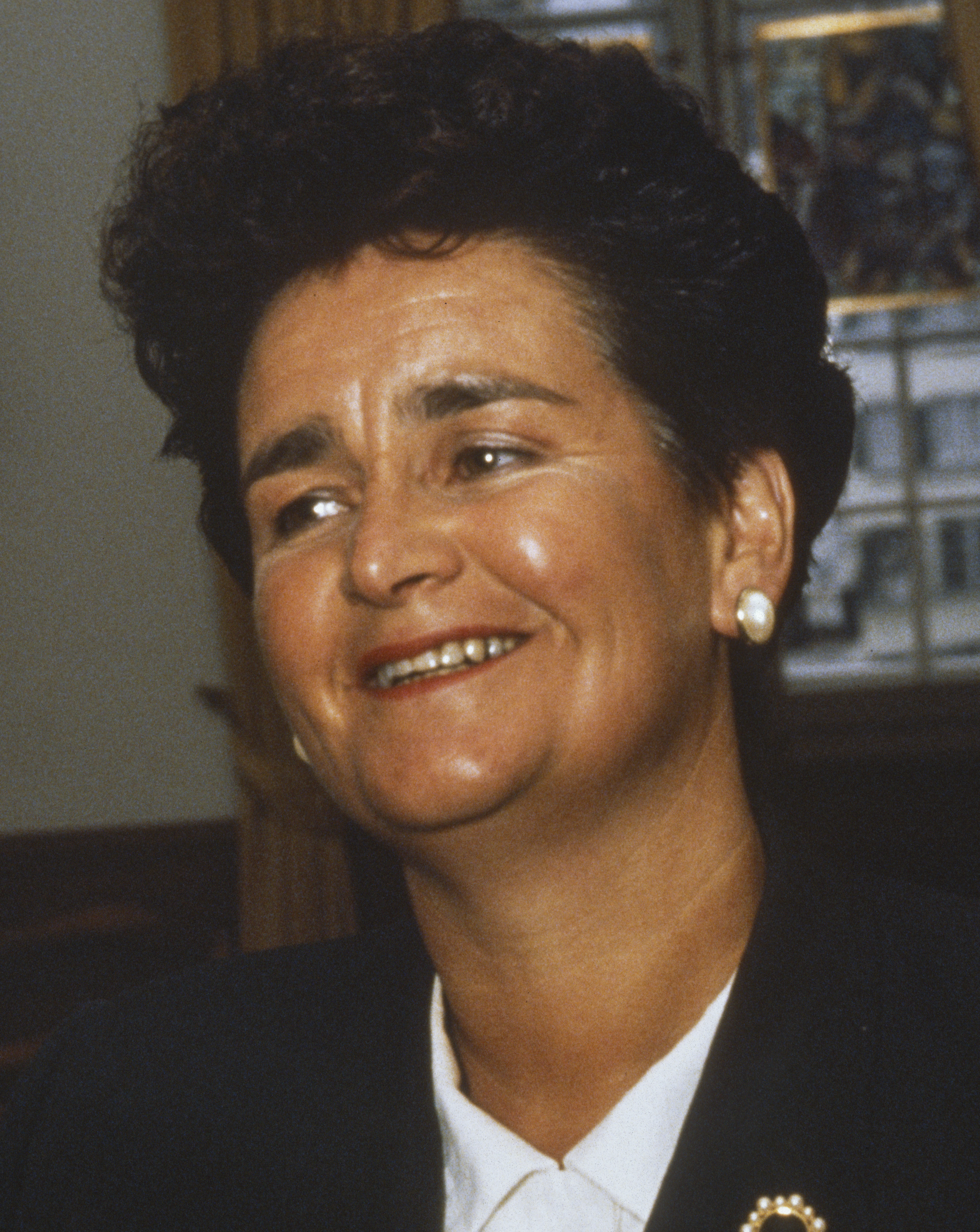
Richardson in 1991

Richardson was a member of a wing of the National Party that emphasised small government and personal liberty. She worked closely with Minister of Social Welfare Jenny Shipley on the 1991 budget, which Richardson proclaimed the 'mother of all budgets'. The budget cut spending on many of the welfare state institutions established in the 1930s by the First Labour Government. The unemployment benefit was cut by $14.00 a week, sickness benefit by $27.04, families benefit by $25.00 to $27.00 and universal payments for family benefits were completely abolished. Richardson also introduced many user pays requirements in hospitals and schools, services previously free to the populace and paid for by the government. Public services such as state housing were devolved essentially into companies under government contract in all but name.

Despite promoting acceptable measures such as personal saving and fiscal prudence, the largest opposition came from the fact that cuts were focused largely on low income families which were greater in dollar terms than savings from the top 20% of families. The budget was not popular with many in the conservative wing of the National Party either, and led to major disagreements over policy. Former Prime Minister Sir Robert Muldoon resigned from his Tamaki constituency in protest of Richardson's policies.

== Outcomes ==
Such was the unpopularity of Richardson's policies among voters that it nearly cost National the next election. At the 1993 election National's comfortable 18 seat majority from 1990 was reduced to a bare majority of only 1. This backlash against the government at the polls, combined with rapidly rising levels of unemployment, was due to the disapproval by the public of Richardson's budget decisions. The effect of her policies has had a profound effect on New Zealand. During her time in the finance portfolio, she implemented a radical shakeup of the healthcare system in New Zealand, which resulted in severe financial strains on hospitals. A 2015 review of the changes in income in New Zealand between 1990 and 1993 concluded that the income of welfare reliant households fell from 72% of the average national income to 58% in just three years.

Anger about the budget played a significant role in the process of electoral reform in New Zealand. Revolted by the spectacle of three elections in a row where the winning parties broke their promises and implemented unpopular market reforms, the electorate voted to change the electoral system from first-past-the-post to mixed member proportional (MMP) in 1993. MMP increased the difficulty for the major parties to command an absolute majority, thus lessening their power to implement radical changes in government policy. In the general elections of 1993 and 1996, several new parties benefited from the electorate's frustration, particularly the Alliance and New Zealand First.

Benefit payments remained at low levels for the following three decades, across successive governments, until a large boost in the 2021 budget by the Sixth Labour Government. The finance minister Grant Robertson referenced the mother of all budgets in his budget speech stating that the benefit increases were to "right the wrongs" of Richardson's 1991 budget and would "address the most inequitable of the changes made 30 years ago". Richardson responded in defence of her budget’s legacy, saying, "Grant Robertson's budget is overtly driven by politics and the desire to pay off Labour supporters", as opposed to her budget, which was "...driven by a desire to lift economic growth and to make employment attractive."
