= 1992 Tamaki by-election =

New Zealand by-election

- 15 February 1992
- Turnout: 17,383 (71.97%)
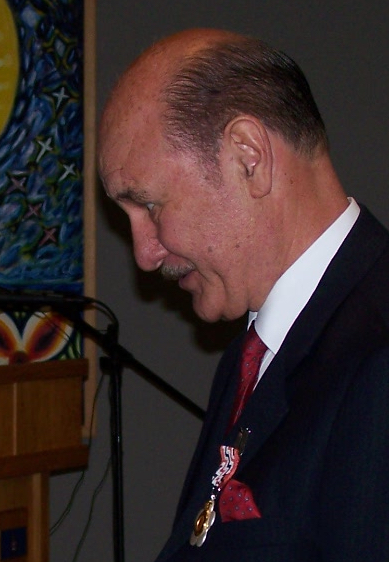

	First party	Second party	Third party
Candidate	Clem Simich	Chris Leitch	Verna Smith
Party	National	Alliance	Labour
Popular vote	7,901	6,649	2,121
Percentage	45.45%	38.25%	12.20%
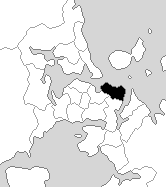
- Tamaki electorate boundaries used for the by-election
Member before election
Sir Robert Muldoon
National
Elected Member
Clem Simich
National

The Tamaki by-election 1992 was a by-election held in the Tāmaki electorate during the 43rd New Zealand Parliament, on 15 February 1992. It was caused by the resignation of incumbent MP Sir Robert Muldoon and was won by Clem Simich with a majority of 1,252. The by-election was also notable as the first contested by the recently formed Alliance Party, and for their success in coming second ahead of the Labour Party.

== Background ==
Sir Robert Muldoon had held the seat of Tamaki since 1960, serving as Prime Minister of New Zealand from 1975 to 1984. Following National's win at the 1990 election Prime Minister Jim Bolger did not appoint Muldoon to a cabinet posting and he quickly became dissatisfied with his backbench role. Following the Mother of all Budgets in 1991, which marked a radical turn to the right in economic policy, Muldoon felt that National had moved too far from its position under his leadership. These factors combined to lead him to resign from parliament and quit politics altogether. Muldoon announced his resignation on 17 November 1991 during his Sunday Radio Pacific talkback programme stating "The Government's on a suicide course and I can't do any more," to listeners.

== Candidates ==
Alliance

The newly formed Alliance, a coalition of several minor parties, sought to carry on its momentum after winning two by-elections for the Auckland Regional Council. The Democrat Party, Green Party, Mana Motuhake and NewLabour Party cooperated and stood joint candidates which saw them secure victories.

Four candidates from three of the component parties sought the Alliance nomination.

- Neville Aitchison, a consultant and activist from the Democrat Party
- Richard Green, the Green Party candidate from the 1990 election
- Laila Harré, a former ministerial advisor from the NewLabour Party
- Chris Leitch, President of the Democrat Party who stood in Whangarei in 1984 and 1987

Leitch was selected after winning an electoral college of members in the Tamaki electorate.

Labour

There were four candidates for the Labour Party nomination.

- Peter Kaiser, deputy principal of Ranui School and West Auckland representative on Labour's New Zealand Council
- Deborah Shuttleworth, a property developer and committee member for the Mount Albert electorate
- Verna Smith, an executive for the Royal New Zealand Foundation of the Blind and a party organiser
- Shane Te Pou, an organiser for the Service Workers' Union and South Auckland representative on Labour's New Zealand Council

Smith was selected. She had joined Labour in 1987 having previously been an organiser for the British Labour Party.

National

David Kirk, a former All Blacks captain and Rhodes Scholar who had just returned from Oxford, launched a high-profile bid for the seat. He had the support of the National Party head office and endorsement from Bolger. The other main candidate was National's Tamaki electorate chairman Clem Simich, a former policeman, who was backed by Muldoon. Janie Pearce, the former deputy leader of the New Zealand Party who had just joined National in 1991, also launched a campaign for the seat.

The 19 nominees were narrowed to a shortlist of five candidates which went to a selection meeting ballot. The candidates were:

- Maureen Eardley-Wilmot, National's candidate for Auckland Central in 1984
- Ron Greer, a former Auckland City Councillor for the Eastern Bays Ward
- David Kirk, a management consultant and ex-All Blacks captain
- Jennie Langley, a former member of National's dominion council
- Clem Simich, deputy chairman of the Auckland National Party and candidate for Mangere in 1977

Simich won the selection, gaining a majority on the third ballot among the 84 local delegates. Kirk was runner-up and Langley was third. Eardley-Wilmot and Greer had been eliminated already. Simich had a far better connection to the electorate than Kirk which led to his victory.

Others

The Christian Heritage Party selected Printing, Packaging and Manufacturing Union organiser Clive Thomson to contest the seat. The New Zealand Defence Movement, an anti-immigration party, selected Auckland lawyer Bevan Skelton as its candidate. Former Rugby League player Dean Lonergan stood as an independent candidate as part of a publicity stunt for Radio Hauraki. Cliff Emeny (former leader of the Country Party) stood as an independent candidate. Tania Harris, who had organised a large protest march against trade union strike action the previous year, stood under the banner of her newly-formed United New Zealand party (unrelated to the United New Zealand formed three years later).

== Polling ==
Five polls were conducted.

Poll	Date (Note: These are the survey dates of the poll, or if the survey dates are not stated, the date the poll was released.)	Chris Leitch	Clem Simich	Verna Smith	Clive Thomson
ONE News-Heylen	28 December 1991	27	52	17	-
ONE News-Heylen	28 January 1992	27.7	31.2	8.5	-
ONE News-Heylen	31 January 1992	39	44	13	-
TV3-Gallup	5–9 February 1992	48.4	36.5	9.1	2.7
ONE News-Heylen	10 February 1992	46	38	13	-

== Previous election ==
1990 general election: Tamaki
Party	Candidate	Votes	%	±%
National	Robert Muldoon	12,191	58.93	+6.90
Labour	Malcolm Johnston	4,599	22.23	
Green	Richard Green	2,633	12.73	
NewLabour	Bill Logue	789	3.81	
McGillicuddy Serious	Craig Thomas Young	183	0.88	
Democrats	Craig Douglas Thomas	134	0.65	
Social Credit	Charles Thomas Willoughby	67	0.32	
Independent	Matthew Ford Elliot	49	0.23	
Independent	Victor Bryers	44	0.21	
Majority		7,592	36.70	+27.03
Turnout		20,689	85.65	−0.86
Registered electors		24,154		

== Results ==
The following table gives the election results:

1992 Tamaki by-election
Party	Candidate	Votes	%	±%
National	Clem Simich	7,901	45.45	−13.47
Alliance	Chris Leitch	6,649	38.25	+21.06^{1}
Labour	Verna Smith	2,121	12.20	−10.03
Christian Heritage	Clive Thomson	199	1.14	
United New Zealand	Tania Harris	118	0.67	
Independent	Dean Lonergan	105	0.60	
McGillicuddy Serious	Adrian Holroyd	73	0.42	
Defence Movement	Bevan Skelton	57	0.33	
Independent	Cliff Emeny	47	0.27	
Blokes Liberation Front	Frank Barker	46	0.26	
Social Credit	Colin Maloney	34	0.20	
Independent	Andrew Aitkenhead	19	0.11	
Independent	Victor Bryers	7	0.04	−0.17
Communist League	James Robb	7	0.04	
Majority		1,252	7.20	
Turnout		17,383	71.97^{2}	−13.68^{2}
National hold		Swing	-29.49	

^{1} Alliance vote increase over 3,556 combined vote for Green Party, New Labour and Democrats in 1990 election.
^{2} Based on 1990 election figures.

== Aftermath ==
Simich served as MP for Tamaki until 2005 when he became a List MP before retiring from parliament in 2008. The National Party celebrated their win at a local Auckland yacht club. Labour Party deputy leader Helen Clark was a surprise attendee and was seen sipping chardonnay with Simich's campaign manager Ross Armstrong in a back room, rather than at her own Labour headquarters. Both National and Labour were relieved that their then common enemy, the Alliance, had been beaten.
