= User pays =

User pays, or beneficiary pays, is a pricing approach based on the idea that the most efficient allocation (and consumption) of resources occurs when consumers pay the full cost of the goods that they consume. In public finance it stands in opposition to another principle of "ability-to-pay," which states that those who have the means should share more of the burden of public services. The ability-to-pay principle is one of the reasons for the general acceptance of the progressive income tax system.

The basic idea of user pays is that those who use a service should be obligated to pay for it. Those who do not go to a movie are not obligated to pay for someone else to attend. As long as the beneficiary aligns exactly with the user, the user-pays principle works. In public goods, beneficiaries and users sometimes do not align.

The divergence of user and beneficiary occurs when production and consumption have external effects. Drivers who purchase gasoline may believe that they pay for the full cost (user-pays) of using gasoline except for the greenhouse gases produced. Drivers impose costs on the environment and are known to contribute to climate change. The "beneficiaries" must bear costs not paid in the purchase of gasoline. In that case the user-pays principle results in the driver not paying the full or social cost of using fossil fuels, which creates a strong argument for regulation and other forms of public intervention. Increasing taxes on gasoline is one possible response that preserves the user-pays principle by increasing the costs to user. Parking taxes and congestion tolls are other measures.

However, such analysis is often complicated by the lack of knowledge that would inform regulators of the efficient level of gas use and the costs of emissions.
