= 41st New Zealand Parliament =

Term of the Parliament of New Zealand

41st Parliament of New Zealand
←	40th Parliament	42nd Parliament	→
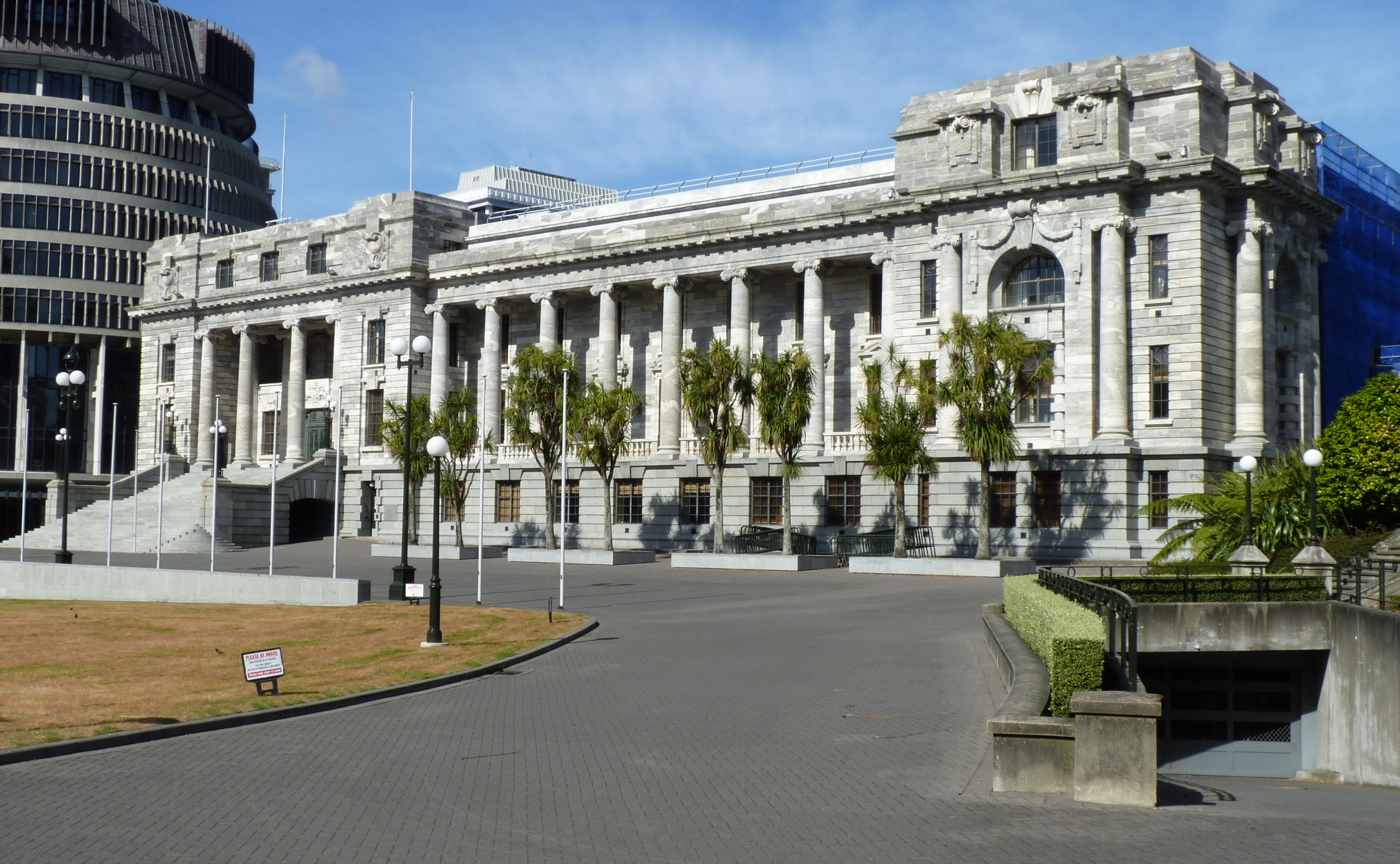
- Parliament House, Wellington

Overview
- Legislative body: New Zealand Parliament
- Term: 15 August 1984 – 29 July 1987
- Election: 1984 New Zealand general election
- Government: Fourth Labour Government

House of Representatives
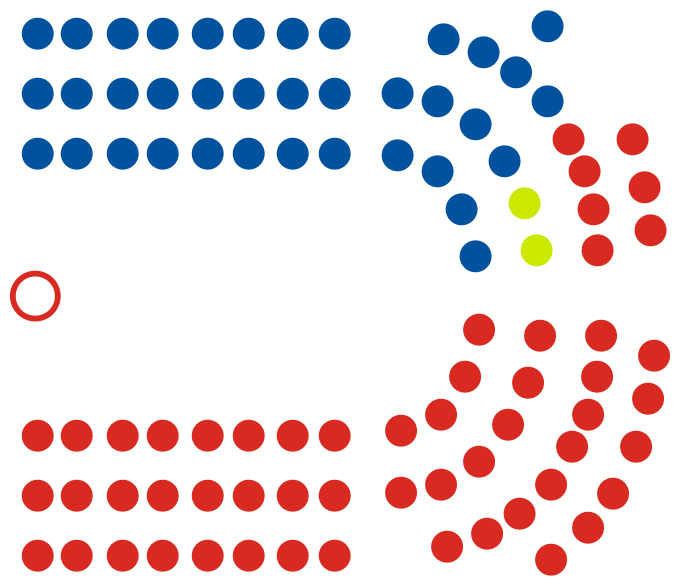
- Members: 95
- Speaker of the House: Gerard Wall from 28 May 1985 — Basil Arthur until 1 May 1985 †
- Leader of the House: Geoffrey Palmer
- Prime Minister: David Lange
- Leader of the Opposition: Jim Bolger — Jim McLay until 26 March 1986 — Robert Muldoon until 29 November 1984

Sovereign
- Monarch: Elizabeth II
- Governor-General: Paul Reeves — David Beattie until 22 November 1985

Sessions
- 1st: 15 August 1984 – 12 December 1985
- 2nd: 26 February 1986 – 29 July 1987

The 41st New Zealand Parliament was a term of the Parliament of New Zealand. Its composition was determined by the 1984 elections, and it sat until the 1987 elections.

The 41st Parliament was the first term of the fourth Labour Party government. It marked the end of three terms of National Party administration under Robert Muldoon. David Lange become Prime Minister and Roger Douglas became Minister of Finance — the economic reforms undertaken by Douglas, nicknamed Rogernomics, would prove to be a defining feature of the fourth Labour government, and were deeply unpopular with Labour's traditional support base. The National Party, now in opposition, experienced a number of leadership disputes, replacing Muldoon first with Jim McLay and then with Jim Bolger.

The 41st Parliament consisted of ninety-five representatives, the highest number since the 10th Parliament (elected in 1887). All of these representatives were chosen by single-member geographical electorates, including four Māori electorates.

== Electoral boundaries for the 41st Parliament ==
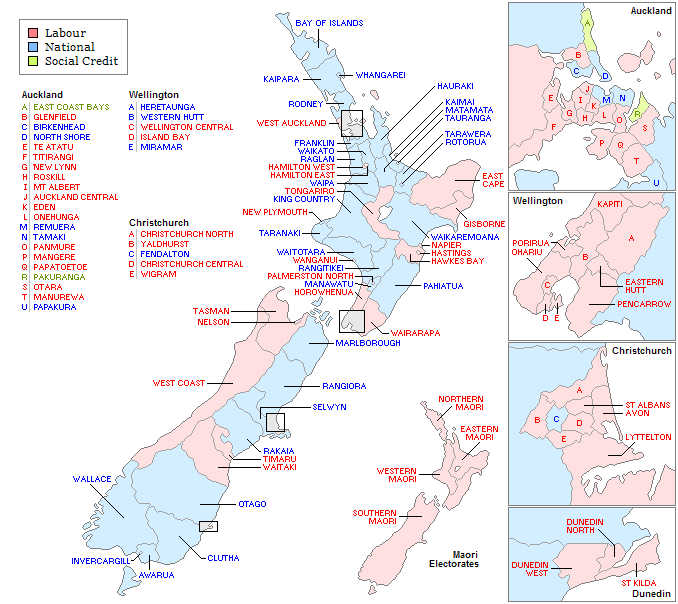

== Overview of seats ==
The table below shows the number of MPs in each party following the 1984 election and at dissolution:

Affiliation	Members	
Affiliation	At 1984 election	At dissolution
Labour	56	55
Government total	56	55
National	37	38
Social Credit	2	2
Opposition total	39	40
Total	95	95
Working Government majority	17	15

Notes

- The Working Government majority is calculated as all Government MPs less all other parties.

== Initial composition of the 41st Parliament ==
The tables below shows the results of the 1984 general election:

Key

National	Labour	NZ Party
Social Credit	Mana Motuhake	Independent

Electorate results for the 1984 New Zealand general election.
Electorate	Incumbent	Winner	Majority	Runner up
General electorates
Ashburton	Rob Talbot		472	Geoff Stone
Auckland Central	Richard Prebble		8,876	Maureen Eardley-Wilmot
Avon	Mary Batchelor		7,771	Andrew Cowie
Awarua	Rex Austin		384	Barry Rait
Bay of Islands	Neill Austin		3,298	Les Hunter
Birkenhead	Jim McLay		1,717	John Course
Christchurch Central	Geoffrey Palmer		8,508	Tony Willy
Christchurch North	New electorate	Mike Moore	5,728	David Dumergue
Clutha	Robin Gray		4,522	M J Sheppard
Dunedin North	Stan Rodger		5,129	Barbara Henderson
Dunedin West	New electorate	Clive Matthewson	6,011	Derek Russell
East Cape	Duncan MacIntyre	Anne Fraser	755	Robyn J. Leeming
East Coast Bays	Gary Knapp		2,020	Murray McCully
Eastern Hutt	Trevor Young		6,005	Joy McLauchlan
Eden	Aussie Malcolm	Richard Northey	2,306	Aussie Malcolm
Fendalton	Philip Burdon		1,457	Murray Dobson
Franklin	New electorate	Bill Birch	5,210	Roy Haywood
Gisborne	Bob Bell	Allan Wallbank	2,168	Bob Bell
Glenfield	New electorate	Judy Keall	809	David Schnauer
Hamilton East	Ian Shearer	Bill Dillon	1,100	Ian Shearer
Hamilton West	Mike Minogue	Trevor Mallard	803	Mike Minogue
Hastings	David Butcher		4,273	Peter Brown
Hauraki	Graeme Lee		3,432	Alisdair Thompson
Hawke's Bay	Richard Harrison	Bill Sutton	974	Richard Harrison
Heretaunga	Bill Jeffries		4,537	Anna MacFarlane
Horowhenua	Geoff Thompson	Annette King	447	Geoff Thompson
Invercargill	Norman Jones		1,279	Dougal Soper
Island Bay	Frank O'Flynn		6,007	John Kananghinis
Kaimai	Bruce Townshend		3,696	Leslie Dickson
Kaipara	Peter Wilkinson	Lockwood Smith	5,564	Bill Campbell
Kapiti	Margaret Shields		4,514	June Oakley
King Country	Jim Bolger		5,617	Jim Simons
Lyttelton	Ann Hercus		4,963	Doug Graham (Note: The candidate Doug Graham who contested the Lyttelton electorate for National is a different person from Doug Graham, who contested and won the Remuera seat.)
Manawatu	Michael Cox		420	Dave Alton
Mangere	David Lange		8,375	Peter Saunders
Manurewa	Roger Douglas		4,933	Stuart Leenstra
Marlborough	Doug Kidd		612	George MacDonald
Matamata	Jack Luxton		5,785	Ross Clow
Miramar	Peter Neilsen		3,499	Don Crosbie
Mt Albert	Helen Clark		6,207	Rod Cavanagh
Napier	Geoff Braybrooke		6,399	M P Liddell
Nelson	Philip Woollaston		3,678	Mel Courtney
New Lynn	Jonathan Hunt		6,340	Ron Hanson
New Plymouth	Tony Friedlander		269	Ida Gaskin
North Shore	George Gair		3,710	Peter Harris
Ohariu	Hugh Templeton	Peter Dunne	1,371	Hugh Templeton (Note: Bob Jones came third for the New Zealand Party in Ohariu)
Onehunga	Fred Gerbic		4,508	Carol Freeman
Otago	Warren Cooper		1,375	David Polson
Otara	New electorate	Colin Moyle	6,519	Taua Michael Tafua
Pahiatua	John Falloon		5,478	Malcolm Brazendale
Pakuranga	Pat Hunt	Neil Morrison	172	Pat Hunt
Palmerston North	Trevor de Cleene		3,033	Colleen Singleton
Panmure	New electorate	Bob Tizard	5,979	Carolyn Tedesco
Papakura	Merv Wellington		1,447	Lynn John
Papatoetoe	Eddie Isbey		2,996	Peter O'Brien
Pencarrow	Fraser Colman		5,418	Barry Cranston
Porirua	Gerry Wall		5,418	Arthur Leonard Gadsby
Raglan	New electorate	Simon Upton	1,976	Linda Holmes
Rangiora	Derek Quigley	Jim Gerard	346	Brian Tomlinson
Rangitikei	Bruce Beetham	Denis Marshall	504	Bruce Beetham
Remuera	Allan Highet	Doug Graham	3,483	Kenneth Sandford
Rodney	New electorate	Don McKinnon	3,876	Brian Dent
Roskill	Phil Goff		4,208	Chris Knowles
Rotorua	Paul East		811	Brian Arps
St Albans	David Caygill		6,172	Ian Wilson
St Kilda	Michael Cullen		5,594	Stewart Clark
Selwyn	Ruth Richardson		3,829	Charles Manning
Sydenham	John Kirk (Note: In July 1983 Kirk said he would not stand in 1984: when Anderton was selected for Sydenham, Kirk (a Lange supporter) withdrew from the Labour caucus and was suspended by Labour, becoming an independent)	Jim Anderton	7,255	Pat Bonisch
Tamaki	Robert Muldoon		3,758	Robin Tulloch
Taranaki	David Thomson	Roger Maxwell	6,013	Graeme Waters
Tarawera	Ian McLean		3,377	Malcolm Moore
Tasman	Bill Rowling	Ken Shirley	1,854	Gerald Hunt
Tauranga	Keith Allen	Winston Peters	4,912	David Parlour
Te Atatu	Michael Bassett		4,991	Frank Diment
Timaru	Basil Arthur		2,219	Maurice McTigue
Tongariro	New electorate	Noel Scott	3,870	Nelson Rangi
Waikaremoana	New electorate	Roger McClay	1,737	John Harré
Waikato	Simon Upton	Rob Storey	1,658	Peter Cleave
Waipa	Marilyn Waring	Katherine O'Regan	5,667	Anthony H. Allen
Wairarapa	Ben Couch	Reg Boorman	394	Ben Couch
Waitakere	Ralph Maxwell		4,474	John McIntosh
Waitaki	Jonathan Elworthy	Jim Sutton	561	Jonathan Elworthy
Waitotara	Venn Young		3,314	Stuart Perry
Wallace	Derek Angus		5,663	Calvin Fisher
Wanganui	Russell Marshall		3,918	Terry Heffernan
Wellington Central	Fran Wilde		4,116	Rosemary Young-Rouse
West Auckland	New electorate	Jack Elder	2,229	Dail Jones
West Coast	Kerry Burke		4,293	John Bateman
Western Hutt	John Terris		4,348	John Tanner
Whangarei	John Banks		2,003	Barbara Magner
Yaldhurst	Mick Connelly	Margaret Austin	2,970	Howard Joseph
Māori electorates
Eastern Maori	Peter Tapsell		11,230	Barry Kiwara
Northern Maori	Bruce Gregory		7,688	Matiu Rata
Southern Maori	Whetu Tirikatene-Sullivan		10,495	Amster Reedy
Western Maori	Koro Wētere		10,110	Bill Katene

Table footnotes:

== By-elections during 41st Parliament ==
There were a number of changes during the term of the 41st Parliament.

Electorate and by-election		Date	Incumbent	Cause	Winner
Timaru	1985	15 June	Sir Basil Arthur	Death	Maurice McTigue

=== Summary of changes during term ===
- Basil Arthur, the long-serving Labour MP for Timaru, died in 1985. The by-election in Timaru was won by Maurice McTigue of the National Party.

== Seating plan ==
=== Start of term ===
The chamber is in a horseshoe-shape.

Luxton	N. Austin	Townshend	East	Burdon	R. Austin	Banks	Lee	D. Marshall	Roger Maxwell	O'Regan	Smith	Storey
Talbot	Friedlander	Cox	McKinnon	Falloon	McLean	Kidd	Gray	Upton	Angus	Gerard	Graham	Keall	Fraser	Wallbank
Young	Gair	McLay	Muldoon	Birch	Bolger	Cooper	Wellington	Jones	Peters	McClay		Morrison	Elder	B. Sutton
											Richardson	Knapp	Dunne	J. Sutton
Arthur
											Neilson	Ralph Maxwell	Dillon	Shirley
Wētere	Prebble	Palmer	LANGE	Moore	Douglas	Caygill	R. Marshall	Butcher	de Cleene	Jeffries		Batchelor	Boorman	Scott
Tizard	Moyle	Wilde	Cullen	Bassett	O'Flynn	Hercus	Rodger	Woollaston	Tirikatene-Sullivan	Young	Wall	Anderton	M. Austin	Northey
Terris	Shields	Colman	Hunt	Burke	Tapsell	Goff	Isbey	Gerbic	Gregory	Braybrooke	Clark	King	Mallard	Matthewson
