= Electoral history of Jim McLay =

List of elections featuring Jim McLay as a candidate

This is a summary of the electoral history of Jim McLay, Leader of the National Party (1984–86), and Member of Parliament for Birkenhead (1975–87).

== Parliamentary elections ==
=== 1975 election ===
General election, 1975: Birkenhead
Party	Candidate	Votes	%	±%
National	Jim McLay	10,871	51.76	
Labour	Norman King	8,055	38.35	−11.46
Values	Ray Tomes	1,253	5.96	
Social Credit	George Thew	907	4.31	−1.17
Independent	Noel John Hardie	14	0.06	
Majority		2,816	13.40	−0.23
Turnout		21,000	84.83	−5.32
Registered electors		24,753		

=== 1978 election ===
General election, 1978: Birkenhead
Party	Candidate	Votes	%	±%
National	Jim McLay	9,350	48.62	−3.14
Labour	Rex Stanton	6,816	35.44	
Social Credit	Des Long	2,583	13.43	
Values	Keith Wargeant	480	2.49	
Majority		2,534	13.17	
Turnout		19,229	71.53	−13.30
Registered electors		26,882		

=== 1981 election ===
General election, 1981: Birkenhead
Party	Candidate	Votes	%	±%
National	Jim McLay	9,672	46.51	−2.11
Labour	Bill Smith	7,568	36.39	
Social Credit	Mervyn Adair	3,552	17.08	
Majority		2,104	10.11	−3.06
Turnout		20,792	90.07	+18.54
Registered electors		23,082		

=== 1984 election ===
General election, 1984: Birkenhead
Party	Candidate	Votes	%	±%
National	Jim McLay	9,547	43.82	−2.69
Labour	John Course	7,830	35.94	
NZ Party	Janie Pearce	3,761	17.26	
Social Credit	Bruce Raymond Sheppard	648	2.97	
Majority		1,717	7.88	−2.23
Turnout		21,786	93.22	+3.15
Registered electors		23,370		

== Leadership elections ==
=== 1984 deputy leadership election ===
Name	Votes	Percentage
Jim McLay	25	53.19%
Jim Bolger	15	31.91%
Bill Birch	7	14.89%

=== 1984 leadership election ===
Name	Votes	Percentage
Jim McLay	22	62.85%
Jim Bolger	8	22.85%
Robert Muldoon	5	14.28%

=== 1986 leadership election ===
Name	Votes	Percentage
Jim Bolger	25	65.78%
Jim McLay	13	34.22%
