= Maurice McTigue =

New Zealand politician

The Honourable Maurice McTigue

16th High Commissioner to Canada
- In office 22 April 1994 – 23 July 1997
- Prime Minister: Jim Bolger
- Preceded by: Judith Trotter
- Succeeded by: Jim Gerard

46th Minister of Immigration
- In office 27 March 1993 – 21 December 1993
- Prime Minister: Jim Bolger
- Preceded by: Bill Birch
- Succeeded by: Roger Maxwell

31st Minister of Labour
- In office 27 March 1993 – 21 December 1993
- Prime Minister: Jim Bolger
- Preceded by: Bill Birch
- Succeeded by: Doug Kidd

11th Minister of Employment
- In office 2 November 1990 – 1 July 1993
- Prime Minister: Jim Bolger
- Preceded by: Annette King
- Succeeded by: Denis Marshall

Member of the New Zealand Parliament for Timaru
- In office 15 June 1985 – 6 November 1993
- Preceded by: Sir Basil Arthur
- Succeeded by: Jim Sutton

Personal details
- Born: 1940 (age 85–86) Methven, New Zealand
- Party: National
- Spouse: Barbara
- Profession: Farmer

Maurice Patrick McTigue QSO (born 1940) is a former New Zealand politician of the National Party. He was a Cabinet Minister in the Fourth National Government from 1990 to 1993, holding the Employment portfolio, among others. He represented the Timaru electorate in Parliament from 1985, when he won the by-election after the death of Sir Basil Arthur, having stood against him in the 1984 general election. He lost the seat to Jim Sutton in the 1993 general election.

From 1994 to 1997, he was the High Commissioner to Canada. McTigue joined the Mercatus Center at George Mason University in 1997 as a distinguished visiting scholar. McTigue was J.M. Bemis Chair in Accountability Studies and Vice President of the Mercatus Center.

== Early life and career ==
McTigue was born in 1940 in Methven. He worked as a farmer in Temuka. He was also president of the New Zealand Jaycees in 1979, attending Jaycee conferences in Asia and Europe.

== Member of Parliament ==
New Zealand Parliament
Years	Term	Electorate	Party
1985–1987	41st	Timaru	National
1987–1990	42nd	Timaru	National
1990–1993	43rd	Timaru	National

At the snap 1984 general election McTigue stood in the Timaru electorate, but was beaten by the incumbent MP Sir Basil Arthur. When Arthur died in 1985 McTigue won the 1985 Timaru by-election. He lost the seat to Labour's Jim Sutton at the 1993 general election. Soon after McTigue entered the New Zealand Parliament in 1985 he was appointed as National's spokesperson for irrigation by party leader Jim McLay. From 1987 to 1990 he served as the National Party's junior whip before becoming spokesperson for transport and works in a February 1990 reshuffle.

=== Minister of Employment & Associate Minister of Finance ===
In 1990, McTigue was appointed Minister of Employment and Associate Minister of Finance, holding primary financial responsibility for student loans, school funding, public transit, occupational licensing, and the restructuring of employment programs.

=== Other minister positions & Chairmanship of Expenditure Control Committee ===
In 1991, McTigue accepted the positions of Minister of State Owned Enterprises, Minister of Railways, and Minister of Works and Development, and assumed Chairmanship of the Cabinet's powerful Expenditure Control Committee.

=== Minister of Labour and Minister of Immigration ===
In 1993, McTigue was appointed Minister of Labour and Minister of Immigration.

== High Commissioner to Canada ==
In April 1994, he moved to Ottawa after being appointed High Commissioner to Canada. Concurrently, he served as non-resident High Commissioner to Jamaica, Barbados, Trinidad and Tobago, and Guyana. An amateur magician, whilst in Canada he co-founded the Ottawa Magicians Guild. As a political appointee with no previous international diplomatic experience of any note, McTigue experienced some difficulty with his management of the High Commission as its Head of Mission, arising from his unfamiliarity with the role.

Despite that, in the 1998 Queen's Birthday Honours, McTigue was appointed a Companion of the Queen's Service Order for public services.

== Mercatus Center ==
McTigue was Vice President for Outreach at the Mercatus Center at George Mason University. In 2003, he was appointed to the Office of Personnel Management Senior Review Committee, formed to make recommendations for new Human Resources systems at the then newly created Department of Homeland Security. He was a special advisor to Louisiana’s Commission on Streamlining Government and served on the Virginia Commission on Government Reform and Restructuring.

== Noters ==
New Zealand Parliament
Preceded by Basil Arthur	Member of Parliament for Timaru; 1985–1993	Succeeded by Jim Sutton
Political offices
Preceded by Annette King	Minister of Employment; 1990–1993	Succeeded by Denis Marshall
Preceded by Bill Birch	Minister of Labour; 1993	Succeeded by Doug Kidd
Preceded by Bill Birch	Minister of Immigration; 1993	Succeeded by Roger Maxwell
Diplomatic posts
Preceded by Judith Trotter	High Commissioner to Canada; 1994–1997	Succeeded by Jim Gerard
