= Roger Maxwell =

Roger Maxwell may refer to:

- Roger Maxwell (politician)
- Roger Maxwell (actor)
