= Rod Vaughan =

New Zealand journalist and television reporter (1947–2024)

- Born: Rodney Francis Vaughan; 24 June 1947; Jersey, Channel Islands
- Died: 25 August 2024 (aged 77); Christchurch, New Zealand
- Occupations: Journalist; reporter
- Notable work: Holmes; Assignment; Frontline; Town and Around; Nationwide

Rodney Francis Vaughan (24 June 1947 – 25 August 2024) was a New Zealand journalist and television reporter, best known for his work in investigative journalism on shows such as Holmes, Frontline, and Assignment. He was a fixture of New Zealand current affairs television for over four decades.

== Early life ==
Vaughan was born on Jersey in the Channel Islands on 24 June 1947, and grew up in post-war Britain. He later lived in a village in southeast England with an aunt who was housekeeper to actor and composer Ivor Novello. As a teenager, Vaughan was a member of the Air Training Corps, achieving the rank of sergeant and piloting gliders and light aircraft.

In 1964, Vaughan's family emigrated to Auckland, New Zealand. He studied journalism at Wellington Polytechnic and worked for newspapers including The New Zealand Herald, The Dominion, and the Western Morning News in Portsmouth, England.

== Television career ==
Returning to New Zealand in 1968, Vaughan began working for the New Zealand Broadcasting Corporation (NZBC), initially in the newsroom. He soon transitioned to the magazine-style show Town and Around as a reporter. After completing an internal television production course, his first producer role was a half-hour documentary on poet Sam Hunt. He later produced for the documentary series Survey, and in 1972 helped create the current affairs show Nationwide, replacing the long-running Gallery. Vaughan assembled a team that included Ian Fraser, Keith Aberdein, Guy Salmon, David Beatson, and John Clarke. The show quickly gained notoriety due to Fraser's controversial interview with the Shah of Iran and content that angered Norman Kirk's government.

Vaughan became a naturalised New Zealand citizen in 1977. In 1978, he shifted focus to investigative journalism. Over the next 37 years, he became known for hard-hitting reporting on shows such as Holmes, Frontline, and Assignment.

=== Notable investigations ===
Vaughan's work spanned national and international stories. Noteworthy pieces included:

- An exposé on over 500 abuse claims from residents in Department of Social Welfare care (1960s–1980s)
- An award-winning report on corruption in the New Zealand fishing industry
- A feature on the booming Irish economy for Assignment
- A 17-year campaign to gain access to Mururoa Atoll, site of French nuclear testing, which he finally filmed in 1991.

Vaughan covered major global events, including the 1994 post-apartheid elections in South Africa and filed a report near the Pakistan–Afghanistan border in the aftermath of the September 11 attacks.

Vaughan was known for persistence. After the collapse of Goldcorp in the late 1980s, he tracked its chairman, Ray Smith, to an American resort. In the mid-1990s, he interviewed Sitiveni Rabuka prior to his third military coup in Fiji.

=== Assault by Bob Jones ===
A defining moment in Vaughan's career occurred on 9 July 1985, when he attempted to interview Bob Jones about disbanding the New Zealand Party. Vaughan chartered a helicopter to find Jones fishing near the Tongariro River. As cameras rolled, Jones punched cameraman Peter Mayo and then struck Vaughan in the face, breaking his nose. Vaughan, his face bloodied, completed his report in a single take. He later required plastic surgery.

The incident is remembered as a landmark in New Zealand broadcast history. Jones later appeared in a humorous video made for Vaughan's 50th birthday.

== Later career and writing ==
In 2003, after 35 years at TVNZ, Vaughan's role was axed amid a broader reshuffling to appeal to younger viewers. He alleged in his 2012 memoir that senior journalists were being pushed out to compete with TV3 in Auckland ratings.

Vaughan then joined TV3, reporting for 60 Minutes for eight years. In 2012, he published his autobiography, Bloodied But Not Beaten: The Stories Behind 40 Years of Investigative Journalism (David Ling Publishing). The book was praised by the Otago Daily Times as "an excellent compilation of the noteworthy investigative assignments" Vaughan had delivered.

After leaving TV3, Vaughan contributed articles to the National Business Review, The New Zealand Herald, and The Listener. In 2018, he again made headlines after landing a two-seater plane safely when the windscreen blew out mid-flight.

== Death ==
Vaughan died from cancer in Christchurch on 25 August 2024, aged 77.
