= 1987 New Zealand general election =

General election in New Zealand

- 15 August 1987

All 97 seats in the House of Representatives 49 seats needed for a majority
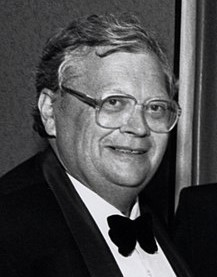

	First party	Second party	Third party
Leader	David Lange	Jim Bolger	Neil Morrison
Party	Labour	National	Democrats
Leader since	3 February 1983	26 March 1986	23 August 1986
Leader's seat	Mangere	King Country	Pakuranga (lost seat)
Last election	56 seats, 42.98%	37 seats, 35.89%	2 seats, 7.63%
Seats before	55	38	2
Seats won	57	40	0
Seat change	▲1	▲3	▼2
Popular vote	878,448	806,305	105,091
Percentage	47.96%	44.02%	5.74%
Swing	▲4.98%	▲8.13%	▼1.89%
- Results by electorate, shaded by winning margin
Prime Minister before election
David Lange
Labour
Subsequent Prime Minister
David Lange
Labour

The 1987 New Zealand general election was a nationwide vote to determine the shape of the 42nd sitting of the New Zealand Parliament. The governing New Zealand Labour Party, led by Prime Minister David Lange, was re-elected for a second term, although the Opposition National Party made gains. The election also saw the elimination of the Democratic Party (formerly the Social Credit Party) from Parliament, leaving Labour and National as the only parties represented.

1987 marked the first time that a Labour Government had been reelected to a second term since 1938, and the first to be reelected overall since 1946. This was in spite of the fact that this was the fourth consecutive election in which Labour won the popular vote by taking a plurality (but not a majority) of the votes.

== Background ==
Before the election, the Labour Party (in government) held 56 seats, giving it an absolute majority in Parliament. The National Party (in opposition) held 37 seats. The Democrats, a small party devoted to the principles of Social Credit, held two seats. The 1985 Timaru by-election, triggered by the death of sitting MP Sir Basil Arthur had resulted in National winning the seat from Labour.

Of particular importance in the election were the economic reforms being undertaken by Roger Douglas, the Minister of Finance. These reforms, sometimes known as "Rogernomics", involved monetarist approaches to controlling inflation, corporatisation of government departments, and the removal of tariffs and subsidies. All these things were strongly opposed by many traditional Labour supporters, who saw them as a betrayal of the party's left-wing principles. Many commentators believed that public anger over Rogernomics could cost the government the election.

Another matter of importance, and perhaps one which enabled Labour to survive public dissatisfaction, was the nuclear issue. In the previous parliamentary term, New Zealand had adopted the New Zealand Nuclear Free Zone, Disarmament, and Arms Control Act, which prevented nuclear weapons or nuclear-powered ships entering New Zealand, a move which provoked an angry reaction from New Zealand's allies in the ANZUS treaty. The National Party intended to revoke the ban, but the New Zealand public were supportive of it. Labour's support for the ban is often considered to be an important factor in the party's re-election.

National was also bitterly divided, with some supporting the Rogernomics reforms, but MPs such as former Prime Minister Robert Muldoon bitterly opposed. Muldoon had undermined his successor as party leader, Jim McLay, who was replaced by his deputy Jim Bolger in 1986. Bolger was more centrist, but National still struggled to be seen as an alternative government. Lange famously mocked Bolger as "an itinerant masseur, massaging the politically erogenous zones." Several groups on the Christian Right (such as the Society for the Protection of Unborn Children (SPUC), Coalition of Concerned Citizens (CCC) and Women for Life) attempted to obtain electoral influence by infiltrating the National Party. They attempted to select socially conservative Christians as candidates to oppose the Labour government's policies towards peace education, sex education, abortion, Māori biculturalism, and the ANZUS alliance. Several CCC supporters contested the election as National candidates, including Rob Wheeler (Mount Albert), Andrew Stanley (Onehunga), and Howard Martin (Papatoetoe). However, the efforts met little electoral success as none were elected.

=== MPs retiring in 1987 ===
Six National MPs and six Labour MPs intended to retire at the end of the 41st Parliament.

Party	Name	Electorate	Date announced
National	Rob Talbot	Ashburton	29 January 1985
National	Rex Austin	Awarua	2 October 1985
National	Neill Austin	Bay of Islands	29 October 1986
National	Jim McLay	Birkenhead	4 August 1986
National	Norman Jones	Invercargill	23 March 1987
National	Jack Luxton	Matamata	5 February 1986
Labour	Mary Batchelor	Avon	19 June 1986
Labour	Frank O'Flynn	Island Bay	13 March 1986
Labour	Ann Hercus	Lyttelton	21 April 1987
Labour	Eddie Isbey	Papatoetoe	17 February 1987
Labour	Fraser Colman	Pencarrow	24 February 1987
Labour	Gerry Wall	Porirua	23 April 1987

== Electoral changes ==
The 1987 electoral redistribution took the continued population growth in the North Island into account, and two additional general electorates were created, bringing the total number of electorates to 97. In the South Island, the shift of population to Christchurch had continued. Overall, three electorates were newly created (Clevedon, Maramarua, and Titirangi), three electorates were recreated (Albany, Coromandel, and Hobson), and four electorates were abolished (Franklin, Hauraki, Rodney, and Waitakere). All of those electorates were in the North Island. Changes in the South Island were restricted to boundary changes.

== Election day ==
The election was held on 15 August, and 2,114,656 people were registered to vote. Turnout was 89.1%, somewhat lower than the 1984 election.

== Results ==
The election saw the Labour Party win 57 seats, enough for it to retain its outright majority. Labour held two more seats than after the previous election. The National Party won 40 seats, an increase of three. It was possible for both parties to increase their number of seats partly due to the disappearance of the Democrats and partly due to the increase in the total number of seats. This is the most recent election where only the two major parties, Labour and National won every seat in the House of Representatives.

Although Labour emerged from the election with a 17-seat lead over National, the difference between each party's vote count was considerably smaller. Labour's share of the vote was 48.0% (up from 43.0% in 1984), while National's was 44.0% (up from 35.5%). While Labour did retain its lead, the gap between Labour and National closed by a larger extent than the seat count would indicate.

The Democrats, despite winning 5.7% of the total vote, did not win any electorates, including the two that they had held before the election. The Democrats have not regained parliamentary representation under their own name since losing it in these elections, although they did manage to enter parliament as part of the larger Alliance in 1996.

The New Zealand Party, which had gained 12.2% of the vote in the previous election, performed poorly, gaining less than 0.3% support. During the campaign, party founder Bob Jones endorsed Labour, sending out pamphlets across the country urging those who supported the New Zealand Party in 1984 to vote for the Labour Party whom he saw as likely to enact New Zealand Party policies.

=== Electoral petition ===
The election night result for Wairarapa was for National by 65 votes. The final official count later gave the seat to the incumbent, Reg Boorman of the Labour Party, by a margin of seven votes, but a judicial recount reduced that to only one vote. But on 12 July 1988, following a petition to the Electoral Court, Wyatt Creech of the National Party was declared elected by a margin of 34 votes (9,994 to 9,960). The petition was supported initially by MPs Roger McClay and Winston Peters (who had been involved in challenges in Taupo and Hunua) but not by the party hierarchy, according to Creech's account in a book by Ross Meurant).

== Detailed results ==
=== Party totals ===
Election results
Party	Candidates	Total votes	Percentage	Seats won	Change
Labour	97	878,448	47.96	57	+1
National	97	806,305	44.02	40	+3
Democrats	97	105,091	5.74	0	−2
Mana Motuhake	7	9,789	0.53	0	–
NZ Party	32	5,381	0.29	0	–
McGillicuddy Serious	19	2,990	0.16	0	–
Values	9	1,624	0.08	0	–
Independents	5	11,873	0.64	0	–
Others	68	20,065	1.11	0	–
Total	424	1,831,777		97	+2

=== Votes summary ===
Popular Vote
Labour	47.96%
National	44.02%
Democrats	5.74%
Independents	0.64%
Others	1.64%

Parliament seats
Labour	58.76%
National	41.24%

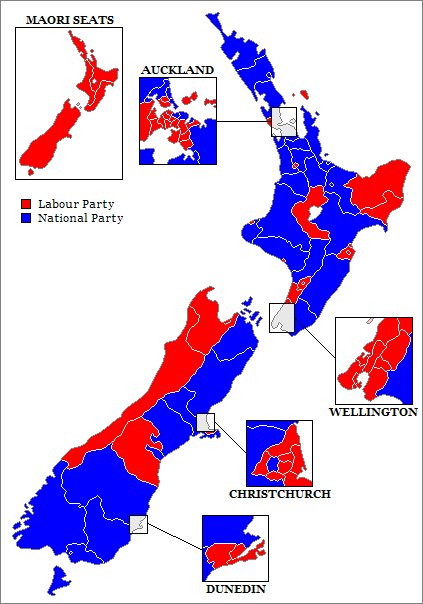

There were 97 seats being contested, two more than were in the previous parliament. All seats were won by one of the two major parties.

The Labour Party, which was in government, won 57 seats, giving it a majority. Most of the seats won by Labour were in the poorest urban and largest inner-city areas, following the party's typical pattern. Labour was particularly strong in the Wellington region, where it won all ten urban seats. It was also strong in the Western and the Southern poorer areas of Auckland, Christchurch and Dunedin, the other three urban centres, as well as in smaller cities such as Hamilton, New Plymouth, Nelson, Napier, Hastings and Palmerston North. Labour also retained its traditional dominance in the Maori seats, winning all four by large margins.

The National Party, also following its traditional patterns, was strongest in rural areas, winning the vast majority of seats in these regions. The party's primary wins in the affluent urban areas of both the Northern and Eastern parts of Auckland, with the party taking six seats. The party also won a number of seats in smaller cities, such as Rotorua, Tauranga, Invercargill and Whangārei. The party performed poorly in the Maori electorates, coming third in all four.

While no minor parties managed to win an electorate, several did manage to gain second place, outperforming one of the major parties but being defeated by the other. The Democrats (formerly Social Credit) was the strongest of the minor parties, coming second in five electorates. Two electorates, East Coast Bays and Pakuranga, were held by the Democrats prior to the election, but were narrowly lost to National candidates. In the other electorates (Coromandel, Rangitikei and Wanganui) the Democrats were the challengers. In the four Maori electorates, the Mana Motuhake party gained second place. Its best result, 31.6%, was obtained in Northern Maori. The New Zealand Party also performed strongly in some electorates, although not as strongly as in the previous election.

Independent candidates did not perform well in the 1987 election, with none of them winning a seat or even placing second.

The tables below shows the results of the 1987 general election:

Key

Labour National Democrats Mana Motuhake

Electorate results for the 1987 New Zealand general election
Electorate	Incumbent	Winner	Majority	Runner up
General electorates
Albany	New electorate	Don McKinnon	1,658	Chris Carter
Ashburton	Rob Talbot	Jenny Shipley	4,935	Ian Maxwell
Auckland Central	Richard Prebble		7,355	Stephen Mayer
Avon	Mary Batchelor	Larry Sutherland	6,322	Wendy Rush
Awarua	Rex Austin	Jeff Grant	2,480	Heather Simpson
Bay of Islands	Neill Austin	John Carter	2,123	Chris Robertson
Birkenhead	Jim McLay	Jenny Kirk	2,220	Barry Gustafson
Christchurch Central	Geoffrey Palmer		6,805	Graham Burnett
Christchurch North	Mike Moore		4,698	Brendan McNeill
Clevedon	New electorate	Warren Kyd	827	Lee Goffin
Clutha	Robin Gray		5,541	Holly Russell
Coromandel	New electorate	Graeme Lee	3,765	Alasdair Thompson
Dunedin North	Stan Rodger		6,534	Sean Davison
Dunedin West	Clive Matthewson		4,547	Ian McMeeking
East Cape	Anne Fraser		246	Wira Gardiner
East Coast Bays	Gary Knapp	Murray McCully	311	Gary Knapp
Eastern Hutt	Trevor Young		4,740	Penn Pattison
Eden	Richard Northey		3,404	Hiwi Tauroa
Fendalton	Philip Burdon		311	Neil Cherry
Gisborne	Allan Wallbank		2,759	Georgina Tattersfield
Glenfield	Judy Keall		1,900	David Schnauer
Hamilton East	Bill Dillon		1,671	Sandra Shearer
Hamilton West	Trevor Mallard		1,235	Doug Simes
Hastings	David Butcher		2,307	Jeff Whittaker
Hawkes Bay	Bill Sutton		859	Michael Laws
Heretaunga	Bill Jeffries		2,554	John Allen
Hobson	New electorate	Ross Meurant	4,998	I J Melville
Horowhenua	Annette King		1,550	Geoff Thompson
Invercargill	Norman Jones	Rob Munro	552	David Soper
Island Bay	Frank O'Flynn	Elizabeth Tennet	7,313	Sandra Clarke
Kaimai	Bruce Townshend	Robert Anderson	2,307	Henry Uttinger
Kaipara	Lockwood Smith		5,797	Irene Hutchings
Kapiti	Margaret Shields		2,760	Roger Sowry
King Country	Jim Bolger		5,954	Leo Menefy
Lyttelton	Ann Hercus	Peter Simpson	3,733	Philip Hall
Manawatu	Michael Cox	David Robinson	131	Michael Cox (Note: Cox was first on election night for Manawatu, but lost when special votes were included)
Mangere	David Lange		6,019	Ron Jeffery
Manurewa	Roger Douglas		3,052	George Cunningham
Maramarua	New electorate	Bill Birch	5,729	Brian Dent
Marlborough	Doug Kidd		2,402	Barbara Hutchison
Matamata	Jack Luxton	John Luxton	6,926	D W McGregor
Miramar	Peter Neilsen		4,061	Ian Macfarlane
Mount Albert	Helen Clark		5,337	Rob Wheeler
Napier	Geoff Braybrooke		5,425	Ashley Church
Nelson	Philip Woollaston		5,467	Bob Straight
New Lynn	Jonathan Hunt		4,369	Dick Berry
New Plymouth	Tony Friedlander	Harry Duynhoven	337	Tony Friedlander
North Shore	George Gair		920	Graeme Ransom
Ohariu	Peter Dunne		4,492	David Lloyd
Onehunga	Fred Gerbic		3,329	Andrew Stanley
Otago	Warren Cooper		1,961	Calvin Fisher
Otara	Colin Moyle		2,409	Trevor Rogers
Pahiatua	John Falloon		2,083	Margo Martindale
Pakuranga	Neil Morrison	Maurice Williamson	2,018	Neil Morrison
Palmerston North	Trevor de Cleene		3,237	Paul Curry
Panmure	Bob Tizard		4,247	T J C Elliott
Papakura	Merv Wellington		2,894	Geoff Summers
Papatoetoe	Eddie Isbey	Ross Robertson	2,689	Howard Martin
Pencarrow	Fraser Colman	Sonja Davies	1,851	Andrew Harvey
Porirua	Gerry Wall	Graham Kelly	3,531	Arthur Leonard Gadsby
Raglan	Simon Upton		3,271	Olivia Scarletti-Longley
Rangiora	Jim Gerard		2,132	Chris Constable
Rangitikei	Denis Marshall		4,039	Bruce Beetham
Remuera	Doug Graham		406	Judith Tizard
Roskill	Phil Goff		2,437	Bob Foulkes
Rotorua	Paul East		2,425	Rosemary Michie
St Albans	David Caygill		4,521	Andrew Cowie
St Kilda	Michael Cullen		5,692	Lyndon Weggery
Selwyn	Ruth Richardson		2,962	Bill Woods
Sydenham	Jim Anderton (Note: Jim Anderton defected to New Labour in 1989.)		6,436	Judith Harrington
Tamaki	Robert Muldoon		1,947	Carl Harding
Taranaki	Roger Maxwell		6,313	Patrick Jackson
Tarawera	Ian McLean		3,577	Malcolm Moore
Tasman	Ken Shirley		1,012	Gerald Hunt
Tauranga	Winston Peters		2,451	Jenny Seddon
Te Atatu	Michael Bassett		2,249	Brian Neeson
Timaru	Maurice McTigue		857	Gary Clarke
Titirangi	New electorate	Ralph Maxwell	3,954	John McIntosh
Tongariro	Noel Scott		2,370	Ian Peters
Waikaremoana	Roger McClay		3,810	T K Stewart
Waikato	Rob Storey		4,155	Bruce Raitt
Waipa	Katherine O'Regan		6,303	L F Holmes
Wairarapa	Reg Boorman	Wyatt Creech (Note: Creech was declared elected by the High Court after an Electoral Petition)	34	Reg Boorman
Waitaki	Jim Sutton		89	Duncan Taylor
Waitotara	Venn Young		5,949	Rachel Stewart
Wallace	Derek Angus		7,594	Barry Julian
Wanganui	Russell Marshall		248	Terry Heffernan
Wellington Central	Fran Wilde		5,191	John Feast
West Auckland	Jack Elder		2,844	Ben Couch
West Coast	Kerry Burke		1,480	Gordon Garwood
Western Hutt	John Terris		3,548	Joy McLauchlan
Whangārei	John Banks		3,687	Edna Tait
Yaldhurst	Margaret Austin		2,542	James Bacon
Māori electorates
Eastern Maori	Peter Tapsell		8,696	Amster Reedy
Northern Maori	Bruce Gregory		3,529	Matiu Rata
Southern Maori	Whetu Tirikatene-Sullivan		8,848	Tikirau Stevens
Western Maori	Koro Wētere		8,129	Eva Rickard

Table footnotes:
