= Barry Gustafson =

New Zealand politician (born 1938)

Barry Gustafson ONZM
- Born: Barry Selwyn Gustafson; 1938 (age 87–88); Auckland, New Zealand
- Education: University of Auckland; Massey University; University of Glasgow
- Known for: Political scientist, historian and biographer
- Political party: Labour (until 1986); National (after 1986)

Barry Selwyn Gustafson ONZM (born 1938) is a New Zealand political scientist and historian, and a leading political biographer. He served for nearly four decades as professor of political studies at the University of Auckland, and as acting director of the New Zealand Asia Institute from 2004 to 2006. He has contested various general elections, first for the Labour Party and later for the National Party, coming second each time.

== Early life ==
Gustafson was born in Auckland in 1938. He was educated at Auckland, Massey and Glasgow Universities (BA 1960, MA 1962, PhD 1974). His doctoral thesis, supervised by Robert Chapman, was titled Continuing transformation: the structure, composition, and functioning of the New Zealand Labour Party in the Auckland region, 1949-70.

== Politics and academia ==
He was a member of the Labour Party from 1954 to 1981, and stood in two general elections as a candidate; in 1960 and in 1966. In 1960, he contested the "blue-ribbon" Remuera electorate and lost by 6109 votes to National's Ronald Algie. In 1966, he contested the Taupo electorate and narrowly lost by 258 votes by National's Rona Stevenson. He wrote that National was afraid of losing the seat so poured thousands of dollars into the campaign. A hundred Waikato women canvassed every house in Tokoroa and Putaruru over two days, using the street lists and blue dot system.

In 1968 he joined the staff at Auckland University, and during his long tenure at Auckland he has authored several leading books on the topic of New Zealand politics. He wrote Social Change and Party Reorganisation (1976) and Labour’s Path to Political Independence (1980) while still a Labour Party member, but after completing The First 50 Years: A History of the New Zealand National Party (1986) changed allegiance to National. In 1986 he also published From the Cradle to the Grave: A Biography of Michael Joseph Savage. In 1975 he unsuccessfully sought the Labour Party candidacy for the Onehunga electorate alongside 26 other aspirants following the retirement of Hugh Watt, but lost to Frank Rogers.

In 1987 he stood as a National candidate for the Birkenhead electorate to replace the retiring Jim McLay, but was defeated by the Labour candidate, Jenny Kirk.

During the 1990s Gustafson was given a number of international academic appointments, including visiting researcher at Stanford University and the European Union in 1990, and research at a number of American and British Universities in 1994. In 1997 Gustafson was Fulbright Visiting Professor at Georgetown University. From 1998 to 2002 Gustafson was appointed Head of the Political Studies Department, and he was also Pro Vice-Chancellor (International) of the university from 2001 to 2002. In 2000 he published His Way: A Biography of Robert Muldoon.

Gustafson's teaching interests are predominantly the European Union, civil society, the development of New Zealand's political culture and parties, political leadership and power, and interdisciplinary studies. For 25 years he also taught Soviet and East European Studies.

In 2004 Gustafson retired as Professor of Political Studies, and was appointed acting director of the New Zealand Asia Institute, a position he held until 2006. In this time he helped to establish a New Zealand Studies Centre at Peking University. In 2007 he published Kiwi Keith: A Biography of Keith Holyoake.

Electoral history of Barry Gustafson
List
- General election, 1960: Remuera
  | Party | Candidate | Votes | % | ±% |
  |---|---|---|---|---|
  | National | Ronald Algie | 10,212 | 68.04 | +5.06 |
  | Labour | Barry Gustafson | 4,103 | 27.34 | |
  | Social Credit | Margaret Morley | 692 | 4.61 | |
  | Majority | | 6,109 | 40.70 | +9.81 |
  | Turnout | | 15,007 | 87.41 | −5.11 |
  | Registered electors | | 17,167 | | |
  General election, 1966: Taupo
  | Party | Candidate | Votes | % | ±% |
  |---|---|---|---|---|
  | National | Rona Stevenson | 6,608 | 45.02 | +3.16 |
  | Labour | Barry Gustafson | 6,350 | 43.26 | |
  | Social Credit | J C Dunn | 1,719 | 11.71 | |
  | Majority | | 258 | 1.75 | −0.17 |
  | Turnout | | 14,677 | 87.27 | −2.17 |
  | Registered electors | | 16,817 | | |
  General election, 1987: Birkenhead
  | Party | Candidate | Votes | % | ±% |
  |---|---|---|---|---|
  | Labour | Jenny Kirk | 11,063 | 53.70 | |
  | National | Barry Gustafson | 8,843 | 42.92 | |
  | Democrats | Richard George Midson | 397 | 1.92 | |
  | NZ Party | Eddie Yeoman | 186 | 0.90 | |
  | Libertarian | D I M Fraser | 110 | 0.53 | |
  | Majority | | 2,220 | 10.77 | |
  | Turnout | | 20,599 | 88.29 | −4.93 |
  | Registered electors | | 23,329 | | |

== Committee work ==
Gustafson has also served as Chairman of the Council of the Auckland College of Education (1992–1997), and Associate Dean of Arts (Research 2000). He chaired the Advisory Committee to the School of European Languages and Literatures from 1999 to 2001, and was a member of the Board and Management Committee of the New Zealand Asia Institute, 2001–2002.

== Honours ==
In the 2004 Queen's Birthday Honours, Gustafson was appointed an Officer of the New Zealand Order of Merit, for services to political science and historical research.

== Works ==
- Continuing transformation: the structure, composition, and functioning of the New Zealand Labour Party in the Auckland region, 1949-70 (1973). PhD thesis
- Social Change and Party Reorganisation (1976)
- Gustafson, Barry (1980). Labour's path to political independence: The Origins and Establishment of the New Zealand Labour Party, 1900–19. Auckland, New Zealand: Auckland University Press. ISBN 0-19-647986-X.
- Gustafson, Barry (1986). The First 50 Years : A History of the New Zealand National Party. Auckland: Reed Methuen. ISBN 0-474-00177-6.
- Gustafson, Barry (1986). From the Cradle to the Grave: a biography of Michael Joseph Savage. Auckland: Reed Methuen. ISBN 0-474-00138-5.
- Gustafson, Barry (2000). His Way: A Biography of Robert Muldoon. Auckland: Auckland University Press. ISBN 1-86940-236-7.
- Gustafson, Barry (2007). Kiwi Keith: a biography of Keith Holyoake. Auckland: Auckland University Press. ISBN 978-1-86940-400-0.
- Gustafson, Barry. "Archer, John Kendrick". Dictionary of New Zealand Biography. Ministry for Culture and Heritage.
- Gustafson, Barry. "Hamilton, Adam". Dictionary of New Zealand Biography. Ministry for Culture and Heritage.
- Gustafson, Barry. "Holland, Sidney George". Dictionary of New Zealand Biography. Ministry for Culture and Heritage.
- Gustafson, Barry. "Lange, David Russell". Dictionary of New Zealand Biography. Ministry for Culture and Heritage.
- Gustafson, Barry. "Marshall, John Ross". Dictionary of New Zealand Biography. Ministry for Culture and Heritage.
- Gustafson, Barry. "Massey, William Ferguson". Dictionary of New Zealand Biography. Ministry for Culture and Heritage.
- Gustafson, Barry. "Muldoon, Robert David". Dictionary of New Zealand Biography. Ministry for Culture and Heritage.
- Gustafson, Barry. "Nash, Walter". Dictionary of New Zealand Biography. Ministry for Culture and Heritage.
- Gustafson, Barry. "Parry, William Edward". Dictionary of New Zealand Biography. Ministry for Culture and Heritage.
- Gustafson, Barry. "Payne, John". Dictionary of New Zealand Biography. Ministry for Culture and Heritage.
- Gustafson, Barry. "Rushworth, Harold Montague". Dictionary of New Zealand Biography. Ministry for Culture and Heritage.
- Gustafson, Barry. "Savage, Michael Joseph". Dictionary of New Zealand Biography. Ministry for Culture and Heritage.
