= Titirangi (electorate) =

Titirangi is a former New Zealand parliamentary electorate. It existed from 1987 to 2002, with a break from 1996 to 1999. It was represented by four members of parliament, with three of them from Labour and one from National.

== Population centres ==
The 1987 electoral redistribution took the continued population growth in the North Island into account, and two additional general electorates were created, bringing the total number of electorates to 97. In the South Island, the shift of population to Christchurch had continued. Overall, three electorates were newly created (including Titirangi), three electorates were recreated, and four electorates were abolished. All of those electorates were in the North Island. Changes in the South Island were restricted to boundary changes. These changes came into effect with the 1987 election.

The electorate was in the western suburbs of Auckland, and initially included the population centres of Titirangi and Laingholm. Most of the electorate's area had come from the Waitakere electorate, but some areas came from Te Atatu and New Lynn. Later, the Titirangi electorate moved further east and took in the suburb of New Lynn.

== History ==
Ralph Maxwell of the Labour Party was the electorate's first representative; he had since 1978 represented the Waitakere electorate. In the 1990 election, Maxwell was defeated by National's Marie Hasler, one of a number of losses contributing to the fall of the Fourth Labour Government. In the 1993 election, Labour's Suzanne Sinclair beat the incumbent. The electorate existed until 1996, when it was replaced by the reconstituted Waitakere. Hasler defeated Sinclair in Waitakere in the 1996 election.

For the 1999 election, the Titirangi electorate was recreated from parts of Waitakere and New Lynn. Hasler was defeated by Labour's David Cunliffe. In 2002, the Titirangi electorate was abolished.

=== Members of Parliament ===
Key

Labour National

Election	Winner
1987 election	Ralph Maxwell
1990 election	Marie Hasler
1993 election	Suzanne Sinclair
(Electorate abolished 1996–1999, see Waitakere)
1999 election	David Cunliffe
(Electorate abolished in 2002; see New Lynn)

=== List MPs ===
Election	Winner
1999 election	Marie Hasler

== Election results ==
=== 1999 election ===
1999 general election: Titirangi
Notes:	Blue background denotes the winner of the electorate vote. Pink background denotes a candidate elected from their party list. Yellow background denotes an electorate win by a list member, or other incumbent. A ✓ or ✗ denotes status of any incumbent, win or lose respectively.						
Party	Candidate	Votes	%	±%	Party votes	%	±%
Labour	David Cunliffe	14,932	50.77		13,401	45.15	
National	Marie Hasler	9,132	31.05		7,502	25.27	
Green	Steve Abel	1,576	5.36		1,845	6.21	
Alliance	Evana Belich	1449	4.93		2,394	8.06	
ACT	Barbara Steinijans	745	2.53		2,126	7.16	
NZ First	Dawn Mullins	539	1.83		835	2.81	
Christian Heritage	Grant Peck	511	1.74		643	2.16	
Mauri Pacific	Peta Si'ulepa	226	0.77		38	0.12	
Christian Democrats	Anne Drake	207	0.70		259	0.87	
Republican	Graham Gilfillan	49	0.17		17	0.05	
Natural Law	Kay Elizabeth Morgan	44	0.15		26	0.08	
Legalise Cannabis					282	0.95	
United NZ					123	0.41	
Libertarianz					85	0.28	
Animals First					43	0.14	
McGillicuddy Serious					29	0.09	
NMP					11	0.03	
One NZ					7	0.02	
People's Choice Party					5	0.02	
Mana Māori					3	0.01	
South Island					2	0.01	
Freedom Movement					1	0.01	
Informal votes		473			206		
Total valid votes		29,410			29,677		
Labour win new seat	Majority	5,800	19.72				

=== 1993 election ===
1993 general election: Titirangi
Party	Candidate	Votes	%	±%
Labour	Suzanne Sinclair	6,410	34.06	
National	Marie Hasler	6,070	32.26	−6.07
Alliance	Tony Hartnett	4,464	23.72	+10.46
NZ First	Michael Loza	1,182	6.28	
Christian Heritage	Sandra Beckon	367	1.95	
McGillicuddy Serious	Val Smith	146	0.77	
Natural Law	Alison Thomas	68	0.36	
Workers Rights	Judy Haldane	66	0.35	
Independent	Colin Richard Burgering	42	0.22	
Majority		340	1.80	
Turnout		18,815	84.91	+2.89
Registered electors		22,157		

=== 1990 election ===
1990 general election: Titirangi
Party	Candidate	Votes	%	±%
National	Marie Hasler	7,082	38.33	
Labour	Ralph Maxwell	7,018	37.99	−20.36
Green	Tony Hartnett	2,450	13.26	
NewLabour	Moira Lawler	1,418	7.67	
Democrats	Judith Judd	346	1.87	
McGillicuddy Serious	Stephen Bussey	159	0.86	
Majority		64	0.34	
Turnout		18,473	82.02	−1.63
Registered electors		22,521		

=== 1987 election ===
1987 general election: Titirangi
Party	Candidate	Votes	%	±%
Labour	Ralph Maxwell	10,379	58.35	
National	John McIntosh	6,255	35.16	
Democrats	Colin Burgering	1,152	6.47	
Majority		3,954	22.23	
Turnout		17,786	83.65	
Registered electors		21,261		
