= Jenny Kirk (politician) =

New Zealand politician (1945–2021)

Jenny Kirk MNZM

Member of the New Zealand Parliament for Birkenhead
- In office 15 August 1987 – 27 October 1990
- Preceded by: Jim McLay
- Succeeded by: Ian Revell

Personal details
- Born: Jennifer Norah Kirk; 18 February 1945
- Died: 30 September 2021 (aged 76) Whangārei, New Zealand
- Party: Labour

Jennifer Norah Kirk MNZM (18 February 1945 – 30 September 2021) was a New Zealand politician of the Labour Party.

== Biography ==
Kirk was born in 1945 and was educated at Westlake High School and later the Auckland Business College. She had several jobs in both New Zealand and Australia as a secretary, hotel worker, motel manager and journalist. She was involved in the National Organisation for Women and on several Parent Teacher Associations and school committees.

She married aged 21 and had two sons before the marriage ended via divorce. In October 1986 she remarried to Owen Saunders.

In 1983 she joined the Labour Party and was a delegate on the Glenfield Labour electorate committee from 1983 to 1985 and became the founding chairperson of the Birkenhead-Northcote branch of the Labour Party in 1986. From 1985 to 1986 she was an electorate secretary for Judy Keall the Member of Parliament for Glenfield.

New Zealand Parliament
Years	Term	Electorate	Party
1987–1990	42nd	Birkenhead	Labour

She represented the Birkenhead electorate from the 1987 election; when she defeated the National candidate for the seat, Barry Gustafson, after Jim McLay retired. After being elected she shared a flat in Wellington with Keall. She was the chairperson of Labour's caucus health committee where she was an advocate of continued state involvement in healthcare, particularly to assist poor people. In 1990 she was defeated by the new National candidate, Ian Revell.

She became Chief Executive of the National Foundation for the Deaf from 1990 to 1994. At the 1995 local-body elections she was elected as a member of the North Shore City Council for the Birkenhead ward. Re-elected three years later, she served on the council until 2001. Kirk was instrumental in the construction of the Northern Busway which connects the North Shore to central Auckland after securing funding from Mark Gosche the Minister of Transport.

In 1993, Kirk was awarded the New Zealand Suffrage Centennial Medal. In the 2002 Queen's Birthday and Golden Jubilee Honours, she was appointed a Member of the New Zealand Order of Merit, for services to local-body and community affairs. Kirk died in Whangārei on 30 September 2021.

== Notes ==
New Zealand Parliament
Preceded by Jim McLay	Member of Parliament for Birkenhead; 1987–1990	Succeeded by Ian Revell
