= 1986 New Zealand National Party leadership election =

- 26 March 1986
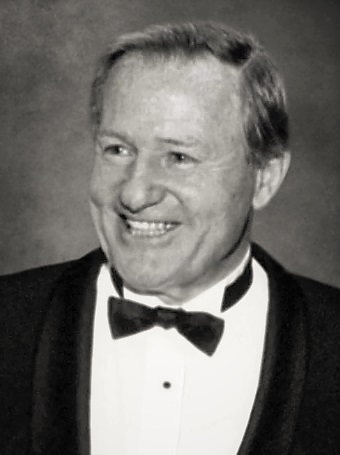

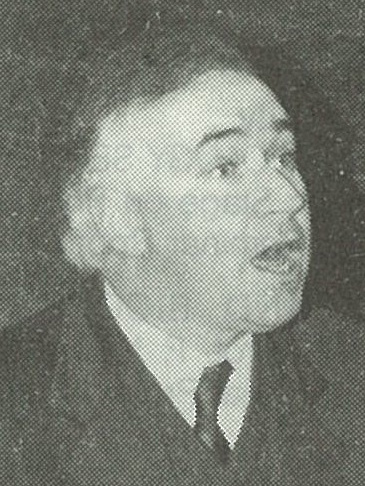
Candidate	Jim Bolger	Jim McLay
Popular vote	25	13
Percentage	65.78%	34.22%
Leader before election
Jim McLay
Leader after election
Jim Bolger

The New Zealand National Party leadership election was an election for the National leadership position in 1986.

== Background ==
The National Party, led by Robert Muldoon, had lost the 14 July 1984 general election to the New Zealand Labour Party in a landslide. In November 1984, Muldoon was challenged for the party leadership by four candidates; Jim McLay and Jim Bolger were the two main challengers and McLay was successful, taking leadership from 29 November 1984.

McLay offered Muldoon the role of Overseas Trade spokesperson, ranked at number ten of the caucus and the same post that Keith Holyoake had held after he had stepped down as National's leader. Barry Gustafson, the biographer of Muldoon and the author of the National Party's history The first 50 years, believes that had Muldoon accepted, National would have avoided the difficulties that it faced in 1985. As it was, McLay struggled to get much traction with the media, while Muldoon was seen as the go-to person, all the while criticising the leadership.

In November 1985, McLay demoted Muldoon to the bottom rank in caucus, and Muldoon-supporter Merv Wellington to the second-lowest rank. Muldoon then openly challenged McLay and called for his removal. When Muldoon was asked whether he was going to be a thorn in National's side, he famously replied: "No, just a little prick." An upcoming leadership challenge before year's end was discussed by the media, and lists of supporters of McLay and his possible successor, Bolger, were printed. The issue came to a head when at the 5 December 1985 caucus meeting, McLay asked three times whether anybody wanted to add anything to the agenda, including the question of leadership. Nobody did, and those caucus members who had stirred the media were reprimanded.

McLay moved his front bench around in February 1986. Some of his supporters (such as Michael Cox and Ruth Richardson) were promoted, whilst George Gair and Bill Birch were demoted. Gair had made it known in December that he would like to become deputy to Bolger if the challenge had been successful, and Birch was an admirer of Muldoon and a close friend of Bolger.

Following their demotion, Gair and Birch contacted most of the 38 caucus members for their support of Bolger, and they obtained the signatures of 25 members under a letter. Together with the chief whip, Don McKinnon, they presented the letter to McLay on Wednesday, 26 March 1986. A caucus meeting was hastily arranged for later that morning. Ruth Richardson cancelled a meeting in Auckland and flew back to Wellington. Simon Upton was in the South Island and although the police got involved, he could not be located.

== Result ==
The following table gives the voting results:

Name	Votes	Percentage
Jim Bolger	25	65.78%
Jim McLay	13	34.22%

== Aftermath ==
Bolger received a clear majority at the caucus meeting, with the support of Muldoon and his supporters. In return, Bolger promoted Muldoon to the front bench, and the former prime minister became National's spokesperson for foreign affairs. Gair was elected deputy leader at the meeting in preference to Ruth Richardson. Gair's majority was stated to have been decisive. Winston Peters was also nominated for deputy, but declined nomination.

Coincidentally National announced a merger with the New Zealand Party the same day which was overshadowed in the media by news of the leadership change.

National lost the 1987 election, but Bolger remained leader and became Prime Minister when the party won in 1990.
