= Workers Party of New Zealand =

Workers Party of New Zealand Hokowhitu o te Kaimahi o Aotearoa
- Leader: Rebecca Broad
- Founded: 2002
- Dissolved: 2013
- Ideology: Socialism; Marxism; Anti-capitalism
- Political position: Far-left
- Colours: Red and white

Website
- workersparty.org.nz

The Workers Party of New Zealand (previously known as the Anti-Capitalist Alliance) was a socialist political party in New Zealand. It published a monthly magazine called "The Spark". In February 2013 the party was transformed from a "mass workers party" to a "fighting propaganda group". The organisation was subsequently renamed Fightback.

Its last national organiser and secretary was Rebecca Broad.

== Platform ==
According to the party's official website,

The Workers Party of New Zealand is a socialist political party active in campaigns nationwide. We aim to build a new political movement based on the interests of workers in New Zealand and internationally. Our activities include organising in workplaces, campaigning against imperialism and fielding candidates in local and general elections.

The five-point policy platform of the Workers Party is as follows:

1. Opposition to all New Zealand and Western intervention in the Third World and all Western military alliances.
2. Secure jobs for all with a living wage and a shorter working week.
3. For the unrestricted right of workers to organise and take industrial action and no limits on workers' freedom of speech and activity.
4. For working class unity and solidarity – equality for women, Maori and other ethnic minorities and people of all sexual orientations and identities; open borders and full rights for migrant workers.
5. For a working people's republic.

The party's magazine The Spark states that the party wants: "A world without poverty and war, a world of material abundance where human potential can be expressed in full," adding that "While these ideas appear untenable today, they were the notions that inspired revolutions in the 20th century."

== History ==
The party was founded in 2002. It was formed by an electoral alliance of the original Workers' Party (pro-Mao, Marxist-Leninist) and the pro-Trotsky Revolution group, with the intention of fielding candidates in the 2002 New Zealand general election. The party was unregistered, and so could not contest the party vote in New Zealand's Mixed Member Proportional electoral system.

In 2004, the original Workers' Party and Revolution merged to become the Revolutionary Workers' League (RWL), which describes itself as a "Marxist current". Subsequently, publications formerly published by the RWL became Workers' Party publications.

== Elections ==
In the 2002 elections, the Anti-Capitalist Alliance stood four candidates, the highest number for an unregistered party that year. The candidates gained a total of 336 votes between them, placing the party in fourth place amongst the unregistered parties which contested.

In the 2005 election the ACA stood eight candidates, again the highest number for an unregistered party. The ACA won a combined total of 582 votes, placing them first amongst the unregistered parties. A nationwide recruitment campaign entitled Let’s Make Workers’ Issues Hi-Viz began in 2006 as an attempt to gain the necessary members to register and contest the party vote in the 2008 general election.

In the 2007 local elections, the Workers Party stood four mayoral candidates in Christchurch, Dunedin, Waitakere City, and Wellington. The Workers Party received 4,705 votes nationwide, with 2,101 of those votes being for Waitakere candidate Rebecca Broad.

In July 2008, the party announced four electorate candidates for the 2008 general election.

On 3 October 2008 the party was registered by the Electoral Commission, allowing it to contest the party vote. In the 2008 New Zealand election, it ultimately received 932 party votes (0.04% of the vote), and 480 electorate votes.

In the leadup to the 2011 election the leadership of the party resigned. The party subsequently failed to apply for broadcasting funding, and its registration was cancelled at its own request on 20 May 2011. The party announced that it would not stand candidates, saying that the previous election "gave quite clear evidence" that trying to using electoral participation to "raise the profile of both socialist ideas and our own organisation" was not working, however on their website they stated that they are backing the Mana Party in the elections.

== Electoral results ==
=== Parliament ===
Election year	# of overall votes	% of overall vote	# of overall seats won	# of electorate seats won	# of list seats won	+/–
2002	336		0 / 121	0 / 69	0 / 52	
2005	582		0 / 121	0 / 69	0 / 52	
2008	932	0.04	0 / 122	0 / 70	0 / 52	

== Notable members ==
In 2003 Paul Hopkinson (who subsequently stood as a candidate for the Anti-Capitalist Alliance in the 2005 election) became the first person charged under the Flags, Emblems, and Names Protection Act of 1981 after burning a New Zealand flag at an anti-war demonstration. In 2008 Hopkinson also became the first school teacher suspended without pay for challenging the provisions of the 1993 Electoral Act relating to public servants, when he refused to voluntarily take unpaid leave in order to contest the seat of Christchurch East in that year's general election as the Workers Party candidate.

Hopkinson is now the leader of the Free Palestine Party and is affiliated with the Popular Front for the Liberation of Palestine.

Another party member, Joel Cosgrove, won the presidency of Victoria University of Wellington Students' Association (VUWSA) in 2008.

The Party expelled Jasmine Freemantle in May 2009 – she had contested the Mana electorate seat on behalf of the Anti-Capitalist Alliance in the 2005 general election, stood for Parliament for the Workers Party as a list candidate in the 2008 general election and succeeded Joel Cosgrove as VUWSA President in 2009.
