= Marie Hasler =

New Zealand politician

Marie Bernadine Hasler (born 1948) is a former New Zealand politician. She was a member of Parliament for the National Party from 1990 to 1993, and then again from 1996 to 2002.

== Early life ==
Hasler was born in Dublin, Ireland. She came to New Zealand while young, and was educated at Auckland University. Before entering politics, she was employed in public relations, and also worked in the civil service.

== Member of Parliament ==
New Zealand Parliament
Years	Term	Electorate	List	Party
1990–1993	43rd	Titirangi		National
1996–1999	45th	Waitakere	27	National
1999–2002	46th	List	24	National

Hasler was first elected to Parliament in the 1990 election as MP for Titirangi, but was defeated in the 1993 election by Labour's Suzanne Sinclair. In 1993, Hasler was awarded the New Zealand Suffrage Centennial Medal. In the 1996 election, she returned to Parliament as MP for Waitakere when she in turn beat Sinclair.

In the 1999 election, however, she was defeated by Labour's David Cunliffe in Titirangi, although she remained in Parliament as a list MP. In the 2002 election, Hasler was only ranked thirty-second on National's party list, and as she did not manage to win back Waitakere, she left Parliament.

=== Political views ===
I believe our most constant and enduring symbol is the Silver Fern. It is the most commonly used and instantly recognisable New Zealand image.

— Marie Hasler, 1999,

In 1998, as Minister of Cultural Affairs, Hasler called for a debate on whether the New Zealand flag should change. Hasler said at the time that for some years she believed New Zealand's existing flag no longer caught the essence of contemporary New Zealand. She also argued that the flag is indistinguishable from the Australian flag, and that it reflects New Zealand's former colonial status. The then-Prime Minister, Jenny Shipley, supported Hasler's view that a new flag for New Zealand could be the Silver fern flag.

== Later years ==
Hasler unsuccessfully stood as a Citizens & Ratepayers candidate on the Waitākere Ward of the Auckland Council in the 2010 Local government elections.

=== Public relations manager ===
Hasler joined the Employers and Manufacturers Association (EMA) after a 12-year political career as Member of Parliament for Waitakere, and Minister of the Crown.

She has been with EMA since 2004, first as a learning contractor, before joining the membership team for a couple of years, followed by her appointment as Public Relations Manager.

Her role includes generating public awareness of EMA's role and activities within the business and wider community and promoting EMA's extensive range of services to members; providing PR support to EMA business units; public speaking engagements; liaison with media, and facilitating opportunities for lawmakers to hear the concerns of EMA members through forums, seminars and business events.

New Zealand Parliament
Preceded by Ralph Maxwell	Member of Parliament for Titirangi; 1990–1993	Succeeded by Suzanne Sinclair
