= Ian Revell =

New Zealand politician (born 1948)

- Ian Revell, c. 1995

Member of the New Zealand Parliament for Birkenhead and Northcote
- In office 1990–1999
- Succeeded by: Ann Hartley

Personal details
- Born: Ian Murray Revell; 7 February 1948 (age 78) Lower Hutt, New Zealand
- Party: National Party

Ian Murray Revell (born 7 February 1948) is a former New Zealand politician. He was an MP from 1990 to 1999, representing the National Party. Before entering politics, Revell was a senior detective in the New Zealand Police.

== Member of Parliament ==
New Zealand Parliament
Years	Term	Electorate	List	Party
1990–1993	43rd	Birkenhead		National
1993–1996	44th	Birkenhead		National
1996–1999	45th	Northcote	36	National

He was first elected to Parliament in the 1990 election as MP for Birkenhead, defeating the incumbent Jenny Kirk of the Labour Party. He remained MP for Birkenhead until the seat was abolished in the 1996 election, when he successfully stood for the new Northcote electorate. In the 1999 election, he was defeated by Labour's Ann Hartley by less than 300 votes. As he was not on National's party list, he left Parliament.

== After politics ==
He now works as a Senior Sales Consultant for Prestige Realty and has been the recipient of the Top Salesperson Award for 2006 and 2007. Revell primarily works on Auckland's North Shore, based in Takapuna.

Revell was formerly the patron of the Monarchist League of New Zealand, but resigned in favour of Sir Peter Tapsell in 2000 soon after leaving Parliament.

At the 2016 Auckland elections, Revell stood for the Takapuna-Devonport local board, as part of Team George Wood. He finished eighth, and was not elected to the board.

New Zealand Parliament
Preceded by Jenny Kirk	Member of Parliament for Birkenhead; 1990–1996	Constituency abolished
New constituency	Member of Parliament for Northcote; 1996–1999	Succeeded by Ann Hartley
