= Suzanne Sinclair =

New Zealand politician

Suzanne Sinclair ONZM JP
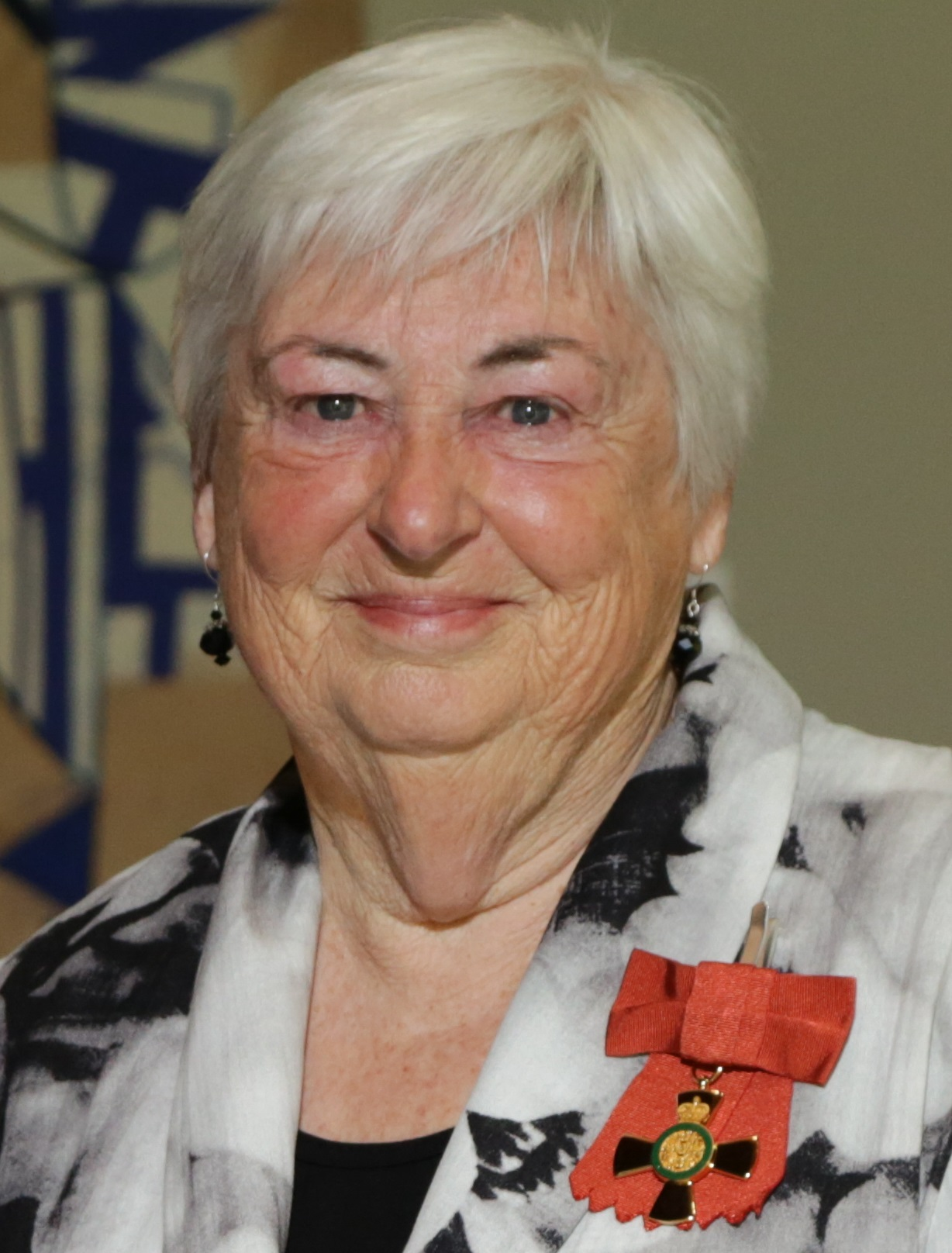
- Sinclair in 2020

Member of the New Zealand Parliament for Titirangi
- In office 6 November 1993 – 12 October 1996
- Preceded by: Marie Hasler
- Succeeded by: Electorate abolished

Member of the Auckland City Council for Avondale Ward
- In office 11 October 1986 – 14 October 1995
- Preceded by: Ward established
- Succeeded by: Phil Raffills

Personal details
- Born: 4 May 1946 (age 80) Auckland, New Zealand
- Party: Labour
- Children: 1
- Occupation: Teacher

Suzanne Mary Sinclair ONZM JP (born 4 May 1946) is a former New Zealand politician of the Labour Party. She was an MP from 1993 to 1996, representing the Titirangi electorate.

== Biography ==
=== Early life and career ===
Sinclair was born in 1946 at Auckland. She was educated at Epsom Girls' Grammar School before attending Auckland Teachers College where she attained a diploma in teaching. Subsequently, she had a career in education as a teacher, literacy tutor, and a tutor for the Hillary Commission. She had one son.

Aside from education, Sinclair worked as an employment officer at the Department of Labour, a co-ordinator of the Friends of the Zoo programme at Auckland Zoo and managed a hire plant nursery business.

=== Political career ===
New Zealand Parliament
Years	Term	Electorate	Party
1993–1996	44th	Titirangi	Labour

Sinclair joined the Labour Party in 1975 and held party positions in the New Lynn electorate and Labour's Auckland Regional Council. She was also a member of Labour's New Zealand Council.

In 1980 Sinclair stood unsuccessfully for the Auckland City Council on a Labour Party ticket. She was later elected to the council after at large was abolished and replaced with a ward system. She was elected in 1986 as a councillor for the Avondale Ward. She was re-elected in 1989 and 1992 before deciding not to stand again in 1995. She was also a member of the Avondale Community Board, the Portage Licensing Trust and the Auckland Institute of Technology Council.

Sinclair was first elected to Parliament in the 1993 election as MP for Titirangi when she beat the incumbent, National's Marie Hasler. The Titirangi electorate was abolished when mixed-member proportional (MMP) voting was introduced for the 1996 election. In the 1996 election, Sinclair unsuccessfully contested the Waitakere electorate, when she was in turn beaten by Hasler. Sinclair was also a list candidate ranked at 27, but Labour did not win sufficient votes for her to remain in Parliament.

=== Career after politics ===
For some years before the Britomart Transport Centre opened in 2003, Sinclair was the head of the Britomart information centre, which was funded by Auckland City Council. She was appointed by the Minister of Transport, Mark Gosche, to the chairmanship of the Road Safety Trust in March 2001, and she stepped down from this role in December 2007. Sinclair is currently relationship manager at the Ministry of Social Development (MSD). She chairs the WALSHtrust, an organisation in West Auckland supporting people with mental health, illness, and disability issues.

== Awards and recognition ==
In the 2020 New Year Honours, she was appointed an Officer of the New Zealand Order of Merit, for services to the community and governance. She is also a Justice of the Peace.

== Notes ==
New Zealand Parliament
Preceded by Marie Hasler	Member of Parliament for Titirangi; 1993–1996	Vacant Constituency abolished, recreated in 1999 Title next held by David Cunliffe
Political offices
New title ward established	Auckland City Councillor for Avondale Ward; 1986–1995	Succeeded by Phil Raffills
