= Birkenhead (New Zealand electorate) =

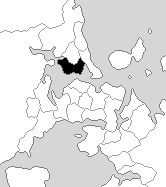
Birkenhead electorate boundaries between 1993 and 1996.

Birkenhead was a New Zealand Parliamentary electorate on Auckland's North Shore from 1969 to 1996, when it was absorbed into the Northcote electorate.

== Population centres ==
Through an amendment in the Electoral Act in 1965, the number of electorates in the South Island was fixed at 25, an increase of one since the 1962 electoral redistribution. It was accepted that through the more rapid population growth in the North Island, the number of its electorates would continue to increase, and to keep proportionality, three new electorates were allowed for in the 1967 electoral redistribution for the next election. In the North Island, five electorates were newly created (including Birkenhead) and one electorate was reconstituted while three electorates were abolished. In the South Island, three electorates were newly created and one electorate was reconstituted while three electorates were abolished. The overall effect of the required changes was highly disruptive to existing electorates, with all but three electorates having their boundaries altered. These changes came into effect with the 1969 election.

This suburban electorate was on the North Shore of Auckland. Most of its original area had previously been with the Waitemata electorate. It was absorbed into the Northcote electorate.

== History ==
Norman King of the Labour Party had first been elected to the Waitemata electorate in the 1954 election. He was the first representatives for the Birkenhead electorate when it was created for the 1969 election. King was defeated in the 1975 election by Jim McLay of the National Party.

The electorate was abolished in the 1996 election, the first mixed-member proportional (MMP) election.

=== Members of Parliament ===
Key

Labour National

Election	Winner
1969 election	Norman King
1972 election	Norman King
1975 election	Jim McLay
1978 election	Jim McLay
1981 election	Jim McLay
1984 election	Jim McLay
1987 election	Jenny Kirk
1990 election	Ian Revell
1993 election	Ian Revell
(Electorate abolished in 1996; see Northcote)

== Election results ==
=== 1993 election ===
1993 general election: Birkenhead
Party	Candidate	Votes	%	±%
National	Ian Revell	7,866	36.99	−12.16
Labour	Ann Hartley	7,762	36.50	
Alliance	Bob Lack	3,314	15.58	
NZ First	Ruth Norman	1,681	7.90	
Christian Heritage	Tony Brebner	364	1.71	
McGillicuddy Serious	Ben Nicholson	164	0.77	
Natural Law	Angela Wood	68	0.31	
Workers Rights	Caroline Selwood-Hatt	45	0.21	
Majority		104	0.48	−13.21
Turnout		21,264	85.98	−0.54
Registered electors		24,730		

=== 1990 election ===
1990 general election: Birkenhead
Party	Candidate	Votes	%	±%
National	Ian Revell	10,094	49.15	
Labour	Jenny Kirk	7,281	35.45	−18.25
Green	Michael Crowther	1,820	8.86	
NewLabour	Ross Tozer	900	4.38	
Democrats	Richard George Midson	179	0.87	−1.05
McGillicuddy Serious	Katerina Jane Julian	161	0.78	
Independent	Tony Seagar	99	0.48	
Majority		2,813	13.69	
Turnout		20,534	85.44	−2.85
Registered electors		24,033		

=== 1987 election ===
1987 general election: Birkenhead
Party	Candidate	Votes	%	±%
Labour	Jenny Kirk	11,063	53.70	
National	Barry Gustafson	8,843	42.92	
Democrats	Richard George Midson	397	1.92	
NZ Party	Ernest Yeoman	186	0.90	
Libertarian	D I M Fraser	110	0.53	
Majority		2,220	10.77	
Turnout		20,599	88.29	−4.93
Registered electors		23,329		

=== 1984 election ===
1984 general election: Birkenhead
Party	Candidate	Votes	%	±%
National	Jim McLay	9,547	43.82	−2.69
Labour	John Course	7,830	35.94	
NZ Party	Janie Pearce	3,761	17.26	
Social Credit	Bruce Raymond Sheppard	648	2.97	
Majority		1,717	7.88	−2.23
Turnout		21,786	93.22	+3.15
Registered electors		23,370		

=== 1981 election ===
1981 general election: Birkenhead
Party	Candidate	Votes	%	±%
National	Jim McLay	9,672	46.51	−2.11
Labour	Bill Smith	7,568	36.39	
Social Credit	Mervyn Adair	3,552	17.08	
Majority		2,104	10.11	−3.06
Turnout		20,792	90.07	+18.54
Registered electors		23,082		

=== 1978 election ===
1978 general election: Birkenhead
Party	Candidate	Votes	%	±%
National	Jim McLay	9,350	48.62	−3.14
Labour	Rex Stanton	6,816	35.44	
Social Credit	Des Long	2,583	13.43	
Values	Keith Wargeant	480	2.49	
Majority		2,534	13.17	
Turnout		19,229	71.53	−13.30
Registered electors		26,882		

=== 1975 election ===
1975 general election: Birkenhead
Party	Candidate	Votes	%	±%
National	Jim McLay	10,871	51.76	
Labour	Norman King	8,055	38.35	−11.46
Values	Ray Tomes	1,253	5.96	
Social Credit	George Thew	907	4.31	−1.17
Independent	Noel Hardie	14	0.06	
Majority		2,816	13.40	−0.23
Turnout		21,000	84.83	−5.32
Registered electors		24,753		

=== 1972 election ===
1972 general election: Birkenhead
Party	Candidate	Votes	%	±%
Labour	Norman King	8,213	49.81	−1.42
National	Don McKinnon	6,680	40.51	−1.67
Social Credit	George Thew	904	5.48	
Values	Andrew John Quaill	642	3.89	
New Democratic	Len Inkster	47	0.28	
Majority		1,533	9.29	+0.24
Turnout		16,486	90.15	+1.33
Registered electors		18,286		

=== 1969 election ===
1969 general election: Birkenhead
Party	Candidate	Votes	%	±%
Labour	Norman King	9,623	51.23	
National	Don McKinnon	7,922	42.18	
Social Credit	John Robert Neil	1,236	6.58	
Majority		1,701	9.05	
Turnout		18,781	88.82	
Registered electors		21,144		
