= 1984 New Zealand National Party leadership election =

- 29 November 1984
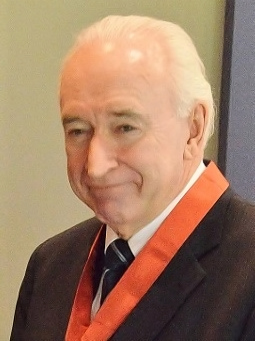

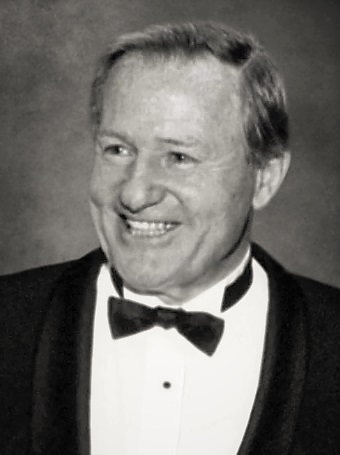

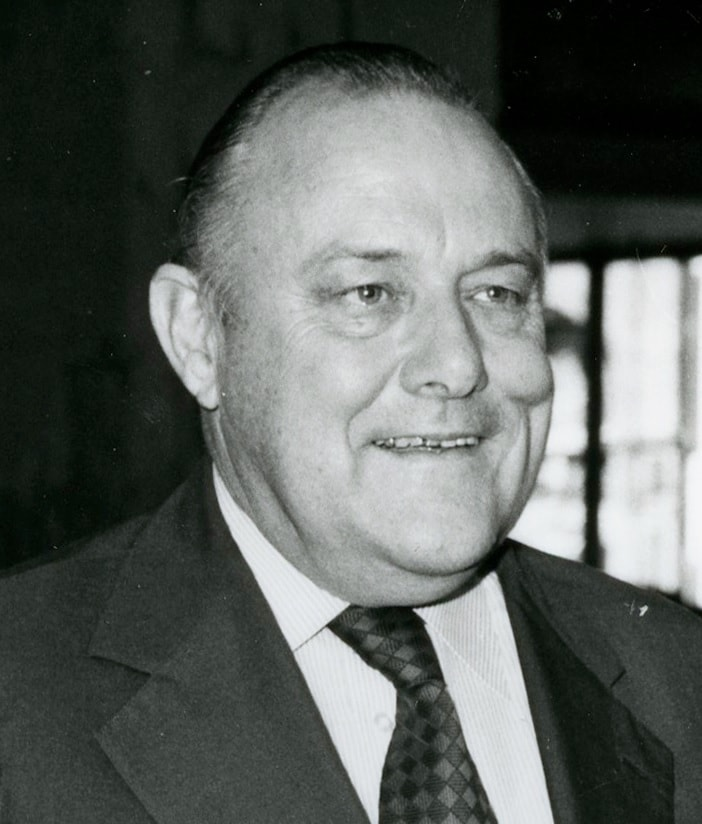
Candidate	Jim McLay	Jim Bolger	Robert Muldoon
Popular vote	22	8	5
Percentage	62.85%	22.85%	14.28%
Leader before election
Robert Muldoon
Leader after election
Jim McLay

The 1984 New Zealand National Party leadership election was held to determine the future leadership of the New Zealand National Party. The election was won by former deputy prime minister Jim McLay.

== Background ==
Muldoon's government was defeated in a landslide in the July 1984 election and there was widespread desire in the party for a leadership change. This desire came mainly from the younger and less conservative wing of the party, which saw Robert Muldoon as representing an era that had already passed.

Muldoon, however, was in no hurry to resign the leadership. In a post-election caucus meeting, he persuaded MPs to defer a vote on the leadership until February 1985 and indicated he would be "unlikely" to stand. Muldoon loyalist Bill Birch commented to media, "The whole thing needs to be considered very carefully, and the leadership decision needs to be dealt with at the appropriate time outside the shadow of a defeat at the election."

Pressure from leadership aspirant George Gair, among others, resulted in the election being brought forward to November 1984 despite Muldoon's objections. With the change of date, Muldoon also confirmed he would recontest his position. Gair, Birch, Jim McLay and Jim Bolger were the other declared candidates, though Gair and Birch dropped out before the election was held (with Birch's support generally transferring to Bolger and Gair's to McLay).

McLay had been Minister of Justice and Attorney-General in the previous administration. He was regarded as socially liberal and free-market friendly, and had been installed as Muldoon's deputy earlier that year in an attempt to balance the leadership. Bolger, the former Minister of Labour, pitched himself as a compromise candidate occupying the middle ground between McLay and Muldoon.

== Candidates ==
=== Jim McLay ===
By 1984 McLay had become a senior member of Muldoon's government. He had served as both Attorney General, Minister of Justice and later as Deputy Prime Minister upon the retirement of Duncan MacIntyre. McLay was a distinct contrast to Muldoon, he promoted free market economic policies and possessed a relatively liberal social outlook. Indeed, he had been elected deputy due to his difference to Muldoon and building on this campaigned on winning back support from urban liberals and youth voters. McLay had flirted with the prospect of the party leadership earlier in the year following Muldoon's refusal to act in accordance with the incoming governments wishes which triggered a constitutional crisis. McLay and several other senior cabinet ministers threatened to appeal to the Governor-General to dismiss Muldoon in favour of McLay unless Muldoon enacted Labour's request to devalue the New Zealand Dollar. Muldoon backed down and thus had remained leader. Since the defeat of the government he had been Deputy Leader of the Opposition, Shadow Minister of Justice and Shadow Attorney-General.

=== Jim Bolger ===
Bolger, Minister of Labour under Muldoon, was seen by most as a more traditionalist and pragmatic candidate whilst being far less conservative than Muldoon. He had traditionalist social views, but was more favourable to liberal economic policy. Bolger had sided with McLay against Muldoon's refusal to act in accordance with the incoming government. Since July he had been Shadow Minister of Labour and Employment.

=== Robert Muldoon ===
After losing the snap 1984 election Muldoon wished to remain as leader, confident that he could defeat Labour in the 1987 election and thus refused to resign as leader. He argued he should stay on at least until Labour's "honeymoon period" was over and made sure to point out that few of National's remaining MPs had experience in opposition. Indeed, McLay had only served in government and Bolger had been an opposition MP for only one term in 1972–75. However, the mood for change within National's ranks became overbearing and forced a vote, though Muldoon still stood for the leadership, although he later admitted that he too felt he would lose.

== Result ==
The election was conducted through a members ballot by National's parliamentary caucus. The following table gives the ballot results:

Name	Votes	Percentage
Jim McLay	22	62.85%
Jim Bolger	8	22.85%
Robert Muldoon	5	14.28%

== Aftermath ==
Bolger was made deputy leader as a sign of party unity. Birch had also sought that role, but was instead ranked third in McLay's January 1985 shadow cabinet and assigned the finance portfolio. Muldoon refused to accept any portfolios McLay offered him and became a backbencher. Muldoon was asked by journalists whether he was going to be a thorn in McLay's side, to which he replied "More like a little prick." He refused McLay's offer of a front bench post, instead opting to return to the backbench for the first time in over two decades. However, he continued to openly agitate against McLay, refusing to withdraw into an "elder statesman" role as McLay wanted. The relationship between the two bottomed out when Muldoon criticised the entire party leadership, forcing McLay to demote him to the lowest rank in the National caucus. McLay wished for Muldoon to become an elder statesman to National (as Keith Holyoake had done years earlier) but Muldoon insisted on having an active role.

McLay would lead National in opposition until 1986, when he was deposed by Bolger.
