= Reg Boorman =

New Zealand politician

Member of the New Zealand Parliament for Wairarapa
- In office 1984–1988
- Preceded by: Ben Couch
- Succeeded by: Wyatt Creech

Personal details
- Born: Reginald George Boorman; 6 February 1935
- Died: 30 October 2016 (aged 81) Whakatāne, New Zealand
- Party: Labour
- Spouse(s): Carol McAlpine; Pauline Moran
- Children: Four sons

Reginald George Boorman (6 February 1935 – 30 October 2016) was a New Zealand politician of the Labour Party.

== Early life and family ==
Boorman served in the Malayan Emergency in 1957 with the New Zealand Army.

His first marriage was to Carol McAlpine. His second marriage (in the 1980s) was to Pauline Moran. He had four sons.

== Member of Parliament ==
New Zealand Parliament
Years	Term	Electorate	Party
1984–1987	41st	Wairarapa	Labour
1987–1988	42nd	Wairarapa	Labour

He unsuccessfully stood for the Labour nomination at the 1980 Onehunga by-election, losing to Fred Gerbic. He was selected to contest the Wairarapa electorate in 1984, where he defeated the National Party incumbent Ben Couch.

Boorman again contested Waiarapa in 1987, defeating new National candidate Wyatt Creech. On election night, Boorman won by a mere 11 votes, but this was reduced to one vote following a full recount. The single vote majority led to Boorman being nicknamed "Landslide" by his Labour Party colleagues and the media, and he used to quip that when he drove over the Rimutaka Hill to Wellington, he would "take his majority with him".

=== Ejection from Parliament ===
Boorman's election was the subject of a legal challenge by Creech. There were two aspects to this challenge. First, Creech claimed that Boorman had violated new laws about election spending by illegally deducting the (then new) goods and services tax from his spending return, effectively reducing his declared spend by 10%. The second part challenged the validity of more than 200 votes on various grounds. Creech was assisted in his efforts by Tauranga MP Winston Peters, who had won an electoral petition in Hunua nine years earlier.

The Electoral Court approved Creech's petition. In 1988, after the recount was carried out, Creech was declared to have won the electorate with a majority of 34 votes (9994 to 9960). The Court also found that Boorman had breached the law by overspending on his election campaign. This outcome resulted in him being declared guilty of a corrupt practice, which meant that Boorman would have been expelled from Parliament even if Creech had not won the recount.

== Post-parliamentary life ==
After Parliament, Boorman worked as a taxi driver. Later, Creech would tell of a time that, as the new MP, he called for a taxi and the driver was Boorman. After his defeat, his second wife Pauline Moran stood unsuccessfully for Labour in the Wairarapa electorate.

In 1990, Boorman was awarded the New Zealand 1990 Commemoration Medal. He died at home in Whakatāne on 30 October 2016, and was survived by Moran.

New Zealand Parliament
Preceded by Ben Couch	Member of Parliament for Wairarapa; 1984–1988	Succeeded by Wyatt Creech
