= Ralph Maxwell (politician) =

New Zealand politician

Ralph Kerr Maxwell MBE JP (20 March 1934 – 25 March 2012) was a New Zealand politician of the Labour Party. After his parliamentary career, he joined New Zealand First.

== Early life and family ==
Maxwell was born in 1934. He married Frances Maxwell in circa 1963 and they had three children.

== Political career ==
New Zealand Parliament
Years	Term	Electorate	Party
1978–1981	39th	Waitakere	Labour
1981–1984	40th	Waitakere	Labour
1984–1987	41st	Waitakere	Labour
1987–1990	42nd	Titirangi	Labour

Maxwell had a high profile as chairman of the Portage Licensing Trust, one of two Licensing Trusts in West Auckland. When Maxwell stood for Parliament in the Waitakere electorate in 1978 for the Labour Party, he was successful. He represented the Waitakere electorate for three parliamentary terms, and when it was abolished for the 1987 election, he successfully stood in the Titirangi electorate instead. In the 1990 election, he was defeated by Marie Hasler, one of a number of losses contributing to the fall of the Fourth Labour Government.

In 1983 he was appointed as Labour's spokesperson for Primary Industries and Horticulture by Labour leader David Lange. Maxwell had a keen interest in agriculture and worked closely with Colin Moyle, who would become Minister of Agriculture in 1984. Maxwell was the Associate Minister of External Relations and Trade and the Associate Minister of Agriculture in 1990.

== After parliament ==
Maxwell moved from West Auckland to Otumoetai after he left parliament. Ahead of the 1993 election he wished to stand for election again, but failed to win the Labour selection for the Titirangi electorate. He responded by leaving the party in 1993 saying Labour was being taken over by "wets" and moving too far away from the previous Labour government's policies. He instead joined New Zealand First and served on the party executive. He then moved to Paerata near Pukekohe where he worked in real estate.

He supported the formation of a National/New Zealand First coalition (over a Labour/New Zealand First coalition) 1996 general election.

In the 1995 New Year Honours, Maxwell was appointed a Member of the Order of the British Empire, for public services. Maxwell died on 25 March 2012 aged 78. He was survived by his wife and their three children.

== Notes ==
New Zealand Parliament
Preceded by Martyn Finlay	Member of Parliament for Waitakere; 1978–1987	Vacant Constituency abolished, recreated in 1993 Title next held by Brian Neeson
New constituency	Member of Parliament for Titirangi; 1987–1990	Succeeded by Marie Hasler
