= 1985 Timaru by-election =

New Zealand by-election

← 1984 general	15 June 1985	1987 general →
- Turnout: 22,027 (89.99%)

Candidate	Maurice McTigue	Jan Walker	Bill Greenslade
Party	National	Labour	NZ Party
Popular vote	9,371	7,879	2,998
Percentage	42.67	35.88	13.65
Member before election
Sir Basil Arthur
Labour
Elected Member
Maurice McTigue
National

The Timaru by-election of 1985 was a by-election for the electorate of Timaru during the term of the 40th New Zealand Parliament. It was triggered by the death of Sir Basil Arthur (who had held the seat since 1962) on 1 May 1985. Sir Basil was Speaker of the House, and had inherited the rank of baronet from his father in 1949.

The by-election was held on 15 June 1985 and was won by Maurice McTigue of the National Party with a majority of 1,492 votes.

== Candidates ==
Labour

Ten candidates were nominated for the Labour Party nomination:

- Doug Low, a trade unionist who was the chairman of the Timaru Trades Council
- Peter Melhopt, a Timaru animal health officer with the Ministry of Agriculture
- David Polson, an Oamaru lawyer who was Labour's 1984 candidate for Otago
- Ian Quigley, a brewery manager and former MP for Otago Central
- Lewis Rivers, a psychologist with the Department of Education
- Ian Simmonds, a Timaru school teacher
- Geoff Stone, a horticulturalist from Hinds who was Labour's 1984 candidate for Ashburton
- Brian Tomlinson, Labour's 1984 candidate for Rangiora
- Jan Walker, a Rotorua City Councillor and lawyer for the Maori Affairs Department
- Bill Woods, Labour's candidate for Selwyn in 1978 and 1981

The selection meeting of around 220 party members was held. The selection committee of Helen Clark MP, Fred Anderson (party former executive), Tony Timms (general secretary), Alan Aldridge (electorate chairman), Roly Anderson (electorate vice-chairman), and Francis Griffin (electorate executive) deliberated for over four hours. They selected Walker as the candidate. She was the daughter of former Timaru City councillor and lawyer, Gordon Walker, and was chairman of the Labour Party's women's council as well as secretary of the Labour's Bay of Plenty Regional Council.

National

At least four men were nominated were nominated for the National Party candidacy. They were:

- James Andrews, of Rangiora
- Maurice McTigue, a Temuka farmer and National's 1984 Timaru candidate
- Peter Miller, a Hamilton insurance company manager
- Peter Paterson, the director of National's Otago-Southland division

McTigue was chosen via a ballot a selection meeting by party members.

New Zealand Party

The New Zealand Party had four candidates vying for selections.

- Dr Bill Greenslade, Timaru surgeon
- McGregor Simpson, a Geraldine food processor
- Graham Ellery, a Geraldine freezing worker
- Denise Ownsworth, a Timaru sales manager

Greenslade was selected by party members at a selection meeting.

Social Credit

Bruce Beetham, the leader of the Social Credit Party who had lost his seat of Rangitikei, was offered to stand in the seat. Beetham did not rule out standing, but inferred it unlikely and would do so only if Social Credit's previous candidate in the seat was unwilling to stand again. Lynley Simmons, a district commissioner of apprenticeships at the Department of Labour, was selected for the by-election. She had been Social Credit's candidate for Timaru in 1981 and 1984.

Others

The Values Party selected Jamie Luck, a schoolteacher, as their candidate. He was a founding member of the party and was its spokesman on international affairs. Alan Falloon, a geologist and former Labour Party member, stood for what he called a new Labour Party whose aim was to "create a type of trade union structure which truly represents the interests of the individual." Previously he had unsuccessfully sought Labour candidacy for Papanui and Christchurch Central. He was a distant relation to John Falloon, a National MP.

== Campaign ==
David Lange recalled a meeting during the by-election campaign when Labour general secretary Tony Timms manhandled a noisy heckler out of the building. He said that the Labour candidate Jan Walker was a good lawyer (and was later a Family Court judge), but that the Labour Party organisation (i.e. head office) insisted on the selection of a candidate who "did not live in Timaru and her opinions, and even her appearance, were at odds with the conservative character of the electorate"; although Jim Anderton predictably (and publicly) blamed the defeat on "the government's abandonment of traditional Labour policy".

New Zealand Party founder Bob Jones (who had already achieved his primary goal of ending the Muldoon government) was disappointed by his party's performance in the by-election came to the decision to put the party into recess.

The by-election was the last time the Social Credit Party name was used before the party renamed itself as the Democratic Party later in the year.

== Polling ==
Two polls were conducted by The Timaru Herald.

Poll	Date (Note: These are the survey dates of the poll, or if the survey dates are not stated, the date the poll was released.)	Maurice McTigue	Jan Walker	Bill Greenslade	Lynley Simmons
The Timaru Herald	30 May 1985	39.8	19.3	10.8	6.3
The Timaru Herald	13 June 1985	31.9	14.8	10.8	6.8

== Results ==
The following table gives the election results:

1985 Timaru by-election
Party	Candidate	Votes	%	±%
National	Maurice McTigue	9,371	42.67	+4.22
Labour	Jan Walker	7,879	35.88	
NZ Party	Bill Greenslade	2,998	13.65	
Social Credit	Lynley Simmons	1,628	7.41	+2.10
Values	Jamie Luck	54	0.25	
Independent Labour	Alan Falloon	31	0.14	
Majority		1,492	6.79	
Informal votes		66	0.29	
Turnout		22,027	89.99	−3.19
Registered electors		24,476		
National gain from Labour		Swing		
