= Templeton v Jones =

Hugh Campbell Templeton v Jones
- Court: Court of Appeal of New Zealand
- Full case name: Templeton v Robert Edward Jones
- Decided: 28 May 1984
- Citation: [1984] 1 NZLR 448
- Transcript: Court of Appeal judgment

Court membership
- Judges sitting: Woodhouse P, Cooke J, McMullin J

Keywords
- negligence

Templeton v Jones [1984] 1 NZLR 448 is a cited case in New Zealand regarding defamation and free speech where the Court ruled against the claims of news broadcasters that it had qualified privilege under "fair information on a matter of public interest" to publish potentially defamatory statements about a Parliamentary candidate's alleged antisemitism. The case was remanded to lower courts to determine if those statements were truthful.
