= Norman King (New Zealand politician) =

New Zealand politician

The Honourable Norman King QSO JP
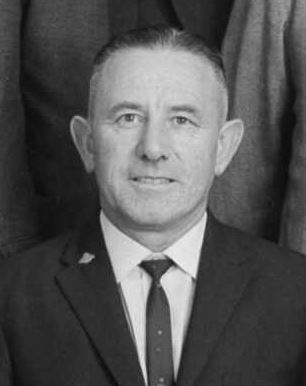

13th Minister for Social Welfare
- In office 8 December 1972 – 12 December 1975
- Prime Minister: Norman Kirk; Bill Rowling
- Preceded by: Lance Adams-Schneider
- Succeeded by: Bert Walker

Member of the New Zealand Parliament for Birkenhead
- In office 29 November 1969 – 29 November 1975
- Preceded by: seat established
- Succeeded by: Jim McLay

Member of the New Zealand Parliament for Waitemata
- In office 13 November 1954 – 29 November 1969
- Preceded by: seat created
- Succeeded by: Frank Gill

Personal details
- Born: 28 December 1914 Auckland, New Zealand
- Died: 8 May 2002 (aged 87) Auckland, New Zealand
- Party: Labour
- Spouse: Marjorie Evelyn Rush (m. 1939; died 1989)
- Children: 1

Norman James King QSO JP (28 December 1914 – 28 May 2002) was a New Zealand politician of the Labour Party, and a cabinet minister.

== Biography ==
=== Early life, family and career ===
King was born in Auckland on 28 December 1914. He had no secondary schooling and lived in a state house. He worked as a storeman in the Minties confectionary factory. He was a trade unionist and became vice president of the New Zealand Federated Storemen and Packers' Union.

On 8 July 1939, he married Marjorie Evelyn Rush, and the couple went on to have one child. During World War II, King served with the Royal New Zealand Air Force in the Pacific.

=== Political career ===
New Zealand Parliament
| Years | Term | Electorate | Party |
|---|---|---|---|
| 1954–1957 | 31st | Waitemata | Labour |
| 1957–1960 | 32nd | Waitemata | Labour |
| 1960–1963 | 33rd | Waitemata | Labour |
| 1963–1966 | 34th | Waitemata | Labour |
| 1966–1969 | 35th | Waitemata | Labour |
| 1969–1972 | 36th | Birkenhead | Labour |
| 1972–1975 | 37th | Birkenhead | Labour |

King was president of the Orakei branch of the Labour Party. In both 1950 and 1953 King stood unsuccessfully on a Labour ticket for the Auckland City Council.

King first stood for Parliament in Hobson in 1951, coming second. He then represented the Waitemata electorate from 1954 to 1969, and the Birkenhead electorate from 1969 to 1975, when he was defeated by Jim McLay.

In 1957 he defeated Robert Muldoon in his second attempt to enter parliament. Zavos says that King:

was a poor speaker, a tiny birdlike man, a storeman and packer before taking up politics ... (but) a shrewd operator, however, whose greatest strength was that he was aware of his limitations. He realised he could not match the expert debating techniques Muldoon had developed.

So King restricted himself to two campaign meetings, and the slight swing to Labour carried King back.

He was described by contemporaries as "gentle and hard working". King was adept at engaging with labourers and factory workers more so than any of his more intellectual colleagues in caucus, who considered him a lightweight, but Warren Freer said he possessed the "common touch".

=== Cabinet Minister ===
King was Minister of Social Welfare (1972–1975), first under Norman Kirk, then under Bill Rowling for the duration of the Third Labour Government. He was noted by cabinet colleagues for his dedication to fulfilling all of Labour's election pledges regarding his portfolio, being said to "work like a beaver". Warren Freer stated "It seemed that no cabinet meeting could be held without another proposal from Norman in his desire to honour every promise involving social welfare and pensioners."

He introduced new measures to help solo parents, pensioners, the disabled and at-risk youth. King introduced the Domestic Purposes Benefit, Christmas bonuses for beneficiaries, wheelchair access to buildings. He was particularly proud of the Children and Young Persons Act which reduced child abuse and juvenile offending by keeping children out of court. King felt almost a personal connection with the people who the payments were intended for as well as the hardships they faced which matched his own experiences earlier in his life.

=== Later life and death ===
King later spent nine years as first lay observer for the Auckland, Hamilton and Taranaki district law societies where he acted as public adjudicator in public complaints against lawyers. He was also patron of the North Harbour of IHC, and a justice of the peace.

In the 1977 New Year Honours, King was appointed a Companion of the Queen's Service Order for public services.

He died on 28 May 2002, having been predeceased by his wife in 1989.

== Notes ==
Political offices
| Preceded by Lance Adams-Schneider | Minister for Social Welfare; 1972–1975 | Succeeded by Bert Walker |
New Zealand Parliament
| New constituency | Member of Parliament for Birkenhead; 1969–1975 | Succeeded by Jim McLay |
| Vacant Constituency abolished in 1946 Title last held by Henry Thorne Morton | Member of Parliament for Waitemata; 1954–1969 | Succeeded by Frank Gill |
