= Ben Couch =

New Zealand politician and rugby union player

The Honourable Ben Couch QSO JP
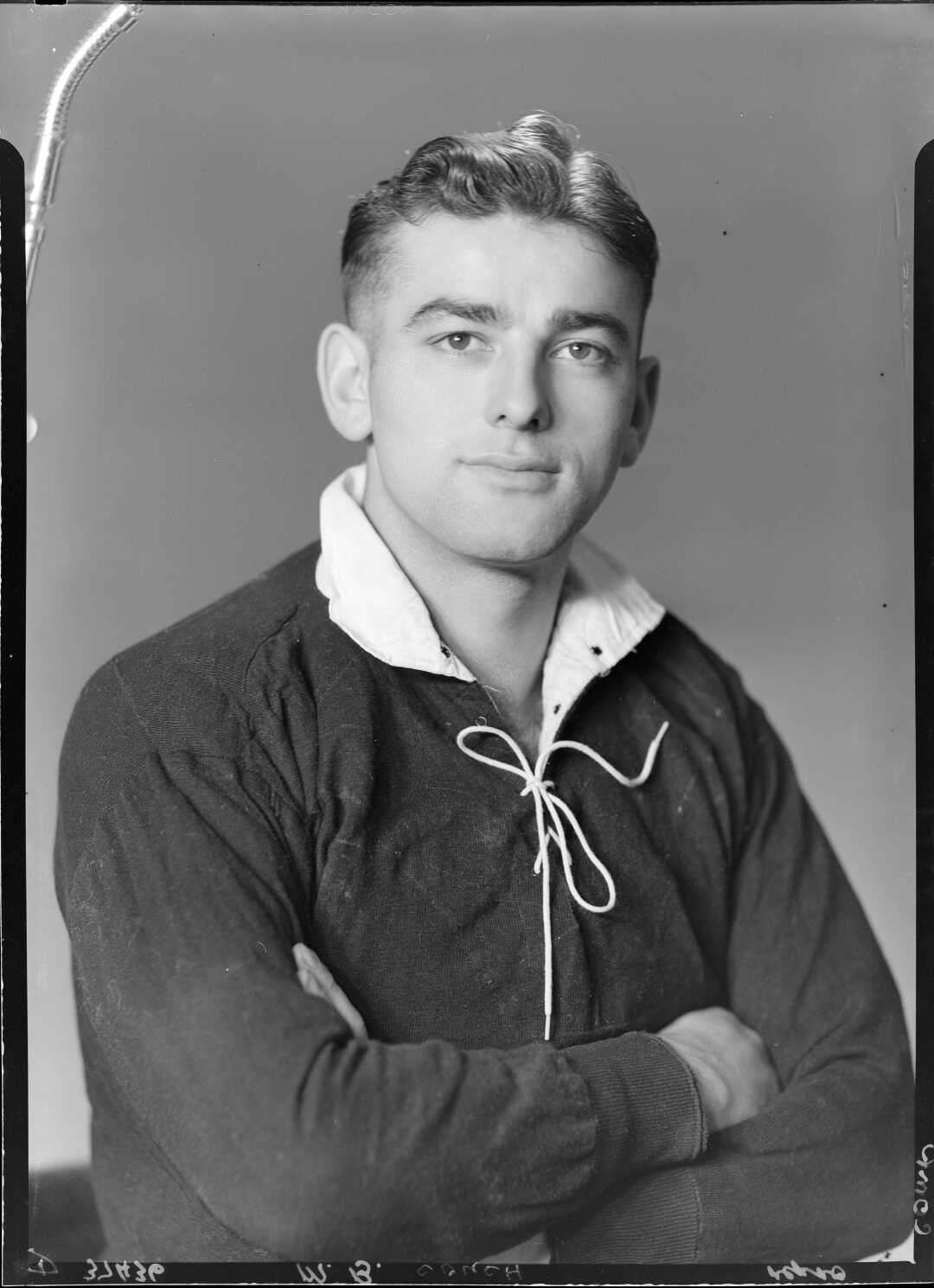
- Ben Couch as an All Black 1947–1949

34th Minister of Māori Affairs
- In office 13 December 1978 – 26 July 1984
- Prime Minister: Robert Muldoon
- Preceded by: Duncan MacIntyre
- Succeeded by: Koro Wētere

Member of the New Zealand Parliament for Wairarapa
- In office 1975–1984
- Preceded by: Jack Williams
- Succeeded by: Reg Boorman

Personal details
- Born: Manuera Benjamin Rīwai Couch; 27 June 1925 Lyttelton, New Zealand
- Died: 3 June 1996 (aged 70) Masterton, New Zealand
- Party: National
- Spouse: Bessie Couch
- Children: 7
- Height: 1.73 m (5 ft 8 in)
- Weight: 81 kg (179 lb)
- School: Christchurch Technical College

Rugby union career
- Position: First five-eighth
Provincial / State sides
Years	Team	Apps	(Points)
1945–54	Wairarapa	55	
International career
Years	Team	Apps	(Points)
1947–49	New Zealand	3	(0)
1948–50	New Zealand Māori	20	

Manuera Benjamin Rīwai Couch QSO JP (27 June 1925 – 3 June 1996) was a New Zealand politician and rugby union player. He was a team-member of the All Blacks and the New Zealand Māori rugby union team in the 1940s.

== Early life ==
Couch was born in 1925 in Lyttelton. He was raised by his maternal grandmother in Christchurch until the age of eight, when he was sent to live with his maternal uncle near Pirinoa in rural Wairarapa. He was educated at Ōtaki Māori College, and then, from 1940 to 1942, Christchurch Technical College. After a carpentry apprenticeship in Christchurch, Couch joined the Royal New Zealand Air Force in August 1943, and later transferred to the army.

In 1945, Couch returned to Pirinoa to work as a builder, and in 1947 he married Bessie Carter, his childhood sweetheart. Carter was a member of the Church of Jesus Christ of Latter-day Saints, and Couch converted to that faith in 1949.

== Rugby union ==
A first five-eighth, Couch represented Wairarapa at a provincial level. He was selected as one of the 5 promising players of the year for the 1945 season in the Rugby Almananac of New Zealand.

Couch was a member of the New Zealand national side, the All Blacks, from 1947 to 1949. He played seven matches for the All Blacks including three internationals. Of Ngāi Tahu and Ngāti Mutunga descent, he also played 20 matches for New Zealand Māori between 1948 and 1950.

== Political career ==
New Zealand Parliament
Years	Term	Electorate	Party
1975–1978	38th	Wairarapa	National
1978–1981	39th	Wairarapa	National
1981–1984	40th	Wairarapa	National

In the 1975 general election, he was elected to Parliament as the National Party member of parliament for the Wairarapa electorate, thus becoming (with Rex Austin) only the second and third Māori (after Sir James Carroll) to win a general electorate (as opposed to a Māori electorate).

He served as Minister of Māori Affairs and Minister of Police in the third National Government, but lost his seat in 1984 to Labour's Reg Boorman. While Minister of Police, he called for the birch to be introduced for violent offenders and allowed the police to use longer batons.

He created some controversy by wearing a Springbok rugby team blazer at the time of their 1981 tour of New Zealand as well as attending a public meeting organised by the League of Rights. This was despite his having been denied entry to South Africa as part of the All Blacks rugby team in the 1940s because of his race.

In June 1981, he was asked "So you support apartheid in South Africa?" to which he responded "Yes. Over there I've got to".

In 1977, Couch was awarded the Queen Elizabeth II Silver Jubilee Medal, and in 1990 he received the New Zealand 1990 Commemoration Medal. In the 1991 Queen's Birthday Honours, Couch was appointed a Companion of the Queen's Service Order for public services.

== Later life and death ==
In the 1990s, Couch was involved in various Māori organisations. He died in 1996 in Masterton.

Political offices
Preceded by Peter Wilkinson	Postmaster-General; 1978–1980	Succeeded by Warren Cooper
Preceded by Frank Gill	Minister of Police; 1980–1984	Succeeded by Ann Hercus
New Zealand Parliament
Preceded by Jack Williams	Member of Parliament for Wairarapa; 1975–1984	Succeeded by Reg Boorman
