= Roger Maxwell (politician) =

New Zealand politician (born 1941)

Roger Francis Hamilton Maxwell QSO (born 21 March 1941) is a former New Zealand politician. He was an MP from 1984 to 1999, representing the National Party.

== Early life ==
Maxwell was born in South Canterbury. He obtained his tertiary education at Lincoln College and at Massey University. From 1967, he owned a farm in the Taranaki region and studied rural valuation.

== Political career ==
New Zealand Parliament
Years	Term	Electorate	List	Party
1984–1987	41st	Taranaki		National
1987–1990	42nd	Taranaki		National
1990–1993	43rd	Taranaki		National
1993–1996	44th	Taranaki		National
1996–1999	45th	List	25	National

Maxwell was a member of the Ashburton branch of the Young Nats from 1963. He chaired the Urenui branch of the National Party from 1969, and was the Taranaki electorate chairman from 1977 to 1983. He organised the Taranaki electorate campaigns for the 1978 and 1981 elections for David Thomson.

He was first elected to Parliament in the 1984 election in Taranaki, when he succeeded Thomson. When the National Party won power in the 1990 election, Maxwell became the Minister of Business Development, the Associate Minister of Employment, and the Associate Minister of Immigration. In 1993, he became the (full) Minister of Immigration.

In the 1996 election, the Taranaki electorate was merged with the King Country electorate, and the combined Taranaki-King Country electorate was taken by King Country MP (and Prime Minister) Jim Bolger; Maxwell instead contested the New Plymouth electorate, but was defeated by Labour's Harry Duynhoven. Maxwell remained in Parliament as a list MP, but lost his ministerial portfolios in the reshuffle made necessary by National's coalition with New Zealand First. He retired at the 1999 election.

== Honours ==
In the 2004 Queen's Birthday Honours, Maxwell was appointed a Companion of the Queen's Service Order for public services.

New Zealand Parliament
Preceded by David Thomson	Member of Parliament for Taranaki; 1984–1996	Constituency abolished
