= Workers' Party of New Zealand (1991) =

- Founder: Ray Nunes
- Founded: 1991
- Dissolved: 2004 (merged with Revolutionary Workers' League and Anti-Capitalist Alliance)
- Preceded by: Communist Party of New Zealand
- Succeeded by: Workers' Party of New Zealand (2006)
- Headquarters: Auckland
- Newspaper: The Spark
- Ideology: Communism; Marxism-Leninism; Maoism; Anti-Revisionism
- Colours: Red

The Workers' Party of New Zealand was a minor political party in New Zealand.

== Formation ==
Following the turn of the Communist Party of New Zealand to Trotskyism, the Workers' Party was the main organisation in New Zealand to uphold the anti-revisionist, Beijing line of Mao Zedong in opposition to the market reforms of Deng Xiaoping.

The party was one of the two founding parties in the Anti-Capitalist Alliance, which was the only communist organisation to field a national slate of candidates in the New Zealand general elections during the 2000s.

== Merger ==
In 2004, the party merged with a South Island-based Trotskyist group, Revolution, to form the Revolutionary Workers' League (RWL). The RWL became a body within the reformed Workers' Party of New Zealand (2006), which was created when the Anti-Capitalist Alliance, a loose electoral alliance, became one of the first unified communist parties in the world formed through an alliance of Marxist-Leninists and Trotskyists.

== Party publications ==
The party published a monthly newspaper called The Spark. They also contributed to Liberation, a magazine produced by the Anti-Capitalist Alliance.

The Spark was adopted as the triweekly magazine of the Revolutionary Workers' League in 2004, before becoming the de facto, monthly organ of the unified Workers' Party in 2006.

== The work of Ray Nunes ==
The party was most notable for its chairman, Ray Nunes, a former representative of the Communist Party of New Zealand Central Committee. A party member for nearly 40 years, Nunes had represented the Communist Party in international meetings for over two decades, in addition to other senior responsibilities, such as serving as Wellington district secretary. Nunes represented the CPNZ at the 1960 International Meeting of Communist and Workers Parties, siding with China in attacking N. S. Khrushchev for his alleged revisionism, and meeting with Mao Zedong and Kang Sheng as part of a party delegations during 1966–1968. He would continue to represent the Workers' Party in its relations with communists abroad until his death.

Nunes wrote many articles about Marxism, many of which were regularly published in The Spark. His major work, From Marx to Mao – and After (1995), is an introductory course in Marxism-Leninism, which also contains Nunes' analysis of the collapse of the Soviet Union and the market reforms of Deng in China. In the year of Nunes' death, the party published his essay The Maori in Prehistory and Today (1999), which is believed to be the first Marxist analysis of the Maori national question.

== See also ==
- Communism
- List of Communist Parties
- Politics of New Zealand
- Workers' Party of New Zealand (2006)
- Communist Party of New Zealand
- Socialist Unity Party of New Zealand
- Socialist Party of Aotearoa

== Official website ==
- Archive at the Internet Archive Wayback Machine
