= Bob Jones (businessman) =

New Zealand businessman and politician (1939–2025)

Sir Robert Jones
- Born: Robert Edward Jones; 24 November 1939; Lower Hutt, New Zealand
- Died: 2 May 2025 (aged 85); Wellington, New Zealand
- Occupation: Property investor; author; politician
- Political party: New Zealand Party (1983‍–‍1985)
- Children: 9
- Relatives: Lloyd Jones (brother); Sam Duckor-Jones (nephew); Bob Brockie (brother-in-law)

Sir Robert Edward Jones (24 November 1939 – 2 May 2025) was a New Zealand property investor, author and politician.

== Early life and education ==
Jones was born in Lower Hutt on 24 November 1939, the son of Edward L. Jones. He was the older brother of author Lloyd Jones.

Growing up in a Lower Hutt state housing suburb, Jones attended Naenae College from 1953 to 1957. He was one of the 200 foundation pupils, and one of the ten who stayed to the sixth form. Most pupils left as soon as they turned 15 to work. Jones always recalled his former history teacher, Guy Bliss.

Jones went on to attend Victoria University of Wellington, where he earned a blue in boxing, won the New Zealand Universities lightweight boxing title in 1957, and contributed to a boxing column in the university's newspaper Salient. He remained a fan of boxing and sometimes commented on TV on big matches.

== Business career ==
Jones earned his wealth investing in commercial property through his company Robt. Jones Holdings Ltd. His net worth was $550 million according to the 2013 NBR rich list, and $600 million a year later.

== Political career ==
In 1977, Jones supported drag queen Carmen's campaign for the Wellington mayoralty.

Jones formed the short-lived libertarian New Zealand Party in 1983, just before Robert Muldoon's snap 1984 election. Jones explicitly stated his disgust that the supposedly pro-free-enterprise National Party had implemented socialist policies like price and wage freezes, and a top tax rate of 66%. His party acted as a spoiler, helping deliver the government to the Labour Party. Jones disbanded his party after the election, since Labour implemented many of his policies in their free market reforms. He and Muldoon had a legal feud when Muldoon unsuccessfully sued Jones for defamation. Jones still respected Muldoon, and chaired the farewell dinner for Muldoon's retirement from Parliament.

In the 1984 election, Jones challenged sitting cabinet minister Hugh Templeton for the Ohariu seat. Templeton distributed a speech to journalists, which included: "Mr Jones despises... bureaucrats, civil servants, politicians, women, Jews and professionals...". Jones successfully sued Templeton for defamation. Templeton conceded that Jones despising Jews was untrue, but argued multiple defences including qualified privilege; all were rejected by the court, which found in Jones' favour. Templeton v Jones became an important precedent in defamation law. In the election, Jones received 28.97% of the electoral vote, and Templeton lost his seat to Labour candidate Peter Dunne, the future United Future leader.

== Public profile ==
In 1985, Jones infamously punched TVNZ reporter Rod Vaughan on camera, when the journalist's helicopter disrupted him fishing in a remote valley in Taupō. Jones was convicted of four charges of assault and fined $1,000; Jones asked the judge if he could pay $2,000 to do it again.

Jones attempted to remove the Fijian Embassy from one of his properties during the time of the 1987 Fijian coup and succeeded two years later.

In 2015, Jones was removed from an Air New Zealand flight for failing to follow crew instructions; Jones' company subsequently bought a jet for Jones and other company executives to use domestically.

In 2018, Jones sued filmmaker Renae Maihi for defamation after she presented a 90,000 signature petition to NZ Parliament calling for his knighthood to be revoked. The petition objected to comments Jones had written for the National Business Review; in one column, Jones suggested that Waitangi Day should be replaced by a Māori Gratitude Day, a suggestion he claimed was satirical. The defamation trial was set for two weeks beginning in February 2020; Jones withdrew the case after five days.

== Personal life and death ==
Jones was known for keeping his family life private. He was married several times and had nine children, including daughters Frances and Amelia, and son Chris. He said he had "never understood monogamy" and described himself as "not a conventional" father.

Jones died after a brief illness in Wellington, on 2 May 2025, at the age of 85.

== Honours and awards ==
Jones was appointed a Knight Bachelor in the 1989 Queen's Birthday Honours, for services to business management and the community. The following year, he received the New Zealand 1990 Commemoration Medal.

== Bibliography ==
=== Novels ===
- The Permit (1984)
- Full Circle (2000)
- Ogg (2002)
- True Facts (2003)
- Degrees for Everyone (2004)
- Four Comic Novellas (2020)

=== Essay collections ===
- Wimp Walloping (1989)
- Prancing Pavonine Charlatans (1990)
- Punch Lines (1991)
- A Year of It (1992)
- Wowser Whacking (1993)
- No Punches Pulled The Best of Bob Jones (2014)

=== Non fiction ===
- New Zealand's Boxing Yearbook (1972 and 1973)
- Jones on Property (1977)
- New Zealand the Way I Want It (1978)
- Travelling (1980)
- Letters (1982)
- '80s Letters (1990)
- Prosperity Denied (1996)
- Memories of Muldoon (1997)
- My Property World (2005)
- Jones on Management (2007)
- Fighting Talk: Boxing and the Modern Lexicon (2013)
