= New Zealand Party =

- Founder: Bob Jones
- Founded: 21 August 1983
- Dissolved: 25 January 1993; 33 years ago
- Merged into: New Zealand Coalition
- Ideology: Classical liberalism Libertarianism
- Slogan: Freedom and Prosperity

The New Zealand Party operated as a political party in New Zealand from 1983 to 1993. Established by millionaire property tycoon Bob Jones, the party promoted economic liberalisation—it was the first political party to promote free market reforms. It failed to win any seats in Parliament, but is believed to have played a major role in causing the defeat of Robert Muldoon's National government in the 1984 election by splitting the vote (as a spoiler).

== History ==
=== Foundation ===
At the time of the New Zealand Party's foundation in 1983, the Prime Minister was Robert Muldoon. Muldoon was a social conservative but also a strong believer in the need for state intervention in the economy, claiming that only with government involvement could New Zealand be prosperous. In accordance with his economic theories, Muldoon introduced the so-called "Think Big" program, which saw massive overseas borrowing to finance large government construction projects. Later, as New Zealand's economy declined and its deficit increased, Muldoon introduced wage and price controls.

Bob Jones, a self-made millionaire and author, strongly opposed these policies, comparing them to what he had recently observed in the Soviet bloc. In a number of newspaper opinion pieces, Jones spoke out against the government, claiming that the National Party had betrayed its principles of individual liberty and free enterprise. For example, Jones advocated a flat tax, while the top rate at the time was 66%. Since Jones had previously been a strong supporter of the National Party and a personal friend of Muldoon, his attacks on the government marked an end to both associations.

Jones attracted considerable attention with his comments. Although he had not originally considered it, a number of people encouraged him to start a new political party. Jones himself believed that a new party could conceivably split the National Party's vote, bringing the government down. Jones appears to have hoped that losing an election would help to purge the National Party of "Muldoonism". Along with some of the people who had contacted him about the matter, Jones began to lay the foundations for a new organization. The party's name and motto were chosen, and its primary policies were set out.

When Muldoon heard of Jones's plans, he initially dismissed them as a hoax, saying that the rumours were a publicity stunt by Jones. The comments galvanized Jones and his supporters into action, and it was decided to officially launch the new party on 21 August. The launch, which coincided with the release of the party's manifesto, was well covered by the media, and the New Zealand Party gained considerable public recognition. Not long after it was founded, some polls showed the party with nearly 20% of the vote.

=== Early days ===
The policies established by the New Zealand Party differed substantially from those of most of the country's other parties. Perhaps its most well-known views related to economic matters, particularly the liberalization of the economy and the adoption of laissez-faire principles. The party also, however, put forward a number of other significant proposals. One example was the party's unorthodox defence policy, which advocated a large reduction in military expenditure and the abandonment of New Zealand's defence links with Australia and the United States (particularly the ANZUS alliance). Jones himself favoured the total abolition of New Zealand's armed forces, but that was considered too radical to be adopted as New Zealand Party policy.

While the New Zealand Party attracted considerable support, it also attracted a considerable amount of criticism. Muldoon labeled the party "greedies", pointing to Jones's personal wealth and to the fact that much of the party's support came from the richer sections of society. The party was also attacked by left-wing groups, which objected to its support of free market economics. Both Muldoon and left-wing groups claimed that the New Zealand Party was out of touch with ordinary New Zealanders. In addition, the party also struggled to shake off the perception that it was "the Bob Jones Party" and not a full-fledged political movement. Jones himself was sometimes criticised for his blunt and "politically incorrect" style, but others found it refreshing.

Other prominent figures within the New Zealand Party included Janie Pearce (the deputy leader), Josephine Grierson (an economic policy specialist), Michael Batchelor (spokesman for defence) and Gordon Dryden. Dryden, whose views often clashed with those of other party members, was highly charismatic, and gained a substantial following within the party. In May 1984, he left the party after a major disagreement with Jones.

=== 1984 election ===
When Muldoon unexpectedly called an early election, the New Zealand Party was caught by surprise and had only a month to prepare its campaign. Opinion polls gave a mixed view of the party's strength. Some gave it up to 20% of the vote, but others gave it only around 2–3%. Perhaps unwisely, the party did not decide to focus on specific seats, but instead spread its efforts equally across the country.

On election day, the New Zealand Party failed to win any seats. New Zealand then used the plurality voting system, which made it hard for third parties to gain representation in Parliament. The party gained second place in several electorates, and gained third place in many more. However, its votes were dispersed, rather than concentrated in any one area, so it was unable to enter Parliament. In total, the New Zealand Party gained 12.2% of the vote, putting it in third place. The Social Credit Party, although winning only 7.6% of the vote, won two seats, probably as the result of having specifically focused its attention on them since the 1950s.

While its failure to win seats was a major disappointment to the New Zealand Party, it took comfort in the fact that it likely caused the defeat of the government. The opposition Labour Party soundly defeated Muldoon and the National Party, and many commentators believe that the New Zealand Party played a major role in drawing voters away from National. Once in power, the Labour Party (prompted by Finance Minister Roger Douglas) actually adopted many of the New Zealand Party's economic policies, much to the resentment of traditional Labour supporters. Douglas even wanted a flat tax, but was stymied by the Labour Prime Minister David Lange. Shortly after the election, the National Party dropped Muldoon as leader and eventually came to embrace free market economics as well.

=== Decline ===
After the election, the New Zealand Party quickly deteriorated as a significant political force. Jones, his primary objective of ending the Muldoon government having been accomplished, and disappointed by the Party's electoral performance in the 1985 Timaru by-election, unilaterally made a decision to put the Party into recess. He later said that with the "Rogernomics" reforms being undertaken by the new administration, he considered his party to be redundant. A few other prominent figures, most notably Party President Malcolm McDonald, also left the party at this stage. Not surprisingly, many in the Party's ranks considered Jones' move to put the party into recess without reference to Party Members to be undemocratic and, despite Jones' opposition, proceeded to hold the scheduled annual conference in July 1985. At that conference, delegates elected John Galvin, a dairy farmer from Matamata, as Party Leader. In 1986, with its policy platform largely implemented by a reforming Labour Government, beset by funding problems and falling support, the New Zealand Party opted to "merge" into the National Party as an attempt to keep its strong free enterprise and libertarian philosophy alive. The merger was overshadowed by a leadership coup in National that occurred the same day.

However, the name "New Zealand Party" continued to be used by some individuals beyond that point as a Rump party. Galvin was replaced as leader with Stephen Greenfield, the Managing Director of a travel company, who led the remaining party members who opposed the merger with National. Greenfield (who stood in North Shore) led the remaining New Zealand Party in the 1987 election which saw a huge drop in support. Jones endorsed Labour at the 1987 election, sending out pamphlets across the country urging those who supported the New Zealand Party in 1984 to vote for the Labour Party. Eventually the remaining members of the party ended up as part of a supposedly centrist party known as the New Zealand Coalition after joining together with fragments of Social Credit and the United NZ Party.

Some commentators see the modern ACT New Zealand party as being the successor of the New Zealand Party, and Bob Jones was counted among ACT's supporters. Not everyone would agree with the link, however, and there are a number of notable differences in policy between the two. For example, ACT's foreign and defence policies are directly contrary to New Zealand Party policy, with ACT advocating increased defence expenditure and the strengthening of traditional alliances. It was not until 2023 that ACT won more votes than the New Zealand Party did in 1984.

== Electoral results ==
Election	candidates	seats won	votes	percentage
1984	95	0	236,385	12.3
1987	32	0	5,381	0.3
1990	4	0	477	nil
