= Allan Wallbank =

New Zealand politician

Member of the New Zealand Parliament for Gisborne
- In office 14 July 1984 – 27 October 1990
- Preceded by: Bob Bell
- Succeeded by: Wayne Kimber

Personal details
- Born: 1937 (age 88–89) Ngāruawāhia, New Zealand
- Party: Labour
- Children: 4
- Profession: Farmer

Allan Robert Wallbank (born 1937) was a New Zealand politician of the Labour Party.

== Biography ==
=== Early life and career ===
Wallbank was born in Ngāruawāhia in 1937. In his youth he was a provincial representative rugby player.

He worked at the Public Trust Office for three years until he entered farming in the King Country. He owned a dairy and pig farm for seven years and later a meat and wool farm for fourteen years. He was a branch chairman and district vice-president of the Young Farmers' Club. For two years he was an aerial topdressing representative. He was a prominent member of Federated Farmers, being a branch chairman, member of the Auckland area executive and national vice-president. By 1984 his farm was 1,400 acres in size and was running a thoroughbred unit. He was a member of the New Zealand Asthma Foundation and president of the Gisborne Asthma Society.

=== Political career ===
New Zealand Parliament
Years	Term	Electorate	Party
1984–1987	41st	Gisborne	Labour
1987–1990	42nd	Gisborne	Labour

He had been both secretary and president of the Gisborne Labour Electorate Committee and was the campaign organiser for Labour MP Trevor Davey at the 1975 election. He was elected to Labour's national executive and a member of the party's policy council. Wallbank contested Gisborne in the 1978 and 1981 unsuccessfully, losing by small margins on each occasion. In 1981 he was first on election night, but lost on a recount.

He represented the electorate of Gisborne in Parliament from 1984 to 1990. He developed Guillain–Barré syndrome which damaged his nerves and was reliant on a wheelchair for his recovery. While still needing a wheelchair he travelled to Wellington to attend a special caucus meeting in 1988 to support Prime Minister David Lange in a leadership challenge by sacked finance minister Roger Douglas. He was defeated by Wayne Kimber; one of a number of losses contributing to the fall of the Fourth Labour Government.

At the 1992 local-body elections he stood as a candidate for Mayor of Gisborne, but was unsuccessful, losing to the incumbent John Clarke.

== Personal life ==
Wallbank is married with four children. His interests are rugby, soccer and polocrosse.

== Notes ==
New Zealand Parliament
Preceded by Bob Bell	Member of Parliament for Gisborne; 1984–1990	Succeeded by Wayne Kimber
