= Bob Bell (politician) =

New Zealand politician

Robert Linfield Bell (23 August 1929 – 16 November 2011) was a New Zealand politician of the National Party. He had a farming background and represented the Gisborne electorate in Parliament from 1975 until his defeat in 1984.

== Early life ==
Bell was born in Blenheim in 1929. His father was Alex Linfield Bell. He received his education at Christchurch Boys' High School, Horowhenua College, and Feilding Agricultural High School. He graduated from Lincoln College in 1951 with a diploma in valuation and farm management. In 1954, he married Anne Wilkinson, the daughter of John Arthur Wilkinson, and they were to have two daughters and one son.

== Professional life and community involvement ==
He was a farm appraiser for six years, followed by seven years as the Gisborne–East Coast representative of London Wood Brokers (NZ) Ltd. For ten years after that, he was a farm management consultant and valuer. Bell was a director of Gisborne Holdings Ltd.

Bell was a counsellor for the Gisborne Budgetary Advisory Service, a committee member of the Poverty Bay A & P Association, and a director of the YMCA in Gisborne. He served in the Territorials for six years, with the rank of lieutenant, and was appointed as a justice of the peace in 1987.

== Political career ==
New Zealand Parliament
Years	Term	Electorate	Party
1975–1978	38th	Gisborne	National
1978–1981	39th	Gisborne	National
1981–1984	40th	Gisborne	National

Bell joined the National Party in 1958, and was chair of the Kaiti branch from 1962 to 1978. He represented the Gisborne electorate in Parliament from 1975 to 1984, when he was defeated by Allan Wallbank. Bell was part of the small group of National MPs that stopped Robert Muldoon driving home drunk on the night that he had called the 1984 snap election.

Bell was awarded the Queen Elizabeth II Silver Jubilee Medal in 1977, and the New Zealand 1990 Commemoration Medal.

== Death ==
Bell died on 16 November 2011 in Tauranga, aged 82.

== Notes ==
New Zealand Parliament
Preceded by Trevor Davey	Member of Parliament for Gisborne; 1975–1984	Succeeded by Allan Wallbank
