= Robert Muldoon =

Prime Minister of New Zealand from 1975 to 1984

The Right Honourable Sir Robert Muldoon GCMG CH
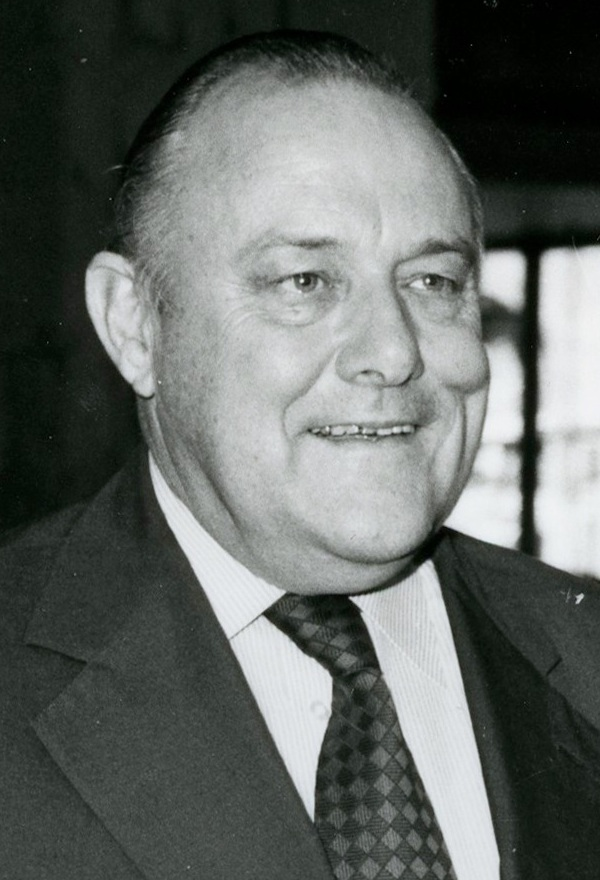
- Muldoon in 1978

31st Prime Minister of New Zealand
- In office 12 December 1975 – 26 July 1984
- Monarch: Elizabeth II
- Governors-General: Denis Blundell; Keith Holyoake; David Beattie
- Deputy: Brian Talboys (1975–1981); Duncan MacIntyre (1981–1984); Jim McLay (1984)
- Preceded by: Bill Rowling
- Succeeded by: David Lange

32nd Minister of Finance
- In office 12 December 1975 – 26 July 1984
- Prime Minister: Himself
- Preceded by: Bob Tizard
- Succeeded by: Roger Douglas
- In office 4 March 1967 – 8 December 1972
- Prime Minister: Keith Holyoake; Jack Marshall
- Preceded by: Harry Lake
- Succeeded by: Bill Rowling

4th Deputy Prime Minister of New Zealand
- In office 9 February 1972 – 8 December 1972
- Prime Minister: Jack Marshall
- Preceded by: Jack Marshall
- Succeeded by: Hugh Watt

21st Leader of the Opposition
- In office 9 July 1974 – 12 December 1975
- Prime Minister: Norman Kirk; Bill Rowling
- Deputy: Brian Talboys
- Preceded by: Jack Marshall
- Succeeded by: Bill Rowling
- In office 26 July 1984 – 29 November 1984
- Prime Minister: David Lange
- Deputy: Jim McLay
- Preceded by: David Lange
- Succeeded by: Jim McLay

Member of the New Zealand Parliament for Tamaki
- In office 26 November 1960 – 31 December 1991
- Preceded by: Bob Tizard
- Succeeded by: Clem Simich

Personal details
- Born: Robert David Muldoon; 25 September 1921 Auckland, New Zealand
- Died: 5 August 1992 (aged 70) Auckland, New Zealand
- Resting place: Purewa Cemetery, Meadowbank
- Party: National
- Spouse: Thea Flyger (m. 1951)
- Children: 3
- Profession: Accountant

Military service
- Allegiance: New Zealand
- Branch/service: New Zealand Military Forces
- Years of service: 1940–1946
- Rank: Sergeant
- Unit: 37th Battalion; Divisional Cavalry Regiment
- Battles/wars: World War II; Solomon Islands campaign; Italian campaign

Sir Robert David Muldoon GCMG CH PC (/mʌlˈduːn/; 25 September 1921 – 5 August 1992) was a New Zealand politician who served as the 31st prime minister of New Zealand, from 1975 to 1984, while leader of the National Party. Departing from National Party convention, Muldoon was a right-wing populist and economic nationalist, with a distinctive public persona described as reactionary, aggressive, and abrasive.

After a troubled childhood, Muldoon served as a corporal and sergeant in the army in the Second World War. After a career as a cost accountant, he was elected to the House of Representatives at the 1960 general election as the Member of Parliament (MP) for Tamaki, representing the National Party. Muldoon rose in the Second National Government to serve successively as Minister of Tourism (1967), Minister of Finance (1967–1972), and Deputy Prime Minister (1972). Over this time he built up an informal but solid backing amongst National's mostly rural right faction, which he called "Rob's Mob". After National lost the 1972 general election to the Labour Party, Muldoon used his connections to oust moderate party leader Jack Marshall and take his place, becoming Leader of the Opposition in 1974. Through Muldoon's ideological blend of moderate social liberalism and protectionist right-wing populism ("counterpunching", a term he coined) and the promise of a lucrative superannuation scheme, National enjoyed a resurgence. The early death of prime minister Norman Kirk severely weakened the Labour Party, and Muldoon soon led National to a decisive victory in the 1975 general election.

Muldoon came to power promising to lead "a Government of the ordinary bloke". He appointed himself Minister of Finance. Although he used populist rhetoric to rail against elites and the political establishment, he consistently tried to centralise power under himself during his premiership. His tenure was plagued by an economic pattern of stagnation, high inflation, growing unemployment, and high external debts and borrowing. Economic policies of the Muldoon Government included national superannuation, wage and price freezes, industrial incentives, and the Think Big industrial projects. He reintroduced and intensified the previous government's policies of the Dawn Raids, which racially targeted Pasifika overstayers. To engage with crime, Muldoon built "unusually close relationships" with criminal gangs; he personally favoured Black Power, and he and his wife Thea met with them on several occasions. In foreign policy, Muldoon adopted an anti-Soviet stance and re-emphasised New Zealand's defence commitments to the United States and Australia under the ANZUS pact. His refusal to stop a Springbok rugby tour of New Zealand divided the country and led to unprecedented civil disorder in 1981. Muldoon became more and more controversial as his premiership progressed; in addition to the controversy of the Springbok tour, he began a smear campaign against Labour MP Colin Moyle for alleged illegal homosexual activities and punched demonstrators at a protest.

Muldoon led his party to two additional election victories in 1978 and 1981, with the first-past-the-post electoral system keeping him in power despite losing the popular vote in each election except 1975. At the 1984 snap election, which Muldoon announced while intoxicated on live television, National finally suffered a significant defeat to Labour. Shortly before leaving office, amid a constitutional crisis, Muldoon was forced by the incoming Government to devalue the New Zealand dollar. In 1984, he was only the second prime minister (after Sir Keith Holyoake) to receive a knighthood while still in office. Mounting legal costs encouraged Muldoon to pursue a novelty acting career, but he remained in parliament until his retirement in 1992. He died shortly thereafter; the gang Black Power performed a haka at his funeral.

== Early life and family ==
Robert David Muldoon was born in Auckland on 25 September 1921 to parents James Henry Muldoon, a government inspector, and Amie Rusha Muldoon (née Browne). His father's family, the Muldoon (Irish: Ó Maoldúin) family, were of Irish descent; his grandfather was an Irish-born Scouser who emigrated from Liverpool. His grandfather was a Methodist evangelist and social worker.

At the age of five, 'Rob' Muldoon slipped while playing on the front gate, damaging his cheek and resulting in a distinctive lopsided smile that remained with him for life.

When Muldoon was aged eight, his father was admitted to Auckland Mental Hospital at Point Chevalier, where he died of parenchymatous syphilis nearly 20 years later in 1946. This left Muldoon's mother to raise him on her own. During this time Muldoon came under the strong formative influence of his maternal grandmother Jerusha, a committed socialist. Though Muldoon never accepted her creed, he did develop under her influence a potent ambition, a consuming interest in politics, and an abiding respect for New Zealand's welfare state. Muldoon won a scholarship to attend Mount Albert Grammar School from 1933 to 1936. He left school at age 15, finding work at Fletcher Construction and then the Auckland Electric Power Board as an arrears clerk. He studied accountancy by correspondence.

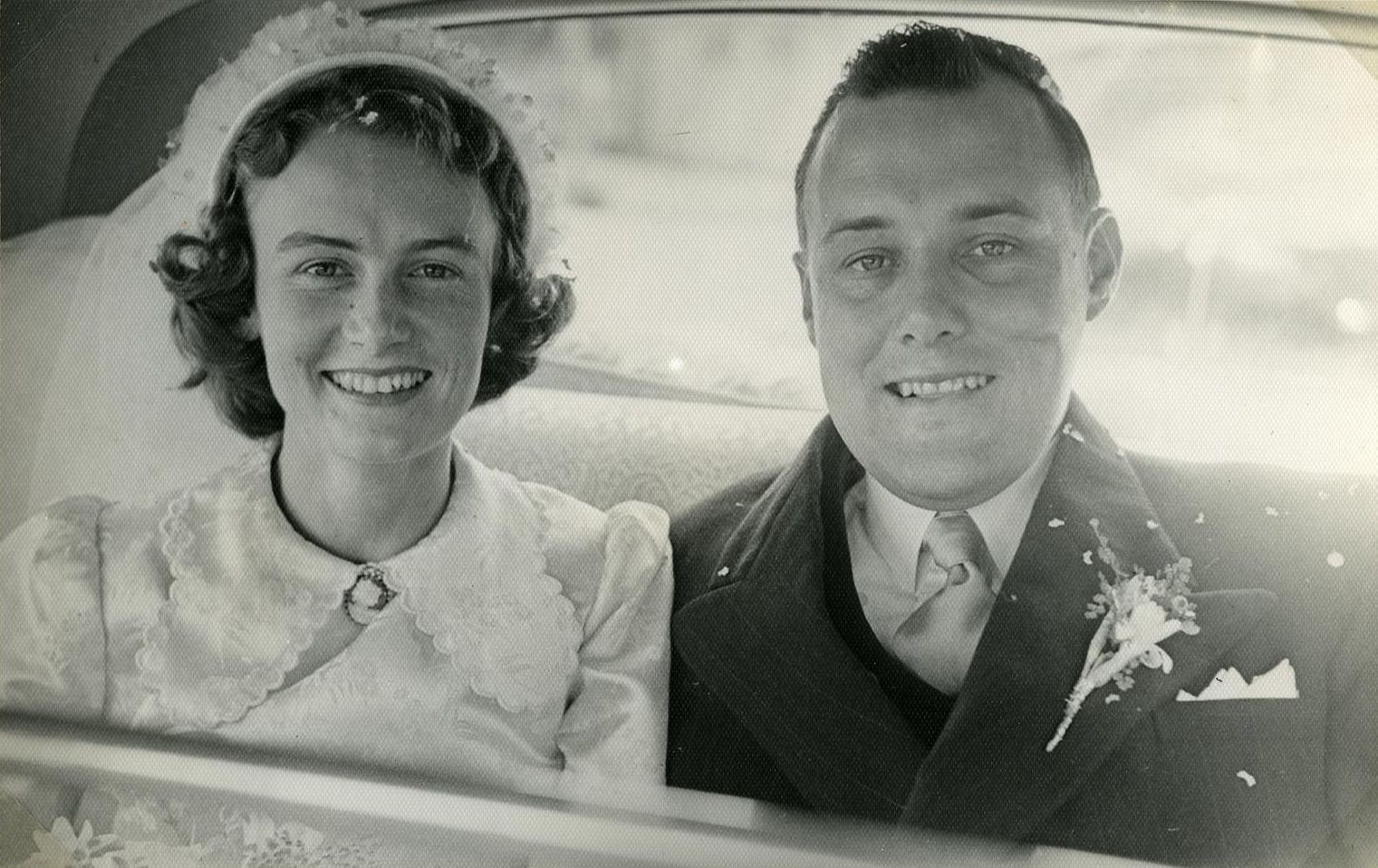
Robert Muldoon married Thea Flyger in 1951.

In 1951 Muldoon married Thea Dale Flyger, who he had met through the Junior Nationals. The couple had three children. Lady Muldoon, who died at age 87 in 2015, was appointed a Dame Commander of the Order of the British Empire in the 1993 New Year Honours and made a Companion of the Queen's Service Order in the 1986 New Year Honours. Muldoon was protective of his family life and, in particular, his wife. He said that people could comment about him but his family was off limits.

== Early career ==
Muldoon joined the New Zealand Military Forces in November 1940 during the Second World War, and served in the South Pacific with 37th Battalion. He was later sent to Italy and served with the same unit (Divisional Cavalry Regiment) as two other future National Party colleagues, Duncan MacIntyre and Jack Marshall. Muldoon completed his training as an accountant, sitting his final exams to become an accountant while in Italy, from Jack Marshall's tent. Muldoon then worked in a chartered accountancy firm in the United Kingdom for a year. According to Muldoon, Muldoon's 1977 autobiography, he returned to New Zealand after the war as the country's first fully qualified cost accountant, though there are no other sources confirming this.

=== Member of Parliament ===
New Zealand Parliament
| Years | Term | Electorate | Party |
|---|---|---|---|
| 1960–1963 | 33rd | Tamaki | National |
| 1963–1966 | 34th | Tamaki | National |
| 1966–1969 | 35th | Tamaki | National |
| 1969–1972 | 36th | Tamaki | National |
| 1972–1975 | 37th | Tamaki | National |
| 1975–1978 | 38th | Tamaki | National |
| 1978–1981 | 39th | Tamaki | National |
| 1981–1984 | 40th | Tamaki | National |
| 1984–1987 | 41st | Tamaki | National |
| 1987–1990 | 42nd | Tamaki | National |
| 1990–1991 | 43rd | Tamaki | National |

In March 1947 Muldoon joined the newly founded Mount Albert branch of the Junior Nationals, the youth wing of the conservative New Zealand National Party. He quickly became active in the party, making two sacrificial-lamb bids for Parliament against entrenched but vulnerable Labour incumbents in 1954 (Mount Albert) and 1957 (Waitemata). But in 1960 he won election as MP for the suburban Auckland electorate of Tamaki, winning against Bob Tizard, who had taken the former National seat in 1957. In 1960, an electoral swing brought Keith Holyoake back to power as Prime Minister of the Second National Government. Muldoon would represent the Tamaki constituency for the next 32 years.

Muldoon, along with Duncan MacIntyre and Peter Gordon who entered parliament in the same year, became known as the "Young Turks" (a common nickname for a group of young rebels) because of their criticism of the party's senior leadership. From his early years as an MP, Muldoon became known as Piggy; the epithet that would remain with him throughout his life even amongst those who were his supporters. Muldoon himself seemed to relish his controversial public profile.

Muldoon opposed both abortion and capital punishment. In 1961 he was one of ten National MPs to cross the floor and vote with the Opposition to remove capital punishment for murder from the Crimes Bill that the Second National Government had introduced. In 1977 he voted against the Contraception, Sterilisation, and Abortion Act 1977 when the issue also came up as a conscience vote.

Muldoon was appointed in 1961 to the Public Accounts Committee, which in 1962 became the Public Expenditure Committee. He was well informed on all aspects of the government, and could participate in many debates in Parliament.

=== Entry into Cabinet ===
Muldoon displayed a flair for debate and a diligence in his backbench work. Following the re-election of Holyoake's government at the 1963 general election, Muldoon was appointed as Under-Secretary to the Minister of Finance, Harry Lake. While holding this office, he took responsibility for the successful introduction of decimal currency into New Zealand. Initially there was some controversy over the design of the new coins and notes of the New Zealand dollar, but the issues were overcome in time for the new currency's introduction in July 1967.

=== Minister of Finance ===
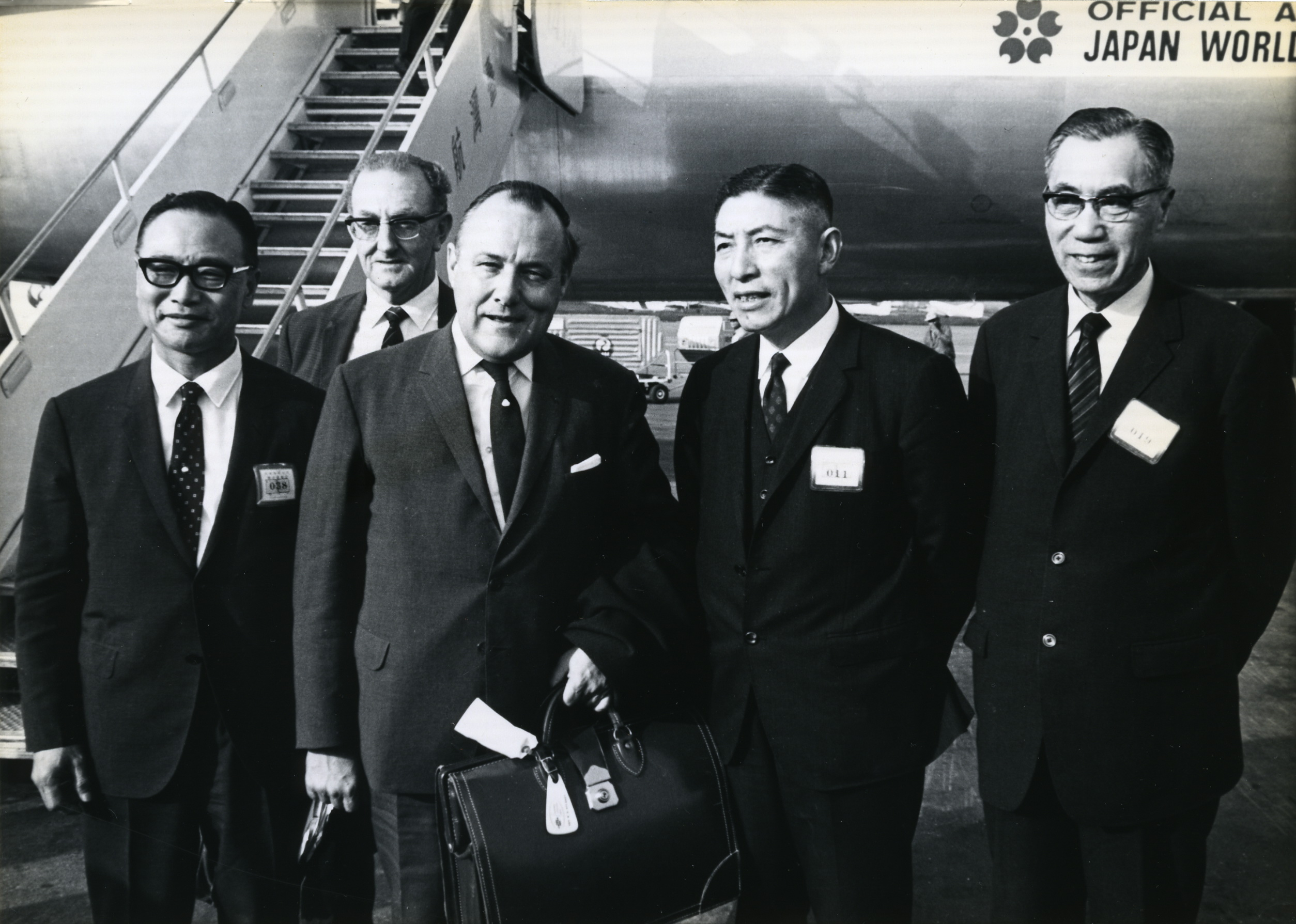
Muldoon in China as Minister of Finance, 1970

The Holyoake government was again re-elected at the 1966 general election. However, Muldoon was passed over as a new Cabinet minister following the election, with fellow Young Turks Duncan MacIntyre and Peter Gordon appointed ahead of him. Holyoake appointed Muldoon as Minister of Tourism and Minister Assistant to the Minister of Finance three months later.

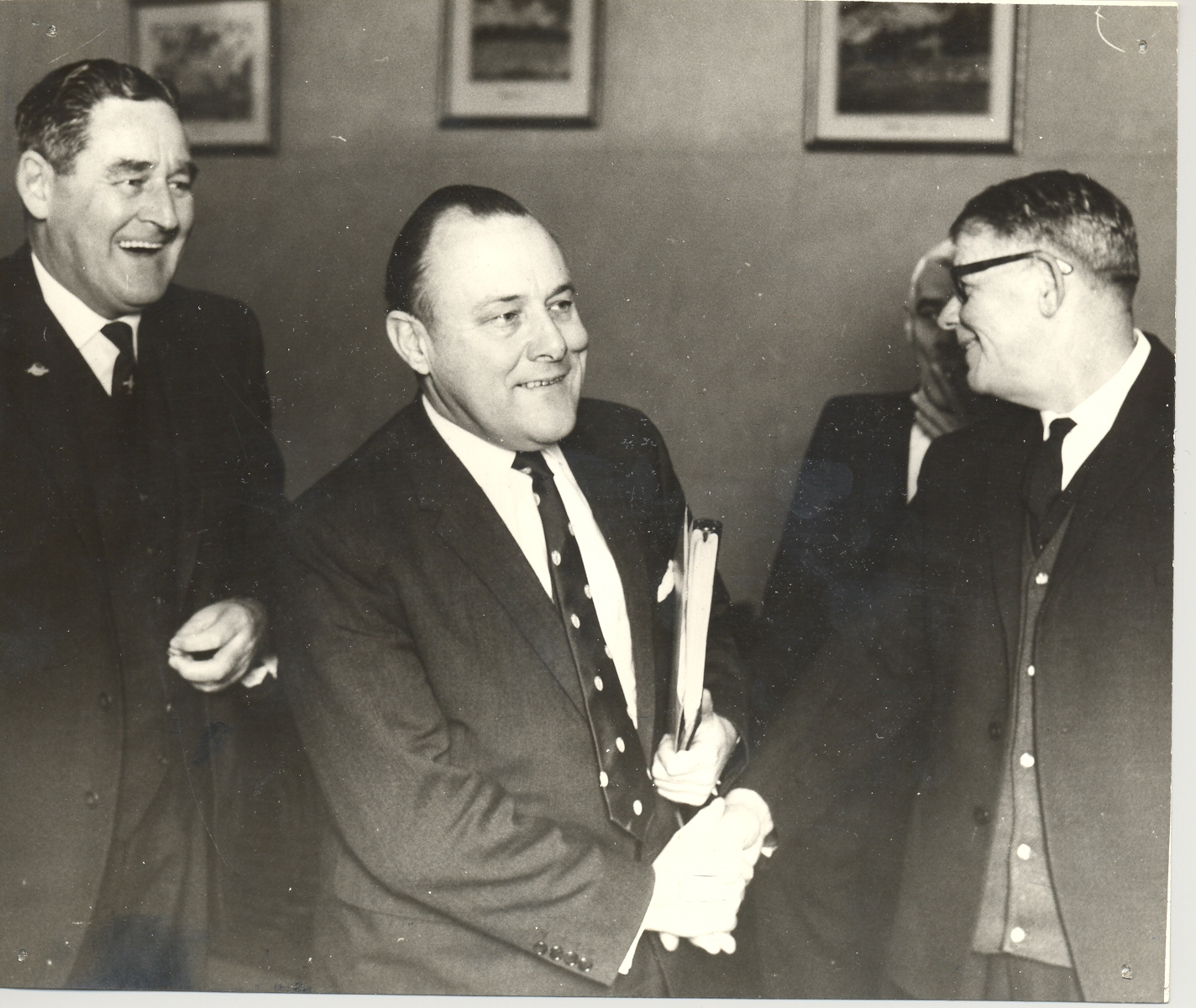
Muldoon (centre) as Minister of Finance, 26 June 1969; with him are Allan McCready MP and A J Shaw

When Harry Lake died suddenly of a heart attack in February 1967 (only days after Muldoon had joined the Cabinet), Prime Minister Keith Holyoake appointed Muldoon over Tom Shand (who himself died unexpectedly in December 1969) and Jack Marshall who had declined the post. Muldoon was to remain Minister of Finance for 14 of the next 17 years; at 45, he became the youngest Minister of Finance since the 1890s. At the time there was a serious economic crisis due to a down-turn in the price of wool.

In response to this crisis, Muldoon introduced mini-budgets instead of annual budgets, the first being presented on 4 May 1967. He cut and held public expenditure and increased indirect taxes to reduce demand. As a result, Muldoon was credited with the better economic performance New Zealand enjoyed, raising his profile among the public.

Muldoon established a considerable national profile rapidly; Holyoake would later credit his image, rather than that of his deputy, Jack Marshall, for the National Party's surprise victory in the 1969 election. He displayed a flair for the newly introduced medium of television (broadcasts began in New Zealand in 1960).

=== Deputy Prime Minister ===
When Holyoake stood down in 1972, Muldoon challenged Marshall for the top job; he lost by a narrow margin, but won unanimous election as deputy leader of the National Party and hence Deputy Prime Minister.

Marshall fought the 1972 election on a slogan of "Man For Man, The Strongest Team" – an allusion to Marshall's own low-key style, particularly compared to his deputy. Muldoon commented on Labour's election promises with "They can't promise anything because I've spent it all". Labour, led by the charismatic Norman Kirk, was swept into office, ending 12 years in power for National.

== Leader of the Opposition ==
Many members of the party caucus regarded Marshall as not up to the task of taking on the formidable new prime minister Norman Kirk. In July 1974, less than a year before a statutory general election, the caucus voted to hold a new leadership election. Marshall resigned after longtime colleague George Gair told him he stood no chance in a leadership vote, and Muldoon was elected unopposed as Leader of the Opposition on 9 July 1974. A day later, Muldoon's first autobiography, The Rise and Fall of a Young Turk, was published. The book was to be reprinted four times and sell 28,000 copies. Muldoon mastered television and packed public meetings with loyal supporters dubbed "Rob's Mob", who included many blue collar conservatives.

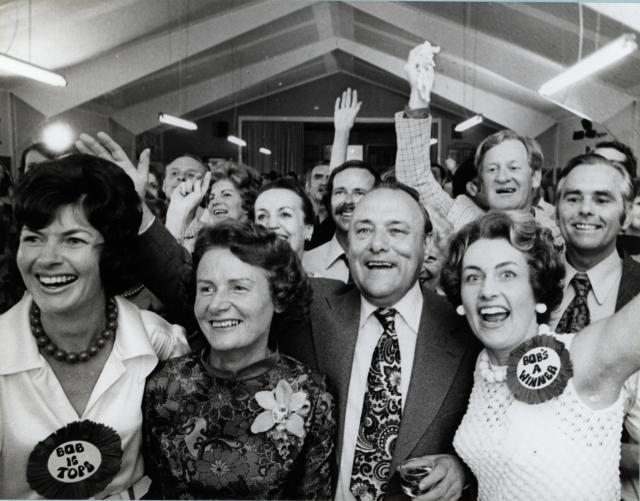
Muldoon and Thea Muldoon (centre left) with National members celebrating on election night, 29 November 1975

Muldoon relished the opportunity to match up against Kirk – but had it for only a short time, until Kirk's sudden unexpected death on 31 August 1974. Kirk was replaced as prime minister by Bill Rowling shortly afterwards. In the 1975 election, National ran on a platform of "New Zealand – The Way YOU Want It", a slogan Muldoon came up with himself. He promised a generous national superannuation scheme to replace Kirk and Rowling's employer-contribution superannuation scheme (which the "Dancing Cossacks" television advertisement implied would turn New Zealand into a communist state), and promised to fix New Zealand's "shattered economy". Labour responded with a campaign called Citizens for Rowling, described by Muldoon as "not even a thinly disguised" attack on himself. At the election, Muldoon overwhelmed Rowling, reversing the 55-32 Labour majority to a 55–32 National majority.

== Prime Minister (1975–1984) ==
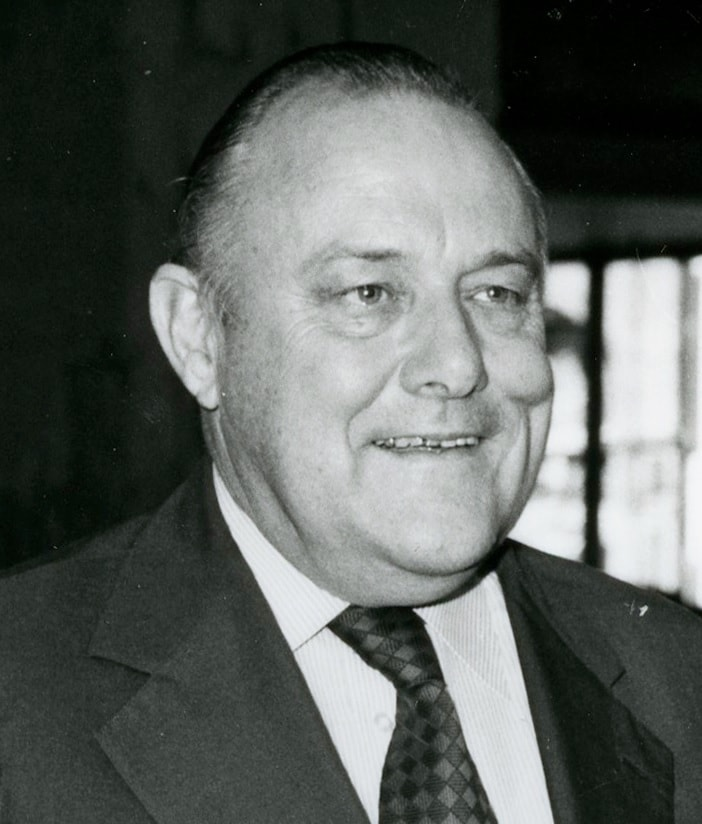
- Premiership of Robert Muldoon; 12 December 1975 – 26 July 1984
- Monarch: Elizabeth II
- Cabinet: Third National Government of New Zealand
- Party: New Zealand National Party
- Election: 1975, 1978, 1981
- Appointed by: Denis Blundell

=== First term: 1975–1978 ===
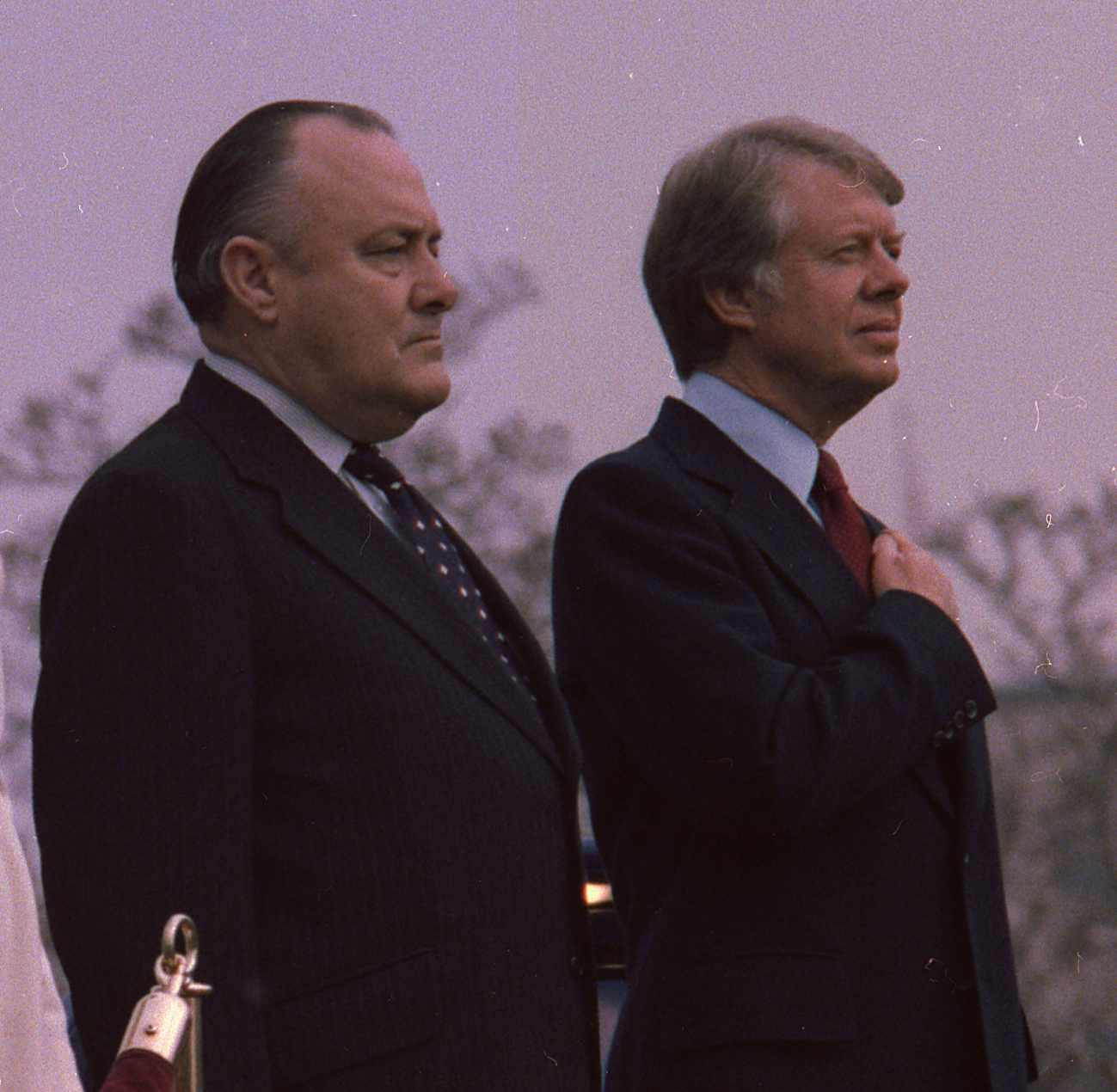
Robert Muldoon and US President Jimmy Carter during an official visit to the United States, 1977

Muldoon was sworn in as New Zealand's 31st Prime Minister on 12 December 1975, at the age of 54. A populist, he promised to lead "a Government of the ordinary bloke". His government immediately faced problems with the economy; a recession from June 1976 to March 1978 caused New Zealand's economy to shrink 4.1% and unemployment to rise 125%.

==== Superannuation and Fitzgerald v. Muldoon ====
One of Muldoon's first actions was to issue a press release stating that he would advise the Governor-General to abolish Labour's superannuation scheme without new legislation. Muldoon felt that the dissolution would be immediate, and he would later introduce a bill in parliament to retroactively make the abolition legal. The Bill of Rights 1689 was then invoked in the case of Fitzgerald v Muldoon and Others, The Chief Justice, Sir Richard Wild, declared that Muldoon's actions were illegal as they had violated Article 1 of the Bill of Rights, which provides "that the pretended power of dispensing with laws or the execution of laws by regal authority...is illegal." Ultimately Muldoon, as a member of the executive branch, was acting beyond his prescribed powers, as only parliament has the power to make and unmake laws. Therefore, Muldoon's actions were not only illegal, but unconstitutional, as they violated the rule of law and the sovereignty of parliament. This is encapsulated in Sir Richard Wild's judgment, in which he stated that "The Act of Parliament in force required that those deductions and contributions must be made, yet here was the Prime Minister announcing that they need not be made. I am bound to hold that in so doing he was purporting to suspend the law without consent of Parliament. Parliament had made the law. Therefore the law could be amended or suspended only by Parliament or with the authority of Parliament."

Economics correspondent Brian Gaynor has claimed that Muldoon's policy of reversing Labour's saving scheme cost him a chance to transform the New Zealand economy. The National superannuation scheme was one of Muldoon's 1975 election promises: it was described as a "generous" policy, and was effective in realigning Muldoon's support from elderly voters. However, the high cost of the scheme had an immense impact on the budget; Margaret McClure determined that the scheme's superannuation was substantially higher than that of similar policies elsewhere in the world. The United States' superannuation for a married couple was effectively 49% of the average wage rate, and 40% in Australia and 38% in Britain; however, New Zealand's was set at 80%. Therefore, by 1981 the spending on this scheme had doubled, and made up 17.3% of the government's budget. This resulted in other social policy programs, particularly education, being deprived of funds during this period. Justice Stephen Kós has also stated that the "increase, without contribution, was utterly unsustainable."

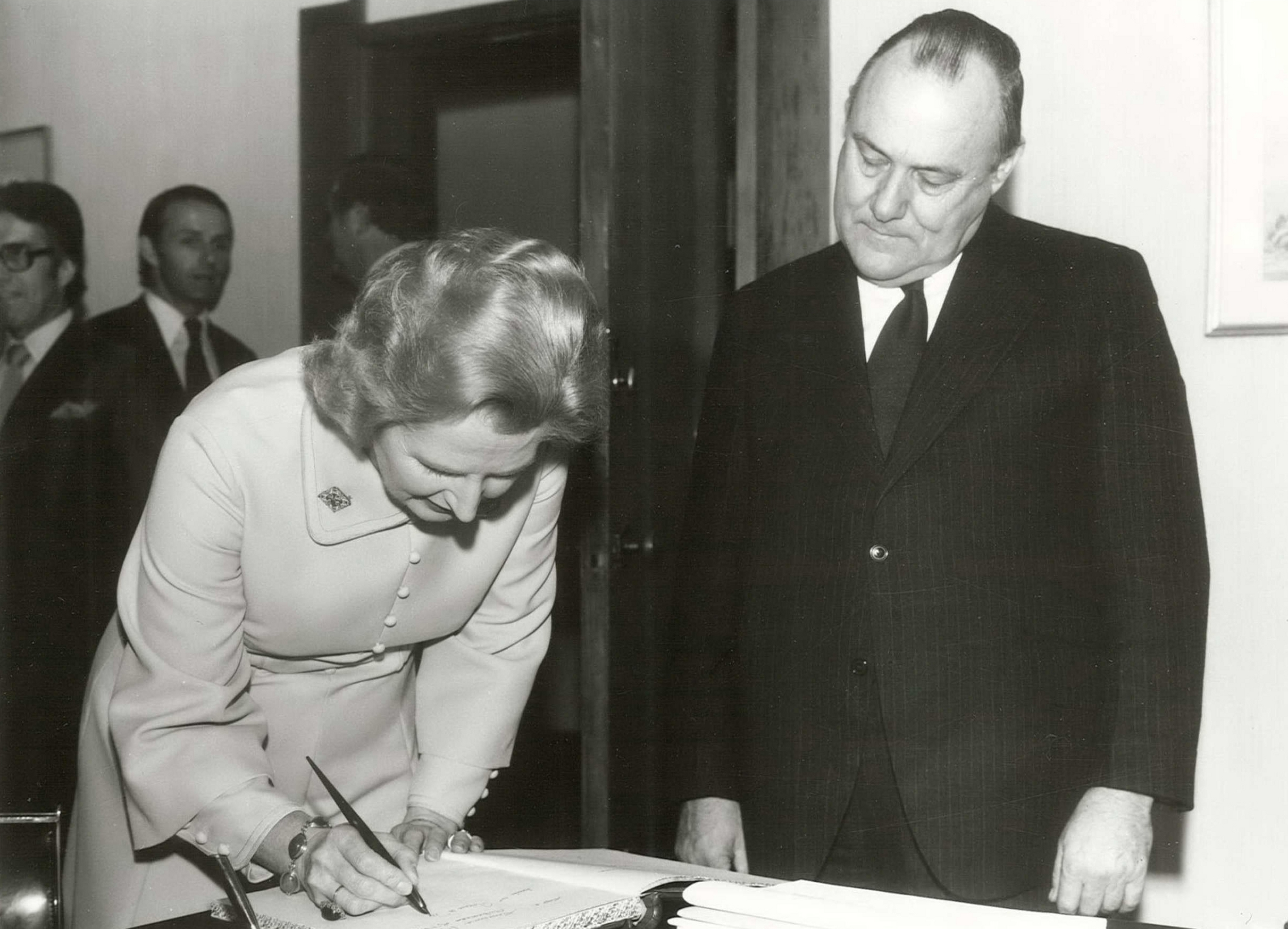
Muldoon meets British Conservative Party leader Margaret Thatcher, Wellington, September 1976

==== Economic challenges ====
Muldoon's government inherited a number of economic and social challenges. During the late 1960s and early 1970s, New Zealand's economy had significantly declined due to several international developments: a decline in international wool prices in 1966, Britain joining the European Economic Community in 1973 (which deprived New Zealand of its formerly most important export market), and the 1973 oil crisis. The "Muldoon Years" were to feature Muldoon's obstinate and resourceful attempts to maintain New Zealand's "cradle to the grave" welfare state, dating from 1935, in the face of a changing world. Muldoon had remained National's Finance spokesman when he became party leader, and as a result became his own Minister of Finance when National won power in 1975—thus concentrating enormous power in his hands. He is the last to hold both posts to date.

In his first term (1975–1978) Muldoon focused on reducing expenditure, but struggled with the growing cost of his own superannuation scheme, partly due to the many tax rebates and exemptions he passed for lower income earners. By March 1978 the economy was growing again, but unemployment and inflation remained high.

==== The Dawn Raids ====
Robert Muldoon continued his Labour predecessor Prime Minister Norman Kirk's policy of arresting and deporting Pacific Islander overstayers which had begun in 1974. Since the 1950s, the New Zealand government had encouraged substantial emigration from several Pacific countries including Samoa, Tonga, and Fiji to fill a labour shortage caused by the post–war economic boom. Consequently, the Pacific Islander population in New Zealand had grown to 45,413 by 1971, with a substantial number overstaying their visas. The economic crisis of the early 1970s led to increased crime, unemployment and other social ailments, which disproportionately involved the Pacific Islander community.

In July 1974, Muldoon as opposition leader had promised to cut immigration and to "get tough" on law and order issues. He claimed that the Labour government's immigration policies had contributed to the economic recession and undermined the "New Zealand way of life" by causing a housing shortage. During the 1975 general elections, the National Party had played a controversial electoral advertisement that was later criticised for stoking negative racial sentiments about Polynesian migrants. Muldoon's government accelerated and increased the Kirk government's police raids against Pacific overstayers. These operations involved special police squads conducting dawn raids on the homes of overstayers throughout New Zealand. Overstayers and their families were usually deported to their countries of origin.

The Dawn Raids were widely condemned by various sections of New Zealand society, including the Pacific Islander and Māori communities, church groups, employers and workers' unions, anti-racist groups, and the opposition Labour Party. The raids were also criticised by elements of the New Zealand Police and the ruling National Party for damaging relations with the Pacific Islander community. At the time, Pacific Islanders comprised only one third of the overstayers (who were primarily from the United Kingdom, Australia, and South Africa), but made up 86% of those arrested and prosecuted for overstaying. The Muldoon government's treatment of overstayers also damaged relations with Pacific countries like Samoa and Tonga, and generated criticism from the South Pacific Forum. By 1979, the Muldoon government terminated the Dawn Raids, concluding that they had failed to alleviate the economic problems.

==== Moyle Affair ====
Muldoon, in Parliament, accused opposition MP and former Cabinet minister Colin Moyle in November 1976 of having been questioned by the police on suspicion of homosexual activities a year earlier. Homosexual activity between men was illegal in New Zealand at the time. After changing his story several times, Moyle resigned from Parliament. He later said that he had not been obliged to resign, but had done so because "the whole thing just made me sick". It has been suggested that Muldoon saw him as a leadership threat and acted accordingly. In a 1990 interview, Moyle said that the scandal had made him a "sadder and wiser person". The head of the prime minister's department, Gerald Hensley, wrote that Muldoon had told later him outing Moyle was the thing he regretted most in his life.

The subsequent 1977 by-election was won by David Lange, and the attention that this got him helped propel Lange to the leadership of the Labour Party and his landslide victory over Muldoon in the 1984 election.

==== Appointment of Holyoake as Governor-General ====
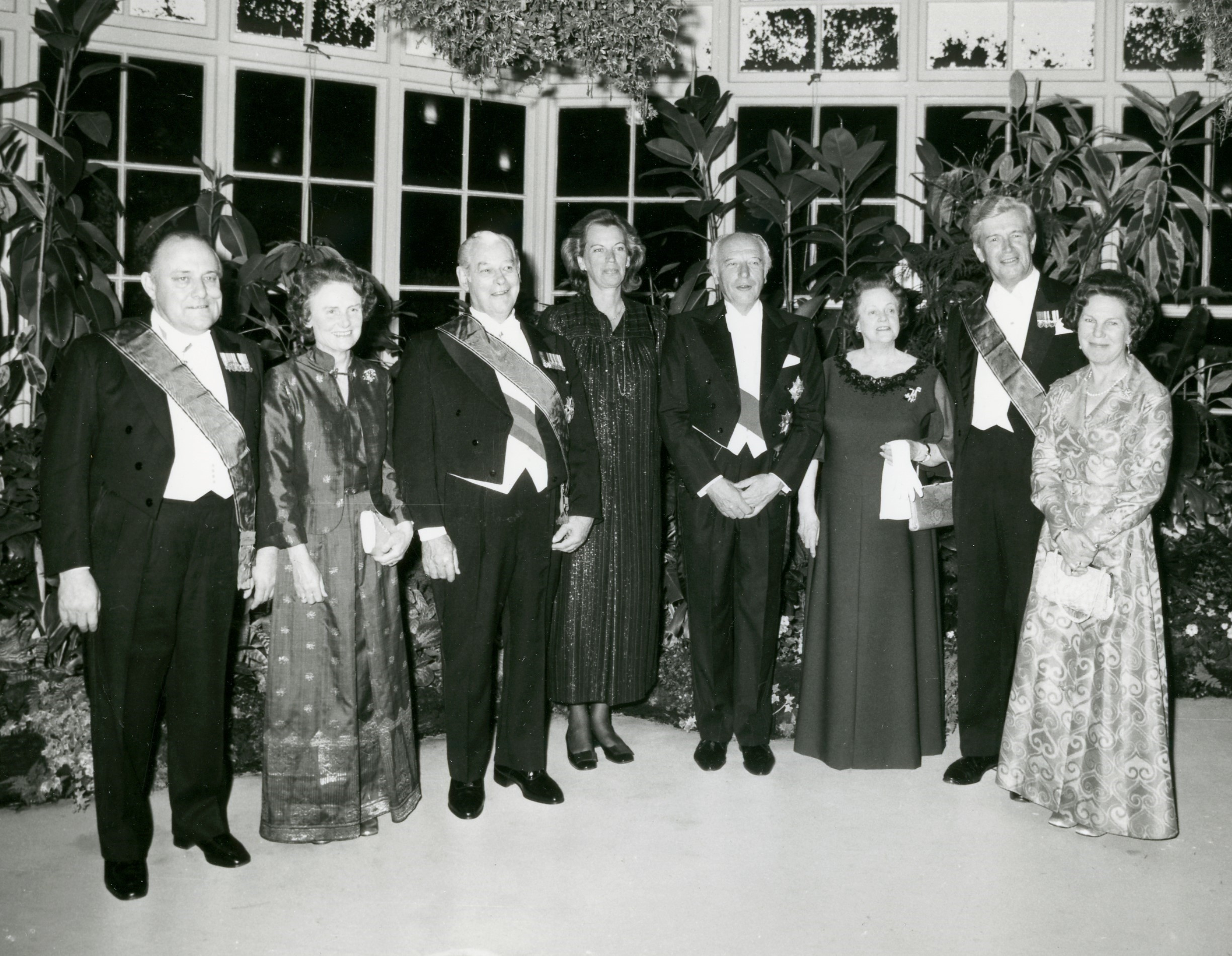
Prime Minister Muldoon (far left) and Governor-General Sir Keith Holyoake (third from left) with West German President Walter Scheel (fourth from right), pictured in the conservatory at Government House Wellington in October 1978

As prime minister, Muldoon had the sole right to advise Elizabeth II, Queen of New Zealand, on whom to appoint as governor-general. With the term of Sir Denis Blundell as Governor-General coming to an end in 1977, a new appointee was needed. Muldoon sent a message to the Queen on 15 December 1976 putting forward former prime minister Sir Keith Holyoake as his appointee, which the Queen approved. The announcement was made by the Queen at the end of her tour of New Zealand on 7 March 1977, from the Royal Yacht Britannia in Lyttelton Harbour.

This choice was controversial because Holyoake was a sitting Cabinet minister. Both opponents and supporters of Muldoon's government claimed that it was a political appointment; a number of National MPs, including his deputy, disagreed with the precedent of having a politician as governor-general. The Leader of the Opposition, Bill Rowling complained that he had not been consulted on the appointment, and then stated that he would act to remove Holyoake as Governor-General should the Labour Party win the 1978 general election. As a result of the appointment, Holyoake resigned from Parliament, resulting in the Pahiatua by-election of 1977. He was succeeded in his seat by John Falloon.

==== 1978 election ====
A month before the general election Muldoon remained the preferred prime minister, though his support slipped from 60% to 48% while Rowling's rose 8 points to 38%. At the election, held on 25 November, National lost three seats and it dropped 7.9 percentage points in the vote. Although the party had been returned to office with a majority of seats, it had lost the popular vote to a resurgent Labour Party. National Party President George Chapman argued National struggled at the election because of the many boundary changes and issues with the electoral roll, contrary to Muldoon's claims that the media going against National had caused the decline in support.

=== Second term: 1978–1981 ===
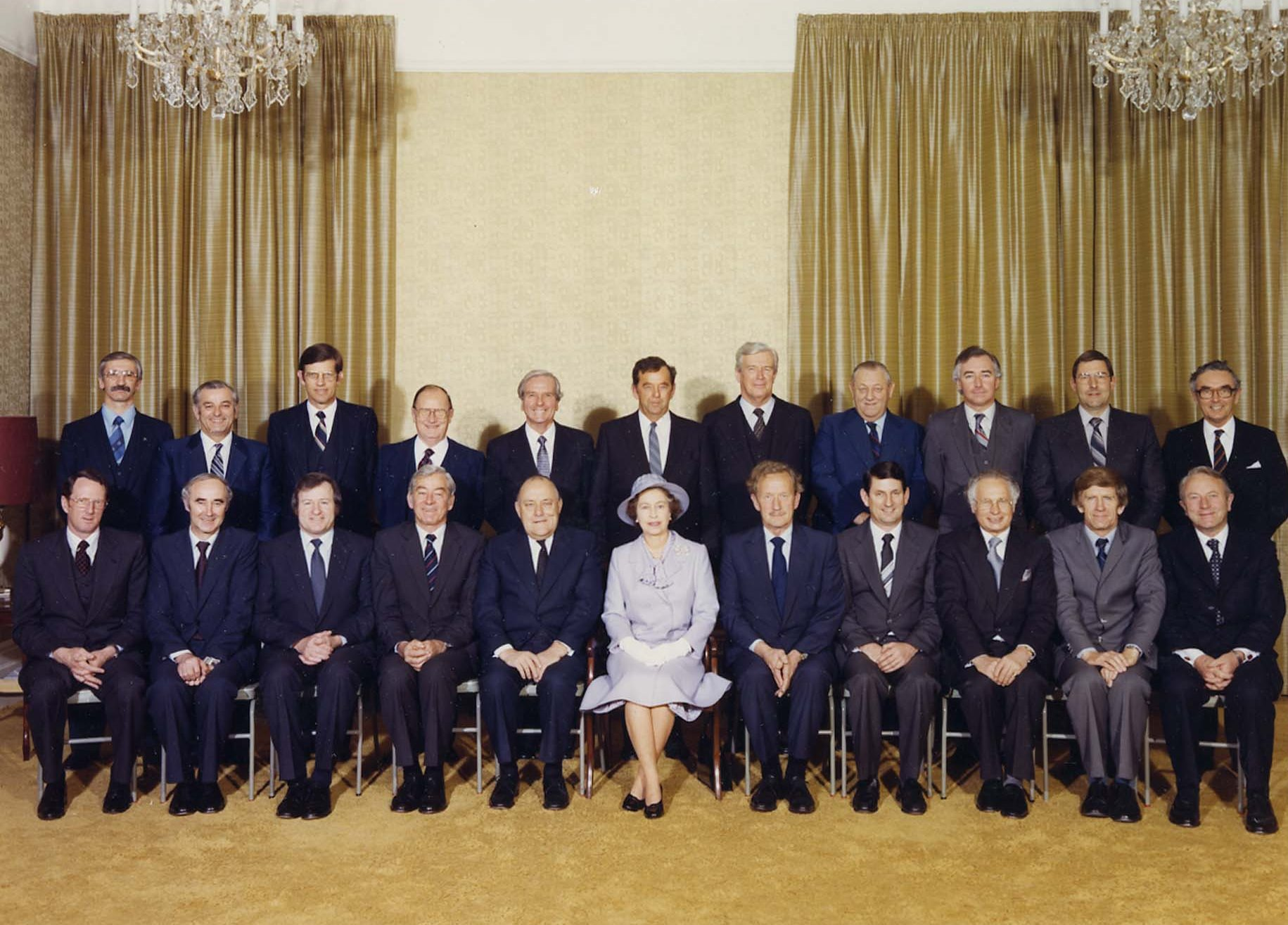
Cabinet photograph during Queen Elizabeth II's tour of New Zealand in October 1981; Muldoon is seated on the Queen's right

==== Taxation ====
Muldoon initially opposed indirect consumer taxation on the basis that it would penalise poor people and increase inflation due to compensatory wage increases. However, in May 1979 he attempted to increase tax revenue by levying 10% to 20% taxes on a wide range of goods, including petrol, lawnmowers, caravans and boats. The taxes were criticised for being discriminatory, ineffective, and a "quick fix" that precluded necessary fundamental reform of the taxation system (as there were no income tax cuts to reflect the shift to indirect taxation). The boat and caravan levies, in particular, crippled both industries, as potential buyers could not afford the 20% tax on top of the construction costs, resulting in additional unemployment as workers were laid off.

==== Communism and the Soviet Union ====
As with other conservative governments during the Cold War, Muldoon adopted an anti-Soviet stance. As a long-time National Party activist, Muldoon rejected Communism as an "alien" collectivist philosophy. During the television programme Gallery in the later 1960s, he also rebuked left-leaning clergymen who had criticised apartheid in South Africa for failing to oppose Soviet communism. Muldoon was critical of Communist influence in New Zealand's trade union movement. He also viewed the Moscow-aligned Socialist Unity Party (SUP), a break-away faction from the Communist Party of New Zealand, as a Soviet fifth column that was trying to subvert New Zealand and the South Pacific island states. In various speeches and press releases, he would accuse the SUP and other Communist groups of instigating strikes and organising protests against US naval visits and New Zealand's sporting contacts with South Africa.

As prime minister, he accepted both the American and Chinese views that the Soviet Union was an aggressive power with hegemonic ambitions in the South Pacific. Muldoon would also join the United States President Jimmy Carter and other Western leaders in condemning the Soviet invasion of Afghanistan in 1979 and boycotting the 1980 Summer Olympics. However, his government did not participate in the US-led trade boycott against the Soviet Union because it would have hurt New Zealand's predominantly agricultural export economy. In 1980, the National government also expelled the Soviet Ambassador, Vsevolod Sofinski, for providing funding to the SUP. Despite his antagonism towards the Soviet Union and domestic Communist movements, Muldoon's government still maintained economic relations with the Soviet Union.

==== Arthur Allan Thomas ====
After David Yallop drew Muldoon's attention to the case of Arthur Allan Thomas, twice convicted for the murders of farming couple Harvey and Jeannette Crewe, Muldoon asked Robert Adams-Smith QC to review the case. Adams-Smith reported 'an injustice may have been done', and Muldoon pushed through a royal pardon for Thomas. A subsequent Royal Commission of Inquiry exonerated Thomas and recommended he be paid $950,000 as compensation for the time he served.

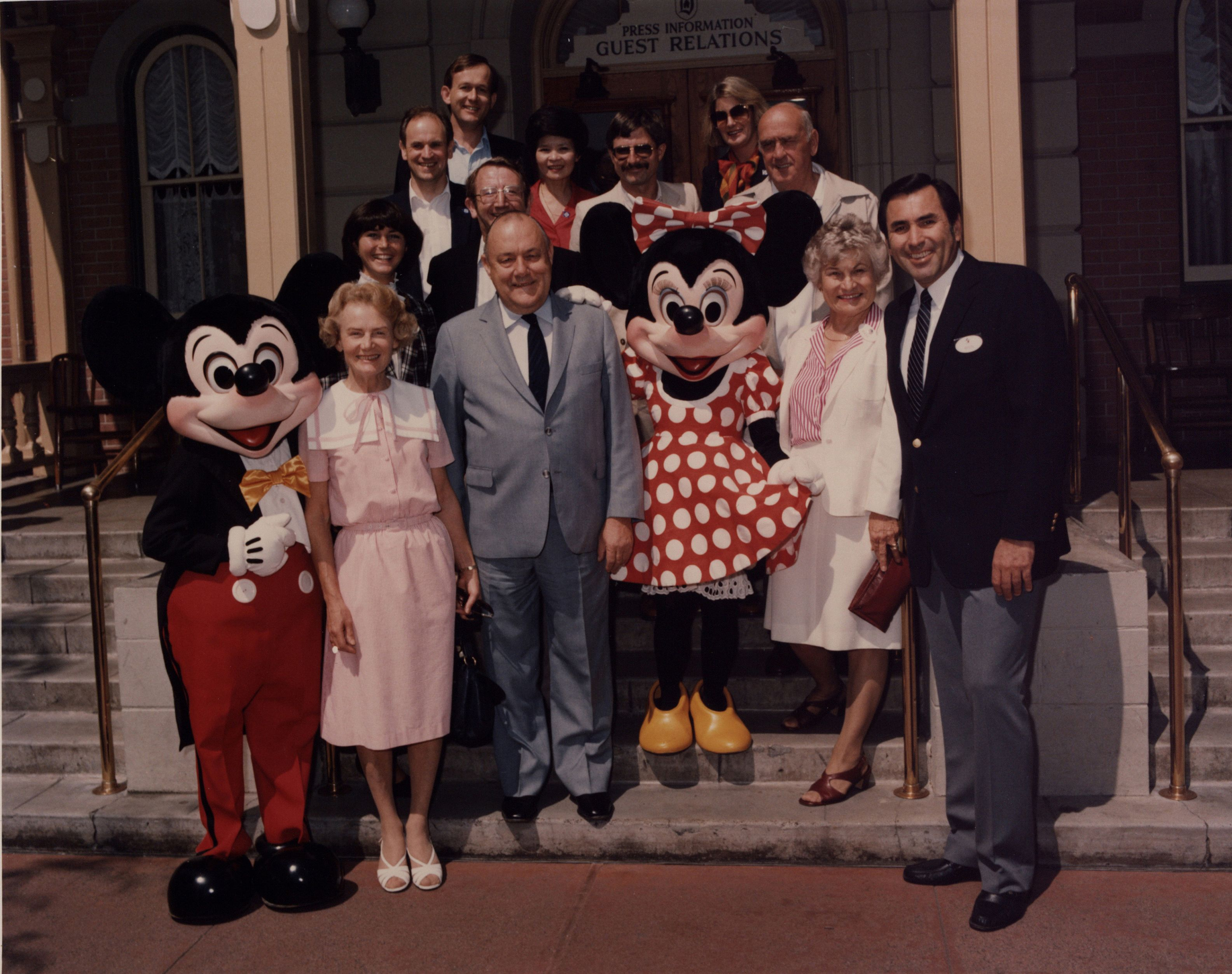
Muldoon on an incongruous trip to Disneyland, in November 1977. Despite an abrasive personality, the Prime Minister was known for his eccentric behaviour – including an unexplained affection for Mickey Mouse.

==== East Coast Bays by-election ====
Muldoon's appointment of Frank Gill as New Zealand's ambassador to the United States led to a by-election in Gill's seat of East Coast Bays. Muldoon's favoured candidate was Sue Wood, at the time National's vice president and later party President. National selected the economically liberal Don Brash, a future Governor of the Reserve Bank of New Zealand and later leader of the National Party, as its candidate. Brash lost the by-election to Social Credit's Gary Knapp, a major upset and a blow for Muldoon's leadership. Muldoon blamed Brash and the party organisation for the defeat, but was strongly rebuked by the party for this stance. The loss of the by-election provided the catalyst for growing opposition within the National Party to Muldoon's leadership.

==== Colonels' Coup ====
Following the loss of the East Coast Bays by-election, Muldoon faced an abortive attempt in October–November 1980 to oust him as leader. Known as the Colonels' Coup after its originators—Jim Bolger, Jim McLay and Derek Quigley—it aimed to replace Muldoon with his more economically liberal deputy, Brian Talboys. Muldoon, who was overseas at the time, saw the plotters off with relative ease, especially since Talboys himself was a reluctant draftee. No other serious challenge to his leadership occurred in his years as prime minister until after the 1984 election.

==== Springbok Tour ====
Professing a belief that politics should not interfere with sport, Muldoon resisted pressure to bar the 1981 tour by the Springboks, the national rugby union squad of apartheid-era South Africa. By allowing "the Tour", Muldoon was accused of breaking the 1977 Gleneagles Agreement (to form a common policy on sporting with South Africa amongst the Commonwealth, signed after the boycott of the Montreal Olympics in 1976). Muldoon noted, however, that the Gleneagles Agreement had been amended and, in an article in The Times, that he had not broken the Gleneagles Agreement because "New Zealand and subsequently other countries made it clear that they could not subscribe to an agreement which required them to abrogate the freedoms of their sportsmen and prohibit sporting contacts". "The Tour", as it has become known, provoked massive public demonstrations and some of the worst social schisms New Zealand has ever seen. Muldoon came down firmly on the pro-Tour side, arguing that sport and politics should be kept separate. He argued that his refusal to ban the Springboks was anti-authoritarian, leaving it up to individual consciences whether to play sports with representatives of apartheid. He also argued that allowing their rugby team to tour did not mean supporting apartheid.

==== Think Big ====
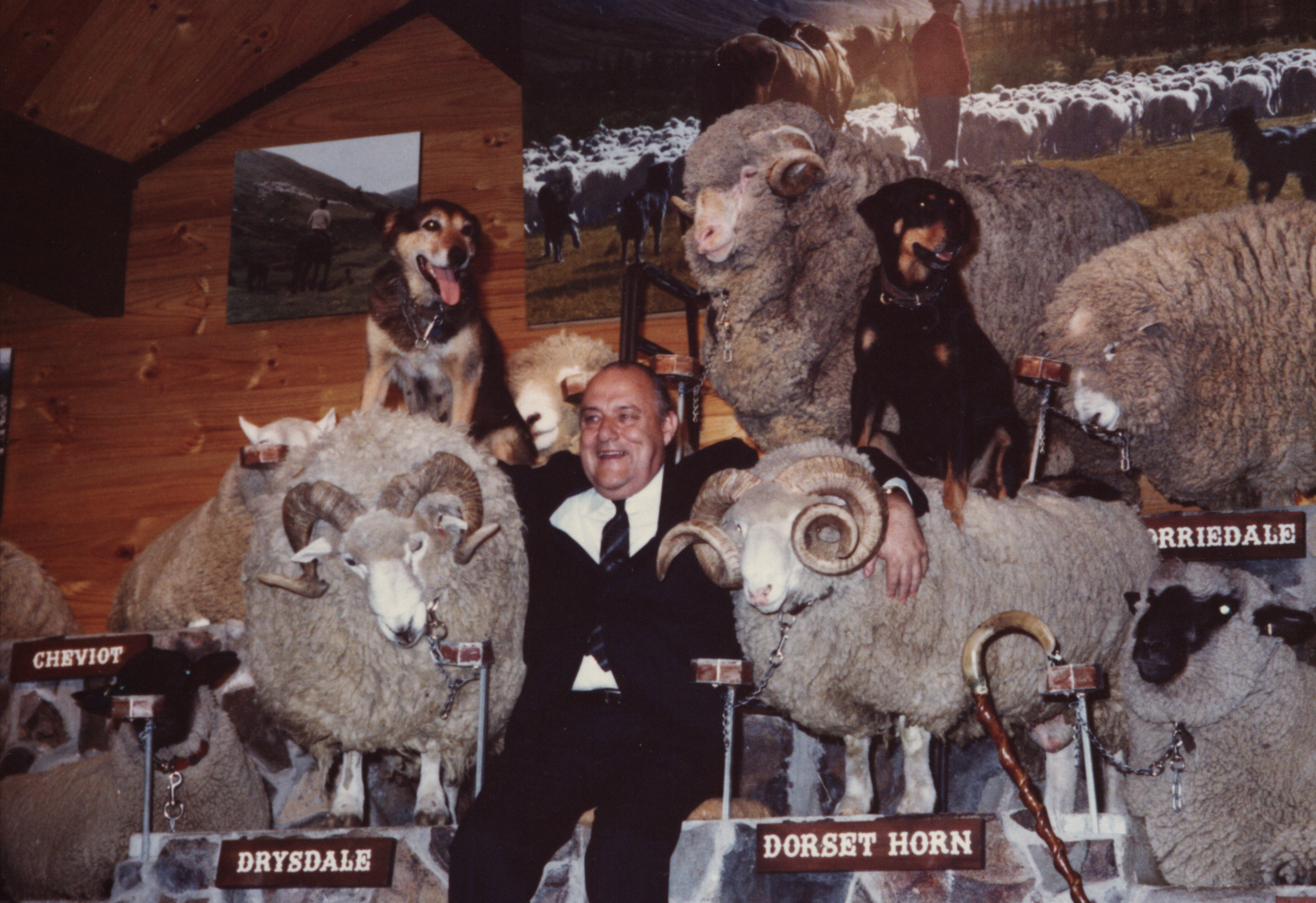
Muldoon shows a lighter side: opening the Agrodome (agricultural centre) in Rotorua, November 1980

The Iranian Revolution had led to the second oil shock of 1979. Economic growth in New Zealand had only just begun to recover from the 1976–78 recession when the oil shock hit. Economic pressures continued to build: Muldoon tried to control spiraling increases in wages and inflation through a trade-off with the trade-union leadership: a reduction in the tax rate in exchange for an agreement not to press for further rounds of wage increases, similar to The Accord reached in Australia in 1983. The Federation of Labour's President Jim Knox, who Muldoon did not get along with, refused to co-operate. In response, Muldoon introduced his Think Big strategy, in which the government borrowed heavily to invest in large-scale industrial projects, predominantly energy-related. The projects' goals were to make New Zealand more than 60% self-sufficient in energy, and to produce 425,000 jobs. The Clyde dam, which generated electricity to be used to manufacture aluminium for export, was typical of Muldoon's efforts to shelter New Zealand from the troubles of the rest of the world. This dam was described to symbolise "fortress New Zealand".

The Think Big projects were a major part of Muldoon's legacy. However, when presenting the idea to the public, Muldoon vastly exaggerated their benefits. Many projects had severe budget overruns of as much as ten times their expected costs. This soon worsened the balance of payments deficit and inflation, as all of the equipment and technology used was imported. As a result of increased oil prices, a decline in New Zealand's terms of trade, and less than expected returns from the Think Big projects, Muldoon was forced to borrow more money. Despite Muldoon's promise before the 1975 election to erase debt, the already high levels of debt remained. The advisability of the Think Big projects remains controversial.

Concerned about the use of foreign exchange during the 1970s' oil crises, Muldoon supported a scheme to retrofit cars to use natural gas or a dual-fuel gas–petrol system. The 1979 budget introduced incentives for the conversions, and New Zealand emerged as the first country to make dual-fuel cars commonplace. However, the projected continued rise in oil prices did not transpire.

==== 1981 election ====
Despite the turmoil over the Springbok Tour, Muldoon's Government won the subsequent 1981 election, held on 28 November. On the night, National won 46 seats to Labour's 44 and Social Credit's two, but a recount gave National the seat of Gisborne by 150 votes, and a majority of one. Muldoon had to be persuaded not to make the Springbok Tour an issue in the election, and the National Party's campaign instead focused on Think Big. Again, Muldoon's Government received fewer votes than the opposition Labour Party.

=== Third term: 1981–1984 ===
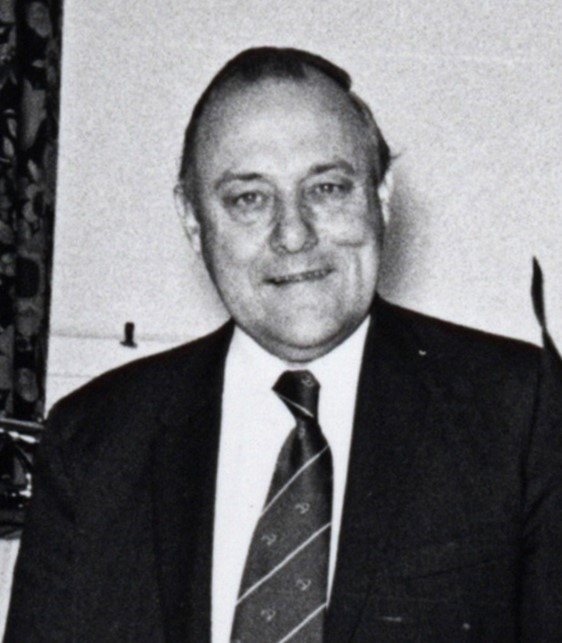
Muldoon in 1981

Muldoon's third term was tumultuous. With a one-seat majority he faced an increasingly restless backbench who wanted the National Party to adopt a more economically liberal stance. Early in 1982 Derek Quigley, a junior minister who had been demoted for his role in the Colonel's Coup of 1980, spoke out against Think Big, casting doubts on its benefits. As a result, Muldoon asked him to apologise or resign from Cabinet; Quigley chose to resign. Muldoon had also fallen out with former supporter and millionaire businessman Bob Jones, who made good on a threat to create his own party in protest at Muldoon's economic policies. In 1983 the New Zealand Party was formed by Jones and took a significant share of the vote at the 1984 election.

==== Economic recession and wage and price freeze ====
With Think Big failing to deliver on its promise, Muldoon imposed an incomes policy: a freeze on wages and most prices (items excluded included fresh meat, frozen meat, items sold at auction and "women's fashion clothing other than standard lines"), interest rates and dividends across the country in April 1982. Against this he offered a "sweetener" of a tax cut which cost the New Zealand treasury approximately a billion New Zealand dollars. Ultimately the Wage and Price Freeze, which had been intended only to last for a year, remained in force for nearly two years and was repealed by the incoming Labour Government. Years later, Muldoon admitted that the freeze was a political mistake.

The second recession during Muldoon's premiership hit in September 1982. New Zealand's economy contracted again by 3% and unemployment hit 5.1% by 1983, and net emigration remained high.

==== Falklands War ====
In 1982, Muldoon's government supported the British in the Falklands War. While New Zealand did not directly participate in the conflict, Muldoon undertook to send the frigates HMNZS Canterbury and HMNZS Waikato to the Indian Ocean to relieve Royal Navy frigates, so that they could in their turn deploy in the conflict. New Zealand also broke off its diplomatic relations with Argentina. In defence of his support for the war, Muldoon wrote an article that was published in The Times, entitled "Why we Stand by our Mother Country":

We are a free and independent nation but in time of trouble we stand with our mother country...New Zealand's decision to break off diplomatic relations with Argentina over the Falklands, immediately after Britain had done so, was not because of Britain's support on the sporting issue. The reason goes much deeper than that. It is in the context of the statement made by a Labour Prime Minister of New Zealand in 1939: "Where Britain goes, we go." We see the Falklands as British territory and the Falklands Islanders as subjects of our Queen. We live at the end of the line and we know the feeling of isolation...With the Falklands Islands, it is family. Historically, Britain has so often on great occasions thrown up the leader that the occasion demanded. I regard Margaret Thatcher as one of the finest and straightest politicians I have ever met...In 1939 we learned the folly of appeasement. A great catastrophe was the price that was paid. The military rulers of Argentina must not be appeased. New Zealand will back Britain all the way.

In the British House of Commons, Margaret Thatcher responded by saying that "The New Zealand Government and people have been absolutely magnificent in their support of this country, of the Falkland Islanders and of the rule of liberty and the rule of law. I shall gladly convey that to Mr. Muldoon, who, only yesterday, reminded me 'Don't forget. In New Zealand, we are still a member of the same family.'"

==== Closer Economic Relations ====
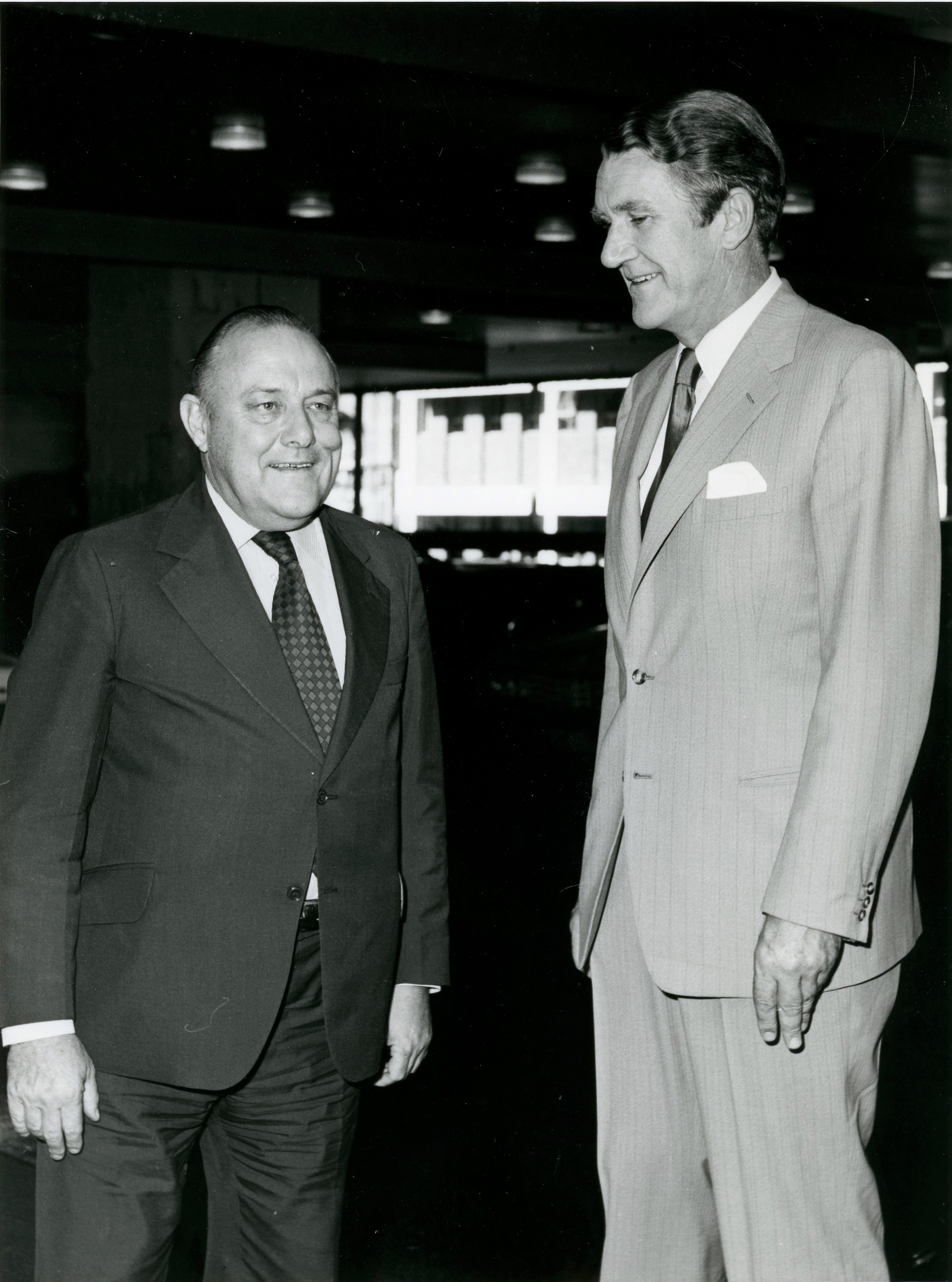
Muldoon and Australian Prime Minister Malcolm Fraser, meeting in 1978 in Sydney. It was an open secret that the two men did not get along, and even hated each other – largely due to Muldoon's rudeness towards Fraser.

Muldoon initiated a Closer Economic Relations (CER) free trade agreement with Australia to liberalise trade, which came into effect from New Year's Day 1982. The aim of total free trade between the two countries was achieved in 1990, five years ahead of schedule.

==== Nuclear ships policy and the snap election of 1984 ====
Ultimately, the end of Muldoon's government came following a late-night clash with National backbencher Marilyn Waring over highly contentious Opposition-sponsored nuclear-free New Zealand legislation, in which Waring told him she would cross the floor (giving the Opposition a victory). On 14 June 1984, a visibly drunk Muldoon called a snap election for 14 July that same year; historians noted the unfortunate coincidence with Bastille Day. A journalist commented that a one-month election campaign would not give Muldoon much time to which Muldoon replied, audibly slurring his words, "It doesn't give my opponents much time to run up to an election, does it?". Six days before the election, a televised leader's debate was held between Muldoon and David Lange where Muldoon, irritated by Lange's magnanimous closing words to him, sarcastically finished the debate by saying "I love you, Mr Lange". Muldoon was heavily defeated by Lange's resurgent Labour Party, which won 56 seats to National's 37 with massive vote splitting caused by the New Zealand Party in particular. Muldoon's drunkenness when announcing the election date led to it being humorously called the "schnapps election".

It is a strong convention in New Zealand politics that a prime minister does not ask for an early election unless he or she cannot govern, or unless they need to seek the electorate's endorsement on a matter of national importance (as was the case in 1951). Muldoon justified the snap election because he felt Waring's revolt impeded his ability to govern. Indeed, it was obvious that Muldoon was finding it hard to pass financial measures with neo-liberal rebels like Ruth Richardson and Derek Quigley voting against the Government on certain issues. However, Waring said that she would not have denied Muldoon confidence or supply. This has led historians to question Muldoon's excuse for calling a snap election, since he still would have had the constitutional means to govern.

==== Relationship with foreign leaders ====
Muldoon had several close relationships with foreign leaders, such as British prime minister Margaret Thatcher, American President Ronald Reagan, Philippine dictator Ferdinand Marcos, and Australian prime minister Malcolm Fraser. These ranged from being positive to being stricken with deep animosity.

Despite both being from conservative parties (the Liberal Party of Australia and the New Zealand National Party), the relationship Muldoon had with Malcolm Fraser was unusually poor; largely due to Muldoon, they never got along. This paralleled the mutual dislike previous left-leaning Prime Ministers Gough Whitlam (Australian Labor Party) and Norman Kirk (New Zealand Labour Party) had for each other. Whitlam and Kirk had both become prime minister in 1972 after a lengthy period of conservative rule, but their governments lasted just 3 years, between 1972 and 1975. Both Fraser and Muldoon became prime minister in 1975, returning right-wing governance to Australasia. With their ideological preferences notwithstanding, the two men did not like each other from very early on, and grew to loathe one another to an undiplomatic degree. This was likely entirely caused, and then exacerbated, by Muldoon's animosity toward Fraser. The elder statesman, Muldoon was blatantly patronising and rude to Fraser, and even bullied him on repetitive occasions. He also made bigoted remarks towards Australians in Fraser's company, and was known to repeatedly claim that New Zealanders migrating to Australia "raised the IQ of both countries". Muldoon often boasted to Fraser about the slow and costly process of Australia importing New Zealand goods, claiming on one occasion that New Zealand had "screwed the Aussies again" and would always get the upper hand. Even when negotiating and agreeing to Closer Economic Relations (CER), the most sweeping free trade agreement between Australia and New Zealand ever signed up to that point, Muldoon and Fraser refused to engage directly. Their relationship reached a nadir in 1982, during the Pacific Islands Forum in Rotorua. Both men were staying at the same hotel, with Muldoon's room directly below Fraser's. According to future Australian Minister of Foreign Affairs Alexander Downer, then a political aide, Fraser snapped and physically lost his temper during a late night policy meeting. Downer recalled in 2003 that the usually patient Fraser suddenly began jumping up and down and swearing loudly "in the hope that he would wake Sir Robert from his sleep, just for the sake of it".

Despite Muldoon's tactless behaviour, Fraser harboured gratitude for him out of his belief that Muldoon had saved his life in 1978. According to Fraser himself, this was because Muldoon had inadvertently prevented Fraser from being killed in the 1978 Sydney Hilton Hotel bombing. The hotel was the venue for the first Commonwealth Heads of Government Regional Meeting, a regional offshoot of the biennial meetings of the heads of government from across the Commonwealth of Nations. Fraser recalled that Muldoon had demanded that Fraser change the meeting venue in the hotel from the front to the back, to avoid a group of young, female reproductive rights protestors. They had travelled especially from New Zealand for the event, to demonstrate against Muldoon's refusal to legalise abortion. Fraser, likely considering how Muldoon had physically attacked political demonstrators before, understood that giving him a hostile welcome would be a poor decision. Arguing that it would not look good and could likely provoke New Zealand, he agreed to move the meeting place to the back entrance. Doing so moved Fraser, other leaders and the media away from the original entrance, where that night, a bomb exploded in a bin that was being emptied, killing two rubbish collectors and a policeman. Malcolm Fraser and others theorised that the bomb was planted out the front to assassinate Indian Prime Minister Morarji Desai (although this was never proven) and that if he had walked down to greet Desai as he exited his vehicle at the original entry point, the bomb would likely have been triggered, exploding and killing them both. He later told The Australian in 2009: "I really believe to this day that, in a weird way, Morarji Desai and I probably owe our lives to Robert Muldoon."

Despite Fraser's unwilling gratitude to Muldoon, the two men seemed to dislike each other so much by 1983 that when the time came to ratify CER, they refused to do it together. Instead, the deal was signed by the Deputy Prime Minister of Australia and Minister for Trade, Lionel Bowen and the New Zealand High Commissioner to Australia, Laurie Francis.

==== Foreign exchange and constitutional crises ====
A final controversy occurred during the course of the election and transfer of government: during early 1984 Roderick Deane, then Deputy Governor of the Reserve Bank of New Zealand, became concerned that the New Zealand dollar (which had a fixed exchange-rate to the US dollar) had become significantly overvalued and was vulnerable to currency speculation on the financial markets in the event of a "significant political event". This was exacerbated by media speculation following a leak that an incoming Labour administration would be likely to significantly devalue the NZ dollar upon election. The Reserve Bank counselled Muldoon that the dollar should be devalued. Muldoon ignored the advice, owing to his belief that it would hurt poor New Zealanders in the medium term, and in June 1984 announced the snap election mentioned above which, as predicted, caused an immediate run on the dollar.

Following the election the controversy became a constitutional crisis: Muldoon refused to do as the incoming government instructed, causing the currency crisis to worsen. Eventually he relented however, after his position as leader of the National party was threatened by members of his caucus.

After nine years, Muldoon's stewardship of the nation and its economy ceased. The newly elected neo-liberal and unexpectedly pro-free market Fourth Labour Government embarked on a series of fundamental free-market reforms known (after Labour's finance minister Roger Douglas) as Rogernomics, and which were then continued from 1990 to 1994 by the succeeding National government's policies known as (after National's finance minister Ruth Richardson) as Ruthanasia, which marked a fundamental break with the more interventionist policies of Muldoon's era.

== Later life ==
Muldoon was deposed as National leader shortly after the election by his deputy, Jim McLay. After being defeated in the ballot Muldoon was asked whether he was going to be a thorn in McLay's side, to which he replied "More like a little prick." He refused McLay's offer of a front bench post, instead opting to return to the backbench for the first time in over two decades. However, he continued to openly agitate against McLay, refusing to withdraw into an "elder statesman" role as McLay wanted. The relationship between the two bottomed out when Muldoon criticised the entire party leadership, forcing McLay to demote him to the lowest rank in the National caucus.

Muldoon continued to undermine McLay until 1986, when McLay was ousted in turn by his own deputy (and Muldoon's preferred candidate), Jim Bolger, who had served as Minister of Labour for the latter half of Muldoon's term as prime minister. Bolger returned Muldoon to the front bench as spokesperson for Foreign Affairs, pitting him directly against Prime Minister David Lange.

Muldoon remained as the MP for Tamaki until shortly before his death. He lived through the Fourth Labour Government's neo-liberal reforms, known as "Rogernomics", and to his dismay – to see his own man, Bolger, take up the same baton after winning the landslide election of 1990 in the form of "Ruthanasia", named after Finance Minister Ruth Richardson. Muldoon was a staunch critic of Richardson's and the Bolger government's policies.

Muldoon also opposed the legalisation of homosexual behaviour when Labour MP Fran Wilde introduced the Homosexual Law Reform Bill in 1985. The Bill passed as the Homosexual Law Reform Act in 1986.

Although he remained iconic to particular segments of society, particularly the elderly, Muldoon faded quickly as a force on the political scene. His biographer, Barry Gustafson, who described himself as not a Muldoon supporter, wrote that he still served as an active MP for his Tamaki electorate, dealing immediately with matters from all walks of life. He continued to write in international economic journals, arguing that the unemployment that had arisen as a result of the free market reforms was worse than the gains that were made, a view that came to be popular by the time of the Fifth Labour Government in 1999.

=== Financial troubles, media career, and split from National ===
After his tenure as prime minister, the Muldoons were heavily in debt. Muldoon was furious with New Zealand Party founder Bob Jones for splitting the vote in 1984; Muldoon labelled Jones a spoiler and took him to court. A series of court battles with the millionaire, in which each sued the other for defamation, had left Muldoon with considerable legal fees to pay. As a result of his financial desperation, he capitalised on his abrasive persona by having a short stage career, appearing in a New Zealand production of The Rocky Horror Show. Held at Auckland's His Majesty's Theatre (demolished soon after the production ended), Muldoon played off his novelty and starred as the narrator, starring alongside a young Russell Crowe, then going by the stage name of "Russ Le Roq". He also had minor television appearances on commercials for Panasonic (when it changed its brand name in New Zealand from "National") and in the television series Terry and the Gunrunners (as Arnos Grove) and in The Friday Frights (as the vampiric host 'Count Robula'); he also hosted a talkback radio show entitled Lilies and Other Things, referencing his favourite flower on Radio Pacific.

In his later years Muldoon's health declined as he suffered from a number of ailments, and became increasingly opposed to his successor, Jim Bolger. Alienated from National and disenchanted with government's new neoliberal economic policies (dubbed "Ruthanasia" after Minister of Finance Ruth Richardson), Muldoon announced his resignation to the party caucus on 10 November 1991.

On his Radio Pacific show, on 17 November 1991, Muldoon announced he would stand down from Parliament; he formally retired one month later, on 17 December. His retirement party featured taped speeches from Ronald Reagan (commenting that at Muldoon's age, he was only getting started) and Margaret Thatcher. One of the people organising the party was Bob Jones, who had forgiven Muldoon for their previous falling out. A by-election was held in February 1992, and was won by National's Clem Simich on a reduced majority.

=== Death ===
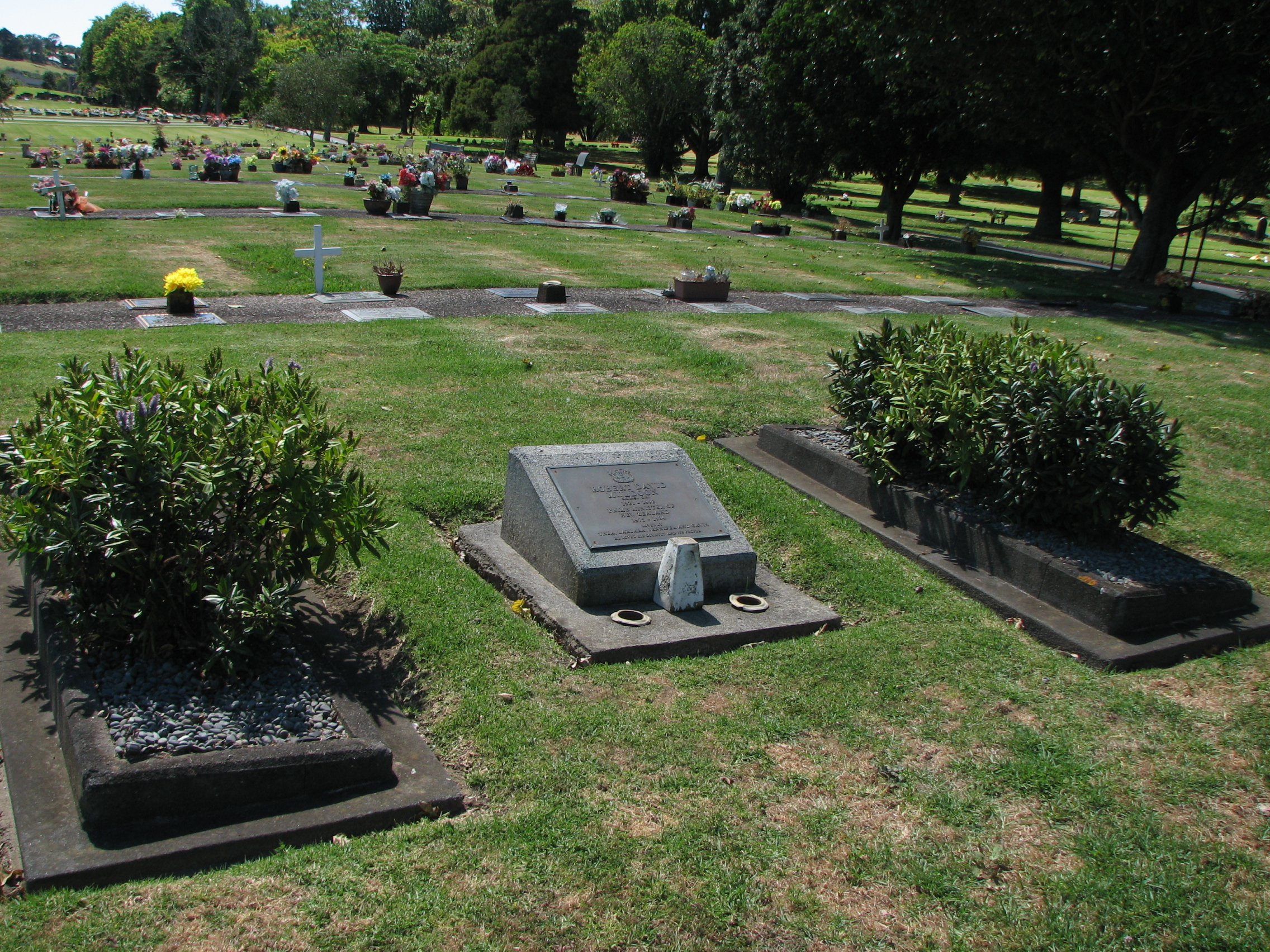
Muldoon's gravestone

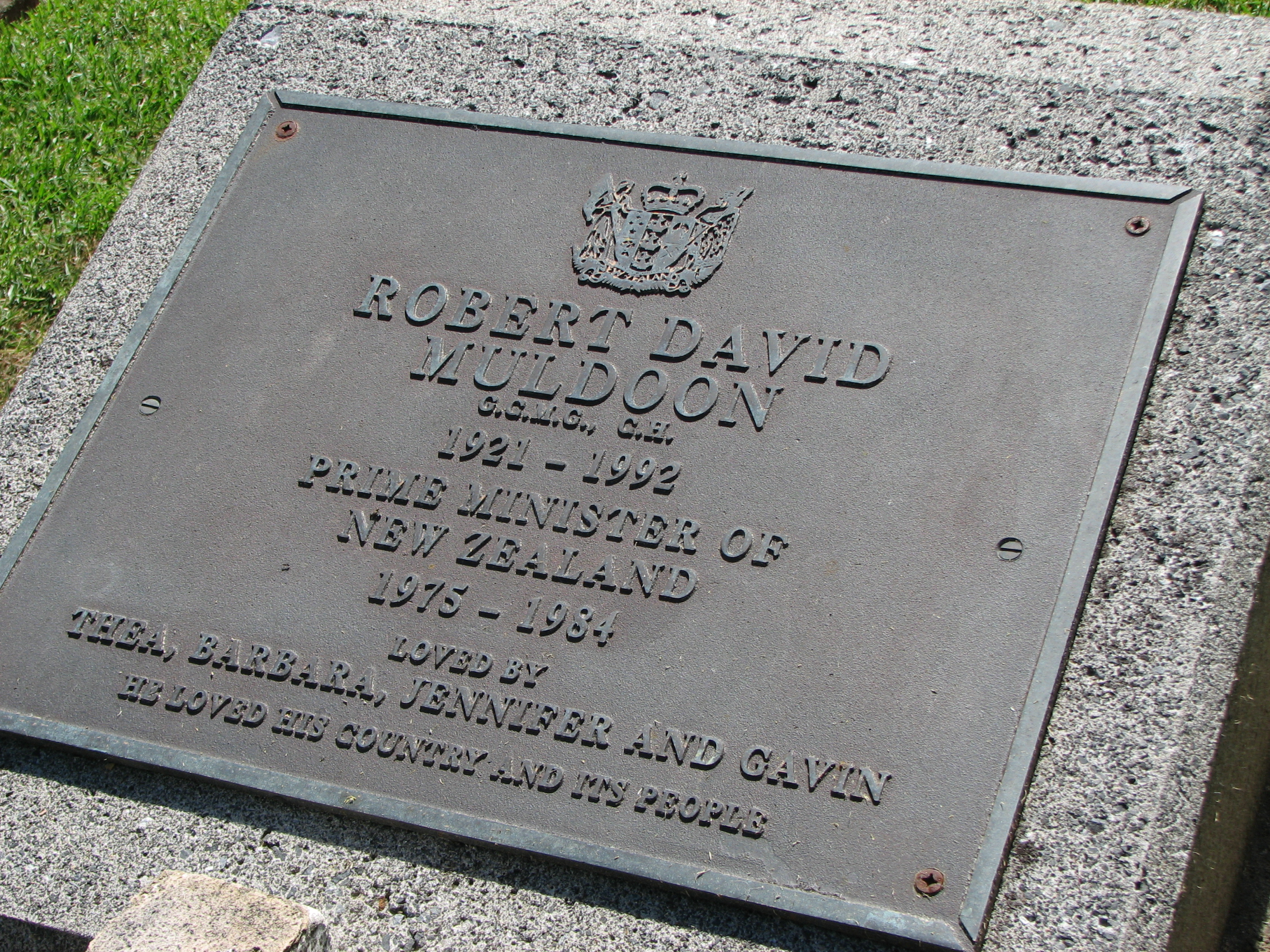
The plaque on the gravestone

Muldoon fell seriously ill almost immediately after his retirement, and died in hospital on 5 August 1992, aged 70. After a state funeral in the Auckland Town Hall on 7 August 1992, he was buried at Purewa Cemetery, Meadowbank, Auckland, in a plot that faces Auckland CBD. His wife, Dame Thea Muldoon, died on 24 February 2015, at the age of 87.

== Honours ==
On 18 March 1981, Muldoon was bestowed with the mātai, or Samoan chiefly title, of Leasapai. He is the first New Zealand Prime Minister to have been awarded this honour.

Muldoon was appointed an Additional Member of the Order of the Companions of Honour in the 1977 Queen's Silver Jubilee and Birthday Honours, and a Knight Grand Cross of the Order of St Michael and St George in the 1984 New Year Honours. He was only the second New Zealand prime minister (after Sir Keith Holyoake) to receive a knighthood while still in office; at the time he said, "If anyone thought it was a signal of an early retirement, it is not."

== Public image and legacy ==
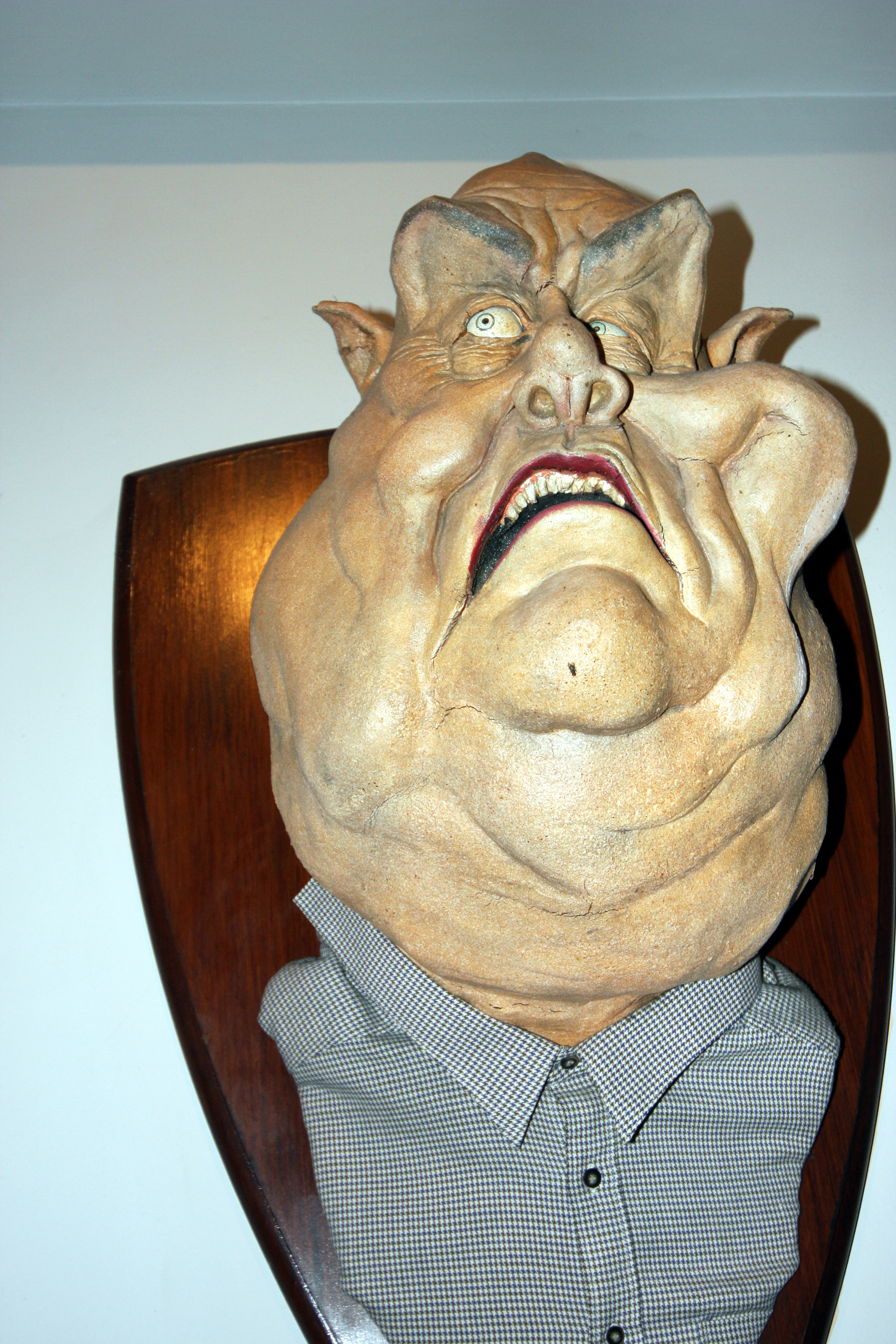
Caricature of Muldoon in Backbenchers bar in Wellington

Muldoon was a polarising figure while in power, and remains one to this day. During his time in power he regularly eschewed formality, even punching political demonstrators. Praised for his populist appeal, he shaped his reputation as a rough, tough, and thoroughly cantankerous politician through his self-determination, even at the risk of his own political longevity. He became the first prime minister to use television as a medium to gain widespread support, and eagerly used it to attack and insult his opponents. Muldoon openly used homophobic language, and he refused to legalise male homosexual activity and abortion, both crimes at the time. However, after the New Zealand Truth attempted to out his youngest MP Marilyn Waring, the 26-year-old Baby of the House, Muldoon moved swiftly to minimise publicity and protect her.

Muldoon declared upon becoming prime minister that he hoped to leave New Zealand "no worse off than I found it". Historians such as Gustafson and Brian Easton criticise Muldoon because, according to them, he pursued an ultimately unsustainable line of policy. Former Cabinet Minister Hugh Templeton argued Muldoon's lack of "strategic vision" denied New Zealand a careful, measured economic restructuring that paved the way for Rogernomics.

Muldoon enjoyed engaging positively with criminal gangs such as Black Power, and made uncouth public statements that emphasised "blokeiness". Both his physical appearance (with his distinctive facial scar) and personal style led to the nicknames "Scarface" and "Piggy" – both of which he appropriated himself. Muldoon became patron of the Black Power gang for whom he had created work schemes and advised on the better treatment of women and children associated with the gang. Members paid him solemn respect by performing a haka during his funeral in 1992. For his acrimonious behaviour he was also dubbed a "bully", and posthumously he was said to have "run the country like a gang" himself.

Muldoon's shunning of intellectualism in favour of intimidating, raging against so-called "elites", and blatant, manipulative populism has led him to be called a forerunner to the likes of Donald Trump, Tucker Carlson and Silvio Berlusconi. Both Muldoon and Trump pursued populist protectionist methods aimed at creating both full employment and self-sufficiency and promoted anti-immigration policies, while demonstrating aggressive and tactless personal behaviour.

=== In popular culture ===
- Muldoon was frequently lampooned in the TVNZ-produced satire show McPhail & Gadsby during the 1980s.
- American President Ronald Reagan would sometimes mistake the last name of Canadian Prime Minister Brian Mulroney to be Muldoon after changes in government in both New Zealand and Canada in 1984, with many Canadian political cartoonists taking up on this error and referring to Mulroney as 'Muldoon'.
- In 1995, actor Ian Mune played Sir Robert Muldoon in the made-for-television mini-series Fallout, depicting the end of the Muldoon National Government.
- A corner on the Remutaka Hill Road section of State Highway 2 has been named after the former prime minister. Safety work carried out between 2009 and 2012, costing NZ$16.5 million, included realignment to ease the corner.
- On 8 January 1977 when he was at Piha Beach for the re-opening of the Piha Surf Life Saving Club club-house after the Project 40 rebuild, he joined the Auckland Rescue Helicopter lifeguards jumping into the surf from the helicopter. He was lifted out of the water and transported back to the beach slung under the helicopter using the rescue strop connected into the cargo hook.
- During Robert Muldoons term there were a few songs that charted that referenced him the first in 1975 was "The Ballad of Robbie Muldoon" by Gray Bartlett and Brendan Dugan which reach number four on the NZ top 50. Another charting single was "Culture" by The Knobz in 1980 it peaked at number five. It was a protest song based on Robert's refusal to remove a 40% tax on locally recorded music. The subsequent year the tax was lifted. In 1981 the song by Blam Blam Blam called "No Depression in NZ" peaked at number 11. The song was a jab at the Muldoon government as well as the Springbok tour of the time.

== See also ==
- Electoral history of Robert Muldoon
- Political history of New Zealand

New Zealand Parliament
| Preceded by Bob Tizard | Member of Parliament for Tamaki; 1960–1991 | Succeeded by Clem Simich |
Political offices
| Preceded by Harry Lake | Minister of Finance; 1967–1972; 1975–1984 | Succeeded by Bill Rowling |
| Preceded by Bob Tizard | Minister of Finance; 1967–1972; 1975–1984 | Succeeded by Roger Douglas |
| Preceded by Jack Marshall | Deputy Prime Minister of New Zealand; 1972 | Succeeded by Hugh Watt |
| Preceded by Jack Marshall | Leader of the Opposition; 1974–1975 | Succeeded by Bill Rowling |
| Preceded by Bill Rowling | Prime Minister of New Zealand; 1975–1984 | Succeeded by David Lange |
| Preceded by David Lange | Leader of the Opposition; 1984 | Succeeded by Jim McLay |
Party political offices
| Preceded by Jack Marshall | Leader of the National Party; 1974–1984 | Succeeded by Jim McLay |
