= Janet Mackey =

New Zealand politician (1953–2024)

Janet Mackey JP

Member of the New Zealand Parliament for Gisborne
- In office 1993–1996
- Preceded by: Wayne Kimber

Member of the New Zealand Parliament for Mahia
- In office 1996–1999

Member of the New Zealand Parliament for East Coast
- In office 1999–2005
- Succeeded by: Anne Tolley

Personal details
- Born: Janet Elsdon Craig; 14 June 1953 Auckland, New Zealand
- Died: 22 July 2024 (aged 71) Gisborne, New Zealand
- Party: Labour
- Relations: Moana Mackey (daughter); Elsdon Best (great-uncle)
- Education: University of Auckland

Janet Elsdon Mackey JP (née Craig; 14 June 1953 – 22 July 2024) was a New Zealand politician. She was a Member of the New Zealand Parliament for the Labour Party from 1993 until 2005.

== Early life and family ==
Mackey was born in Auckland on 14 June 1953, the daughter of Elsdon Walter Grant Craig and Zeta Harriet Craig (née Brown). Her father is a Scottish-New Zealander, and the nephew of Elsdon Best, and her mother is from Northern Ireland. Mackey was educated at Auckland Girls' Grammar School from 1966 to 1969, and went on to study at the University of Auckland, graduating with a Bachelor of Arts in English.

Previously married, Mackey has three children, including Moana Mackey, who has also served as a Labour MP.

== Parliamentary career ==
New Zealand Parliament
Years	Term	Electorate	List	Party
1993–1996	44th	Gisborne		Labour
1996–1999	45th	Mahia	17	Labour
1999–2002	46th	East Coast	28	Labour
2002–2005	47th	East Coast	none	Labour

She was first elected to Parliament in the 1993 election, winning the seat of Gisborne. In the 1996 election, she won the newly created seat of Mahia, and in the 1999 and 2002 elections, she won the seat of East Coast. In 2003, she was joined in Parliament by her daughter, Moana Mackey. Before entering politics, she was a real estate agent.

She announced her intent to retire before the 2005 election, and did not stand for re-election.

== Other activities ==
Mackey served as a trustee of the Trust Bank Eastern and Central Community Trust, and from 1984 to 1990 was chair of the East Coast Regional Employment and Access Council. She was appointed as a justice of the peace in 1988, and became a marriage celebrant in 1989.

== Death ==
She died on 22 July 2024 after a short illness.

New Zealand Parliament
Preceded by Wayne Kimber	Member of Parliament for Gisborne; 1993–1996	Constituency abolished
New constituency	Member of Parliament for Mahia; 1996–1999	Constituency abolished
Vacant Constituency recreated after abolition in 1893 Title last held by William Kelly	Member of Parliament for East Coast; 1999–2005	Succeeded by Anne Tolley
