= Mahia (electorate) =

The Mahia electorate was created in 1996 for the first MMP election. Located on the East Cape, it existed for one term only.

== Population centres ==
The 1996 election was notable for the significant change of electorate boundaries, based on the provisions of the Electoral Act 1993. Because of the introduction of the mixed-member proportional (MMP) electoral system, the number of electorates had to be reduced, leading to significant changes. More than half of the electorates contested in 1996 were newly constituted, and most of the remainder had seen significant boundary changes. In total, 73 electorates were abolished, 29 electorates were newly created (including Mahia), and 10 electorates were recreated, giving a net loss of 34 electorates.

Mahia comprised all of the Gisborne electorate and parts of Eastern Bay of Plenty, Hawkes Bay, Waikaremoana and Wairarapa electorates.

== History ==
Mahia only existed as such for one term and was represented by Labour MP Janet Mackey, who had previously represented Gisborne. For the 1999 election the electorate's boundaries were redrawn as East Coast, which Janet Mackey contested and won in 1999 and in the 2002 election until retiring at the 2005 election.

=== Members of Parliament ===
Key

Labour

Election	Winner
1996 election	Janet Mackey
(Electorate abolished in 1996; see East Coast)

== Election results ==
=== 1996 election ===
1996 general election: Mahia
Notes:	Blue background denotes the winner of the electorate vote. Pink background denotes a candidate elected from their party list. Yellow background denotes an electorate win by a list member, or other incumbent. A ✓ or ✗ denotes status of any incumbent, win or lose respectively.						
Party	Candidate	Votes	%	±%	Party votes	%	±%
Labour	Janet Mackey	10,766	39.11		7,323	26.42	
National	Wayne Kimber	9,788	35.56		9,631	34.75	
NZ First	Gordon Preston	2,910	10.57		4,138	14.93	
ACT	Craig Bauld	1,848	6.71		1,879	6.78	
Alliance	Graham Smith	1,763	6.40		2,787	10.05	
Independent	Luke Donnelly	383	1.39				
Natural Law	Roy Neumegen	69	0.25		26	0.09	
Christian Coalition					1,187	4.28	
Legalise Cannabis					363	1.31	
United NZ					111	0.40	
Animals First					69	0.25	
Progressive Green					66	0.24	
McGillicuddy Serious					42	0.15	
Mana Māori					29	0.10	
Green Society					23	0.08	
Superannuitants & Youth					12	0.04	
Advance New Zealand					10	0.04	
Conservatives					10	0.04	
Libertarianz					5	0.02	
Te Tawharau					4	0.01	
Ethnic Minority Party					2	0.01	
Asia Pacific United					1	0.00	
Informal votes		266			75		
Total valid votes		27,527			27,718		
Labour win new seat	Majority	978	3.55				
