= Electoral history of Robert Muldoon =

List of elections featuring Robert Muldoon as a candidate

This is a summary of the electoral history of Robert Muldoon, Prime Minister of New Zealand (1975–84), Leader of the National Party (1974–84), and Member of Parliament for Tamaki (1960–91).

== Parliamentary elections ==
=== 1954 election ===
1954 general election: Mount Albert
Party	Candidate	Votes	%	±%
Labour	Warren Freer	8,441	57.81	+5.59
National	Robert Muldoon	5,215	35.72	
Social Credit	Walter Crispin	943	6.45	
Majority		3,226	22.09	+17.65
Turnout		14,599	92.22	+1.66
Registered electors		15,830		

=== 1957 election ===
General election, 1957: Waitemata
Party	Candidate	Votes	%	±%
Labour	Norman King	8,771	53.52	+6.99
National	Robert Muldoon	6,580	40.15	
Social Credit	Byrt Jordan	1,036	6.32	−3.09
Majority		2,191	13.37	+10.89
Turnout		16,387	94.83	+3.20
Registered electors		17,280		

=== 1960 election ===
General election, 1960: Tamaki
Party	Candidate	Votes	%	±%
National	Robert Muldoon	8,728	53.58	
Labour	Bob Tizard	7,580	46.54	−4.07
Social Credit	Eric Ernest McGowan	352	2.16	
Communist	Rita Smith	77	0.47	
Majority		1,148	7.04	
Turnout		16,287	89.85	−6.22
Registered electors		18,125		

=== 1963 election ===
General election, 1963: Tamaki
Party	Candidate	Votes	%	±%
National	Robert Muldoon	9,645	59.10	+5.52
Labour	Norman Finch	5,891	36.09	
Social Credit	Joseph F. Richards	382	2.34	
Liberal	Robert Arthur Allen	307	1.88	
Communist	Donald McEwan	94	0.57	
Majority		3,754	23.00	+15.96
Turnout		16,319	92.97	+3.12
Registered electors		17,552		

=== 1966 election ===
General election, 1966: Tamaki
Party	Candidate	Votes	%	±%
National	Robert Muldoon	9,248	55.37	−3.73
Labour	Kevin Ryan	6,421	38.44	
Social Credit	Keith Harold Arthur Branch	1,032	6.17	
Majority		2,827	16.92	−6.08
Turnout		16,701	85.64	−7.33
Registered electors		19,501		

=== 1969 election ===
General election, 1969: Tamaki
Party	Candidate	Votes	%	±%
National	Robert Muldoon	11,513	65.14	+9.77
Labour	Alfred David Bolton	5,425	30.69	
Social Credit	Keith Harold Arthur Branch	496	2.80	−3.37
Independent	Gladys May Thorpy	239	1.35	
Majority		6,088	34.44	+17.52
Turnout		17,673	90.70	+5.06
Registered electors		19,485		

=== 1972 election ===
General election, 1972: Tamaki
Party	Candidate	Votes	%	±%
National	Robert Muldoon	10,146	57.77	−7.37
Labour	Alan Hedger	5,556	31.63	
Values	Graeme Raymond Jessup	876	4.98	
Social Credit	James Robinson	714	4.06	
Socialist Unity	Bill Andersen	108	0.61	
Socialist Party	Ernie Higdon	83	0.47	
Independent National	George Mullenger	48	0.27	
New Democratic	Ian Upton	31	0.17	
Majority		4,590	26.13	−8.31
Turnout		17,562	90.99	−0.29
Registered electors		19,301		

=== 1975 election ===
General election, 1975: Tamaki
Party	Candidate	Votes	%	±%
National	Robert Muldoon	11,836	62.38	+4.61
Labour	Tim Kaye	5,101	26.88	
Values	Brent Impey	1,258	6.63	
Social Credit	David Stevens	725	3.82	
Socialist Unity	Bill Andersen	39	0.20	−0.41
Socialist Party	Ernie Higdon	12	0.06	−0.41
Majority		6,735	35.50	+9.37
Turnout		18,971	84.30	−6.69
Registered electors		22,502		

=== 1978 election ===
General election, 1978: Tamaki
Party	Candidate	Votes	%	±%
National	Robert Muldoon	11,814	56.69	−5.69
Labour	Audie Cooke-Pennefather	5,504	26.41	
Social Credit	Les Tasker	2,360	11.32	
Values	J Woolnough	791	3.79	
Progressive National	D Harden	276	1.32	
Socialist Unity	Bill Andersen	62	0.29	+0.09
Independent	P T P Grace	22	0.10	
United	A H Greig	8	0.03	
Majority		6,310	30.28	−5.22
Turnout		20,837	68.33	−15.97
Registered electors		30,491		

=== 1981 election ===
General election, 1981: Tamaki
Party	Candidate	Votes	%	±%
National	Robert Muldoon	11,543	53.51	−3.18
Labour	Richard Northey	6,390	29.62	
Social Credit	John Stevens	3,449	15.98	
Socialist Unity	Bill Andersen	188	0.87	+0.58
Majority		5,153	23.88	−6.40
Turnout		21,570	88.56	+20.23
Registered electors		24,356		

=== 1984 election ===
General election, 1984: Tamaki
Party	Candidate	Votes	%	±%
National	Robert Muldoon	10,414	46.35	−7.16
Labour	Robin Tulloch	6,656	29.62	
NZ Party	John Hodgson	4,545	20.23	
Social Credit	Eddie Hagen	616	2.74	
Values	Brett Cunningham	93	0.41	
Women's	Sandi Hall	89	0.39	
Independent	D B Butler	51	0.22	
Majority		3,758	16.72	−7.16
Turnout		22,464	91.29	+2.73
Registered electors		24,607		

=== 1987 election ===
General election, 1987: Tamaki
Party	Candidate	Votes	%	±%
National	Robert Muldoon	10,466	52.03	+5.68
Labour	Carl Harding	8,519	42.35	
Democrats	Richard John Pittams	668	3.32	
NZ Party	D T Roberts	343	1.70	
Values	Bruce Symondson	119	0.59	
Majority		1,947	9.67	−7.05
Turnout		20,115	84.79	−6.50
Registered electors		23,721		

=== 1990 election ===
1990 general election: Tamaki
Party	Candidate	Votes	%	±%
National	Robert Muldoon	12,191	58.93	+6.90
Labour	Malcolm Johnston	4,599	22.23	
Green	Richard Green	2,633	12.73	
NewLabour	Bill Logue	789	3.81	
McGillicuddy Serious	Craig Thomas Young	183	0.88	
Democrats	Craig Douglas Thomas	134	0.65	
Social Credit	Charles Thomas Willoughby	67	0.32	
Independent	Matthew Ford Elliot	49	0.23	
Independent	Victor Bryers	44	0.21	
Majority		7,592	36.70	+27.03
Turnout		20,689	85.65	−0.86
Registered electors		24,154		

== Leadership elections ==
=== 1972 leadership election ===
Name	Votes	Percentage
Jack Marshall	26	59.10%
Robert Muldoon	18	40.90%

=== 1984 leadership election ===
Name	Votes	Percentage
Jim McLay	22	62.85%
Jim Bolger	8	22.85%
Robert Muldoon	5	14.28%
