= Trevor Davey =

New Zealand politician

Member of the New Zealand Parliament
- In office 1972–1975
- Constituency: Gisborne

Personal details
- Born: 5 July 1926 Didsbury, Lancashire, England
- Died: 13 February 2012 (aged 85)
- Party: Labour Party
- Spouse: Mavis Birch Baxter (m. 1949)
- Children: 1 son
- Occupation: Politician
- Known for: MP for Gisborne (1972–1975)

Trevor Davey (5 July 1926 – 13 February 2012) was a member of parliament from Gisborne in the North Island of New Zealand who represented the Labour Party.

== Biography ==
New Zealand Parliament
Years	Term	Electorate	Party
1972–1975	37th	Gisborne	Labour

Davey was born in Didsbury, Lancashire, England, in 1926, the son of H. W. Davey. He received his education at Chorlton High School. Davey was a member of the 6th Airborne Division from 1946 to 1948. He married Mavis Birch Baxter in Manchester in 1949, the daughter of H. A. Baxter. They had one son.

He was the managing director of Queen's Hall, Leeds between 1956 and 1966. Davey emigrated to New Zealand with his wife and son in 1966.

Davey served on the Gisborne City Council from 1971 to 1974 where he was a member of the council's works, library, town planning and airport committees. He represented the Gisborne electorate in the New Zealand House of Representatives from 1972, when he beat the incumbent, Esme Tombleson, the first woman who had represented Gisborne in Parliament. At the next election in 1975, he was defeated by National's Bob Bell. He was awarded the New Zealand 1990 Commemoration Medal for service to the community.

Davey was a governor of both Gisborne Boys' and Gisborne Girls' High Schools. He was on the executive of the New Zealand Red Cross (1972–1973).

New Zealand Parliament
Preceded by Esme Tombleson	Member of Parliament for Gisborne; 1972–1975	Succeeded by Bob Bell
