= Wayne Kimber =

New Zealand politician

Wayne Allan Kimber (1949 – 22 May 2004) was a New Zealand politician of the National Party. He was born in Auckland in 1949.

== Professional career ==
Kimber was a town planner by profession and worked for Gisborne City Council. His research led to the establishment of the Greater East Cape Tourism Council, which was renamed to Eastland Tourism Council and then Tourism Eastland.

He went to Waipawa in 1997, where he had an executive role with Central Hawke's Bay District Council, including its acting chief executive. He moved to Taranaki and was Chief Executive of the Stratford District Council from 2001 to 2004.

== Political career ==
New Zealand Parliament
Years	Term	Electorate	Party
1990–1993	43rd	Gisborne	National

Kimber was a Gisborne city councillor from 1986 to 1989. He had a leading role during Cyclone Bola.

He represented the electorate of Gisborne in Parliament from 1990 to 1993, when he was defeated by Janet Mackey. He is one of six one-term National MPs who were elected in a swing against Labour in the 1990 election. He was unsuccessful as a list candidate in the 1996 election, when he was ranked in 59th position. He also contested the new Mahia electorate, in which he was again defeated by Mackey.

== Family and death ==
He married Mandy Shaw in Gisborne in 1985. He died at Waikato Hospital on 22 May 2004 after a short illness, and was survived by his wife, three children and two granddaughters.
