= Gisborne (New Zealand electorate) =

Gisborne is a former New Zealand parliamentary electorate. It existed from 1908 to 1996, and it was represented by 12 Members of Parliament.

== Population centres ==
In the 1907 electoral redistribution, a major change that had to be allowed for was a reduction of the tolerance to ±750 to those electorates where the country quota applied. The North Island had once again a higher population growth than the South Island, and three seats were transferred from south to north. In the resulting boundary distribution, every existing electorate was affected, and three electorates were established for the first time, including the Taumarunui electorate. These changes took effect with the 1908 election.

The city of Gisborne was located within the electorate. In the initial area covered by the electorate, the city was located near the electorate's northern border, and it went as far south as just short of Bay View. Wairoa was thus also located within the initial area.

In the 1911 electoral redistribution, the southern boundary shifted north significantly, and Wairoa was lost to the Hawke's Bay electorate. In the 1918 electoral redistribution, the Gisborne electorate lost large inland areas, but re-gained Wairoa. In the 1922 electoral redistribution, changes to the boundaries were minimal, and in the 1927 electoral redistribution, the electorate was left unaltered.

In the 1937 electoral redistribution, large inland areas were gained and Wairoa lost. The changes in the 1946 electoral redistribution were most significant, with the city of Gisborne now located near the southern boundary of the electorate, and all of the East Cape being gained. The electorate now included the settlements of Te Karaka, Matawai, Tolaga Bay, and Tokomaru Bay.

== History ==
The electorate existed from 1908 to 1996, when it was replaced by the Mahia electorate, which was renamed East Coast from 2002. Its first representative was James Carroll of the Liberal Party, who served for three terms until his defeat in the 1919 election. Douglas Lysnar represented the Gisborne electorate from 1919 to 1931, when he was defeated.

In the 1928 contest Lysnar stood as an independent supporter of the Reform Party and was successful. During 1930, he stopped supporting the Reform Party and became fully independent. At the following election in 1931 he ran as an independent, but was not returned, beaten by Labour's David Coleman.

=== Members of Parliament ===
Key

Liberal Reform Independent Labour National

Election	Winner
1908 election	James Carroll
1911 election	James Carroll
1914 election	James Carroll
1919 election	Douglas Lysnar
1922 election	Douglas Lysnar
1925 election	Douglas Lysnar
1928 election	Douglas Lysnar
1931 election	David Coleman
1935 election	David Coleman
1938 election	David Coleman
1943 election	David Coleman
1946 election	David Coleman
1949 election	Reginald Keeling
1951 election	Harry Dudfield
1954 election	Reginald Keeling (2nd period)
1957 election	Reginald Keeling (2nd period)
1960 election	Esme Tombleson
1963 election	Esme Tombleson
1966 election	Esme Tombleson
1969 election	Esme Tombleson
1972 election	Trevor Davey
1975 election	Bob Bell
1978 election	Bob Bell
1981 election	Bob Bell
1984 election	Allan Wallbank
1987 election	Allan Wallbank
1990 election	Wayne Kimber
1993 election	Janet Mackey
(Electorate abolished in 1996; see Mahia)

== Election results ==
=== 1943 election ===
1943 general election: Gisborne
Party	Candidate	Votes	%	±%
Labour	David Coleman	6,677	55.06	−8.93
National	Harry Barker	4,756	39.22	
Democratic Labour	Trevor Lyon	572	4.71	
Informal votes		121	0.99	+0.44
Majority		572	4.71	−23.84
Turnout		12,126	93.77	+1.39
Registered electors		12,931		

=== 1938 election ===
1938 general election: Gisborne
Party	Candidate	Votes	%	±%
Labour	David Coleman	8,158	63.99	+5.44
National	Kenneth Francis Jones	4,518	35.44	
Informal votes		71	0.55	−0.19
Majority		3,640	28.55	+11.44
Turnout		12,747	92.38	+4.13
Registered electors		13,797		

=== 1935 election ===
1935 general election: Gisborne
Party	Candidate	Votes	%	±%
Labour	David Coleman	6,230	58.55	+13.61
Independent	Douglas Lysnar	4,409	41.44	−0.34
Informal votes		79	0.74	+0.45
Majority		1,821	17.11	+13.50
Turnout		10,639	88.25	+4.83
Registered electors		12,055		

=== 1931 election ===
1931 general election: Gisborne
Party	Candidate	Votes	%	±%
Labour	David Coleman	4,436	44.94	
Independent	Douglas Lysnar	4,124	41.78	
Reform	Harry de Lautour	1,311	13.28	
Informal votes		29	0.29	
Majority		312	3.16	
Turnout		9,900	83.42	
Registered electors		11,867		

=== 1928 election ===
1928 general election: Gisborne
Party	Candidate	Votes	%	±%
Independent	Douglas Lysnar	3,746	38.30	
Labour	David Coleman	3,400	34.76	
United	William Lissant Clayton	2,635	26.94	
Majority		346	3.54	
Informal votes		68	0.69	
Turnout		9,849	87.07	
Registered electors		11,311		

=== 1922 election ===
1922 general election: Gisborne
Party	Candidate	Votes	%	±%
Reform	Douglas Lysnar	3,465	38.71	+0.80
Liberal	George Wildish	2,965	33.12	
Labour	Tom Brindle	2,521	28.16	−0.66
Majority		500	5.59	+0.94
Turnout		8,951	80.61	+10.95
Registered electors		11,104		

=== 1919 election ===
1919 general election: Gisborne
Party	Candidate	Votes	%	±%
Reform	Douglas Lysnar	3,041	37.91	
Liberal	James Carroll	2,668	33.26	
Labour	Tom Brindle	2,312	28.82	
Informal votes		114	1.40	
Majority		373	4.65	
Turnout		8,135	69.66	
Registered electors		11,678		
