= 44th New Zealand Parliament =

Term of the Parliament of New Zealand

44th Parliament of New Zealand
←	43rd Parliament	45th Parliament	→
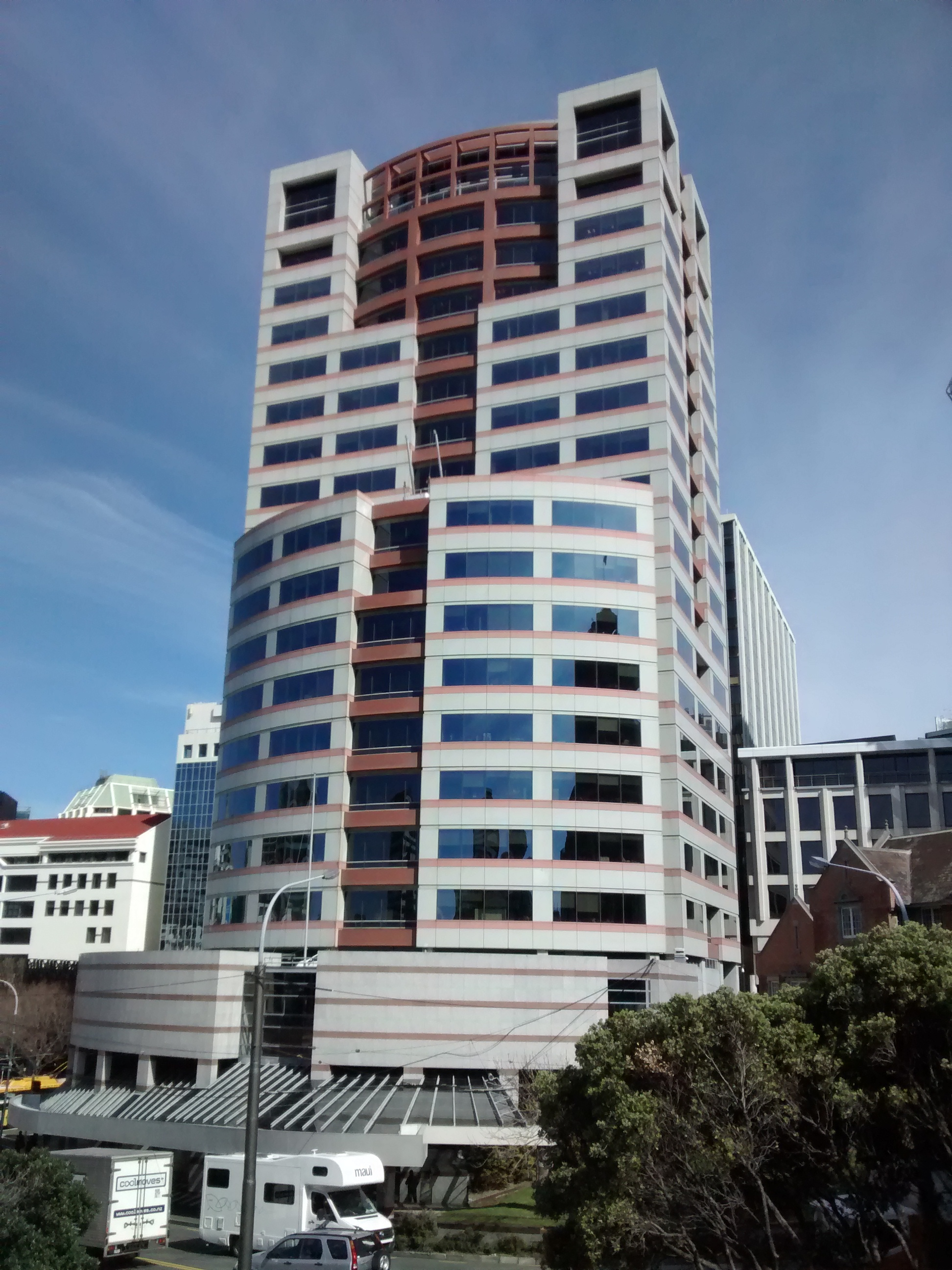
- Bowen House, Wellington

Overview
- Legislative body: New Zealand Parliament
- Term: 21 December 1993 – 27 August 1996
- Election: 1993 New Zealand general election
- Government: Fourth National Government

House of Representatives
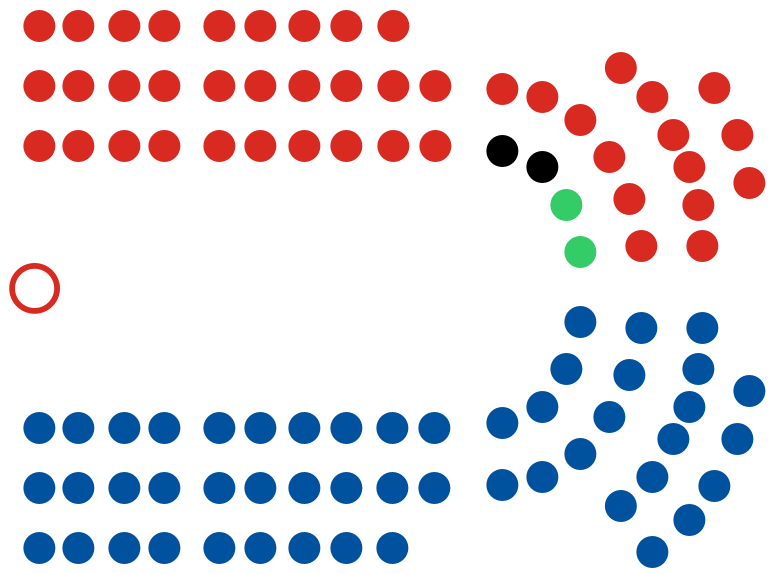
- Members: 99
- Speaker of the House: Peter Tapsell
- Leader of the House: Don McKinnon
- Prime Minister: Jim Bolger
- Leader of the Opposition: Helen Clark

Sovereign
- Monarch: Elizabeth II
- Governor-General: Michael Hardie Boys — Dame Catherine Tizard until 21 March 1996

The 44th New Zealand Parliament was a term of the Parliament of New Zealand. Its composition was determined by the 1993 elections, and it sat until the 1996 elections.

The 44th Parliament was the last to be elected under the old FPP electoral system, with voters approving a change to MMP at the same time as they voted in the 1993 elections. As such, the 44th Parliament saw a considerable amount of positioning for the change — at the beginning of the term, there were four parties in Parliament, but at the end, there were seven parties and one independent. The National Party, which had begun the term with a majority, was forced by the end of the term to form a coalition with several smaller parties to remain in power. Despite the various maneuverings, however, the National Party remained in government for the duration of the 44th Parliament, which comprised National's second term in office. The other three parties present at the start of the 44th Parliament, being the Labour Party, the Alliance, and New Zealand First, all remained in opposition.

The 44th Parliament consisted of ninety-nine representatives, two more than the previous Parliament. All of these representatives were chosen by single-member geographical electorates, including four special Māori electorates.

From 1991 to 1996—including the entirety of the 44th term of Parliament—MPs met in a debating chamber in Bowen House while Parliament House was being refurbished.

== Electoral boundaries for the 44th Parliament ==
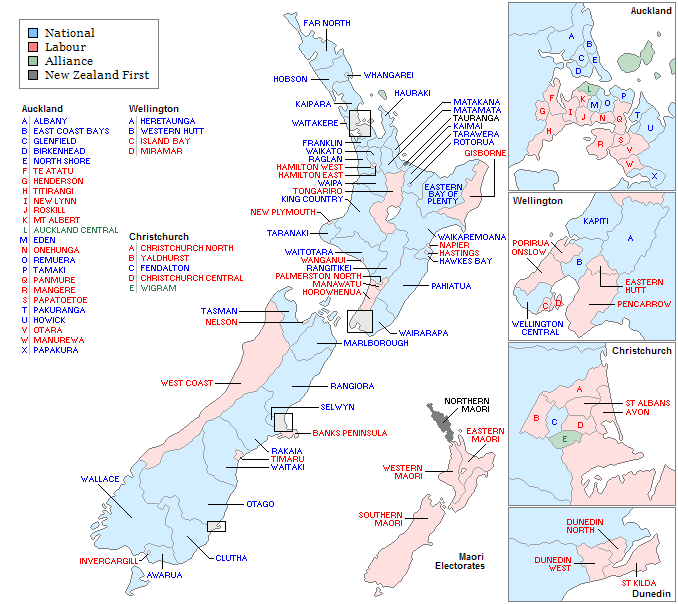

== Overview of seats ==
The table below shows the number of MPs in each party following the 1993 election and at dissolution:

Affiliation	Members	
Affiliation	At 1993 election	At dissolution
National	50	41
United NZ	–	7
Conservatives	–	1
Christian Democrats	–	1
Independent	–	1
Government total	50	51
Labour	45	41
NZ First	2	5
Alliance	2	2
Opposition total	49	48
Total	99	99
Working Government majority	1	3

Notes

- The Working Government majority is calculated as all Government MPs less all other parties.

== Initial composition of the 44th Parliament ==
The table below shows the results of the 1993 general election by electorate:

Key

National Labour Alliance NZ First Independent

Electorate results for the 1993 New Zealand general election
Electorate	Incumbent	Winner	Majority	Runner up
General electorates
Albany	Don McKinnon		3,651	Jill Jeffs
Auckland Central	Richard Prebble	Sandra Lee	1,291	Richard Prebble
Avon	Larry Sutherland		5,643	Marie Venning
Awarua	Jeff Grant	Eric Roy	2,236	Olivia Scaletti-Longley
Birkenhead	Ian Revell		104	Ann Hartley
Christchurch Central	Lianne Dalziel		6,189	Andrew Rowe
Christchurch North	Mike Moore		6,024	Lee Morgan
Clutha	Robin Gray		4,117	Jeff Buchanan
Dunedin North	Pete Hodgson		3,794	Hugh Perkins
Dunedin West	Clive Matthewson		4,477	Ollie Turner
East Coast Bays	Murray McCully		4,516	Heather-Anne McConachy
Eastern Bay of Plenty	New electorate	Tony Ryall	806	Diane Collins
Eastern Hutt	Paul Swain		4,718	Peter MacMillan
Eden	Christine Fletcher		3,394	Verna Smith
Far North	New electorate	John Carter	3,425	Maryanne Baker
Fendalton	Philip Burdon		4,982	Tony Day
Franklin	New electorate	Bill Birch	3,543	Judy Bischoff
Gisborne	Wayne Kimber	Janet Mackey	1,068	Wayne Kimber
Glenfield	Peter Hilt		1,983	Ann Batten
Hamilton East	Tony Steel	Dianne Yates	80	Tony Steel
Hamilton West	Grant Thomas	Martin Gallagher	449	Grant Thomas
Hastings	Jeff Whittaker	Rick Barker	2,571	Cynthia Bowers
Hauraki	New electorate	Warren Kyd	1,870	Jeanette Fitzsimons
Hawkes Bay	Michael Laws		3,143	Peter Reynolds
Henderson	New electorate	Jack Elder	2,130	David Jorgensen
Heretaunga	Peter McCardle		832	Heather Simpson
Hobson	Ross Meurant		2,697	Frank Grover
Horowhenua	Hamish Hancock	Judy Keall	2,347	Hamish Hancock
Howick	New electorate	Trevor Rogers	5,754	James Clarke
Invercargill	Rob Munro	Mark Peck	1,174	Rob Munro
Island Bay	Elizabeth Tennet		5,422	Chris Shields
Kaimai	Robert Anderson		372	Peter Brown
Kaipara	Lockwood Smith		2,958	Rosalie Steward
Kapiti	Roger Sowry		1,038	Rob Calder
King Country	Jim Bolger		4,506	Murray Simpson
Lyttelton	Gail McIntosh	Ruth Dyson	677	David Carter
Manawatu	Hamish MacIntyre (Note: Hamish MacIntyre left National in 1992, joining the Liberal Party which became part of the Alliance)	Jill White	164	Gray Baldwin
Māngere	David Lange		5,958	Len Richards
Manurewa	George Hawkins		4,014	Mark Chalmers
Marlborough	Doug Kidd		2,548	Ron Howard
Matakana	New electorate	Graeme Lee	893	John Neill
Matamata	John Luxton		5,977	John Pemberton
Miramar	Graeme Reeves	Annette King	2,595	Graeme Reeves
Mount Albert	Helen Clark		4,656	Vanessa Brown
Napier	Geoff Braybrooke		4,926	Colleen Pritchard
Nelson	John Blincoe		2,007	Margaret Emerre
New Lynn	Jonathan Hunt		1,598	Cliff Robinson
New Plymouth	John Armstrong	Harry Duynhoven	3,126	John Armstrong
North Shore	Bruce Cliffe		4,723	Joel Cayford
Onehunga	Grahame Thorne	Richard Northey	407	Grahame Thorne
Onslow	New electorate	Peter Dunne	1,065	George Mathew
Otago	Warren Cooper		3,220	Janet Yiakmis
Otara	Trevor Rogers	Taito Phillip Field	5,981	Shane Frith
Pahiatua	John Falloon		5,178	Margo Martindale
Pakuranga	Maurice Williamson		5,460	Heather MacKay
Palmerston North	Steve Maharey		3,764	Barbara Stones
Panmure	Judith Tizard		3,277	Bruce Jesson
Papakura	John Robertson		484	Nancy Hawks
Papatoetoe	Ross Robertson		5,977	Jim Wild
Pencarrow	Sonja Davies	Trevor Mallard	2,641	Rosemarie Thomas
Porirua	Graham Kelly		6,713	Lagi Sipeli
Raglan	Simon Upton		4,540	Bill Harris
Rakaia	New electorate	Jenny Shipley	4,540	John Howie
Rangiora	Jim Gerard		4,469	Maureen Little
Rangitīkei	Denis Marshall		3,422	Bob Peck
Remuera	Doug Graham		8,619	Mary Tierney
Roskill	Gilbert Myles (Note: Gilbert Myles left National in 1991, becoming Independent, then joining the Liberal Party, which became part of the Alliance, finally New Zealand First in 1992–93)	Phil Goff	2,205	Allan Spence
Rotorua	Paul East		429	Keith Ridings
Selwyn	Ruth Richardson		888	Ron Mark
St Albans	David Caygill		3,425	Raewyn Dawson
St Kilda	Michael Cullen		5,071	Leah McBey
Sydenham	Jim Anderton		7,476	Greg Coyle
Tāmaki	Clem Simich		7,951	Richard Green
Taranaki	Roger Maxwell		4,871	Stephen Wood
Tarawera	Max Bradford		4,155	Gordon Dickson
Tasman	Nick Smith		4,059	Geoff Rowling
Tauranga	Winston Peters (Note: Winston Peters had been an independent since the 1993 by-election.)	Winston Peters	7,924	John Cronin
Te Atatū	Brian Neeson	Chris Carter	1,388	Laila Harré
Timaru	Maurice McTigue	Jim Sutton	2,940	Maurice McTigue
Titirangi	Marie Hasler	Suzanne Sinclair	340	Marie Hasler
Tongariro	Ian Peters	Mark Burton	1,951	Ian Peters
Waikaremoana	Roger McClay		4,021	Gregg Sheehan
Waikato	Rob Storey		2,286	Susan Moore
Waipa	Katherine O'Regan		3,730	John Kilbride
Wairarapa	Wyatt Creech		2,229	Peter Teahan
Waitakere	New electorate	Brian Neeson	3,180	Barbara Hutchinson
Waitaki	Alec Neill		53	Bruce Albiston (Note: Albiston was first on election night for Waitaki, but lost when special votes were included)
Waitotara	Peter Gresham		4,545	Kelvin Lehmstedt
Wallace	Bill English		5,578	Lesley Soper
Wanganui	Cam Campion (Note: Campion became an independent on 3 March 1993)	Jill Pettis	3,371	Gael Donoghue
Wellington-Karori	New electorate	Pauline Gardiner	480	Chris Laidlaw
West Coast	Margaret Moir	Damien O'Connor	2,920	Margaret Moir
Western Hutt	Joy Quigley		1,542	Vern Walsh
Whangarei	John Banks		1,587	Mark Furey
Yaldhurst	Margaret Austin		2,997	David Watson
Māori electorates
Eastern Maori	Peter Tapsell		6,666	Alamein Kopu
Northern Maori	Bruce Gregory	Tau Henare	416	Bruce Gregory
Southern Maori	Whetu Tirikatene-Sullivan		6,340	Jules Parkinson
Western Maori	Koro Wētere		3,777	Ricky Taiaroa

Table footnotes:

== Changes during 44th Parliament ==
=== By-elections ===
There was one by-election held during the term of the 44th Parliament.

By-elections during 44th Parliament
Electorate and by-election		Date	Incumbent	Cause	Winner
Selwyn	1994	13 August	Ruth Richardson	Resignation	David Carter

- Ruth Richardson, the National Party MP for Selwyn, quit Parliament in August 1994, having been replaced as Minister of Finance the previous year. Her departure prompted a by-election in Selwyn, which was won by David Carter of the National Party.
- Michael Laws, the New Zealand First (originally National) MP for Hawkes Bay, resigned from Parliament after the so-called "Antoinette Beck" controversy. Rather than hold a by-election, the Prime Minister simply brought the 1996 general election forward slightly, as the rules allowed that if a general election is approaching, a vacant seat need not be filled immediately.

=== Party affiliation changes ===
Name	Year	Seat	From	To
Peter Dunne	1994	Onslow	Labour	Independent
Peter Dunne	1994	Onslow	Independent	Future New Zealand
Peter Dunne	1995	Onslow	Future	United NZ
Ross Meurant	1994	Hobson	National	Independent
Ross Meurant	1996	Hobson	Independent	Right of Centre/Conservatives
Graeme Lee	1994	Matakana	National	Christian Democrat Party
Trevor Rogers	1995	Matakana	National	Right of Centre/Conservatives
Margaret Austin	1995	Yaldhurst	Labour	United NZ
Bruce Cliffe	1995	North Shore	National	United NZ
Clive Matthewson	1995	Dunedin West	Labour	United NZ
Pauline Gardiner	1995	Wellington-Karori	National	United NZ
Peter Hilt	1995	Glenfield	National	United NZ
John Robertson	1995	Papakura	National	United NZ
Jack Elder	1996	Henderson	Labour	New Zealand First
Peter McCardle	1996	Heretaunga	National	New Zealand First
Michael Laws	1996	Hawke's Bay	National	New Zealand First

- Peter Dunne, the Labour Party MP for Onslow, left his party in October 1994, believing that Labour was becoming increasingly left-wing. He was an independent for a time before founding the small Future New Zealand party. He would later join with United (see below).
- Ross Meurant, the National Party MP for Hobson, left his party in September 1994, having clashed on a number of issues with the party's leadership. He eventually established the Right of Centre party.
- Graeme Lee, the National Party MP for Matakana, left his party in 1994, partly due to policy disputes with its leadership and partly due to having lost his Cabinet post in a reshuffle. He founded a new party which eventually became the Christian Democrat Party.
- Trevor Rogers, the National Party MP for Howick, left his party in June 1995, after disputes regarding policy issues with the party's leadership. He joined Ross Meurant's new party.
- A group of centrist MPs from both the National Party and the Labour Party, along with Peter Dunne and his Future New Zealand party, established a centrist party named United New Zealand in June 1995. The MPs who founded United were Margaret Austin, Bruce Cliffe, Peter Dunne, Clive Matthewson, Pauline Gardiner, Peter Hilt, and John Robertson.
- Ross Meurant, founder of Right of Centre, came into conflict with his own party (now renamed the Conservatives) in February 1996, and left the party to become an independent again. Trevor Rogers, the sole remaining MP, became leader.
- Jack Elder, the Labour Party MP for Henderson, Peter McCardle, the National Party MP for Heretaunga, and Michael Laws, the National Party MP for Hawke's Bay, all left their parties to join New Zealand First in April 1996.

=== Summary of changes during term ===
The number of party affiliation changes necessitated changes in government within the term of Parliament.

Governmental arrangements during the 44th Parliament
Period	Government (coalition)		Confidence and supply		
1993–1994	National				
1994	National	Right of Centre			
1994–1995	National	Right of Centre	Future New Zealand		
1995	National	Right of Centre	United NZ	Christian Democrat	
1995–1996	National	United NZ	Christian Democrat	Conservative	Independent

== Seating plan ==
=== Start of term ===
The chamber is in a horseshoe-shape.

Hawkins	Braybrooke
Tennet	Mallard
Matthewson	Lange
Tapsell
Kidd	Shipley
Marshall	Banks
Gerard	Gresham

Blincoe	R. Robertson
Sutherland	Hunt
Caygill	Clark
McKinnon	BOLGER
Sowry	Carter
Cliffe	Gray

Tizard	Northey
Austin	Sutton
Cullen	Wētere
Birch	East
Creech	Graham
Maxwell	McClay

Duynhoven	Keall
Maharey	Kelly
Goff	King
Burdon	Upton
Luxton	Cooper
O'Regan	Kyd

Moore
Tirikatene-Sullivan	Elder
Dunne	Dalziel
L. Smith	Falloon
Williamson	McCully
Meurant

Field	Gallagher	Mackey	Sinclair	White
Hodgson	Swain	Barker	Burton	O'Connor	Yates
Peters	Henare	Lee	C. Carter	Peck
Anderton	Dyson	Pettis
Storey	Laws	Rogers	Roy
English	Quigley	Richardson	Hilt	J. Robertson	Gardiner
Lee	Anderson	Bradford	Fletcher	Revell	N. Smith
McCardle	Neeson	Neill	Ryall	Simich
