= 1977 Mangere by-election =

New Zealand by-election

← 1975 general	26 March 1977	1978 general →
- Turnout: 16,758 (64.31%)
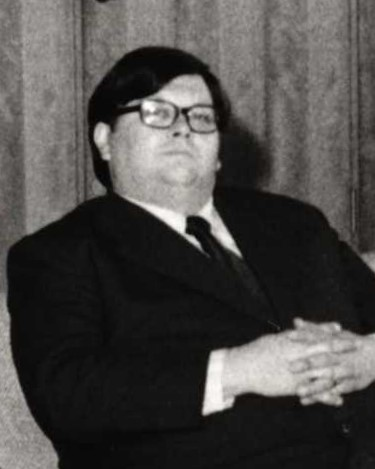

Candidate	David Lange	Clem Simich
Party	Labour	National
Popular vote	9,766	5,107
Percentage	58.27	30.48
MP before election
Colin Moyle
Labour
Elected MP
David Lange
Labour

The Mangere by-election of 1977 was a by-election for the electorate of Mangere on 26 March 1977 during the 38th New Zealand Parliament. The by-election resulted from the resignation of the previous member Colin Moyle after accusations against him in parliament, and he was replaced by David Lange, also of the Labour Party. Apart from Lange, there were seven other candidates in the by-election.

== Candidates ==
=== Labour ===
Initially, there was media supposition that Moyle would stand again to vindicate himself from Muldoon's allegations and that he would not be opposed for selection. However several people did nominate though they were without name recognition. As Mangere was a safe Labour seat, there was a large amount of interest. Eventually there were four former Labour MPs in the race and Moyle decided to withdraw his nomination on 12 February only three days before the selection meeting. This led Labour's Auckland President Barry Gustafson to call for nominations to be re-opened, however Labour Party general secretary John Wybrow refused. With Moyle out, former MPs Dorothy Jelicich and Mike Moore became the favourites, with both Moyle and Labour leader Bill Rowling supporting Jelicich.

In the end a mammoth total of 16 candidates were nominated:

- Gerrard Beeson, former Mayor of Onehunga
- Brian Edwards, a Manukau City Councillor
- Kelly Flavell, local lawyer
- Ken Hastings, Secretary of Labour's Auckland Regional Council
- George Hawkins, Chairman of the Papakura branch
- Harriet Hussey, Secretary of the Grey Lynn branch
- Dorothy Jelicich, former MP for Hamilton West
- David Lange, who was Labour's candidate for Hobson in 1975
- Nigel Mercer, Chairman of the Papatoetoe branch
- Mike Moore, former MP for Eden
- Brian Nicholson, member of the Manukau East branch
- Ian Shaw, Secretary of the Riverside branch
- Elsa Smith, Chair of the Grey Lynn women's branch
- Rex Stanton, a Takapuna City Councillor and Labour's candidate for East Coast Bays in 1975
- Charles Turner, Chairman of the Howick branch
- Ron Ng-Waishing, a former member of the Labour Party executive and candidate for Franklin in 1975

In addition to Moyle, several candidates pulled out of the nomination process; Malcolm Douglas unsuccessful Labour nominee for Onehunga in 1975, Geoff Braybrooke Labour's candidate for Pakuranga in 1975 and Murray Smith former MP for Whangarei.

The candidates were narrowed down to a shortlist three Jelicich, Lange and Moore. The local members preferred Moore whilst the Labour Party head office favoured Jelicich resulting in Lange being selected as a compromise candidate. Lange, a criminal defence lawyer, was relatively unknown in political circles and his selection was something of a surprise. He was an unsuccessful candidate on the Labour ticket for the Auckland City Council at the 1974 local elections and had stood for parliament in Hobson in 1975, placing third.

=== National ===
Four candidates sought the National Party nomination:

- Colin Bidois, a sports shop proprietor and Manukau City Councillor since 1968
- Stanley Lawson, a book retail manager and member of the Auckland Power Board, National's Mangere candidate in 1972 and 1975
- Clem Simich, a builder and former police detective-sergeant, deputy chairman of National's Tamaki executive
- Brian Slater, a pilot and Waitemata City Councillor, former vice-chair of National's Waitakere executive (1964–1967)

Simich won the selection. Simich was noted as being well presented but misjudging the nature of the Mangere electorate. His policies were largely conservative and he drove around in a Rolls-Royce followed by several other glamorous cars in a motorcade which jarred with the lower-middle class nature of the locals.

=== Others ===
The incipient Values Party chose their 1975 candidate Frank Grayson once again. Barry Moss, an unsuccessful candidate for Manukau in 1969 stood as a "Worker's Labour" candidate. Bill Owens was the candidate for the Social Credit Party who had contested the Mangere seat in 1975. Barry Shaw ran as an independent labour candidate and Brigid Mulrennan stood for the Socialist Action Party, both had contested Auckland Central in 1975.

== Campaign ==
Most of the campaigning was conducted by candidates hosting public meetings, most of which were well attended. Labour leader Bill Rowling spoke at several meetings in Lange's support as did several other MPs. In one noted occasion a heckler at a workplace meeting was chased across a nearby paddock by Wigram MP Mick Connelly. There was also a live televised debate between Lange and Simich which, despite being a local contest, was broadcast nationwide. Lange performed well and won the debate, giving him much publicity on the national stage.

== Results ==
The following table gives the election results:

1977 Mangere by-election
Party	Candidate	Votes	%	±%
Labour	David Lange	9,766	58.27	
National	Clem Simich	5,107	30.48	
Social Credit	Bill Owens	1,026	6.10	−0.07
Values	Frank Grayson	789	4.71	−1.02
Worker's Labour	Barry Moss	28	0.17	
Alpha	Paul Magoffin	18	0.11	
Independent Labour	Barry Shaw	17	0.10	
Socialist Action	Brigid Mulrennan	7	0.04	
Majority		4,659	27.80	
Turnout		16,758	64.31	−15.35
Registered electors		26,058		
Labour hold		Swing		

== Aftermath ==
The by-election put Lange into parliament, and the attention that he got helped propel him to the deputy leadership of the parliamentary Labour Party in 1979 and the leadership itself in February 1983, and then a landslide victory over Muldoon in the 1984 general election. As Labour's majority was larger than expected Lange spent most of his first few weeks as an MP supporting Labour's candidate in the 1977 Pahiatua by-election, Allan Levett, attempt to increase their vote share. Moyle stood as Labour's candidate in Whangarei in 1978 and would re-enter parliament in 1981 as MP for Hunua.
