= Howick (electorate) =

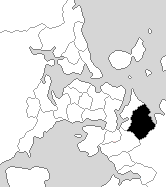
Howick electorate boundaries between 1993 and 1996

Howick is a former New Zealand parliamentary electorate, which existed for one parliamentary term from 1993 to 1996, and was held by Trevor Rogers. In 1995, Rogers defected from National to the Right of Centre party.

== Population centres ==
Based on the 1991 New Zealand census, an electoral redistribution was carried out. This resulted in the abolition of nine electorates, and the creation of eleven new electorates. Through an amendment in the Electoral Act in 1965, the number of electorates in the South Island was fixed at 25, so the new electorates increased the number of the North Island electorates by two. In the South Island, one electorate was abolished and one electorate was recreated. In the North Island, five electorates were newly created (including Howick), five electorates were recreated, and eight electorates were abolished.

This suburban electorate was in the southern part of greater Auckland.

== History ==
The electorate was established in the 1993 election, and included the eastern part of the previous Otara electorate. The Otara electorate was usually won by Labour, but in the 1990 election when Labour lost a number of electorates, Trevor Rogers of National beat Taito Phillip Field the new Labour candidate for Otara to replace Colin Moyle (who was retiring). In the 1993 election, Trevor Rogers moved east to the new Howick electorate, which covered higher-income suburbs traditionally National. In 1995, Rogers defected to the Right of Centre party.

The Howick electorate was abolished in the 1996 election, the first mixed-member (MMP) election, when it was absorbed into the Manukau East electorate.

=== Members of Parliament ===
Key

National

Election	Winner
1993 election	Trevor Rogers
(Electorate abolished in 1996; see Manukau East)

== Election results ==
=== 1993 election ===
1993 general election: Howick
Party	Candidate	Votes	%	±%
National	Trevor Rogers	10,676	47.81	
Labour	James Clarke	4,922	22.04	
Alliance	Warwick Hoyte	3,747	16.78	
NZ First	Ron Chamberlain	2,590	11.60	
McGillicuddy Serious	Erik Landhuis	261	1.17	
Natural Law	Gaynor Hamill	134	0.60	
Majority		5,754	25.77	
Informal votes		494	2.16	
Turnout		22,824	86.83	
Registered electors		26,286		
