= New Zealand Pacific Party =

- Leader: Taito Philip Field
- Founded: 2008
- Dissolved: 2010
- Colours: Purple

The New Zealand Pacific Party was a Christian political party that existed in New Zealand from 2008 to 2010. The party was founded as a vehicle for former Labour MP Taito Phillip Field, who was subsequently convicted for bribery and corruption. It aimed to represent Pacific Island communities within New Zealand, and support Christian and "family values" and social justice.

== Formation ==
Field became an MP in 1993 for the Labour party, originally for the Otara electorate then, when that seat was abolished in 1996, for Māngere. In February 2007 he was expelled from Labour, staying in parliament as an independent. In April 2007 Field told The Sunday Star-Times he would form a new political party based on family values. Mr Field cited opposition to Sue Bradford's Bill to remove the defence for child discipline as an example of a "groundswell of Christian people" and stated "There is a vacuum, there is room for a political party... people are looking for a new vehicle." Mr Field also had meetings with Richard Lewis, leader of Destiny Church political party Destiny New Zealand, over a possible alliance. The party was registered on 24 April 2008, and officially launched on 16 August 2008. It claimed to have over 3000 members in August 2008.

== 2008 election and deregistration ==
The Pacific Party lost its single constituency seat in New Zealand's Parliament in the 2008 general election. Taito Philip Field lost his Māngere electorate seat to Labour's William Sio; Field got 5,525 votes compared to Sio's 12,651. In the party vote, the Pacific Party attracted 8,640 votes, or 0.37%. With under 5% of the party vote and no electorate seats, the Pacific Party did not meet the threshold to enter Parliament.

After the election, nothing further was heard from the Pacific Party for almost two years. On 2 September 2010 the party was deregistered.
