= Trevor Rogers (politician) =

New Zealand politician (born 1943)

Trevor Vicemar Rogers (born 18 August 1943 in Auckland) is a former New Zealand member of parliament, sitting for the National Party from 1990 to 1995, then for the Right of Centre party from 1995 to 1996.

== Member of Parliament ==
New Zealand Parliament
Years	Term	Electorate	Party
1990–1993	43rd	Otara	National
1993–1995	44th	Howick	National
1995–1996	Changed allegiance to:		Conservatives

Rogers was first a member of parliament for the National Party, having previously been on several Auckland local bodies; an Auckland City Councillor 1977–1989, a member of the Auckland Regional Authority 1983–1986, and on the No 2 District Roads Council 1983–1987. In 1986, he put himself forward for the National Party nomination in the Auckland electorate of Eden. Up against three other nominees (David Phillips, Jock Parbhu and Hiwi Tauroa) he was unsuccessful.

In the 1990 election he took the Otara seat beating Taito Phillip Field, who had replaced the retiring MP Colin Moyle as the Labour candidate for the seat. He had previously stood for the Otara seat in 1987. In the 1993 election he won the new Howick seat, which comprised the eastern part of the old Otara seat.

He gained considerable public recognition for his crusade against pornography and for the open access to children studying on home computers. He wanted programs such as "Net Nanny" to be available and even compulsory in the home. Open access on the internet he saw as facilitating the distribution of pornography to minors. In 1994 he introduced a private member's bill, the Technology and Crimes Reform Bill. A select committee recommended against its enactment and it was defeated in the house.

On 8 June 1995, Rogers quit the National Party, having become increasingly frustrated with its refusal to pursue his policies. He joined the Right of Centre, which had been founded by another dissident conservative, Ross Meurant. The Right of Centre party restyled itself as the New Zealand Conservative Party as a result of poor opinion poll performances. After Meurant was dismissed from Government over a conflict of business interests, Meurant left the party and became an independent MP, leaving Rogers as party leader. Despite a belief that they could win 15% of the party vote in the 1996 election, the Conservatives fared badly, gaining only 0.07% of the vote New Zealand wide. Rogers lost his seat, and has never returned to Parliament.

== Life after politics ==
Since leaving Parliament, Rogers has managed engineering companies, principally TGR Helicorp which was placed into receivership in April 2008. TGR HElicorp was a design and manufacturing organisation focussing on unmanned helicopters, although a flying prototype was never completed. All of his other companies (shell or otherwise) were also folded and he was forced by Bank of New Zealand into bankruptcy. The status of some of the assets from his various ventures is in some doubt or dispute and forensic receivers and investigators were called in by the liquidators. Some of the missing assets that were claimed as destroyed or sold by Mr and Mrs Rogers, were later found in concurrent property searches, having been sequestered in various shipping containers around Auckland.

He was jailed for one month for contempt of court in February 2011, and again, together with his wife, in March, after failing to provide the Court with the whereabouts of the intellectual property relating to the helicopter businesses. Mr Rogers was censured for "continually lying to the court".

The Rogers have argued that the intellectual property is in their heads so can not be handed over. A counter offer made by the Rogers to the Court to recreate the intellectual property in exchange for staff, facilities and wages was dismissed by the plaintiff's attorney.
