= Judy Keall =

New Zealand politician

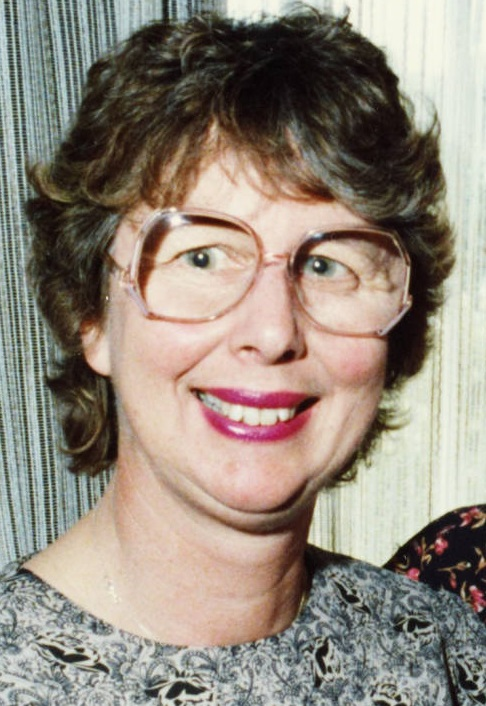
Judy Keall in 1989

Judith Mary Keall (née Dixon, born 10 January 1942) is a former New Zealand politician. She was an MP from 1984 to 1990, and again from 1993 until her retirement in 2002, representing the Labour Party.

== Biography ==
New Zealand Parliament
Years	Term	Electorate	List	Party
1984–1987	41st	Glenfield		Labour
1987–1990	42nd	Glenfield		Labour
1993–1996	44th	Horowhenua		Labour
1996–1999	45th	Otaki	none	Labour
1999–2002	46th	Otaki	21	Labour

Dixon was born in Timaru on 10 May 1942.

She was first elected to Parliament in the 1984 election, winning the North Shore seat of Glenfield. She was re-elected in the 1987 election, but in the 1990 election, she was defeated by National's Peter Hilt. In 1993, Keall was awarded the New Zealand Suffrage Centennial Medal.

In the 1993 election, she returned to Parliament as MP for the lower North Island seat of Horowhenua. After reentering parliament she supported Mike Moore when he was successfully challenged for the leadership by deputy leader Helen Clark. She was appointed by Clark as Labour's spokesperson for consumer affairs and senior citizens. In the 1996 election, when the Horowhenua electorate was abolished, she was elected as MP for the new Otaki electorate. She was re-elected in the 1999 election, but at the 2002 election, she chose to retire from Parliament. She was one of only two electorate MPs who retired in 2002; the other was Labour's Geoff Braybrooke. Keall was succeeded by her former Parliamentary Secretary, Darren Hughes.

Keall chaired Parliament's health select committee and she was the key proponent of legislation that would make bars and restaurants smoke-free.

Keall was separated from her husband Graeme for seven years; part of her motivation to retire from politics was so she could spend more time with him and family.

New Zealand Parliament
New constituency	Member of Parliament for Glenfield; 1984–1990	Succeeded by Peter Hilt
Preceded by Hamish Hancock	Member of Parliament for Horowhenua; 1993–1996	Constituency abolished
New constituency	Member of Parliament for Otaki; 1996–2002	Succeeded by Darren Hughes
