= John Blincoe =

New Zealand politician

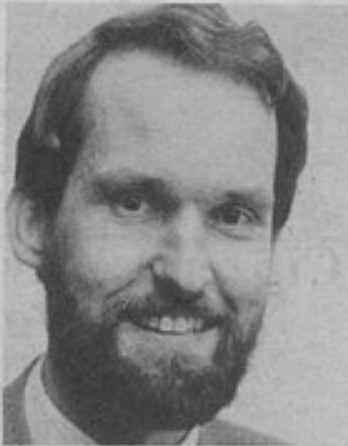
- Blincoe in 1986

Member of the New Zealand Parliament for Nelson
- In office 27 October 1990 – 12 October 1996
- Preceded by: Philip Woollaston
- Succeeded by: Nick Smith

Personal details
- Born: 14 March 1952 (age 74) Nelson, New Zealand
- Party: Labour
- Education: Victoria University
- Profession: Lawyer

John Gary Blincoe (born 1952) is a former New Zealand politician. He was an MP from 1990 to 1996, representing the Labour Party.

== Early life and family ==
Blincoe was born on 14 March 1952 in Nelson, New Zealand. His parents were Victor and May Blincoe (according to his eldest daughter). He attended Hampden Street School, Nelson College Preparatory School and Nelson College, the latter two from 1963 to 1969. Later, he was educated at Victoria University of Wellington, New Zealand where he gained two degrees: one in law and the other in political science.

Prior to becoming a member of New Zealand's Parliament, he had been employed by the Wellington City Council as well as by the Accident Compensation Corporation. Blincoe currently lives in Wellington and has two children.

Blincoe served as the President of NZUSA during 1976. He rose to prominence when he became convener of the Wellington Clean Water Campaign which opposed the council on the Moa Point sewerage treatment plan.

== Early political career ==
In 1983 Blincoe unsuccessfully sought the Labour Party nomination for the seat of Tasman following the retirement of Bill Rowling, but lost to Ken Shirley.

Later that same year, he stood unsuccessfully for the Wellington City Council on a Labour Party ticket. In 1986 he contested the Labour nomination for Mayor of Wellington, but lost to local businessman Jim Belich. He was then elected to the City Council in the Brooklyn Ward in 1986 and then in the Southern Ward in 1989, before resigning from the Council in 1991 when he was elected to Parliament.

== Member of Parliament ==
New Zealand Parliament
| Years | Term | Electorate | Party |
|---|---|---|---|
| 1990–93 | 43rd | Nelson | Labour |
| 1993–96 | 44th | Nelson | Labour |

Blincoe was first elected to Parliament in the 1990 election as MP for Nelson, replacing the outgoing Philip Woollaston. In November 1990 he was appointed as Labour's spokesperson for Conservation by Labour leader Mike Moore. He was re-elected in the 1993 election, but in the 1996 election, the seat of Nelson was expanded into rural areas formerly part of the Tasman electorate. Blincoe was defeated by the incumbent Tasman MP, Nick Smith of the National Party.

=== 1999 election ===
In the 1999 election, Blincoe missed out on returning to Parliament as a list candidate under mixed-member proportional (MMP) representation by a narrow margin once special votes had been counted. Initially it appeared that Blincoe would have a seat in Parliament, as well as a party member directly following him on the Labour list. With the counting of special votes, however, the Green Party entered Parliament after winning an electorate seat and crossed the minimum 5% threshold of votes. In addition, Winston Peters won the constituency seat of Tauranga by a narrow margin of sixty-two votes over a National Party candidate, enabling his New Zealand First party to acquire extra list seats in Parliament.

Once seats had been proportionally re-allocated with both the Green Party and New Zealand First in mind, fewer list seats were available for other parties, and consequently John Blincoe was not allocated a seat.

== Post Parliament ==
Blincoe worked as an environmental adviser to Prime Minister Helen Clark during the 2000s and has worked on environmental matters since then. He, along with Ray Ahipene-Mercer, led the Wellington Clean Water Campaign, which successfully sought to have Wellington to treat its sewage, and stop dumping it, raw, in the sea.

New Zealand Parliament
| Preceded by Philip Woollaston | Member of Parliament for Nelson; 1990–1996 | Succeeded by Nick Smith |
Political offices
| Preceded by Rodney Murphy | Wellington City Councillor for Southern Ward; 1989–1991 | Succeeded by Margaret Bonner |
