= Taito Phillip Field =

Samoan New Zealand politician (1952–2021)

- Field in 1995.

Leader of New Zealand Pacific Party
- In office 15 April 2007 – 2 September 2010
- Preceded by: Position established
- Succeeded by: Position abolished

Member of the New Zealand Parliament for Mangere
- In office 12 October 1996 – 8 November 2008
- Preceded by: David Lange
- Succeeded by: William Sio

Member of the New Zealand Parliament for Otara
- In office 6 November 1993 – 12 October 1996
- Preceded by: Trevor Rogers
- Succeeded by: Seat Abolished

Personal details
- Born: Phillip Hans Field; 26 September 1952 Apia, Western Samoa
- Died: 23 September 2021 (aged 68) Auckland, New Zealand
- Party: Labour Party; New Zealand Pacific Party

Taito Phillip Hans Field (26 September 1952 – 23 September 2021) was a Samoan-born New Zealand trade unionist and politician. A member of Parliament (MP) for South Auckland electorates from 1993 to 2008, Field was the first New Zealand MP of Pasifika descent. He was a minister outside Cabinet in a Labour-led government from 2003 to 2005.

Following charges of bribery and perverting the course of justice, Field was defeated in the 2008 New Zealand general election. He was found guilty on some of the charges in August 2009 and was sentenced to six years jail in October 2009.

== Early life ==
Born in Apia, the capital of what was then the Territory of Western Samoa, he gained the name of Taito, the matai (paramount chief) title of the village of Manase on Savai'i, Samoa, in 1975. He was of Samoan, Cook Island, German, English, and Jewish ancestry. He was a pioneering figure for Pasifika New Zealanders while in the Labour Party.

He worked for the New Zealand Treasury in the 1970s and then as a union official for the Hotel, Hospital & Restaurant Union and the Service Workers Union (now E tū).

In 1990 he was awarded the New Zealand 1990 Commemoration Medal.

== Member of Parliament ==
New Zealand Parliament
Years	Term	Electorate	List	Party
1993–1996	44th	Otara		Labour
1996–1999	45th	Mangere	none	Labour
1999–2002	46th	Mangere	14	Labour
2002–2005	47th	Mangere	none	Labour
2005–2007	48th	Mangere	13	Labour
2007–2008	Changed allegiance to:			Independent

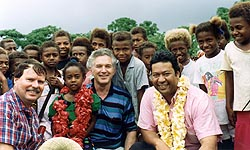
Field (right) with Ian Revell and Max Bradford on a working MPs trip to Vanuatu in 1995.

Field first became a Member of Parliament when elected by the South Auckland seat of Otara in the 1993 election. He had stood for Otara in 1990 to replace Colin Moyle who was retiring, but with the swing against Labour in 1990 he was defeated by Trevor Rogers of the National Party.

Field delivered his maiden statement on 10 March 1994. He commented on his status as the first New Zealand MP of Pasifika descent elected to Parliament: "I have been attributed as being the first Pacific Island member of Parliament in New Zealand. I take pride in that status but feel humbled by the responsibility that it carries. As a passing thought, I have wondered about the accuracy of this tribute. The islands of Aotearoa are islands in the Pacific Ocean, notwithstanding those parts in the Tasman Sea. So in a sense, all New Zealanders are Pacific Islanders."

In 1996 he was elected as MP for Mangere, succeeding David Lange. He was appointed parliamentary under-secretary for Pacific island affairs, social services and justice in 2002. He held the position of Minister outside Cabinet, with the portfolios of Associate Minister for Pacific Island Affairs, Associate Minister for Social Development and Employment, and Associate Minister for Justice, from 2003 until he was stood down in 2005.

In the September 2005 general election, Field won a majority of more than 16,000 over his nearest opponent, Clem Simich of the National Party. This was the largest majority in any electorate seat in New Zealand.

=== 2004 Israel–New Zealand passport scandal ===
An incident of passport fraud carried out by alleged Mossad agents in July 2004 led New Zealand to take diplomatic sanctions against Israel. High-level contacts between the two countries were suspended including the cancellation by New Zealand of a planned visit by Israeli President Moshe Katzav and approval for a new Israeli ambassador to New Zealand was delayed. Australian Jewish News credited Field with acting as a bridge between the two governments when he visited Nissan Krupsky, the former Israeli ambassador to New Zealand, in Israel in December. AJN reported that Field met with Israel's Foreign Ministry officials secretly because of the NZ ban on meetings between the government's officials. New Zealand Foreign Minister Phil Goff denied Field played any significant role in overcoming the diplomatic impasse on 1 July. "It wasn't a high-level visit. What he was doing was in a private capacity to see people he knew in Israel and I didn't raise any objection to him going." According to AJN, "While Field's visit eventually turned out to have critical diplomatic significance, it was described as private so as not to be seen as violating the sanctions imposed by Clark. Nonetheless, throughout his visit Field served as middleman between the two Governments, maintaining phone contacts with Wellington in order to secure Clark's approval for the start of the Ankara talks." Goff denied that the talks between Israel's FM official Michael Ronen and Ambassador Henderson were a direct result of Field's visit.

=== Conflict of interest allegations ===
In October 2005, Field lost his ministerial posts following controversies around allegations that he had improperly used his influence as an MP to receive material gain. In particular, it was alleged that he had used his position as a Member of Parliament to obtain a work permit for a non-resident who had worked as a tiler at reduced hourly rates on his home in Samoa. It was also alleged that Field had used his position to obtain a discounted price for a property deal he had constructed with low-income welfare beneficiaries in his electorate. An inquiry cleared him of any conflict of interest, but did criticise his judgement over the events.

Further allegations of improper behaviour were made by the Television New Zealand Sunday programme on 27 August 2006, which led to Prime Minister Helen Clark saying that Field should reconsider his future as an MP. Police launched an investigation the following day into claims that Field had benefited from helping people with immigration applications. Field was put on indefinite paid leave from Parliament by the Labour Party. After Field made comments to the media that he might run against the Labour Party in a future election, steps were taken on 13 February 2007 by Labour to expel Field from the party.

=== Independent ===
On 14 February 2007, Field was formally expelled from the parliamentary caucus of the Labour Party. This was announced by the Speaker of the House of Representatives, Margaret Wilson. To forestall moves to expel him from the Labour Party altogether, Field resigned on 16 February 2007, returning to Parliament as an independent, but promising to support the Government's legislative programme. However, on 21 February, he voted against the Labour Party on Green MP Sue Bradford's Members' Bill to amend Section 59 of the Crimes Act 1961 (see Child Discipline Act 2007).

=== New political party ===
In April 2007 Field told The Sunday Star-Times he would form a new political party based on family values. Field cited opposition to Sue Bradford's Bill to remove the defence for child discipline as an example of a "groundswell of Christian people" and stated "There is a vacuum, there is room for a political party... people are looking for a new vehicle." Field also had meetings with Richard Lewis, leader of Destiny Church political party Destiny New Zealand, over a possible alliance. In January 2008, Field moved to register the New Zealand Pacific Party.

In the 2008 New Zealand general election, Field lost his seat to incoming new Labour MP William Sio by 7126 votes. The New Zealand Pacific Party won 0.37% of party votes cast, well below the 5% threshold needed to gain list representation, so won no seats in Parliament.

== Corruption charges ==
On 24 May 2007, police announced that they would seek the leave of the High Court to lay corruption charges against Field (a necessary procedural step when such charges are laid in New Zealand). The offence, corruption and bribery of a member of Parliament, carries a maximum sentence of 7 years' imprisonment. If Field was convicted while still a member, his Parliamentary seat would have been vacated.

At a press conference following the police announcement, Field asserted his innocence of the charges and expressed his intention to fight both the laying of the charges at the leave hearing, and any charges that might result from the police application. On 5 October 2007 the High Court ruled that the police could lay corruption charges against Field. The Thai tiler at the centre of the corruption allegations, Sunan Siriwan, announced he would sue Field for $200,000 compensation for the year's work he undertook on Field's property in Samoa.

Field appeared in court on 26 November 2007 on 15 counts of bribery and 25 of attempting to pervert the course of justice, and was released on bail without entering a plea. After a depositions hearing in mid-2008, he was remanded to the High Court for trial on 40 charges. On 20 April 2009, his trial commenced on 35 charges, 12 for corruption and bribery as a member of Parliament and 23 for wilfully perverting the course of justice. On 4 August 2009, Field was found guilty of 26 charges at the High Court in Auckland. The ten member jury found Field guilty of 11 of the 12 bribery and corruption charges, and 15 of 23 charges relating to attempting to pervert the course of justice.

On 6 October 2009, Field was jailed for six years on corruption charges, with the sentencing judge saying his offending threatened the foundation of democracy and justice. Field's wife, Maxine Gallagher-Field, has said that her husband is treated like a chief in jail by other inmates.

The Court of Appeal upheld the conviction and sentence in November 2010. An appeal began to be heard in the Supreme Court in June 2011.

He was released from prison on parole on 17 October 2011. Shortly after his release, his appeal in the Supreme Court was unanimously dismissed. The appeal revolved around a de minimis defence.

== Illegal building ==
Field and the company T P Field Developments Limited (of which Field was one of two directors, and the sole shareholder) admitted illegally converting a garage into a family room and a carport into a garage at a Papatoetoe residence and were fined a total of $20,000 plus costs in 2008.

== After release ==
After his release, Field worked on property development projects in New Zealand and Samoa, and started work on a biography.

Field died in Auckland on 23 September 2021, aged 68.

== Political offices ==
New Zealand Parliament
Preceded by Trevor Rogers	Member of Parliament for Otara; 1993–1996	Seat abolished
Preceded by David Lange	Member of Parliament for Mangere; 1996–2008	Succeeded by William Sio
Party political offices
New political party	Leader of the New Zealand Pacific Party; 2008–2010	Political party deregistered
