= Peter Hilt =

New Zealand politician (1942–2025

Peter Malcolm Hilt (5 January 1942 – 19 April 2025) was a New Zealand politician.

== Life and career ==
New Zealand Parliament
Years	Term	Electorate	Party
1990–1993	43rd	Glenfield	National
1993–1995	44th	Glenfield	National
1995–1996	Changed allegiance to:		United NZ

Hilt was born in Auckland, and attended Takapuna Grammar School. He was in the New Zealand Police for 18 years, becoming a Detective Sergeant.

He was an MP from 1990 to 1996, representing first the National Party and then United New Zealand. He was first elected to Parliament in the 1990 election, defeating Labour's Judy Keall in the Glenfield seat. In 1995, however, he left National to join the new United New Zealand Party, founded as a centrist group by seven sitting MPs. In the 1996 general election, he was not re-elected. He stood in the Northcote electorate where he came fifth. He was ranked in 6th place on United's party list, but with the party receiving only 0.88% of the party vote, it did not qualify for any list MPs.

In the 44th New Zealand Parliament, Hilt was elected Deputy Chairman of Committees on 1 March 1995 after Joy McLauchlan resigned that position on 27 February. Hilt was the last to hold this role as it was disestablished on 21 February 1996. Though he had by this time left the National Party, Hilt continued in the succeeding position of first Assistant Speaker. Until the appointment of Green MP Teanau Tuiono as third assistant speaker in 2023, he was the only presiding officer of the New Zealand House of Representatives since 1943 not to have been a member of either National or Labour while serving.

Hilt died on 19 April 2025, at the age of 83.
