= Māngere (electorate) =

- Single-member general constituency for the New Zealand House of Representatives
- Interactive map of boundaries from the 2026 election
- Formation: 1969
- Region: Auckland
- Character: Suburban
- Term: 3 years

Member for Māngere
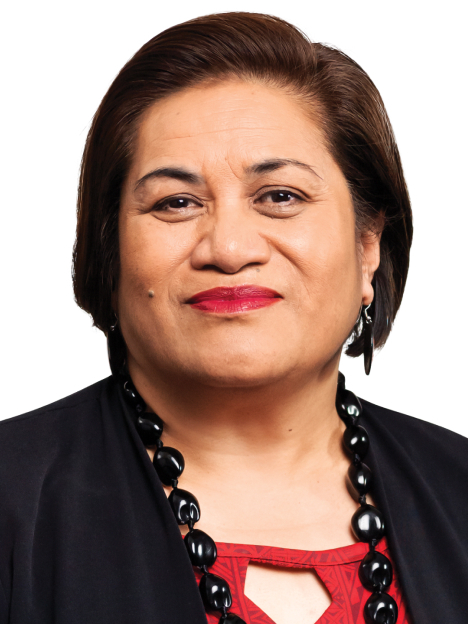
- Lemauga Lydia Sosene since 14 October 2023
- Party: Labour
- Previous MP: William Sio (Labour)
Party vote distribution

Māngere (spelled Mangere before 1997) is a New Zealand parliamentary electorate, returning one member of parliament to the Representatives of New Zealand. The current MP for Māngere is Lemauga Lydia Sosene of the Labour Party. She has held this electorate since 2023.

== Population centres ==
Through an amendment in the Electoral Act in 1965, the number of electorates in the South Island was fixed at 25, an increase of one since the 1962 electoral redistribution. It was accepted that through the more rapid population growth in the North Island, the number of its electorates would continue to increase, and to keep proportionality, three new electorates were allowed for in the 1967 electoral redistribution for the next election. In the North Island, five electorates were newly created (including Mangere) and one electorate was reconstituted while three electorates were abolished. In the South Island, three electorates were newly created and one electorate was reconstituted while three electorates were abolished. The overall effect of the required changes was highly disruptive to existing electorates, with all but three electorates having their boundaries altered. These changes came into effect with the 1969 election.

Māngere is based around the South Auckland suburbs of Māngere, Māngere Bridge, Favona and Māngere East. It has existed as an electorate since 1969; its boundaries were extended ahead of the introduction of mixed-member proportional (MMP) voting in 1996, swallowing up a section of the former Papatoetoe electorate.

Map of boundaries at the 2020 and 2023 general elections

In the 2007 boundary redistribution, Papatoetoe and Middlemore were transferred to the Manukau East electorate. The 2013/14 and 2020 redistributions did not change the boundaries further. The 2025 boundary review moved an area in Papatoetoe between State Highway 1 and the North Island Main Trunk from Manurewa while transferring back an area in Wiri.

== History ==
Māngere, and all of South Auckland, forms the safest part of the Labour Party's core vote. Even during landslide elections in the National Party's favour, such as in 1975 and 1990, no Labour candidate for Māngere was seriously troubled.

Māngere was first represented by Colin Moyle of the Labour Party in 1969. Moyle represented the electorate until his resignation in 1977 over what became known as the 'Moyle Affair', and a subsequent by-election was won by a young barrister named David Lange, who would become Prime Minister after Labour's 1984 election victory. Lange retired in 1996 and the nomination was handed to Taito Phillip Field, at the time the MP for Otara. Field was returned with a high share of the vote in subsequent elections, but following his expulsion from the Labour caucus in 2007, his former party nominated former Manukau City deputy mayor William Sio in his place, who won the seat with a majority of over 7,000 votes in the 2008 election. In the 2011 and 2014 elections, Sio's majority was circa 15,000 votes.

=== Members of Parliament ===
Unless otherwise stated, all MPs terms began and started at general elections.

Key

Labour National Independent

Election	Winner
1969 election	Colin Moyle
1972 election	Colin Moyle
1975 election	Colin Moyle
1977 by-election	David Lange
1978 election	David Lange
1981 election	David Lange
1984 election	David Lange
1987 election	David Lange
1990 election	David Lange
1993 election	David Lange
1996 election	Taito Phillip Field (Note: Field was expelled from the Labour caucus on 14 February 2007.)
1999 election	Taito Phillip Field
2002 election	Taito Phillip Field
2005 election	Taito Phillip Field
2008 election	William Sio
2011 election	William Sio
2014 election	William Sio
2017 election	William Sio
2020 election	William Sio
2023 election	Lydia Sosene
2026 election	Lydia Sosene

=== List MPs ===
Members of Parliament elected from party lists in elections where that person also unsuccessfully contested the Māngere electorate. Unless otherwise stated, all MPs terms began and ended at general elections.

Election	Winner
2005 election	Clem Simich
2013	Claudette Hauiti (Note: Hauiti entered Parliament on 8 May 2013 following Aaron Gilmore's resignation.)
2019	Agnes Loheni (Note: Loheni entered Parliament on 12 February 2019 following Chris Finlayson's resignation.)

== Election results ==
=== 2026 election ===
The next election will be held on 7 November 2026. Candidates for Māngere are listed at Candidates in the 2026 New Zealand general election by electorate § Māngere. Official results will be available after 27 November 2026.

=== 2023 election ===
2023 general election: Māngere
Notes:	Blue background denotes the winner of the electorate vote. Pink background denotes a candidate elected from their party list. Yellow background denotes an electorate win by a list member, or other incumbent. A ✓ or ✗ denotes status of any incumbent, win or lose respectively.						
Party	Candidate	Votes	%	±%	Party votes	%	±%
Labour	Lemauga Lydia Sosene	17,297	59.61	–14.35	18,042	60.72	–15.66
National	Rosemary Bourke	5,585	19.24	+7.37	5,656	19.03	+10.04
Green	Peter Sykes	2,700	9.30	+3.13	2,306	7.76	+3.83
Te Pāti Māori	Hilda Peters	934	3.21	–	628	2.11	+1.23
ACT	Pothen Joseph	670	2.30	–	624	2.10	+0.58
Vision NZ	Fuiavailili Alailima	535	1.84	–			
Independent	Brooke Pao Stanley	502	1.73	–			
NZ First					973	3.27	+0.55
Opportunities					272	0.91	+0.51
Freedoms NZ					266	0.89	–
NewZeal					244	0.82	+0.58
Legalise Cannabis					120	0.40	0.00
NZ Loyal					94	0.31	–
New Conservatives					54	0.18	–1.52
Animal Justice					41	0.13	–
Women's Rights					26	0.08	–
DemocracyNZ					17	0.05	–
Leighton Baker Party					12	0.04	–
New Nation					11	0.03	–
Informal votes		793			327		
Total valid votes		29,016			29,713		
Labour hold	Majority	11,712	40.36	–21.73			

=== 2020 election ===
2020 general election: Māngere
Notes:	Blue background denotes the winner of the electorate vote. Pink background denotes a candidate elected from their party list. Yellow background denotes an electorate win by a list member, or other incumbent. A ✓ or ✗ denotes status of any incumbent, win or lose respectively.						
Party	Candidate	Votes	%	±%	Party votes	%	±%
Labour	✓ William Sio	23,104	73.96	+5.27	24,167	76.38	+5.94
National	Agnes Loheni	3,708	11.87	−3.49	2,846	8.99	−8.20
Green	Peter Brian Sykes	1,930	6.17	+1.78	1,246	3.93	+1.24
New Conservative	Fuiavailili Alailima	866	2.77	+2.08	540	1.70	+1.44
Independent	Wayne Tetou Nooroa	166	0.53	—			
Climate First	Leslie Jones	57	0.18	—			
NZ First					862	2.72	−2.38
ACT					483	1.52	+1.40
Advance NZ					333	1.05	—
Māori Party					280	0.88	−1.14
Legalise Cannabis					128	0.40	+0.14
Opportunities					127	0.40	−0.27
Vision NZ					102	0.32	—
ONE					79	0.24	—
Sustainable NZ					12	0.03	—
Social Credit					11	0.03	—
Outdoors					9	0.02	+0.01
TEA					9	0.02	—
Heartland					3	0.01	—
Informal votes		1,255			400		
Total valid votes		31,237			31,637		
Turnout		31,908	68.35				
Labour hold	Majority	19,396	62.09	+8.76			

=== 2017 election ===
2017 general election: Māngere
Notes:	Blue background denotes the winner of the electorate vote. Pink background denotes a candidate elected from their party list. Yellow background denotes an electorate win by a list member, or other incumbent. A ✓ or ✗ denotes status of any incumbent, win or lose respectively.						
Party	Candidate	Votes	%	±%	Party votes	%	±%
Labour	✓ William Sio	18,810	68.69	−2.40	19,931	70.44	+3.51
National	Agnes Loheni	4,213	15.36	+0.41	4,864	17.19	+1.68
Green	Elaine Dyett	1,203	4.39	−0.08	760	2.69	−1.24
NZ First	Mataroa Paroro	1,097	4.01	—	1,447	5.10	−2.18
Māori Party	Esther Tofilau-Tevaga	880	3.22	—	573	2.02	+1.57
Mana Party	James Papali'i	330	1.21	−0.81	48	0.17	—
Conservative	Kevin Stitt	189	0.69	—	73	0.26	−2.78
Communist League	Felicity Coggan	48	0.18	—			
Opportunities					191	0.67	—
Legalise Cannabis					74	0.26	−0.05
People's Party					37	0.13	—
ACT					35	0.12	−0.13
United Future					10	0.04	−0.05
Internet					6	0.02	—
Ban 1080					3	0.01	−0.03
Outdoors					3	0.01	—
Democrats					2	0.01	−0.02
Informal votes		613			240		
Total valid votes		27,363			28,297		
Labour hold	Majority	14,957	53.33	−2.82			

=== 2014 election ===
2014 general election: Māngere
Notes:	Blue background denotes the winner of the electorate vote. Pink background denotes a candidate elected from their party list. Yellow background denotes an electorate win by a list member, or other incumbent. A ✓ or ✗ denotes status of any incumbent, win or lose respectively.						
Party	Candidate	Votes	%	±%	Party votes	%	±%
Labour	✓ William Sio	18,908	71.09	−4.81	18,470	66.93	−4.89
National	Misa Fia Turner	3,975	14.95	+2.35	4,281	15.51	+1.15
Conservative	Edward Saafi	1,473	5.54	+3.10	839	3.04	+1.43
Green	Muamua Sofi Strickson-Pua	1,190	4.47	+0.17	1,084	3.93	+0.08
Mana	James Papali'i	536	2.02	+0.26			
NZ First					2,008	7.28	+1.42
Internet Mana					324	1.17	+0.16 (Note: 2014 Internet Mana swing is relative to the votes for Mana in 2011; it shared a party list with Internet in the 2014 election.)
Māori Party					124	0.45	−0.09
Legalise Cannabis					86	0.31	−0.07
ACT					68	0.25	−0.06
United Future					26	0.09	−0.11
Ban 1080					10	0.04	+0.04
Democrats					7	0.03	+0.03
Independent Coalition					5	0.02	+0.02
Focus					3	0.01	+0.01
Civilian					3	0.01	+0.01
Informal votes		514			514		
Total valid votes		26,596			27,597		
Turnout		27,597	66.69	+3.44			
Labour hold	Majority	14,933	56.15	−7.15			

=== 2011 election ===
2011 general election: Māngere
Notes:	Blue background denotes the winner of the electorate vote. Pink background denotes a candidate elected from their party list. Yellow background denotes an electorate win by a list member, or other incumbent. A ✓ or ✗ denotes status of any incumbent, win or lose respectively.						
Party	Candidate	Votes	%	±%	Party votes	%	±%
Labour	✓ William Sio	18,177	75.90	+23.49	17,960	71.82	+10.22
National	Claudette Hauiti	3,018	12.60	−1.35	3,592	14.36	−2.07
Green	Todd Ross	1,030	4.30	+2.06	962	3.85	+1.81
NZ First	Olivia Ilalio	597	2.49	+2.49	1,466	5.86	+2.55
Conservative	Fa'avae Gagamoe	584	2.44	+2.44	402	1.61	+1.61
Mana	James Papali'i	422	1.76	+1.76	252	1.01	+1.01
ACT	Casey Costello	121	0.51	−0.52	77	0.31	−0.81
Māori Party					134	0.54	−0.43
Legalise Cannabis					95	0.38	-0.003
United Future					49	0.20	−0.67
Alliance					14	0.06	+0.03
Libertarianz					4	0.02	−0.01
Democrats					0	0.00	−0.01
Informal votes		856			518		
Total valid votes		23,949			25,007		
Labour hold	Majority	15,159	63.30	+33.78			

Electorate (as at 26 November 2011): 39,534

=== 2008 election ===
2008 general election: Māngere
Notes:	Blue background denotes the winner of the electorate vote. Pink background denotes a candidate elected from their party list. Yellow background denotes an electorate win by a list member, or other incumbent. A ✓ or ✗ denotes status of any incumbent, win or lose respectively.						
Party	Candidate	Votes	%	±%	Party votes	%	±%
Labour	William Sio	12,651	52.40		15,446	61.60	
Pacific	✗ Taito Phillip Field	5,525	22.89		2,683	10.70	
National	Mita Harris	3,368	13.95		4,120	16.43	
Family Party	Galumalemana Jerry Filipaina	999	4.14		297	1.18	
Green	Muamua Sofi Strickson-Pua	541	2.24		511	2.04	
United Future	Pulotu Selio Solomon	443	1.84		218	0.87	
ACT	Michael Tabachnik	247	1.02		280	1.12	
RAM	Roger Fowler	154	0.64		16	0.06	
Progressive	Tala Po'e	150	0.62		165	0.66	
Independent	Lemalu Talia Matatumua	63	0.26				
NZ First					830	3.31	
Māori Party					241	0.96	
Legalise Cannabis					96	0.38	
Bill and Ben					75	0.30	
Kiwi					65	0.26	
Workers Party					16	0.06	
Alliance					6	0.02	
Libertarianz					6	0.02	
Democrats					2	0.01	
RONZ					1	0.00	
Informal votes		411			279		
Total valid votes		24,141			25,074		
Labour hold	Majority	7,126	29.52				

Note: lines coloured beige denote the winner of the electorate vote. Lines coloured pink denote a candidate elected to Parliament from their party list.

=== 2005 election ===
2005 general election: Māngere
Notes:	Blue background denotes the winner of the electorate vote. Pink background denotes a candidate elected from their party list. Yellow background denotes an electorate win by a list member, or other incumbent. A ✓ or ✗ denotes status of any incumbent, win or lose respectively.						
Party	Candidate	Votes	%	±%	Party votes	%	±%
Labour	✓ Taito Phillip Field	19,633	70.64		20,900	72.89	
National	Clem Simich	3,613	13.00		3,894	13.58	
Destiny	Edward Saafi	892	3.21		445	1.55	
NZ First	Toa Greening	831	2.99		1,189	4.15	
Green	Mua Strickson-Pua	767	2.76		503	1.75	
United Future	Neville Wilson	573	2.06		467	1.63	
Māori Party	Solomon Matthews	522	1.88		330	1.15	
Progressive	Tala Po'e	341	1.23		429	1.50	
Family Rights	Susie Po'a Williams	305	1.10		184	0.64	
Alliance	Len Richards	204	0.73		48	0.17	
Direct Democracy	Paul Teio	56	0.20		7	0.02	
Independent	Mark Muller	56	0.20				
ACT					141	0.49	
Legalise Cannabis					59	0.21	
Christian Heritage					42	0.15	
One NZ					8	0.03	
Democrats					5	0.02	
Libertarianz					5	0.02	
99 MP					2	0.01	
RONZ					2	0.01	
Informal votes		453			293		
Total valid votes		27,793			28,674		
Labour hold	Majority	16,020					

=== 2002 election ===
2002 general election: Māngere
Notes:	Blue background denotes the winner of the electorate vote. Pink background denotes a candidate elected from their party list. Yellow background denotes an electorate win by a list member, or other incumbent. A ✓ or ✗ denotes status of any incumbent, win or lose respectively.						
Party	Candidate	Votes	%	±%	Party votes	%	±%
Labour	✓ Taito Phillip Field	17,995	73.15		17,586	70.28	
National	Sylvia Taylor	2,620	10.65		1,839	7.35	
Green	Steve Abel	874	3.55		806	3.22	
United Future	Bruce Settle	754	3.07		889	3.55	
Progressive	Rosie Brown	609	2.48		618	2.47	
ACT	Juanita Angell	467	1.90		573	2.26	
Christian Heritage	Steven Panapa	442	1.80		345	1.38	
Alliance	Len Richards	350	2.19		273	1.09	
NZ First					1,585	6.33	
Legalise Cannabis					164	0.66	
ORNZ					83	0.33	
Mana Māori					31	0.12	
One NZ					9	0.04	
NMP					3	0.01	
Informal votes		488			218		
Total valid votes		24,599			25,022		
Labour hold	Majority	15,375	62.50				

=== 1999 election ===
1999 general election: Māngere
Notes:	Blue background denotes the winner of the electorate vote. Pink background denotes a candidate elected from their party list. Yellow background denotes an electorate win by a list member, or other incumbent. A ✓ or ✗ denotes status of any incumbent, win or lose respectively.						
Party	Candidate	Votes	%	±%	Party votes	%	±%
Labour	✓ Taito Phillip Field	15,888	68.60	+12.66	15,881	67.32	+12.55
National	Sylvia Taylor	2,841	12.27		2,863	12.14	−5.52
Alliance	Finau Kolo	2,279	9.84		1,945	8.25	−0.66
Christian Heritage	Steven Aotearoa Panapa	573	2.47		396	1.68	
NZ First	Jerry Nuia Hohepa	571	2.47		688	2.92	−7.21
ACT	Adrian Jon Dixon	458	1.98		544	2.31	+0.26
Independent	Kelvyn Glen Alp	389	1.68				
Natural Law	Grant Bilyard	89	0.38	0.00	66	0.28	+0.04
Mana Wahine Te Ira Tangata	Te Aroha Wepiha Reo	71	0.31				
Green					603	2.56	
Legalise Cannabis					182	0.77	−0.61
Christian Democrats					149	0.63	
Mauri Pacific					56	0.24	
United NZ					56	0.24	−0.20
Libertarianz					52	0.22	+0.18
Animals First					36	0.15	−0.03
McGillicuddy Serious					22	0.09	−0.09
Mana Māori					20	0.08	+0.03
One NZ					10	0.04	
Freedom Movement					6	0.03	
Republican					5	0.02	
The People's Choice					5	0.02	
NMP					4	0.02	
South Island					1	0.00	
Informal votes		947			516		
Total valid votes		24,106			24,106		
Labour hold	Majority	13,047	56.33	+17.08			

=== 1996 election ===
1996 general election: Mangere
Notes:	Blue background denotes the winner of the electorate vote. Pink background denotes a candidate elected from their party list. Yellow background denotes an electorate win by a list member, or other incumbent. A ✓ or ✗ denotes status of any incumbent, win or lose respectively.						
Party	Candidate	Votes	%	±%	Party votes	%	±%
Labour	Taito Phillip Field	13,277	55.94		13,118	54.77	
National	David Broome	3,960	16.68		4,230	17.66	
Alliance	Len Richards	3,190	13.44	−2.32	2,134	8.91	
NZ First	Thomas Moana	1,972	8.31		2,426	10.13	
Christian Coalition	James Ward	563	2.37		728	3.04	
ACT	Kevin Mathewson	409	1.72		492	2.05	
Advance New Zealand	Afamasaga Rasmussen	180	0.76		88	0.37	
United NZ	Francis Ifopo	94	0.40		105	0.44	
Natural Law	Grant Bilyard	90	0.38		57	0.24	
Legalise Cannabis					330	1.38	
Ethnic Minority Party					55	0.23	
Progressive Green					49	0.20	
McGillicuddy Serious					44	0.18	
Animals First					42	0.18	
Green Society					13	0.05	
Mana Māori					11	0.05	
Asia Pacific United					9	0.04	
Libertarianz					9	0.04	
Superannuitants & Youth					7	0.03	
Conservatives					5	0.02	
Te Tawharau					0	0.00	
Informal votes		469			252		
Total valid votes		23,735			23,952		
Labour hold	Majority	9,317	39.25				

=== 1993 election ===
1993 general election: Mangere
Party	Candidate	Votes	%	±%
Labour	David Lange	8,345	55.12	+4.02
Alliance	Len Richards	2,387	15.76	+3.97
NZ First	Bryan Archer	2,037	13.45	−8.92
National	Hinu Te Hau	1,120	7.39	
Christian Heritage	Clark Nemeth	135	0.89	
Communist League	Karen Davis	84	0.55	
McGillicuddy Serious	Alister Webb	77	0.50	
Natural Law	Grant Bilyard	53	0.35	
Majority		5,958	39.36	+10.63
Turnout		15,137	83.00	−3.27
Registered electors		18,237		

=== 1990 election ===
1990 general election: Mangere
Party	Candidate	Votes	%	±%
Labour	David Lange	7,184	51.10	−19.50
National	Bryan Archer	3,145	22.37	
NewLabour	Len Richards	1,658	11.79	
Green	Brian Edwards	832	5.91	
Democrats	Ken Harris	148	1.05	
Independent	Joshua Deane	55	0.39	
Majority		4,039	28.73	−19.54
Turnout		14,058	79.73	−1.62
Registered electors		17,631		

=== 1987 election ===
1987 general election: Mangere
Party	Candidate	Votes	%	±%
Labour	David Lange	8,804	70.60	−2.23
National	Ron Jeffery	2,785	22.33	
Democrats	Ken Harris	724	5.80	
Mana Motuhake	K K Pene	156	1.25	
Majority		6,019	48.27	−8.86
Turnout		12,469	81.35	−4.86
Registered electors		15,326		

=== 1984 election ===
1984 general election: Mangere
Party	Candidate	Votes	%	±%
Labour	David Lange	10,676	72.83	+10.58
National	Peter Saunders	2,301	15.69	
NZ Party	John Meyer	1,096	7.47	
Social Credit	Terry John Brooks	584	3.98	
Majority		8,375	57.13	+15.78
Turnout		14,657	86.21	+3.64
Registered electors		17,001		

=== 1981 election ===
1981 general election: Mangere
Party	Candidate	Votes	%	±%
Labour	David Lange	8,739	62.25	−3.98
Social Credit	John Pettit	2,933	20.89	
National	David Perry	2,366	16.85	
Majority		5,806	41.35	−4.21
Turnout		14,038	82.57	+18.65
Registered electors		17,001		

=== 1978 election ===
1978 general election: Mangere
Party	Candidate	Votes	%	±%
Labour	David Lange	9,104	66.23	+7.96
National	Peter Saunders	2,841	20.67	
Social Credit	H J Meiklejohn	1,655	12.04	
Values	V A Strachan	144	1.04	
Majority		6,263	45.56	+17.76
Turnout		13,744	63.92	−0.39
Registered electors		21,499		

=== 1977 by-election ===
1977 Mangere by-election
Party	Candidate	Votes	%	±%
Labour	David Lange	9,766	58.27	
National	Clem Simich	5,107	30.48	
Social Credit	Bill Owens	1,026	6.10	−0.07
Values	Frank Grayson	789	4.71	−1.02
Worker's Labour	Barry Moss	28	0.17	
Alpha	Paul Magoffin	18	0.11	
Independent Labour	Barry Shaw	17	0.10	
Socialist Action	Brigid Mulrennan	7	0.04	
Majority		4,659	27.80	
Turnout		16,758	64.31	−15.35
Registered electors		26,058		
Labour hold		Swing		

=== 1975 election ===
1975 general election: Mangere
Party	Candidate	Votes	%	±%
Labour	Colin Moyle	8,332	48.64	−11.08
National	Stanley Lawson	6,728	39.28	+6.33
Social Credit	Bill Owens	1,057	6.17	
Values	Frank Grayson	983	5.73	
Socialist Unity	Ella Ayo	14	0.08	
Socialist	T A Gribble	14	0.08	
Majority		1,604	9.36	−17.40
Turnout		17,128	79.66	−8.05
Registered electors		21,499		

=== 1972 election ===
1972 general election: Mangere
Party	Candidate	Votes	%	±%
Labour	Colin Moyle	8,788	59.72	−2.59
National	Stanley Lawson	4,849	32.95	
Social Credit	Gavin Logan	982	6.67	
New Democratic	P J Quinn	96	0.65	
Majority		3,939	26.76	−3.91
Turnout		14,715	87.71	+1.75
Registered electors		16,775		

=== 1969 election ===
1969 general election: Mangere
Party	Candidate	Votes	%	±%
Labour	Colin Moyle	9,321	62.31	
National	Neville Charles Slater	4,733	31.63	
Social Credit	Ernest Richard James	905	6.04	
Majority		4,588	30.67	
Turnout		14,959	85.96	
Registered electors		17,401		
