= 1990 New Zealand general election =

General election in New Zealand

- 27 October 1990

All 97 seats in the House of Representatives 49 seats needed for a majority

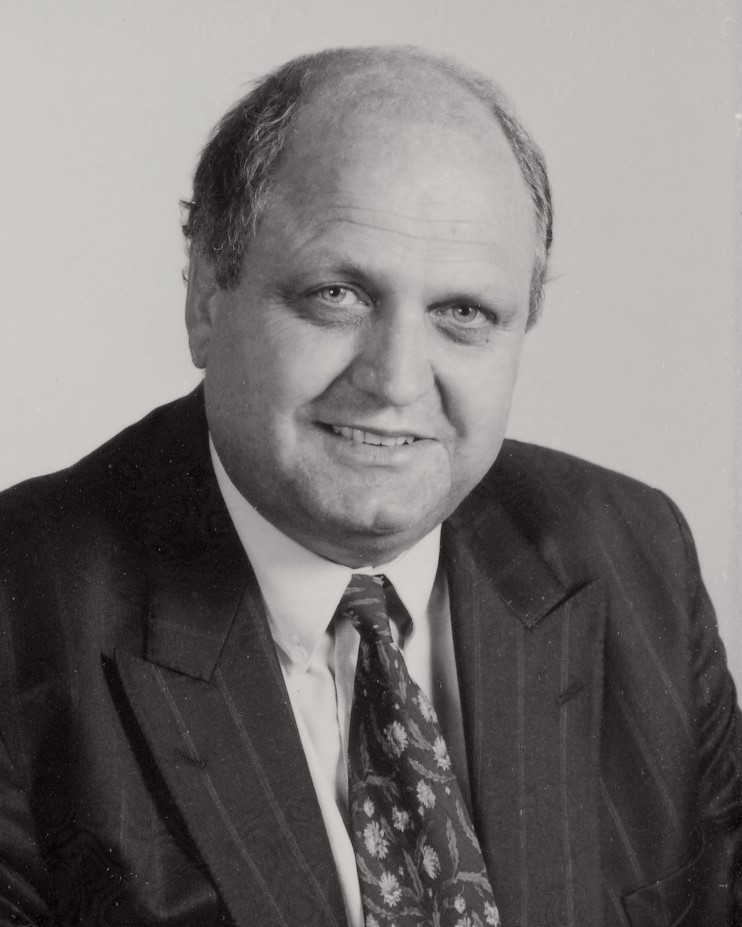

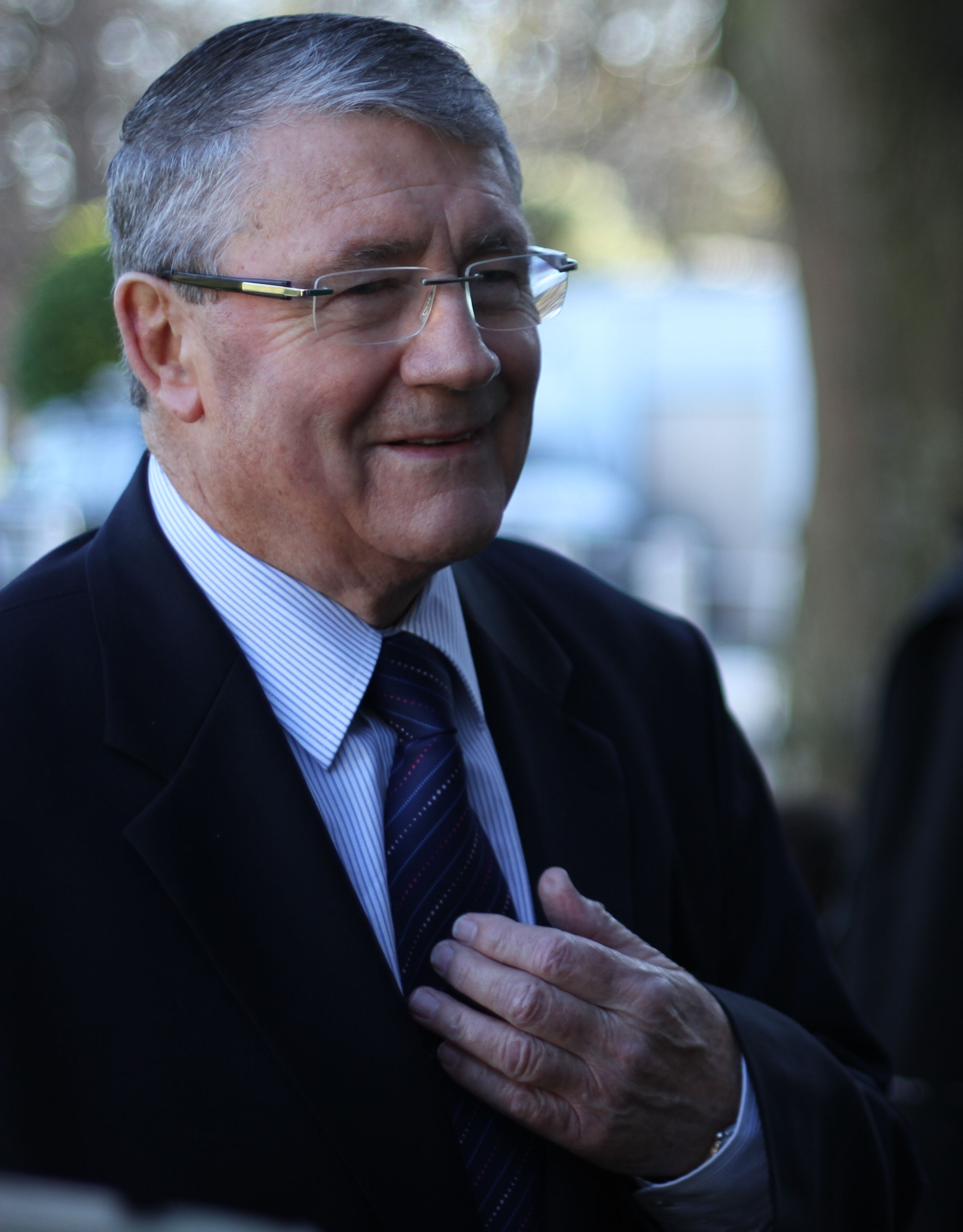
	First party	Second party	Third party
Leader	Jim Bolger	Mike Moore	Jim Anderton
Party	National	Labour	NewLabour
Leader since	26 March 1986	4 September 1990	1 April 1989
Leader's seat	King Country	Christchurch North	Sydenham
Last election	40 seats, 44.02%	57 seats, 47.96%	New party
Seats won	67	29	1
Seat change	▲27	▼28	▲1
Popular vote	872,358	640,915	94,171
Percentage	47.82%	35.14%	5.16%
Swing	▲3.80%	▼12.82%	▲5.16%
- Results by electorate, shaded by winning margin
Prime Minister before election
Mike Moore
Labour
Subsequent Prime Minister
Jim Bolger
National

The 1990 New Zealand general election was held on 27 October to determine the composition of the 43rd New Zealand parliament. The governing Labour Party was defeated in a landslide, ending its two terms in office. The National Party, led by Jim Bolger, won the largest majority government in New Zealand history.

This election was the first time since 1975 that National won the popular vote, even if by taking a plurality but not a majority.

== Background ==
The Labour Party had taken office after defeating the National Party under Robert Muldoon in the 1984 election. David Lange became prime minister and Roger Douglas became Minister of Finance. The economic program outlined by Douglas was deeply unpopular with Labour's traditional supporters, however – deregulation, privatisation, and free trade, all opposed by the party's more left-wing members, were a key part of the Rogernomics platform. This internal dissent was off-set somewhat by new social legislation and a strong stance against nuclear weapons.

Labour was re-elected in the 1987 election with its parliamentary majority untouched, but the internal disputes continued. Eventually Lange forced Douglas to resign in December 1988, but continued destabilisation of his leadership by Douglas had weakened Lange's position such that he resigned eight months later. He was replaced as prime minister by Geoffrey Palmer, but Palmer failed to revive Labour's falling popularity. Several months before the election, Palmer was replaced by Mike Moore. The National Party was performing strongly – its leader, Jim Bolger, spoke repeatedly of "the Decent Society", saying that the reforms were doing significant damage to the social fabric of the country. The government was also being challenged by the NewLabour Party, founded by renegade MP Jim Anderton.

In a study of the 1990 election, political scientists Jack Vowles and Peter Aimer, concluded that Moore's elevation to the leadership did make an impact on voters, particularly those who were still undecided about how they would vote when the campaign began. They stated "The evidence has confirmed the presence of a small electoral effect, consistently in Moore's favour," and that "He attracted some late deciders, probably deterred others from leaving Labour; and those who did leave appeared to do so despite, rather than because of, the leadership change." Moore's performance on the campaign trail narrowed the gap in opinion polls between Labour and National to 10%, better than it had been for over a year.

=== MPs retiring in 1990 ===
Five National MPs and eleven Labour MPs intended to retire at the end of the 42nd Parliament.

Party	Name	Electorate
National	George Gair	North Shore
National	Merv Wellington	Papakura
National	Ian McLean	Tarawera
National	Venn Young	Waitotara
National	Derek Angus	Wallace
Labour	Geoffrey Palmer	Christchurch Central
Labour	Stan Rodger	Dunedin North
Labour	Anne Collins	East Cape
Labour	Trevor Young	Eastern Hutt
Labour	Roger Douglas	Manurewa
Labour	Philip Woollaston	Nelson
Labour	Colin Moyle	Otara
Labour	Trevor de Cleene	Palmerston North
Labour	Bob Tizard	Panmure
Labour	Michael Bassett	Te Atatu
Labour	Russell Marshall	Wanganui

== The election ==
The date for the 1990 election was 27 October. 2,202,157 people were registered to vote, and 85.2% of these people turned out. The number of seats being contested was 97 – this was the same as in the previous election, which had the largest number of seats for any Parliament until that point.

== Results ==
The 1990 election eventually saw a victory for the National Party, then in opposition. National won nearly half (48%) of the vote and 67 (69%) of the seats, becoming the fourth National government. This was the highest number of seats the party had ever won, either in absolute terms or as a percentage, and by extension the largest majority government in New Zealand history. Four new (and young) National MPs: (Bill English, Tony Ryall, Roger Sowry and Nick Smith) were called the "brat pack" by Sir Robert Muldoon (himself one of the "Young Turks" of 1960).

The new Green Party gained the third-highest number of votes, but won no seats. The NewLabour Party won a single seat, due to Jim Anderton retaining the Sydenham seat he originally won as a Labour candidate.

The governing Labour Party, by contrast, suffered its worst-ever defeat since it first won power in the 1935 election, winning only 29 (30%) of the seats and 35% of the vote (its lowest percentage since 1931), and losing 27 seats. Initially it appeared that twelve ministers and the Speaker had lost their seats, but Fran Wilde scraped in on special votes. Many of Labour's talented "class of 84" were swept out, though five of them, Annette King, Jim Sutton, Trevor Mallard, Richard Northey and Judy Keall, returned in 1993.

The result was primarily due to intense anger at Labour and its policies (shown by it losing 12% of the vote) rather than love of National (which only increased its vote by 4%).

== Detailed results ==
=== Party totals ===
Election results
Party	Candidates	Total votes	Percentage	Seats won
National	97	872,358	47.82	67
Labour	97	640,915	35.14	29
Greens	71	124,915	6.85	-
NewLabour	93	94,171	5.16	1
Democrats	91	30,455	1.67	-
Social Credit	68	17,897	0.98	-
Mana Motuhake	4	10,869	0.60	-
McGillicuddy Serious	59	10,058	0.55	-
Christian Heritage	18	9,591	0.53	-
Minor parties and Independents	76	12,863	0.71	-
Total	674	1,824,092		97

=== Votes summary ===
Popular Vote
National	47.82%
Labour	35.14%
Greens	6.85%
NewLabour	5.16%
Democrats	2.02%
Others	3.37%

Parliament seats
National	69.07%
Labour	29.90%
NewLabour	1.03%

=== Electorate results ===
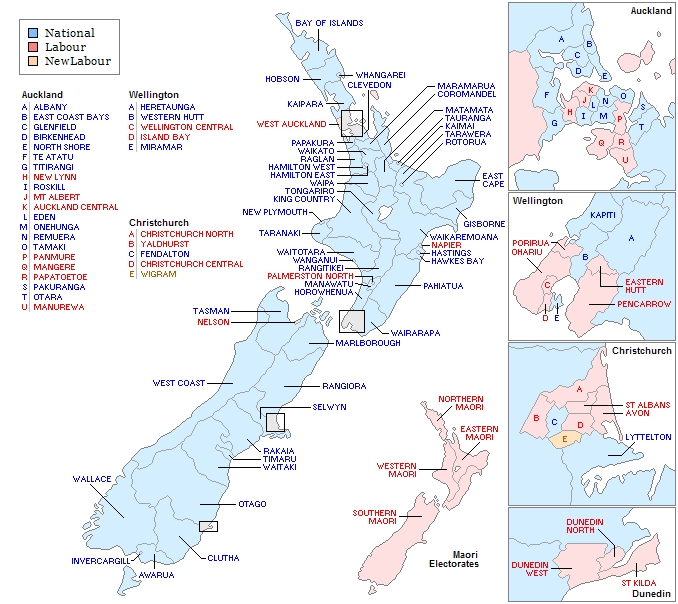

The tables below shows the results of the 1990 general election:

Key

National Labour Democrats NewLabour Mana Motuhake

Electorate results for the 1990 New Zealand general election
Electorate	Incumbent	Winner	Majority	Runner up
General electorates
Albany	Don McKinnon		7,455	June Allen
Ashburton	Jenny Shipley		7,922	Basil Moskovis
Auckland Central	Richard Prebble		3,277	Kathryn Hill
Avon	Larry Sutherland		4,250	Wendy Rush
Awarua	Jeff Grant		4,964	Heather Russell
Bay of Islands	John Carter		5,285	Bruce Raitt
Birkenhead	Jenny Kirk	Ian Revell	2,813	Jenny Kirk
Christchurch Central	Geoffrey Palmer	Lianne Dalziel	3,769	Ross Gluer
Christchurch North	Mike Moore		2,148	Peter Yarrell
Clevedon	Warren Kyd		4,732	Ann Batten
Clutha	Robin Gray		6,527	Jeff Buchanan
Coromandel	Graeme Lee		6,342	Margaret Hawkeswood
Dunedin North	Stan Rodger	Pete Hodgson	2,336	Gael Donoghue
Dunedin West	Clive Matthewson		1,779	Ian McMeeking
East Cape	Anne Collins	Tony Ryall	1,968	Dianne Collins
East Coast Bays	Murray McCully		5,216	Gary Knapp
Eastern Hutt	Trevor Young	Paul Swain	801	Rosemary Thomas
Eden	Richard Northey	Christine Fletcher	1,524	Richard Northey
Fendalton	Philip Burdon		4,993	Tony Day
Gisborne	Allan Wallbank	Wayne Kimber	449	Allan Wallbank
Glenfield	Judy Keall	Peter Hilt	2,958	Judy Keall
Hamilton East	Bill Dillon	Tony Steel	2,121	Bill Dillon
Hamilton West	Trevor Mallard	Grant Thomas	1,563	Trevor Mallard
Hastings	David Butcher	Jeff Whittaker	728	David Butcher
Hawkes Bay	Bill Sutton	Michael Laws	2,895	Bill Sutton
Heretaunga	Bill Jeffries	Peter McCardle	1,122	Bill Jeffries
Hobson	Ross Meurant		6,641	Howard Henry
Horowhenua	Annette King	Hamish Hancock	624	Annette King
Invercargill	Rob Munro		4,137	Barry Rait
Island Bay	Elizabeth Tennet		3,635	Ann Nolan
Kaimai	Robert Anderson		8,147	Gordon Dickson
Kaipara	Lockwood Smith		8,610	Wayne Sellwood
Kapiti	Margaret Shields	Roger Sowry	1,599	Margaret Shields
King Country	Jim Bolger		7,274	Cameron Gordon
Lyttelton	Peter Simpson	Gail McIntosh	68	Peter Simpson
Manawatu	David Robinson	Hamish MacIntyre	3,089	David Robinson
Mangere	David Lange		4,039	Bryan Archer
Manurewa	Roger Douglas	George Hawkins	1,143	Pat Baker
Maramarua	Bill Birch		7,670	Charles Chauvel
Marlborough	Doug Kidd		7,187	Barbara Hutchinson
Matamata	John Luxton		8,501	Bill Pepperell
Miramar	Peter Neilson	Graeme Reeves	552	Peter Neilson
Mt Albert	Helen Clark		1,230	Larry Bellshaw
Napier	Geoff Braybrooke		1,265	Colleen Pritchard
Nelson	Philip Woollaston	John Blincoe	636	Liz Baigent
New Lynn	Jonathan Hunt		1,099	Martyn Athol Bishop
New Plymouth	Harry Duynhoven	John Armstrong	1,701	Harry Duynhoven
North Shore	George Gair	Bruce Cliffe	6,183	Graeme Ransom
Ohariu	Peter Dunne		783	George Mathew
Onehunga	Fred Gerbic	Grahame Thorne	612	Fred Gerbic
Otago	Warren Cooper		3,927	Tony Cooke
Otara	Colin Moyle	Trevor Rogers	1,226	Taito Phillip Field
Pahiatua	John Falloon		7,689	Margo Martindale
Pakuranga	Maurice Williamson		9,086	Paul Charles Grant
Palmerston North	Trevor de Cleene	Steve Maharey	349	Paul Sherriff
Panmure	Bob Tizard	Judith Tizard	1,098	Gray Bartlett
Papakura	Merv Wellington	John Robertson	5,665	James Stubbs
Papatoetoe	Ross Robertson		510	Allan Brewster
Pencarrow	Sonja Davies		384	Ray Wallace
Porirua	Graham Kelly		3,453	Philip Faulkner
Raglan	Simon Upton		5,442	Olivia Scaletti-Longley
Rangiora	Jim Gerard		5,273	Judith Alison McLachlan
Rangitikei	Denis Marshall		6,127	Patricia Barton
Remuera	Doug Graham		7,368	Carl Harding
Roskill	Phil Goff	Gilbert Myles	644	Phil Goff
Rotorua	Paul East		5,270	Bruce Raitt
St Albans	David Caygill		1,560	David Dumergue
St Kilda	Michael Cullen		1,886	Bruce Alexander
Selwyn	Ruth Richardson		5,441	Val Elley
Sydenham	Jim Anderton		1,443	Linda Constable
Tamaki	Robert Muldoon		7,592	Malcolm Johnston
Taranaki	Roger Maxwell		7,867	Scott Dalziel
Tarawera	Ian McLean	Max Bradford	5,152	Malcolm Moore
Tasman	Ken Shirley	Nick Smith	2,246	Ken Shirley
Tauranga	Winston Peters		9,314	Bill Delaney
Te Atatu	Michael Bassett	Brian Neeson	1,370	Dan McCaffrey
Timaru	Maurice McTigue		3,192	Gary Clarke
Titirangi	Ralph Maxwell	Marie Hasler	64	Ralph Maxwell
Tongariro	Noel Scott	Ian Peters	886	Noel Scott
Waikaremoana	Roger McClay		5,865	David Davies
Waikato	Rob Storey		6,172	George Middleton
Waipa	Katherine O'Regan		8,477	Mark Apiata-Wade
Wairarapa	Wyatt Creech		4,141	Pauline Moran
Waitaki	Jim Sutton	Alec Neill	2,905	Jim Sutton
Waitotara	Venn Young	Peter Gresham	7,192	Dominic O'Sullivan
Wallace	Derek Angus	Bill English	8,886	David Soper
Wanganui	Russell Marshall	Cam Campion	409	Jill Pettis
Wellington Central	Fran Wilde		246	Pauline Gardiner (Note: Gardiner was first on election night for Wellington Central, but lost when special votes were included)
West Auckland	Jack Elder		252	Laurie Wicks
West Coast	Kerry Burke	Margaret Moir	2,611	Kerry Burke
Western Hutt	John Terris	Joy Quigley	700	John Terris
Whangarei	John Banks		6,839	Edna Tait
Yaldhurst	Margaret Austin		42	John Connelly
Māori electorates
Eastern Maori	Peter Tapsell		6,844	Wi Kuki Kaa
Northern Maori	Bruce Gregory		956	Matiu Rata
Southern Maori	Whetu Tirikatene-Sullivan		7,614	Tikirau Stevens
Western Maori	Koro Wētere		5,466	Eva Rickard

Table footnotes:

=== Summary of seat changes ===
- Electoral redistributions:
  - There was no redistribution of electoral boundaries between the 1987 and 1990 elections.
- Seats captured:
  - By National: Birkenhead, East Cape, Eden, Gisborne, Glenfield, Hamilton East, Hamilton West, Hastings, Hawkes Bay, Heretaunga, Horowhenua, Kapiti, Lyttelton, Manawatu, Miramar, New Plymouth, Onehunga, Otara, Roskill, Tasman, Te Atatu, Titirangi, Tongariro, Waitaki, Wanganui, West Coast and Western Hutt (27 seats) were captured from Labour. Seventeen of these (Gisborne, Hamilton East, Hamilton West, Hastings, Horowhenua, Lyttelton, Manawatu, Miramar, New Plymouth, Onehunga, Otara, Roskill, Te Atatu, Titirangi, Tongariro, Wanganui & the West Coast) were one-term gains, recaptured by Labour in 1993.
- Seats transferred from departing MPs to new MPs:
  - The seats of North Shore, Papakura, Tarawera, Waitotara and Wallace, all held by departing National MPs, were won by new National candidates.
  - The seats of Christchurch Central, Dunedin North, Eastern Hutt, Manurewa, Nelson, Palmerston North and Panmure, all held by departing Labour MPs, were won by new Labour candidates.

== Post-election events ==
A number of local by-elections were required due to the resignation of incumbent local body politicians following their election to Parliament:

- A by-election to the Auckland City Council was caused after Maungakiekie Ward councillor Grahame Thorne resigned his seat after he was elected MP for Onehunga, necessitating a by-election to fill the council vacancy. The by-election was won by Ken Graham with two candidates from the general election, Richard Northey (Labour candidate for Eden) and Laurie Ross (Green candidate for Onehunga), also contesting.
- A by-election to the Auckland Regional Council was caused after Panmure Ward councillor Judith Tizard resigned her seat after she was elected MP for Panmure, necessitating a by-election to fill the council vacancy. The by-election was won by Bruce Jesson with a retiring candidate at the general election, Bob Tizard (previously Labour MP for Panmure) also contesting.
- A by-election to the Wellington City Council was caused after Southern Ward councillor John Blincoe resigned his seat after he was elected MP for Nelson, necessitating a by-election to fill the council vacancy. The by-election was won by Margaret Bonner with two candidates from the general election, Ann Nolan (National candidate for Island Bay) and Jeff Montgomery (NewLabour candidate for Wellington Central), also contesting.
