= Lemauga Lydia Sosene =

New Zealand Labour Party politician

Lemauga Lydia Sosene MP
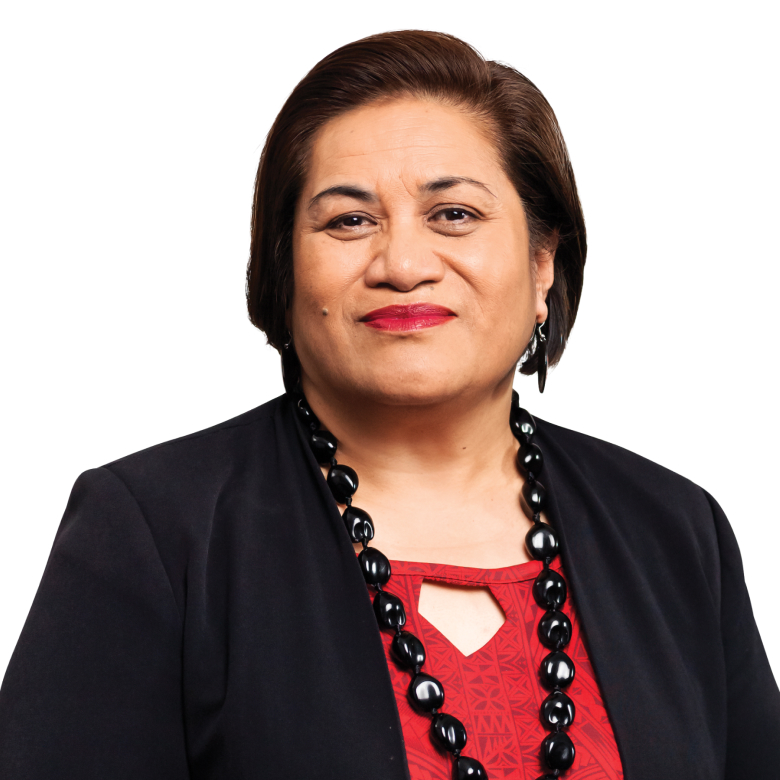
- Sosene in 2023

Member of the New Zealand Parliament for Māngere
- Incumbent
- Assumed office 14 October 2023
- Preceded by: William Sio
- Majority: 8,385

Member of the New Zealand Parliament for Labour party list
- In office 2 May 2022 – 14 October 2023
- Preceded by: Louisa Wall

Personal details
- Born: 14 April 1965 (age 61) Auckland, New Zealand
- Party: Labour
- Spouse: Afoataga Sosene

Lemauga Lydia Sosene (born 14 April 1965) is a New Zealand Labour Party politician. She was a member of the Māngere-Ōtāhuhu local board from the October 2010 local elections until her election to the New Zealand House of Representatives in May 2022. After completing the balance of Louisa Wall's term as a list MP, Sosene was elected as MP for Māngere at the 2023 general election.

== Personal life ==
Sosene's parents both emigrated from Samoa to New Zealand in the 1950s. Her father was a founding minister of the Congregational Christian Church in Samoa (EFKS) in Ōtara. Sosene was born in South Auckland in 1965, where she grew up. At some point, her family lived in Henderson in West Auckland. Married to Afoataga Sosene, they live in Favona.

== Political career ==
=== Local government ===
Sosene joined the Labour Party in 2000. She was first elected to the Māngere-Ōtāhuhu local board in the 2010 local elections. She was re-elected in the 2013 local elections and 2016 local elections. The board elected her chair in 2013 and returned her to that position in 2016 and 2019. In her role as chair of the board, Sosene has spoken about the impact of overcrowded housing on Pasifika, and the benefit to Samoans in Auckland of a rise in the minimum wage. She supported the extension of Auckland light rail through the Māngere town centre. She resigned from the board in May 2022, following her election to Parliament.

=== Member of Parliament ===
New Zealand Parliament
Years	Term	Electorate	List	Party
2022–2023	53rd	List	54	Labour
2023–2026	54th	Māngere	53	Labour
2026–present	55th	Māngere	46	Labour

At the 2017 general election, Sosene was a list-only candidate placed 44th on the Labour Party list. Labour did not win sufficient representation for Sosene to be elected.

At the 2020 general election, Sosene was again a list only candidate for the Labour Party, ranked 54th. Although Labour won more than 63 seats, the election of twelve lower-ranked or unranked constituency candidates prevented Sosene's election at that time; however, she was still invited to participate in the new MP induction process while waiting for the special votes to be counted. She was the highest-ranked Labour list candidate who was not elected at the general election, but she was sworn in as a Member of Parliament on 2 May 2022, following the resignation of list MP Louisa Wall.

In 2023, Sosene won the Labour nomination for the safe Labour seat of Māngere, succeeding Aupito William Sio who retired. On 14 October, she won the seat by a margin of 11,712 votes over National's Rosemary Bourke.

On 30 November 2023, Sosene was appointed as spokesperson for Internal Affairs, associate Pacific Peoples, and associate Social Development and Employment in the Shadow Cabinet of Chris Hipkins.

On 7 March 2025, Sosene gained the statistics portfolio but retained the internal affairs portfolio during a shadow cabinet reshuffle. She lost the associate Pacific Peoples, social development and employment portfolios.

During the 2026 New Zealand general election, Sosene contested the Māngere for Labour. She was ranked 41st on the Labour Party list. Based on preliminary results, Sosene retained Māngere by a landslide margin of 11,970 votes.
