= Colin Moyle =

New Zealand politician (1929–2024)

The Honourable Colin Moyle CBE
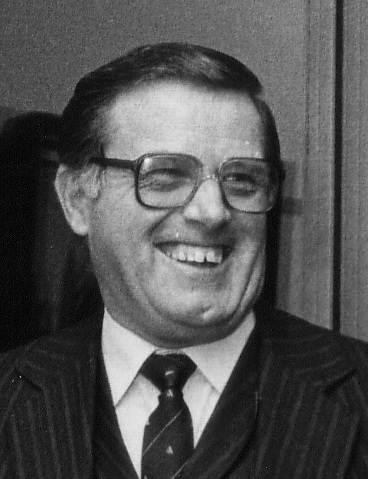
- Moyle in 1985

26th Minister of Agriculture
- In office 26 July 1984 – 9 February 1990
- Prime Minister: David Lange; Geoffrey Palmer
- Preceded by: Duncan MacIntyre
- Succeeded by: Jim Sutton

3rd Minister of Fisheries
- In office 26 July 1984 – 9 February 1990
- Prime Minister: David Lange; Geoffrey Palmer
- Preceded by: Duncan MacIntyre
- Succeeded by: Ken Shirley

Member of the New Zealand Parliament for Otara Hunua (1981–1984)
- In office 28 November 1981 – 27 October 1990
- Preceded by: Winston Peters
- Succeeded by: Trevor Rogers

26th Minister of Agriculture and Fisheries
- In office 8 December 1972 – 12 December 1975
- Prime Minister: Norman Kirk; Bill Rowling
- Preceded by: Douglas Carter
- Succeeded by: Duncan MacIntyre

18th Minister of Forestry
- In office 8 December 1972 – 12 December 1975
- Prime Minister: Norman Kirk; Bill Rowling
- Preceded by: Duncan MacIntyre
- Succeeded by: Venn Young

14th Minister for Science
- In office 8 December 1972 – 12 December 1975
- Prime Minister: Norman Kirk; Bill Rowling
- Preceded by: Les Gandar
- Succeeded by: Les Gandar

Member of the New Zealand Parliament for Mangere
- In office 29 November 1969 – 24 December 1976
- Preceded by: New electorate
- Succeeded by: David Lange

Member of the New Zealand Parliament for Manukau
- In office 30 November 1963 – 29 November 1969
- Preceded by: Leon Götz
- Succeeded by: Roger Douglas

Personal details
- Born: Colin James Moyle; 18 June 1929 Thames, New Zealand
- Died: 11 May 2024 (aged 94)
- Party: Labour
- Spouse: Millicent Chapman (m. 1952)
- Children: 3
- Education: University of Auckland

Colin James Moyle CBE (18 July 1929 – 11 May 2024) was a New Zealand politician. A member of the Labour Party, he served as a Member of Parliament (MP) from 1963 to 1976 and again from 1981 to 1990. He was a Government minister in the Third Labour and Fourth Labour Governments. He was a close confidant of Bill Rowling during Rowling's short premiership. In the Fourth Labour Government, as Minister of Agriculture, Moyle oversaw the removal of farming subsidies and the establishment of a fisheries quota system.

In late 1976, Prime Minister Robert Muldoon accused Moyle in Parliament of having been questioned by the police on suspicion of homosexual activities, which were then illegal in New Zealand. After changing his story several times, Moyle resigned from Parliament, although he was re-elected four years later. Muldoon may have viewed Moyle as a future Labour leader and potential rival, and sought to discredit him.

== Early and personal life ==
Moyle was born on 18 July 1929 in Thames. His parents were both teachers so he had an itinerant childhood travelling around the Thames, Rotorua and Bay of Islands districts. He went to high school first in Kaikohe and later in Kawakawa followed by one year at Auckland Grammar School. He then attended university at Auckland Teachers College, leaving just short of earning a full degree. In 1950 he got his first teaching job and in 1952 he married Adelaide Millicent Chapman with whom he had two daughters and one son.

Aged 23 and newly married, Moyle returned to the far north and took over a rough farm in Hokianga next to his parents-in-law's property. He broke in the land and created a dairy farm large enough to accommodate 50 cows. He had no tractor and after milking the cows he had to carry the cans of milk in cans tied to a yoke on his back. He also augmented his income by winching out "sinkers" (logs of kauri wood) that had disappeared underneath semi-reclaimed mangrove swamps. Additionally he later farmed sheep as well. As well as being a farmer he taught full-time during the day as a secondary school teacher at Okaihau College. As well as teaching there he drove the school bus on its 59-mile route every day. He eventually gave up his farm, selling it to his neighbouring father-in-law, as part of an amalgamation deal in order to move to Whangārei for a teaching job.

Moyle joined the Labour Party as a teenager and while still in sixth form was a campaign volunteer for Hugh Watt in the Onehunga electorate. He attended University of Auckland and was a member of the university's socialist club alongside other future Labour MPs Martyn Finlay and Bob Tizard. After moving to Hokianga in 1952 he founded the Labour Party's branch there at the same time that a nearby friend (future Prime Minister Bill Rowling) founded a branch in Hobson. Moyle was then president of the Hobson Labour Representation Committee for two years. He then became secretary of the Labour Party's Regional Advisory Committee and from 1959 a national organiser for the party. He also helped organise the publishing of the party newspaper The Statesman which had a circulation of 100,000 at its peak.

Moyle was a convert to Roman Catholicism.

== Member of Parliament ==
New Zealand Parliament
| Years | Term | Electorate | Party |
|---|---|---|---|
| 1963–1966 | 34th | Manukau | Labour |
| 1966–1969 | 35th | Manukau | Labour |
| 1969–1972 | 36th | Mangere | Labour |
| 1972–1975 | 37th | Mangere | Labour |
| 1975–1976 | 38th | Mangere | Labour |
| 1981–1984 | 40th | Hunua | Labour |
| 1984–1987 | 41st | Otara | Labour |
| 1987–1990 | 42nd | Otara | Labour |

=== MP and Minister, 1963–75 ===
Moyle stood unsuccessfully for the Hobson electorate in 1957.

He was elected to the House of Representatives in the 1963 general election, as a Labour MP for the South Auckland electorate of Manukau. In 1969 the Mangere electorate was created in the same general area, and Moyle moved his candidacy there, allowing Roger Douglas to take over Manukau. Moyle was elected for Mangere in the 1969 election, and would hold the electorate for another eight years. He was soon appointed to the Shadow Cabinet as Shadow Minister of Agriculture and Lands. He was one of the main campaign organisers for Labour at the 1969 election where he suggested a strategy of focusing attention on new seats as well as marginal ones. This saw an increase in both votes and seats, but Labour was narrowly defeated.

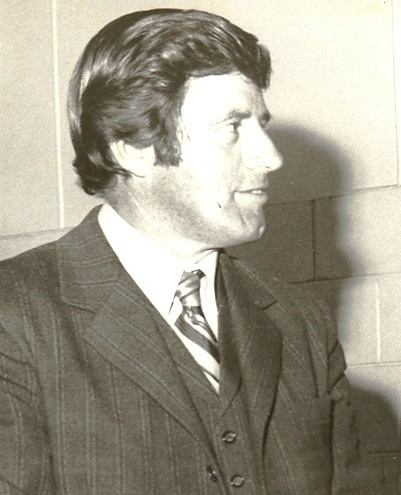
Moyle in 1972

In the 1972 general election, the Labour Party came to power for the first time in over a decade, forming the Third Labour Government led by Norman Kirk. Moyle was appointed to the Ministerial positions of Agriculture and Fisheries, Forests, and Science. In September 1975 he also became Minister responsible for the newly formed Rural Banking and Finance Corporation. The corporation was created in April 1974 by separating the rural division of the extant State Advances Corporation into its own entity and expanding its role in farming finance (which Labour had promised to do in its 1972 manifesto). It was also a response to banks charging farmers high interest rates on loans which were hindering agricultural development. The government also cut several farming subsidies for pesticides, stock drenches and aerial application of lime and fertiliser a net budget saving of $17.4 million.

He was generally well-regarded, especially as Minister of Agriculture. He was "enduringly popular with the farming community", and was instrumental in opening up New Zealand's meat trade with the Middle East. He travelled overseas frequently (often alongside overseas trade minister Joe Walding) to many countries, particularly Iran, Russia and China, to open more export markets for New Zealand's primary produce to replace the diminishing quotas for those products in Britain following their membership of the European Economic Community.

His main goals in the agriculture portfolio was to oversee Labour's campaign commitments to achieve better cost stability for farmers and to convert bulk-commodity-based farming practices to become more market-oriented. He failed to convince Kirk to float the New Zealand dollar so that farmers could get a true return on the value of their produce. Kirk dismissed the idea, concerned that it would increase inflation, which Moyle acknowledged but thought that inflationary impacts would be less than the returns on stimulated economic growth.

His implementation of the government policies saw a rise in profitability of both beef, wool and butterfat exports and countered the opposition National Party's claims that the Labour Party didn't understand farming. Moyle stated he was told by a farmer that it helped that he belonged to a party where he was the only farmer-politician whereas the National Party was "full of them and each one had a different opinion as to where the country should go with its agriculture". As Minister of Forests, Moyle also helped preserve the remaining stands of giant kauri.

In August 1974, Kirk died suddenly, and Bill Rowling took over as Prime Minister and Labour Party leader. He stood for the position of deputy to Bill Rowling in 1974 after Hugh Watt decided not to stand again. He was eliminated on the second ballot with Bob Tizard winning on the fourth ballot. Moyle supported Rowling for the leadership and worked around the caucus to secure votes for his election. He subsequently rose in the cabinet ranking and was awarded with a seat on the frontbench by Rowling. He thought his main failure was failing to convince Rowling to hold a snap election in October 1974 which he was convinced Labour would have won with the loss of only one or two seats. Due to his decades long friendship with Rowling his influence in the cabinet grew. He had more luck persuading Rowling of the merits of currency valuation with regards to exporters than he had done previously with Kirk. While the dollar was not fully floated, the New Zealand dollar was devalued by 15% in August 1975 to assist local manufacturers and exporters.

=== Opposition and the 'Moyle Affair' ===
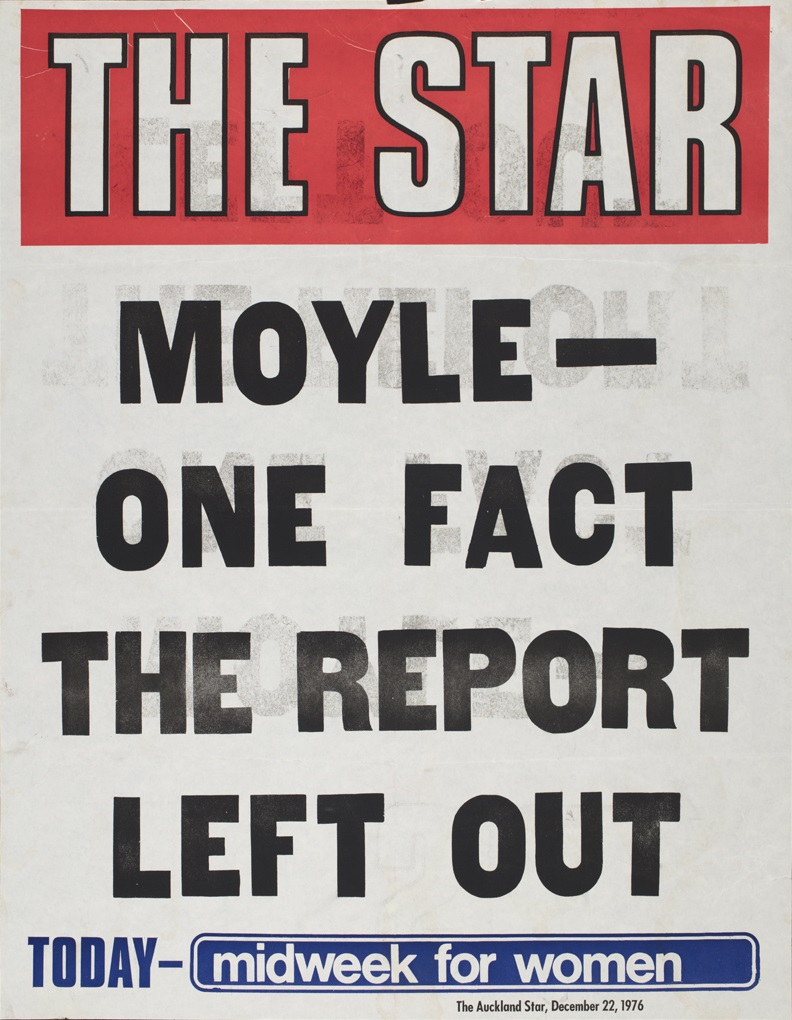
The Moyle Affair captured national headlines for months

Labour unexpectedly lost power in the 1975 general election, bringing to power the Third National Government led by Robert Muldoon. Moyle remained on the frontbench and was appointed Shadow Minister of Agriculture and Shadow Minister of Science & Technology by Rowling. Many within Labour were dissatisfied with their party's performance under Rowling, and began a campaign to replace him. According to political commentator Bruce Jesson, Moyle was the preferred candidate due to his strong performance as Minister of Agriculture. However any potential leadership coup was derailed due to what became known as the 'Moyle Affair' of 1976.

During an exchange on an un-related matter in a parliamentary debate, Muldoon brusquely commented on Moyle's "effeminate" giggle (although Muldoon may in fact have heard MP Frank Rogers imitating Muldoon's famous cackle). The Prime Minister then alleged that Moyle had been questioned by the police on suspicion of homosexual activities (which were then illegal) in Wellington. When this matter came to Rowling's attention, Moyle was questioned by Rowling and changed his story several times. Upon this basis, Moyle resigned from Parliament. He later said that he had not been obliged to resign, but had done so because "the whole thing just made me sick". It has been suggested that Muldoon saw him as a leadership threat and acted accordingly. Moyle agreed with this assertion, stating in 1989; "In a sense of straight political astuteness I was perceived in those days as one of the up and coming members of the Labour Party and to destroy me was to strike a considerable blow against the chances of the Labour government coming back. And I guess if one talks about the politics of denigration, which I think reached their nadir at that time, they were remarkably successful."

The so-called 'Moyle Affair' dominated the newspaper headlines, and became a rallying point for the nascent gay liberation movement in New Zealand, which bemoaned that the mere accusation of homosexuality could end a career.

Initially Moyle intended to stand for re-election to vindicate himself of the allegations, but withdrew his name from the nominations only three days before the selection meeting. Ironically, the subsequent 1977 by-election was won by David Lange, and the attention that this got him helped propel him to the leadership of the Labour Party and his landslide victory over Muldoon in the 1984 election. In a 1990 interview, Moyle said that the scandal had made him a "sadder and wiser person".

Moyle then turned his attention to nominating for the nearby seat of Papatoetoe, which was newly created and incorporated parts of Mangere. He garnered much local support but the selection resulted in a deadlock between himself and former Eden MP Mike Moore. He then put his name forward for another new seat in south Auckland electorate, Hunua, but lost to Malcolm Douglas. In the 1978 election, Moyle stood for and failed to win the Whangarei electorate. In between his spells in Parliament he returned to farming. In the lead up to the 1978 election Moyle had been working for Labour as the party's policy coordinator. After failing to get elected in Whangarei that year, he declared his candidacy for the Labour Party presidency at the 1979 party conference. Two and a half months later, he announced he had withdrawn his name from the race stating that he was happy with the calibre of the other declared candidates.

=== Re-election and new Ministerial career ===
In the 1981 election, Moyle stood for and won the Hunua electorate. This was abolished before the 1984 election, and Moyle stood for, and won, the new electorate of Otara, which he held until his retirement in 1990. He gained admiration for his courage in re-entering politics especially as Muldoon was still Prime Minister upon his return. Soon after his return to Parliament he was returned to the Shadow Cabinet in February 1982, becoming Shadow Minister of Overseas Trade and Shadow Minister of Rural Banking. Later that year Rowling informed Moyle that he intended to resign the leadership, before he announced publicly. Moyle, who had previously been seen as leadership potential in the 1970s, decided to attempt to campaign for the leadership. Moyle attempted to rally Rowling's supporters at a meeting in Auckland in early 1983, though attendance was low. He took this as a sign and then informed the deputy leader, David Lange, he would not stand on assurances Lange was healthy enough for the job (being mindful of Norman Kirk's health deterioration a decade earlier) but Lange said he was fighting fit. When Lange duly replaced Rowling as leader he appointed Moyle as Shadow Minister of Agriculture once again.

In 1984 Labour was again returned to power, forming the Fourth Labour Government under David Lange. As one of the few Labour MPs with Ministerial experience, Moyle was reappointed to Cabinet, again holding the portfolios of Agriculture and Fisheries (now separate departments) and regaining charge of the Rural Banking and Finance Corporation. The government's policy was market liberal and reformist. Driven by Finance Minister Roger Douglas, it embarked on a programme, known as Rogernomics, aimed at deregulating the economy. Moyle's portfolio of Agriculture was strongly affected by this, as the farming sector had been one of New Zealand's most heavily subsidised. In the 1982–83 financial year, for example, it has been estimated that farm subsidies cost "well over" a billion New Zealand dollars. Under the Fourth Labour Government, virtually all state financial assistance was removed from agriculture. This included the Rural Banking and Finance Corporation which Moyle had established ten years earlier, which Douglas sold to private enterprise. Moyle was a supporter of the reforms, but was not associated with them to the same extent as many of his colleagues despite their effect on his portfolio. During this time Moyle was never afraid to front up to decisions and during the painful restructuring of the farming industry he turned up at public meetings even when opposition to decisions reached the point of fists being shaken in his face. The government also floated the New Zealand dollar in March 1985, something he had advocated for over a decade earlier.

The fishing industry was also overhauled at this time. In particular, a Quota Management System was introduced in order to manage the country's fishing stocks. Because this initially made little provision for traditional or other Māori fishing rights, it was challenged by the Waitangi Tribunal and several iwi. Under Moyle, a Maori Fisheries Act was introduced to deal with this, recognising Māori rights to a share of fisheries and the fishing industry. He also supported the New Zealand Wool Board in its expansion into conducting commercial activities, albeit whilst continuing with their regulatory functions as well. Earlier in December 1972 he had encouraged this during the third Labour Government, but the Wool Board had been restricted by new regulations passed in February 1978 by the Muldoon Government.

Although involved in several important reforms, Moyle had a low profile in the government, avoiding publicity. At the 1987 election he had announced that he would probably retire from Parliament at the 1990 election, and in 1989 he confirmed this. Along with other Ministers who had announced their retirement, Moyle was dropped from Cabinet by Prime Minister Geoffrey Palmer in early 1990. He had wanted to keep his Ministerial position until that year's election in order to complete the restructuring of the meat industry.

In the 1990 Queen's Birthday Honours, Moyle was appointed a Commander of the Order of the British Empire, for public services. Also in 1990, he received the New Zealand 1990 Commemoration Medal.

== Life after politics ==
Moyle retired to a 300-hectare (740-acre) sheep and cattle farm at Waimate North in the Bay of Islands with his wife Millicent and son Greg, who was his co-farmer.

During the 2015 Northland by-election Moyle voted for Winston Peters, whom he defeated in Hūnua in 1981; it was the first time in his life he had not voted for Labour. For the by-election Labour did not oppose strategic voting, preferring Peters win than the National Party candidate.

Moyle died on 11 May 2024, at the age of 94.

== Notes ==
Political offices
| Preceded by Duncan MacIntyre | Minister of Fisheries; 1984–1990 | Succeeded by Ken Shirley |
| Preceded by Duncan MacIntyre | Minister of Agriculture; 1984–1990 1972–1975 | Succeeded by Jim Sutton |
| Preceded by Douglas Carter | Minister of Agriculture; 1984–1990 1972–1975 | Succeeded by Duncan MacIntyre |
| Preceded by Duncan MacIntyre | Minister of Forestry; 1972–1975 | Succeeded by Venn Young |
| Preceded by Les Gandar | Minister for Science; 1972–1975 | Succeeded by Les Gandar |
New Zealand Parliament
| Preceded by Leon Götz | Member of Parliament for Manukau; 1963–1969 | Succeeded by Roger Douglas |
| New constituency | Member of Parliament for Mangere; 1969–1977 | Succeeded by David Lange |
| Preceded by Winston Peters | Member of Parliament for Hunua; 1981–1984 | Vacant Constituency abolished, recreated in 1996 Title next held by Warren Kyd |
| New constituency | Member of Parliament for Otara; 1984–1990 | Succeeded by Trevor Rogers |
