= Glenfield (electorate) =

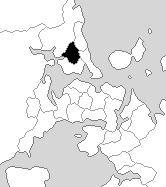
Glenfield electorate boundaries between 1993 and 1996

Glenfield was a New Zealand parliamentary electorate for four terms, from 1984 to 1996. It was represented by two members of parliament, first Judy Keall of the Labour Party, and then Peter Hilt of the National Party. Hilt defected to United New Zealand in 1995.

== Population centres ==
The 1981 census had shown that the North Island had experienced further population growth, and three additional general seats were created through the 1983 electoral redistribution, bringing the total number of electorates to 95. The South Island had, for the first time, experienced a population loss, but its number of general electorates was fixed at 25 since the 1967 electoral redistribution. More of the South Island population was moving to Christchurch, and two electorates were abolished, while two electorates were recreated. In the North Island, six electorates were newly created (including Glenfield), three electorates were recreated, and six electorates were abolished. These changes came into effect with the 1984 election.

This suburban electorate was on the North Shore of Auckland.

== History ==
Labour's Judy Keall was the electorate's first representative in 1984. She was confirmed in the 1987 election, but was beaten by Peter Hilt of the National Party in the 1990 election. In the 1993 election, Hilt defeated Labour's Ann Batten, with Grant Gillon of the Alliance polling strongly in third place. Hilt defected to United New Zealand in 1995.

The electorate was abolished in the 1996 election, the first mixed-member proportional (MMP) election. It was absorbed into the Northcote electorate.

=== Members of Parliament ===
Key

Labour National United NZ

Election	Winner
1984 election	Judy Keall
1987 election	Judy Keall
1990 election	Peter Hilt
1993 election	Peter Hilt
(Electorate abolished in 1996; see Northcote)

== Election results ==
=== 1993 election ===
1993 general election: Glenfield
Party	Candidate	Votes	%	±%
National	Peter Hilt	8,114	38.51	−10.79
Labour	Ann Batten	6,131	29.09	
Alliance	Grant Gillon	4,922	23.36	
NZ First	Clive Mortenson	1,475	7.00	
Christian Heritage	David Thomas	347	1.64	
Natural Law	Carol Cornaga	80	0.37	
Majority		1,983	9.41	−4.89
Turnout		21,069	85.05	−0.69
Registered electors		24,771		

=== 1990 election ===
1990 general election: Glenfield
Party	Candidate	Votes	%	±%
National	Peter Hilt	10,194	49.30	
Labour	Judy Keall	7,326	35.43	−17.86
Green	Ruth Norman	1,831	8.85	
NewLabour	Gilbert John Gurney	940	4.54	
Democrats	Alan John Efford	319	1.54	
McGillicuddy Serious	Derek James Alston	118	0.57	
NZ Party	Ian Sampson	38	0.18	−0.53
Majority		2,958	14.30	
Turnout		20,676	85.74	−3.32
Registered electors		24,114		

=== 1987 election ===
1987 general election: Glenfield
Party	Candidate	Votes	%	±%
Labour	Judy Keall	10,953	53.29	+11.26
National	David Schnauer	9,053	44.04	+5.85
Democrats	A F Weston	400	1.94	
NZ Party	Ian Sampson	146	0.71	
Majority		1,900	9.24	+5.41
Turnout		20,552	89.06	−4.39
Registered electors		23,076		

=== 1984 election ===
1984 general election: Glenfield
Party	Candidate	Votes	%	±%
Labour	Judy Keall	8,857	42.03	
National	David Schnauer	8,048	38.19	
NZ Party	Geoffrey Allan West	2,433	11.54	
Social Credit	Lee Trubshoe	1,734	8.22	
Majority		809	3.83	
Turnout		21,072	93.45	
Registered electors		22,548		
