= Ross Meurant =

New Zealand public figure

Alan Ross Meurant (born 26 August 1947) is a New Zealand public figure, now Honorary Consul for Morocco, who has at various times gained public attention as a police officer, businessman, politician, and political lobbyist.

== Early life and family ==
Meurant was born on 26 August 1947 at Te Kōpuru, the son of Rae-Ola Dalice Meurant (née Olsen) and Edward Alan Meurant. He was educated at Dargaville High School. In 1973, he married Patricia Ann Lewis, and the couple had two children before separating.

== Police ==
Meurant served in the New Zealand Police between 1966 and 1987. In 1975 he was promoted to Sergeant at Takapuna on the North Shore, married Patricia and purchased a home. He had his first pangs to be a Member of Parliament, and as he decided he needed more education to enter political life he enrolled for a BA degree intending to major in political studies. After 2½ years he went back to Auckland Central as Senior Sergeant. He spent eight years at the University of Auckland, finishing a BA in 1982, and starting a law degree, though he then left to pursue business interests in his last years in the police.

He was a detective in the CIB between 1970 and 1975, having worked on the famous case of the murders of Harvey and Jeannette Crewe, helping in the search for cartridge cases, and a member of the Armed Offenders Squad. During the controversial 1981 South Africa rugby union tour of New Zealand, he was second-in-command of one of the riot units, Red Squad. He subsequently wrote a book about the experience of Red Squad: The Red Squad Story. The book was a bestseller in both New Zealand and South Africa.

When Meurant was transferred to night shift work in 1982 after (he says) offending some senior officers he had criticised in his book The Red Squad Story, he studied at night to complete his BA degree and start a law degree. He also started dabbling in business opportunities by running a private security firm from the watchhouse, with his wife as principal partner, and employing up to 70 people. After being commissioned in 1985, he served in various roles including Inspector in charge of the Auckland police criminal intelligence unit. In 1989 he published an autobiography: The Beat to the Beehive.

In 1980, Meurant received the New Zealand Police Long Service and Good Conduct Medal.

== Member of Parliament ==
New Zealand Parliament
Years	Term	Electorate	Party
1987–1990	42nd	Hobson	National
1990–1993	43rd	Hobson	National
1993–1994	44th	Hobson	National
1994–1996	Changed allegiance to:		Conservatives
1996	Changed allegiance to:		Independent

Meurant stood as the National Party candidate for Hobson in the 1987 election. He was successful and went on to serve 3 parliamentary terms. In 1996, his electorate was abolished when the introduction of the MMP proportional voting replaced the FPTP system. Faced with being a list MP, Meurant chose instead to form a new political party and had the distinction of being the first person to register a political party under the new regime.

In 1990, Meurant was awarded the New Zealand 1990 Commemoration Medal.

=== Conservative Party ===
After quitting the National Party, Meurant established a new party known as Right of Centre (later rebranded as the New Zealand Conservative Party). This party was based on his right-wing economic philosophy: selling government assets and reducing government involvement in business. On 7 September 1994, Meurant entered into a formal agreement with Prime Minister Jim Bolger. At that time, Meurant was a member of the executive: the Undersecretary of Agriculture and Forestry. After forming his own party, Meurant retained his executive office and continued to be a member of the Cabinet Committees for Commerce, Industry and Environment and Treaty Issues. Support of government on confidence and supply was central to Meurant's continuation as a member of The Executive.

In August 1995, Meurant refused to comply with a directive from the Prime Minister to relinquish a position that he had as a director of a Russian-owned bank (PROK) domiciled in Vanuatu and was subsequently dismissed from the Executive. Meurant nevertheless continued as a coalition partner of the government as his support at the time was critical to its survival.

Meurant completed a Master of Public Policy at Victoria University of Wellington during his third term in parliament. Contrary to the public perception of him being conservative, while an MP, he voted for gay rights and abortion on demand and also voted against the death penalty. He was also very liberal in regard to drug policy. In his autobiography he wrote: "Perhaps we may liken drug prohibition to the era of liquor prohibition in America ... which created an underworld whose legacy lingers today. If drug use was legal in this country would there be any significant increase in drug use? I think not. Perhaps 50 percent of all crime in New Zealand is drug related. Think of the police resources we would save if we didn’t have to contend with all this drug-related crime. If it was legal to obtain and use drugs in this country, perhaps we could spend the money saved in policing expenditure, running educative programmes and medical clinics to assist those who lack the strength to resist temptation. If drugs such as cannabis and heroin were available through government dispensing stores, perhaps the black market trade which stimulates all this drug-relate trade would recede."

== After leaving parliament ==
After leaving Parliament, Meurant was elected onto the Rodney District Council in 1998. However, his time with the Rodney District Council was short-lived: the entire council was dissolved by the Minister of Local Government after an acrimonious relationship between the general manager and Meurant culminated in a split within the council.

Between 1999 and 2004 Meurant was engaged by parliamentary services as a part-time adviser on agriculture, forestry, fishing and racing taxation policy to Winston Peters, leader of New Zealand First. During this period Meurant was a shareholding director of Digital Global Maps Limited, in which the principal shareholder was Vela Fishing. He also co-owned a thoroughbred horse agistment facility.

In 2002, Meurant was convicted of impersonating police, common assault and inconsiderate driving following an altercation with a truck driver on the Desert Road.

His business relationship with Philip Vela (Vela Fishing) as a director of Digital Global Maps Ltd and as a consultant to Peter Simunovich (Simunovich Fishing) ensured a high public profile. By the early 21st century, he was catapulted into national headlines during the "Scampi scandal" (2003–2009), which included allegations ranging from misreporting of fish catch totals by fishing companies as a mechanism to qualify for bigger allocations of privatised fish assets to allegations of large sums of money being directed from fishing magnates to Winston Peters by Meurant. In 2003 the Primary Industries Select Committee conducted an enquiry into allegations of impropriety involving the principals of Simunovich Fisheries Ltd, Winston Peters and Meurant. After an extensive investigation the allegations were rejected as unfounded and untrue. Contemporaneously, defamation proceedings against TVNZ and The New Zealand Herald were commenced by Simunovich Fisheries. In December 2009 the defendants capitulated and apologised, and reportedly settled for $15 million damages payment. During the 2008 general election Meurant was linked to large donations allegedly transferred from Vela Fishing and other magnates to New Zealand First – the political Party led by Winston Peters, a former National Party colleague of Meurant.

In November 2012, Meurant was elected to the inaugural board of Focus NZ, as Vice-President, a New Zealand list-only political party aimed at the rural sector and primary industry producers and exporters.

2013 Published two novels based on real life: The Syrian Connection – which exposes American interference in transfer of money for non-sanctioned exports and how a Kiwi and Russian KGB agent subverted the blockade. Sex, Power & Politics draws on the author's exposure to a culture in New Zealand parliament.

In July 2016, Meurant was appointed Honorary Consul for the Kingdom of Morocco at the Honorary Consulate office in Auckland, New Zealand.

In February 2018, he was elected to the Electorate Executive Committee of Hon Judith Collins, NZ National Party Member of Parliament. He travelled to the Southern Provinces of Morocco Western Sahara with Collins' husband to look at business opportunities. He was a member of the Executive for 12 months, deciding not to stand for re-selection in 2019. Meurant also decided not to renew his National Party membership at the same time.

Meurant stood for the Gisborne mayoralty in the 2019 New Zealand local elections. Of the three candidates, he came last.

In March 2020, Meurant launched his third novel: "Out of the Inferno". It's about how the adult lives of three childhood friends collide: one becomes a ruthless detective inspector; another a corrupt politician and the third, a gang member.

During the COVID-19 pandemic in New Zealand, Meurant joined several businessmen and former politicians including former National and ACT leader Don Brash in establishing a company called Covax-NZR Limited to import Russia's untested Gam-COVID-Vac (also known as Sputnik V) vaccine into the country. By late August 2020, they had submitted paperwork through the Russian Embassy to establish supply and distribution arrangements to import the vaccine.

In July 2026 Meurant took the role of senior policy adviser to the resurrected Conservatives NZ political party. In October 2026 this position was made redundant.

== Concerns about police culture ==
In 2011, Meurant was interviewed in the documentary Operation 8, which was strongly critical of the anti-terror raids in Ruatoki in 2007. In it, he described the negative aspects of police culture and the actions that stemmed from it.

In Sept 2011, Meurant penned a damning critique of the NZ police in North & South magazine. The article describes police culture in disparaging terms likening it to a forest in which new recruits get lost. Meurant discusses a number of well known cases such as the Crewe murders and says it was more than just a couple of detectives on the case who were corrupt. He says that planting of a cartridge in the Crewe's garden was condoned by police management at the time. He makes the case that some officers are willing to break the law in a misguided belief that the end justifies the means and the means "is best decided by you and others in your sub culture of police, for what better epitomises the values of a decent society than those cherished by the men and women in blue?" He also wrote Too many loose ends to ignore Crewe case in which he states: "It is my view that the police then, as they do now, suffer greatly from the misconception that preservation of the police is more important than preservation of the rule of law."

Another critique of police sub culture was published in The Sunday Star-Times, titled Deep in the Forest in which he wrote:

Every new entrant (to the police) runs the same gauntlet. No recruit is ever formally taught to use violence, to lie and cover up. None of my mentors did that to me and I never did it to those whom I mentored. But the culture sends a very clear message: 'When you witness transgression by a colleague, keep your mouth shut'.

— Ross Meurant,

Meurant also penned Officers in charge of weapons culpable in which he discussed the police shooting of Stephen John Bellingham in Christchurch after Bellingham was attacking cars with a hammer. "Based on what I knew of the incident I do not believe police were justified in shooting to kill."

Meurant also wrote a column "Urewera trial shows the cops have been getting it wrong". in which he criticised the police for the raids of October 2007 in which 17 people were arrested – allegedly as terrorists. Most of the charges were dropped four years later. Meurant believes the police abrogated the basic legal rights of defendants to "no detention without charge" and "to be taken before a court as soon as possible".
