= Papatoetoe (electorate) =

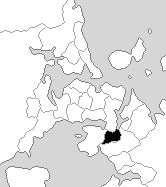
Papatoetoe electorate boundaries between 1993 and 1996.

Papatoetoe is a former New Zealand parliamentary electorate, and is part of greater Auckland.

== Population centres ==
The 1977 electoral redistribution, initiated by Robert Muldoon's National Government, was the most overtly political since the Representation Commission had been established in 1886 through an amendment to the Representation Act. As part of the 1976 census, a large number of people failed to fill out an electoral re-registration card, and census staff had not been given the authority to insist on the card being completed. This had little practical effect for people on the general roll, but it transferred Māori to the general roll if the card was not handed in. Together with a northward shift of New Zealand's population, this resulted in five new electorates having to be created in the upper part of the North Island. The electoral redistribution was very disruptive, and 22 electorates were abolished, while 27 electorates were newly created (including Papatoetoe) or re-established. These changes came into effect for the 1978 election. Papatoetoe was created from parts of the Mangere and Manukau electorates in the 1977 redistribution.

The electorate is urban-suburban, based on the suburb of Papatoetoe, and was in Manukau City, South Auckland. At various times it also included parts of the suburbs of Ōtara, Wiri, and Māngere. To the north it bordered on the Tāmaki River, and between 1984 and 1987 it reached the eastern edge of Manukau Harbour. It also bordered on the electorates of Otahuhu, Hunua, Manurewa, and Mangere from 1978 to 1984, and Panmure, Otara, Manurewa, and Māngere from 1984 to 1996. The Papatoetoe electorate was eventually absorbed into Māngere and the newly created Manukau East electorates for the 1996 election.

== History ==
The electorate existed from 1978 to the introduction of mixed-member proportional (MMP) representation in 1996 and was represented by two Labour MPs. In the 1978 election, the Papatoetoe electorate was won by Eddie Isbey, who had been MP for the Grey Lynn electorate since 1969 election. Isbey retired at the 1987 election and was succeeded by Ross Robertson. When the Papatoetoe electorate was abolished in 1996, Robertson transferred to the Manukau East electorate, which he represented until 2014.

=== Members of Parliament ===
Key

Labour

Elections	Winner
1978 election	Eddie Isbey
1981 election	Eddie Isbey
1984 election	Eddie Isbey
1987 election	Ross Robertson
1990 election	Ross Robertson
1993 election	Ross Robertson
(Electorate abolished in 1996; see Manukau East)

== Election results ==
=== 1993 election ===
1993 general election: Papatoetoe
Party	Candidate	Votes	%	±%
Labour	Ross Robertson	9,769	53.66	+8.50
National	Jim Wild	3,792	20.83	
Alliance	Harry Alchin-Smith	2,529	13.89	
NZ First	Nerida Nichols	1,774	9.74	
Christian Heritage	Albery Ruijne	271	1.48	
Natural Law	Graeme Kettle	67	0.36	
Majority		5,977	32.83	+30.00
Turnout		18,202	82.38	+0.18
Registered electors		22,095		

=== 1990 election ===
1990 general election: Papatoetoe
Party	Candidate	Votes	%	±%
Labour	Ross Robertson	8,122	45.16	−9.44
National	Allan Brewster	7,612	42.33	
Green	Perry Spiller	1,199	6.66	
NewLabour	Bo Kingi Rawhiti	714	3.97	
Social Credit	Jim Duffy	168	0.93	
Democrats	Wilhelm Tua Amstad	167	0.92	
Majority		510	2.83	−12.15
Turnout		17,982	82.20	−1.65
Registered electors		21,874		

=== 1987 election ===
1987 general election: Papatoetoe
Party	Candidate	Votes	%	±%
Labour	Ross Robertson	9,795	54.60	
National	Howard Martin	7,106	39.61	
Democrats	Doug Shirley	813	4.53	
NZ Party	Isobel Martin	225	1.25	
Majority		2,689	14.98	
Turnout		17,939	83.85	−0.14
Registered electors		21,392		

=== 1984 election ===
1984 general election: Papatoetoe
Party	Candidate	Votes	%	±%
Labour	Eddie Isbey	9,697	48.94	+6.38
National	Peter O'Brien	6,701	33.82	
NZ Party	David Craven	2,479	12.51	
Social Credit	Gordon James Harvey	935	4.71	
Majority		2,996	15.12	+6.26
Turnout		19,812	90.40	+0.26
Registered electors		21,915		

=== 1981 election ===
1981 general election: Papatoetoe
Party	Candidate	Votes	%	±%
Labour	Eddie Isbey	8,109	42.56	−3.17
National	Roy McKeen	6,420	33.70	
Social Credit	Alan Shaw	4,521	23.73	+8.18
Majority		1,689	8.86	+0.65
Turnout		19,050	90.14	+22.38
Registered electors		21,133		

=== 1978 election ===
1978 general election: Papatoetoe
Party	Candidate	Votes	%	±%
Labour	Eddie Isbey	8,412	45.73	
National	Colin Bidois	6,901	37.52	
Social Credit	Alan Shaw	2,861	15.55	
Values	P G Crozier	217	1.17	
Majority		1,511	8.21	
Turnout		18,391	67.76	
Registered electors		27,140		
