= Otara (electorate) =

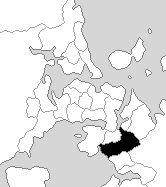
Otara electorate boundaries between 1993 and 1996

Otara was a New Zealand parliamentary electorate in Auckland, from 1984 to 1996. It existed for four parliamentary terms and was represented by three members of parliament, two from Labour and one from National.

== Population centres ==
The 1981 census had shown that the North Island had experienced further population growth, and three additional general seats were created through the 1983 electoral redistribution, bringing the total number of electorates to 95. The South Island had, for the first time, experienced a population loss, but its number of general electorates was fixed at 25 since the 1967 electoral redistribution. More of the South Island population was moving to Christchurch, and two electorates were abolished, while two electorates were recreated. In the North Island, six electorates were newly created (including Otara), three electorates were recreated, and six electorates were abolished.

This suburban electorate was in the southern part of greater Auckland.

== History ==
The electorate was established in the 1984 election, and Colin Moyle of the Labour Party was its first representative. Moyle had first been elected in 1963 in the Manukau electorate and had since 1981 represented the Hunua electorate. Moyle retired in 1990 (when there was a swing against Labour) and the new Labour candidate, Taito Phillip Field, was defeated by Trevor Rogers of the National Party.

In the 1993 election, Trevor Rogers moved east to the new Howick electorate, which covered higher-income suburbs that traditionally voted for National. Taito Phillip Field won the electorate against Mr. Frith of National. When the Otara electorate was abolished in 1996, Field transferred to the Mangere electorate.

=== Members of Parliament ===
Key

Labour National

| Election | Winner |
|---|---|
| 1984 election | Colin Moyle |
| 1987 election | Colin Moyle |
| 1990 election | Trevor Rogers |
| 1993 election | Taito Phillip Field |
(Electorate abolished in 1996; see Mangere)

== Election results ==
=== 1993 election ===
1993 general election: Otara
| Party | Candidate | Votes | % | ±% |
|---|---|---|---|---|
| Labour | Taito Phillip Field | 8,080 | 61.29 | +21.95 |
| National | Shane Frith | 2,099 | 15.92 | |
| Alliance | Bob Newman | 1,856 | 14.07 | |
| Representative Party | Ted Faleauto | 641 | 4.86 | |
| Christian Heritage | James Ward | 253 | 1.91 | |
| Mana Motuhake | Dan Davis | 100 | 0.75 | |
| McGillicuddy Serious | Andy Cave | 78 | 0.59 | |
| Workers Rights | Stanley Hieatt | 59 | 0.44 | |
| Independent | Louis Glassie | 16 | 0.12 | |
| Majority | | 5,981 | 45.37 | |
| Turnout | | 13,182 | 75.71 | −7.44 |
| Registered electors | | 17,411 | | |

=== 1990 election ===
1990 general election: Otara
| Party | Candidate | Votes | % | ±% |
|---|---|---|---|---|
| National | Trevor Rogers | 8,586 | 45.89 | +5.65 |
| Labour | Taito Phillip Field | 7,360 | 39.34 | |
| Green | Gary Wiki | 1,297 | 6.93 | |
| NewLabour | Matt Robson | 1,144 | 6.11 | |
| Democrats | John Kilford | 210 | 1.12 | |
| Social Credit | Gale Ngakuru | 109 | 0.58 | |
| Majority | | 1,226 | 6.55 | |
| Turnout | | 18,706 | 83.15 | −2.18 |
| Registered electors | | 22,495 | | |

=== 1987 election ===
1987 general election: Otara
| Party | Candidate | Votes | % | ±% |
|---|---|---|---|---|
| Labour | Colin Moyle | 8,985 | 54.99 | −6.03 |
| National | Trevor Rogers | 6,576 | 40.24 | |
| Democrats | Joe Clark | 700 | 4.28 | |
| Socialist Action | Eugen LePou | 77 | 0.47 | |
| Majority | | 2,409 | 14.74 | −22.85 |
| Turnout | | 16,338 | 85.33 | −5.14 |
| Registered electors | | 19,145 | | |

=== 1984 election ===
1984 general election: Otara
| Party | Candidate | Votes | % | ±% |
|---|---|---|---|---|
| Labour | Colin Moyle | 10,583 | 61.02 | |
| National | Taua Michael Tafua | 4,064 | 23.43 | |
| NZ Party | Barbara Hoera | 1,762 | 10.16 | |
| Social Credit | Dan Davis | 839 | 4.83 | |
| Mana Motuhake | Reginald Tamihere | 94 | 0.54 | |
| Majority | | 6,519 | 37.59 | |
| Turnout | | 17,342 | 90.47 | |
| Registered electors | | 19,167 | | |
