= New Zealand Conservative Party =

- Founder: Ross Meurant
- Founded: September 1994
- Split from: New Zealand National Party
- Ideology: Conservatism
- Political position: Centre-right to right-wing
- Former Name: Right of Centre

The New Zealand Conservative Party (originally known as Right of Centre) was a short-lived political party in New Zealand. It was founded by a dissident National Party MP, Ross Meurant.

== Foundation ==
Meurant had led the New Zealand Police's high-profile "Red Squad" during the controversial 1981 Springbok Tour. He became a National Party MP in 1987 and won re-election as such in 1990 and in 1993. Meurant often clashed with the leadership of the National Party over Māori policy, and was regarded as one of the leading dissidents within the National caucus at the time. Eventually, in September 1994, Meurant decided to break away from National and to establish his own party, adopting the name "Right of Centre" (or "ROC"). The acronym represented Meurant's right-wing economic philosophy of privatisation of government assets.

The new party was originally conceived by former National MPs Rob Munro (formerly a lieutenant-colonel in the New Zealand Army), lawyer Graham Reeves, and Meurant. Munro and Reeves had lost their National seats in 1993. Meurant remained in Parliament but was an implacable critic of Prime Minister Jim Bolger. To some extent the new party represented an opportunity for the former MPs to re-enter parliament. However, as the 1996 general election loomed, Munro retreated to obscurity and Reeves returned to the National Party fold to contest the unwinnable Tukituki electorate seat for National.

== Relationship with National Party ==
Meurant held the view that the new MMP formula for delivering parliamentary seats precluded any single party from achieving an outright majority (except in the most exceptional circumstances). Misguidedly, he anticipated that Prime Minister Bolger and his trusted aide, Finance Minister Bill Birch, would recognise the mathematical inevitability of the MMP formula and embrace Meurant and the former National party conspirators, in a post-election coalition.

But Meurant had mis-read the animosity Bolger had for him that, in the final analysis, condemned Meurant's party to oblivion. Though history did vindicate Meurant's belief that the MMP formula would not deliver an outright winning party at the polls. In fact, in 1996, the Bolger government finally accepted the inevitability of Meurant's claim and reached a pact with ACT, the second political party to be formed under MMP. ACT had been formed by former Labour Finance Minister Roger Douglas (now Sir Roger Douglas). National withdrew its candidate from the Wellington Central electorate to ensure ACT's candidate, Richard Prebble, would succeed in the election. This provided ACT with an electorate MP to offset its failure (as happened with all minor parties in the first general election under MMP (including the Christian Coalition) to reach the 5% threshold of votes to qualify as a political party with "List MPs" in parliament. This manoeuvre enabled Bolger to cobble together a coalition with ACT personalities whom he preferred to Meurant.

Prior to the 1996 general election, however, and prior to Meurant resigning from National, Meurant came to an arrangement with Bolger whereby Right-of-Centre would not oppose the National Party government in votes of confidence and supply; in exchange, Meurant would keep his governmental post as Parliamentary Undersecretary for Agriculture.

Until the emergence of other dissident National and Labour MPs (who formed the political party United with a base of seven MPs), Meurant actually held the balance of power and this allowed the National government to maintain its majority in the House.

Meurant built a political party largely on the provincial farming network of Federated Farmers (former president Lumsden was a candidate) and Meat Board representatives (Tim Britton and John McCarthy were both candidates).

On 8 June 1995, Meurant was joined by Trevor Rogers, another dissident National MP. Rogers was well known for his campaigns against pornography. He was a particular opponent of the internet, which he saw as facilitating the distribution of pornography and, in 1994, he had proposed a bill to completely outlaw the viewing of pornography on the internet. After a long period of argument with his fellow National MPs, Rogers decided that his future did not lie with the National Party and he transferred his allegiance to Right of Centre. This gave the party two MPs.

In September 1995, Right of Centre clashed with the National Party when Ross Meurant was sacked as Parliamentary Undersecretary for Agriculture. This came as a result of Meurant's accepting a directorship of Prok Bank, a Russian-owned bank registered in Vanuatu. Prime Minister Bolger believed that this directorship was inappropriate for someone holding an executive post in government, and requested that Meurant resign the directorship. Meurant refused, and was sacked as Parliamentary Undersecretary. Despite the tension this generated, Right of Centre continued to support the National government.

== General Election, 1996 ==
Meanwhile, Right of Centre was not achieving the success in the polls that Meurant and Rogers had hoped. Meurant had strategised his party to capture a portion of the provincial conservative vote in New Zealand, but after more than a year, the party was still barely registering. It was decided in October 1995 to rebrand the party as the New Zealand Conservative Party. The group retained its socially conservative policies but also attempted to win support from the rural sector. This new campaign was based on the claim that National, once strongly associated with the agricultural sector, had abandoned farmers for "big business" and the cities. This new attempt to build a voter base did not meet with any noticeable success.

As the election loomed, internal disputes in Right of Centre occurred. In February 1996, Meurant rejected pressure from the executive of the party to abandon right-wing economic policies in favour of the more traditional and socialist provincial New Zealand policies. Meurant refused, claiming he alone had garnered substantial monetary donations from wealthy individuals, and on the promise of right wing economic policy forming the basis of the new party.

When the executive of the Party overruled Meurant and refused to return political donations garnered by Meurant on the promise of right wing economic policies, Meurant left the party and became an independent, following the path of most former independent MPs: to political oblivion. During the election campaign, despite having an incumbent MP in Rogers, the party was left out of the television debates and as a result got little daily newspaper coverage which contributed to their poor polling result.

After the general election of 1996, the party had an even lower profile before the remnants of the party amalgamated with the United Party in April 1998.
