= Waka jumping =

Term for party switching in New Zealand

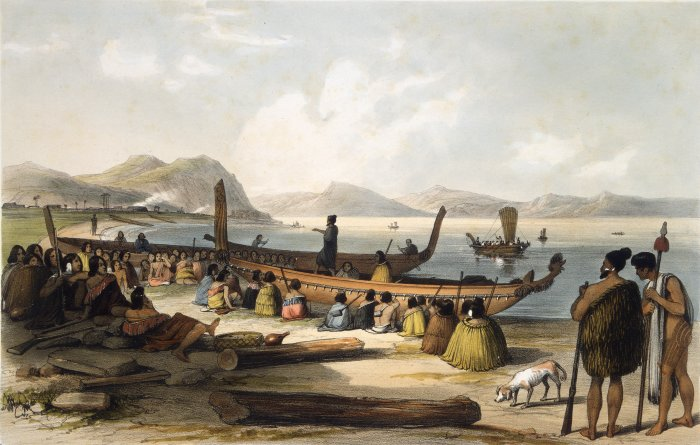
Waka taua (war canoes) at the Bay of Islands, 1827–28; waka jump means 'to jump ship'

Waka jumping is when a New Zealand member of Parliament (MP) either switches political party between elections (taking their parliamentary seat with them and potentially upsetting electoral proportionality in the New Zealand Parliament) or when a list MP's party membership ceases. The action is also called party hopping.

"Waka jumping" is a colloquial term that comes from traditional Māori waka (canoes). Hence, "waka jumping" is analogous to the seafaring term "jump ship", i.e., to leave a ship's crew abruptly and against the terms of a contract (or naval enlistment).

In 2001, legislation was enacted that required MPs to leave Parliament if they left their party; this law expired after the 2005 election. In 2018 a similar law was passed, which requires a defecting MP to give up their seat at the request of the leader of their former party. Electorate MPs may re-contest their seat in a by-election, whereas list MPs are replaced by the next available person on the party list.

A 2013 Fairfax-Ipsos poll found that 76% of those surveyed oppose MPs staying in Parliament if they leave their party.

== Legislation ==
The implementation of the mixed-member proportional (MMP) electoral system after a referendum in 1993 led to a series of defections and re-alignments as the former two-party system adjusted to the change. This led to the rise and fall of a number of political parties in New Zealand, including the creation of New Zealand First and ACT. The new political climate tended to favour the establishment of new political parties, since in former times dissidents had often simply become independent MPs. In the two parliaments before the 2001 act was passed, 22 MPs defected.

=== Electoral (Integrity) Amendment Act 2001 ===
The frequency of waka jumping led to the passing of the Electoral (Integrity) Amendment Act 2001, which had been introduced by Labour Party associate justice minister Margaret Wilson in 1999, but had been promoted by Labour's coalition partner Alliance ahead of that year's general election. The act expired at the 2005 election, when a sunset clause came into effect. It required MPs who had entered Parliament via a party list to resign from Parliament if they left that party's parliamentary caucus.

However, parties were able to find ways around this law. When the Alliance party split in 2002 over how to respond to the invasion of Afghanistan, Jim Anderton nominally remained the leader of the Alliance inside Parliament while he campaigned outside Parliament as leader of the newly founded Progressive Party. The resulting uncertainty around the Alliance’s position contributed to Prime Minister Helen Clark's decision to call an early general election in 2002. While the law was in force, it was used once to expel a list MP from Parliament (an electorate MP who changed parties could still fight a by-election, as Tariana Turia did).

In December 2003, the ACT Party caucus voted to expel Donna Awatere Huata, an ACT list MP who became an independent after she had been charged with fraud. The expulsion became the subject of litigation, and Awatere Huata was not expelled from Parliament until a Supreme Court decision handed down in November 2004. A proposed bill to replace the act in 2005 failed.

=== Electoral (Integrity) Amendment Act 2018 and repeal attempt ===
The Electoral (Integrity) Amendment Act 2018 received royal assent on 3 October 2018 and entered into force the next day. The provisions on waka jumping now appear as section 55A of the Electoral Act 1993. Under those provisions, members of Parliament who choose to leave their party or are expelled from their party are also expelled from Parliament if the leader of the party under which they were elected issues appropriate notice to the Speaker that the MP should be expelled, with the seat becoming vacant. Unlike the 2001 act, the 2018 act does not have a sunset clause and so remains in force until it is repealed. The act was passed as part of the coalition agreement between New Zealand First and the Labour Party and supported through Parliament "begrudgingly" by the Green Party under the terms of its own confidence-and-supply agreement with Labour.

A member's bill in the name of National Party MP David Carter with the intent of repealing the Electoral (Integrity) Amendment Act 2018 was introduced into Parliament in July 2020. The Green Party defied other government parties to support the repeal bill, with the first reading in Parliament passing by 64 to 55 votes. Carter's Electoral (Integrity Repeal) Amendment Bill was then referred to the justice select committee. After the 2020 New Zealand general election, the bill's second reading was held on 12 May and 14 June 2021, and the Labour Party used its majority of 65 seats to block its passage.

== List of MPs who left their party ==
Below is a list of members who left their party while in parliament. With the introduction of MMP came list MPs, and the potential for a member to be brought into parliament without being voted upon directly.

=== Since MMP ===
Name	Original party	Switched	New party
Jim Anderton	Labour	1989	NewLabour
Jim Anderton	NewLabour	1991	Alliance
Jim Anderton	Alliance	2002	Progressives
Gilbert Myles	National	1992	Liberal Party
Gilbert Myles	Liberal Party	1993	Alliance
Gilbert Myles	Alliance	1993	New Zealand First
Hamish MacIntyre	National	1992	Liberal Party
Hamish MacIntyre	Liberal Party	1993	Alliance
Winston Peters	National	1993	Independent
Winston Peters	Independent	1993	New Zealand First
Ross Meurant	National	1994	Conservatives
Peter Dunne	Labour	1994	Future New Zealand
Peter Dunne	Future New Zealand	1995	United
Graeme Lee	National	1995	Christian Democrats
Trevor Rogers	National	1995	Conservatives
Clive Matthewson	Labour	1995	United
Bruce Cliffe	National	1995	United
Margaret Austin	Labour	1995	United
Pauline Gardner	National	1995	United
Peter Hilt	National	1995	United
John Robertson	National	1995	United
Peter McCardle	National	1996	New Zealand First
Peter McCardle	New Zealand First	1998	Independent
Jack Elder	Labour	1996	New Zealand First
Jack Elder	New Zealand First	1998	Mauri Pacific
Michael Laws	National	1996	New Zealand First
Alamein Kopu	Alliance	1997	Independent
Alamein Kopu	Independent	1997	Mana Wahine
Tau Henare	New Zealand First	1998	Mauri Pacific
Rana Waitai	New Zealand First	1998	Mauri Pacific
Ann Batten	New Zealand First	1998	Mauri Pacific
Tuku Morgan	New Zealand First	1998	Mauri Pacific
Deborah Morris	New Zealand First	1998	Independent
Tuariki Delamere	New Zealand First	1998	Independent
Tuariki Delamere	Independent	1999	Te Tawharau
Frank Grover	Alliance	1999	Christian Heritage
Jeanette Fitzsimons	Alliance	1999	Green
Rod Donald	Alliance	1999	Green
Matt Robson	Alliance	2002	Progressives
Tariana Turia	Labour	2004	Māori Party
Taito Phillip Field	Labour	2007	Pacific Party
Gordon Copeland	United Future	2007	Independent
Hone Harawira	Māori Party	2011	Mana Party
Hone Harawira	Mana Party	2014	Internet-Mana
Brendan Horan	New Zealand First	2012	Independent Coalition
Jami-Lee Ross	National	2018	Independent
Jami-Lee Ross	Independent	2020	Advance New Zealand
Meka Whaitiri	Labour	2023	Te Pāti Māori
Elizabeth Kerekere	Green	2023	Independent
Darleen Tana	Green	2024	Independent
Mariameno Kapa-Kingi	Te Pāti Māori	2026	Te Tai Tokerau Party

1.After becoming an independent politician, Peters successfully contested a by-election in his Tauranga electorate.
2.After switching to the Maori Party, Turia had to contest a by-election, in line with the ban on waka jumping then in force. She won the resulting contest in Te Tai Hauauru.
3.After crossing to the Mana Movement, Harawira successfully contested a by-election in his constituency of Te Tai Tokerau.
4.Whilst Kapa-Kingi left Te Pāti Māori to form Te Tai Tokerau Party in May 2026, she served as an independent in Parliament for the remainder of her term.

=== Before MMP ===
MPs elected to parliament before the introduction of mixed-member proportional representation in 1996:

Name	Original party	Switched	New party
Thomas Mackenzie	Independent	1890	Conservative
Thomas Mackenzie	Conservative	1891	Independent
Thomas Mackenzie	Independent	1900	Independent Liberal
Thomas Mackenzie	Independent Liberal	1902	Liberal
Frank Lawry	Conservative	1891	Liberal
George Hutchison	Independent	1891	Conservative
Robert Thompson	Conservative	1893	Liberal
Robert Thompson	Liberal	1896	Independent
Robert Thompson	Independent	1899	Independent Liberal
Felix McGuire	Independent	1896	Conservative
Ewen Alison	Independent	1905	Conservative
Frank Fisher	Liberal	1905	New Liberal
Frank Fisher	New Liberal	1908	Independent
Frank Fisher	Independent	1910	Reform
William Hughes Field	Liberal	1908	Independent
William Hughes Field	Independent	1909	Reform
David McLaren	Ind. Labour League	1910	Labour (1910)
Vigor Brown	Liberal	1920	Reform
Alfred Hindmarsh	Labour (1910)	1912	United Labour
Alfred Hindmarsh	United Labour	1916	Labour
Bill Veitch	Independent Labour	1912	United Labour
Bill Veitch	United Labour	1916	Independent
Bill Veitch	Independent	1922	Liberal
Bill Veitch	Liberal	1928	United
John Payne	Labour (1910)	1912	Independent Labour
John Payne	Independent Labour	1916	Independent
Gordon Coates	Independent	1914	Reform
Gordon Coates	Reform	1936	National
Gordon Coates	National	1942	Independent
James McCombs	Social Democrat	1916	Labour
James McCombs	Labour	1917	Independent Labour
James McCombs	Independent Labour	1918	Labour
Paddy Webb	Social Democrat	1916	Labour
Andrew Walker	United Labour	1916	Labour
George Sykes	Reform	1919	Independent
George Sykes	Independent	1922	Reform
Bert Kyle	Reform	1936	National
Bert Kyle	National	1942	Independent
John A. Lee	Labour	1940	Democratic Labour
Bill Barnard	Labour	1940	Democratic Labour
William Sheat	National	1954	Independent
William Sheat	Independent	1954	National
Gavin Downie	National	1978	Independent
John Kirk	Labour	1983	Independent
Brian MacDonell	Labour	1983	Independent

== See also ==
- Aaya Ram Gaya Ram
- Anti-defection law (India)
- Crossing the floor (United Kingdom)
- Floor crossing (South Africa)
- Frog (Malaysian politics) for a similar concept in Malaysia
- Trasformismo for a similar concept in Italy
