= 43rd New Zealand Parliament =

Term of the Parliament of New Zealand

43rd Parliament of New Zealand
| ← | 42nd Parliament | 44th Parliament | → |
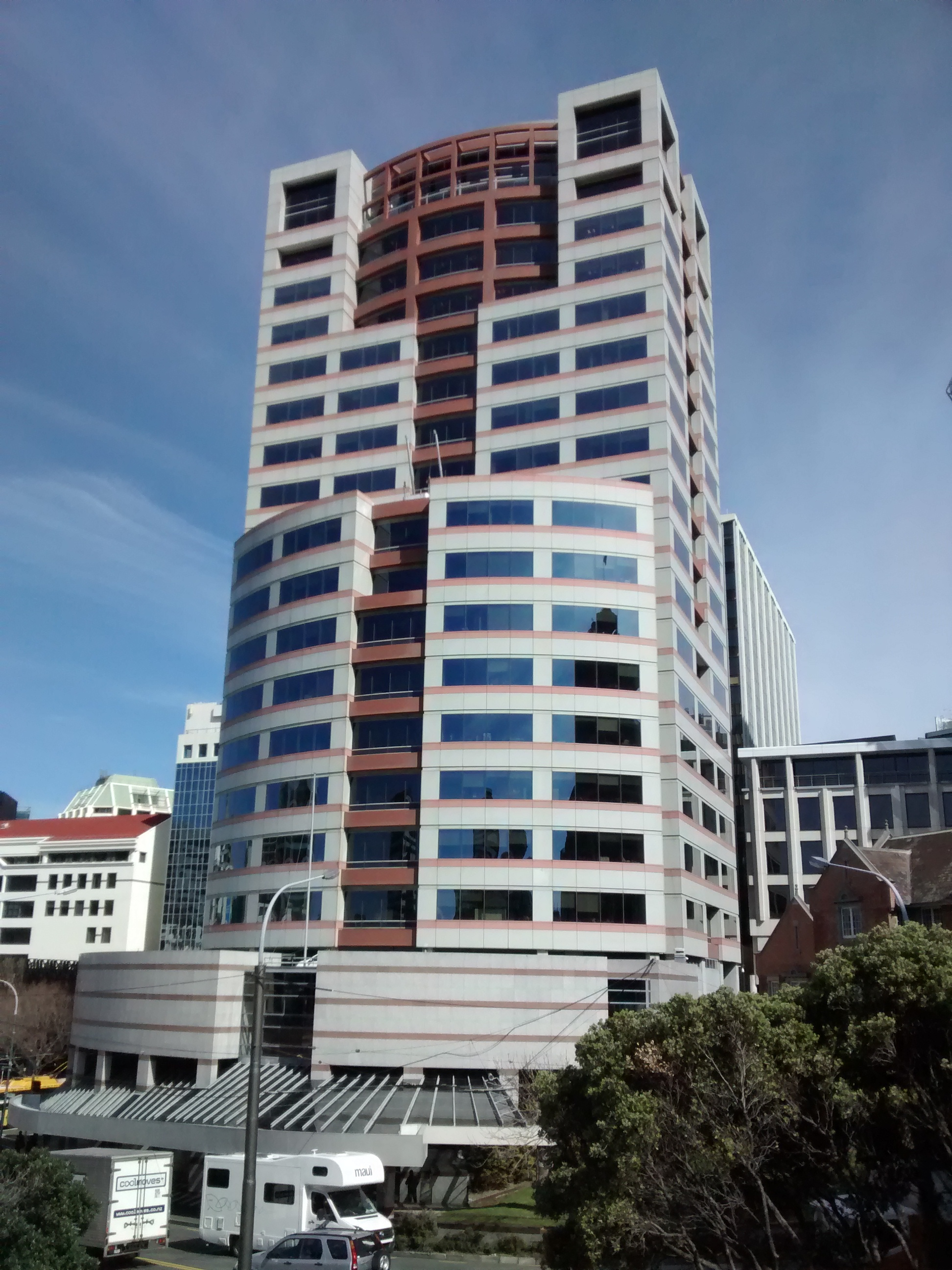
- Bowen House, Wellington

Overview
- Legislative body: New Zealand Parliament
- Term: 28 November 1990 – 23 September 1993
- Election: 1990 New Zealand general election
- Government: Fourth National Government

House of Representatives
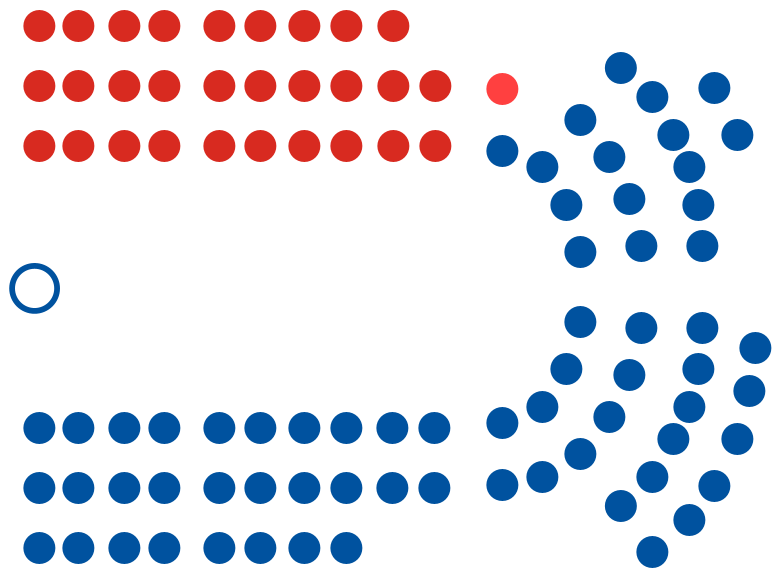
- Members: 97
- Speaker of the House: Robin Gray
- Leader of the House: Don McKinnon — Paul East until 27 March 1993
- Prime Minister: Jim Bolger
- Leader of the Opposition: Mike Moore

Sovereign
- Monarch: Elizabeth II
- Governor-General: Catherine Tizard — Paul Reeves until 29 November 1990

Sessions
- 1st: 28 November 1990 – 19 December 1990
- 2nd: 22 January 1991 – 23 September 1993

The 43rd New Zealand Parliament was a term of the Parliament of New Zealand. Its composition was determined by the 1990 elections, and it sat until the 1993 elections.

The 43rd Parliament saw the beginning of the fourth National Party government, with the Labour Party failing to win a third term in office. The 43rd Parliament was heavily dominated by National, which controlled nearly seventy percent of the seats. Only one minor party, Jim Anderton's NewLabour, was present at the beginning of the 43rd Parliament. Later, NewLabour would join with several unrepresented parties to form the Alliance, which would gain two additional seats when two National MPs defected. Another National MP, Winston Peters, would also break away from his party, becoming an independent.

The 43rd Parliament consisted of ninety-seven representatives, the same as the previous Parliament. All of these representatives were chosen by single-member geographical electorates, including four Māori electorates.

From 1991 to 1996—including the majority of the 43rd term of Parliament—MPs met in a debating chamber in Bowen House while Parliament House was being refurbished.

== Electoral boundaries for the 43rd Parliament ==
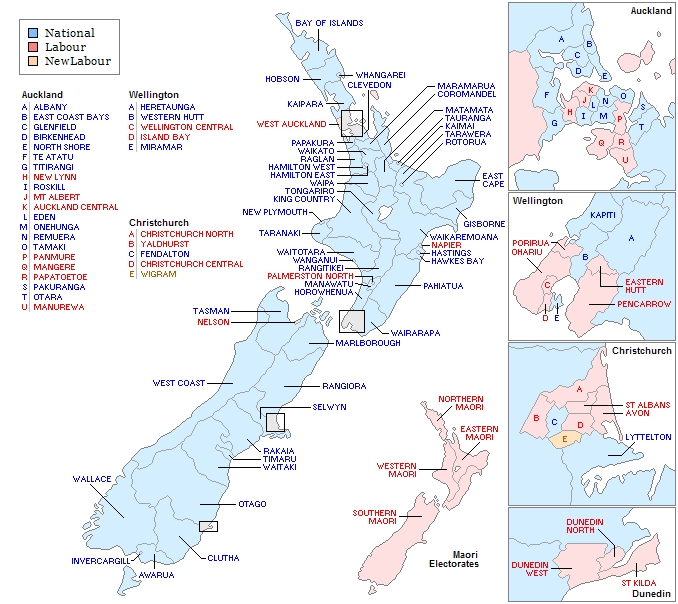

== Overview of seats ==
The table below shows the number of MPs in each party following the 1990 election and at dissolution:

| Affiliation | Members | |
| Affiliation | At 1990 election | At dissolution |
|---|---|---|
| National | 67 | 63 |
| Government total | 67 | 63 |
| Labour | 29 | 29 |
| NewLabour | 1 | Merger ^{1} |
| Alliance | Not yet founded | 2 |
| NZ First | Not yet founded | 2 |
| Independent | – | 1 |
| Opposition total | 30 | 34 |
| Total | 97 | 97 |
| Working Government majority | 37 | 29 |

Notes

- ^1 Jim Anderton, Leader of the NewLabour Party merged the party into the newly founded Alliance party.
- The Working Government majority is calculated as all Government MPs less all other parties.

== Initial composition of the 43rd Parliament ==
The tables below shows the results of the 1990 general election:

Key

National Labour Democrats NewLabour Mana Motuhake

Electorate results for the 1990 New Zealand general election
| Electorate | Incumbent | Winner | Majority | Runner up |
|---|---|---|---|---|
General electorates
| Albany | Don McKinnon | | 7,455 | June Allen |
| Ashburton | Jenny Shipley | | 7,922 | Basil Moskovis |
| Auckland Central | Richard Prebble | | 3,277 | Kathryn Hill |
| Avon | Larry Sutherland | | 4,250 | Wendy Rush |
| Awarua | Jeff Grant | | 4,964 | Heather Russell |
| Bay of Islands | John Carter | | 5,285 | Bruce Raitt |
| Birkenhead | Jenny Kirk | Ian Revell | 2,813 | Jenny Kirk |
| Christchurch Central | Geoffrey Palmer | Lianne Dalziel | 3,769 | Ross Gluer |
| Christchurch North | Mike Moore | | 2,148 | Peter Yarrell |
| Clevedon | Warren Kyd | | 4,732 | Ann Batten |
| Clutha | Robin Gray | | 6,527 | Jeff Buchanan |
| Coromandel | Graeme Lee | | 6,342 | Margaret Hawkeswood |
| Dunedin North | Stan Rodger | Pete Hodgson | 2,336 | Gael Donoghue |
| Dunedin West | Clive Matthewson | | 1,779 | Ian McMeeking |
| East Cape | Anne Collins | Tony Ryall | 1,968 | Dianne Collins |
| East Coast Bays | Murray McCully | | 5,216 | Gary Knapp |
| Eastern Hutt | Trevor Young | Paul Swain | 801 | Rosemary Thomas |
| Eden | Richard Northey | Christine Fletcher | 1,524 | Richard Northey |
| Fendalton | Philip Burdon | | 4,993 | Tony Day |
| Gisborne | Allan Wallbank | Wayne Kimber | 449 | Allan Wallbank |
| Glenfield | Judy Keall | Peter Hilt | 2,958 | Judy Keall |
| Hamilton East | Bill Dillon | Tony Steel | 2,121 | Bill Dillon |
| Hamilton West | Trevor Mallard | Grant Thomas | 1,563 | Trevor Mallard |
| Hastings | David Butcher | Jeff Whittaker | 728 | David Butcher |
| Hawkes Bay | Bill Sutton | Michael Laws | 2,895 | Bill Sutton |
| Heretaunga | Bill Jeffries | Peter McCardle | 1,122 | Bill Jeffries |
| Hobson | Ross Meurant | | 6,641 | Howard Henry |
| Horowhenua | Annette King | Hamish Hancock | 624 | Annette King |
| Invercargill | Rob Munro | | 4,137 | Barry Rait |
| Island Bay | Elizabeth Tennet | | 3,635 | Ann Nolan |
| Kaimai | Robert Anderson | | 8,147 | Gordon Dickson |
| Kaipara | Lockwood Smith | | 8,610 | Wayne Sellwood |
| Kapiti | Margaret Shields | Roger Sowry | 1,599 | Margaret Shields |
| King Country | Jim Bolger | | 7,274 | Cameron Gordon |
| Lyttelton | Peter Simpson | Gail McIntosh | 68 | Peter Simpson |
| Manawatu | David Robinson | Hamish MacIntyre | 3,089 | David Robinson |
| Mangere | David Lange | | 4,039 | Bryan Archer |
| Manurewa | Roger Douglas | George Hawkins | 1,143 | Pat Baker |
| Maramarua | Bill Birch | | 7,670 | Charles Chauvel |
| Marlborough | Doug Kidd | | 7,187 | Barbara Hutchinson |
| Matamata | John Luxton | | 8,501 | Bill Pepperell |
| Miramar | Peter Neilson | Graeme Reeves | 552 | Peter Neilson |
| Mt Albert | Helen Clark | | 1,230 | Larry Bellshaw |
| Napier | Geoff Braybrooke | | 1,265 | Colleen Pritchard |
| Nelson | Philip Woollaston | John Blincoe | 636 | Liz Baigent |
| New Lynn | Jonathan Hunt | | 1,099 | Martyn Athol Bishop |
| New Plymouth | Harry Duynhoven | John Armstrong | 1,701 | Harry Duynhoven |
| North Shore | George Gair | Bruce Cliffe | 6,183 | Graeme Ransom |
| Ohariu | Peter Dunne | | 783 | George Mathew |
| Onehunga | Fred Gerbic | Grahame Thorne | 612 | Fred Gerbic |
| Otago | Warren Cooper | | 3,927 | Tony Cooke |
| Otara | Colin Moyle | Trevor Rogers | 1,226 | Taito Phillip Field |
| Pahiatua | John Falloon | | 7,689 | Margo Martindale |
| Pakuranga | Maurice Williamson | | 9,086 | Paul Charles Grant |
| Palmerston North | Trevor de Cleene | Steve Maharey | 349 | Paul Sherriff |
| Panmure | Bob Tizard | Judith Tizard | 1,098 | Gray Bartlett |
| Papakura | Merv Wellington | John Robertson | 5,665 | James Stubbs |
| Papatoetoe | Ross Robertson | | 510 | Allan Brewster |
| Pencarrow | Sonja Davies | | 384 | Ray Wallace |
| Porirua | Graham Kelly | | 3,453 | Philip Faulkner |
| Raglan | Simon Upton | | 5,442 | Olivia Scaletti-Longley |
| Rangiora | Jim Gerard | | 5,273 | Judith Alison McLachlan |
| Rangitikei | Denis Marshall | | 6,127 | Patricia Barton |
| Remuera | Doug Graham | | 7,368 | Carl Harding |
| Roskill | Phil Goff | Gilbert Myles | 644 | Phil Goff |
| Rotorua | Paul East | | 5,270 | Bruce Raitt |
| St Albans | David Caygill | | 1,560 | David Dumergue |
| St Kilda | Michael Cullen | | 1,886 | Bruce Alexander |
| Selwyn | Ruth Richardson | | 5,441 | Val Elley |
| Sydenham | Jim Anderton | | 1,443 | Linda Constable |
| Tamaki | Robert Muldoon | | 7,592 | Malcolm Johnston |
| Taranaki | Roger Maxwell | | 7,867 | Scott Dalziel |
| Tarawera | Ian McLean | Max Bradford | 5,152 | Malcolm Moore |
| Tasman | Ken Shirley | Nick Smith | 2,246 | Ken Shirley |
| Tauranga | Winston Peters | | 9,314 | Bill Delaney |
| Te Atatu | Michael Bassett | Brian Neeson | 1,370 | Dan McCaffrey |
| Timaru | Maurice McTigue | | 3,192 | Gary Clarke |
| Titirangi | Ralph Maxwell | Marie Hasler | 64 | Ralph Maxwell |
| Tongariro | Noel Scott | Ian Peters | 886 | Noel Scott |
| Waikaremoana | Roger McClay | | 5,865 | David Davies |
| Waikato | Rob Storey | | 6,172 | George Middleton |
| Waipa | Katherine O'Regan | | 8,477 | Mark Apiata-Wade |
| Wairarapa | Wyatt Creech | | 4,141 | Pauline Moran |
| Waitaki | Jim Sutton | Alec Neill | 2,905 | Jim Sutton |
| Waitotara | Venn Young | Peter Gresham | 7,192 | Dominic O'Sullivan |
| Wallace | Derek Angus | Bill English | 8,886 | David Soper |
| Wanganui | Russell Marshall | Cam Campion | 409 | Jill Pettis |
| Wellington Central | Fran Wilde | | 246 | Pauline Gardiner (Note: Gardiner was first on election night for Wellington Central, but lost when special votes were included) |
| West Auckland | Jack Elder | | 252 | Laurie Wicks |
| West Coast | Kerry Burke | Margaret Moir | 2,611 | Kerry Burke |
| Western Hutt | John Terris | Joy Quigley | 700 | John Terris |
| Whangarei | John Banks | | 6,839 | Edna Tait |
| Yaldhurst | Margaret Austin | | 42 | John Connelly |
Māori electorates
| Eastern Maori | Peter Tapsell | | 6,844 | Wi Kuki Kaa |
| Northern Maori | Bruce Gregory | | 956 | Matiu Rata |
| Southern Maori | Whetu Tirikatene-Sullivan | | 7,614 | Tikirau Stevens |
| Western Maori | Koro Wētere | | 5,466 | Eva Rickard |

Table footnotes:

== Changes during 43rd Parliament ==
There were a number of changes during the term of the 43rd Parliament.

=== By-elections ===
| Electorate and by-election | | Date | Incumbent | Cause | Winner |
|---|---|---|---|---|---|
| Tamaki | 1992 | 15 February | Sir Robert Muldoon | Resignation | Clem Simich |
| Wellington Central | 1992 | 12 December | Fran Wilde | Election as Mayor of Wellington | Chris Laidlaw |
| Tauranga | 1993 | 17 April | Winston Peters | Resignation | Winston Peters |

- Robert Muldoon, the National Party MP for Tamaki and a former Prime Minister of New Zealand, quit Parliament on 17 December 1991. His departure prompted a by-election in Tamaki early the following year — it was won by Clem Simich, also of the National Party.
- Fran Wilde, the Labour Party MP for Wellington Central, quit Parliament in 1992 to become Mayor of Wellington. Her departure prompted a by-election in Wellington Central in December — it was won by Chris Laidlaw, also of the Labour Party.
- Winston Peters, the National Party MP for Tauranga, resigned from both his party and his seat on 18 March 1993. His departure prompted a by-election in Tauranga in April — Peters contested and won it as an independent candidate. Later, he would found the New Zealand First party.

=== Party affiliation changes ===
| Name | Year | Seat | From | To |
|---|---|---|---|---|
| Jim Anderton | 1991 | Sydenham | NewLabour | Alliance |
| Gilbert Myles | 1991 | Roskill | National | Independent |
| Gilbert Myles | 1991 | Roskill | Independent | Liberal |
| Gilbert Myles | 1992 | Roskill | Liberal | Alliance |
| Gilbert Myles | 1993 | Roskill | Alliance | New Zealand First |
| Hamish MacIntyre | 1991 | Manawatu | National | Liberal |
| Hamish MacIntyre | 1992 | Manawatu | Liberal | Alliance |
| Cam Campion | 1991 | Wanganui | National | Independent |
| Winston Peters | 1993 | Tauranga | Independent | New Zealand First |

- Jim Anderton, the sole MP for the NewLabour Party, merged his party with several others to form the Alliance in 1991. Anderton was thereafter recorded as an Alliance MP rather than a NewLabour MP.
- Gilbert Myles and Hamish MacIntyre, the National Party MPs for Roskill and Manawatu, respectively, quit their party in 1991. They established a small group Liberal Party, which they eventually merged into the Alliance.
- Cam Campion, the National Party MP for Wanganui, announced his resignation from the party on 3 March 1993. He accused the party of attempting to rig the reselection process against him. Campion remained an independent for the remainder of the term.
- Winston Peters formed the New Zealand First party in 1993. He was joined in the party by Myles.

== Seating plan ==
=== Start of term ===
The chamber is in a horseshoe-shape.

Blincoe | Dalziel
Elder | Braybrooke
Wētere | Cullen
Gray
Falloon | East
Marshall | W. Peters
Gerard | Luxton

Sutherland | R. Robertson
Tennet | Hunt
Clark | Moore
McKinnon | BOLGER
Carter | Grant
Creech | O'Regan

Hawkins | Hodgson
Austin | Dunne
Caygill | Prebble
Birch | Richardson
Shipley | Cooper
McClay | Lee

Maharey | Swain
Gregory | Tirikatene-Sullivan
Tapsell | Wilde
Kidd | Burdon
Graham | L. Smith
Maxwell | Williamson

Tizard
Davies | Kelly
Lange | Matthewson
Upton | Banks
McTigue | Storey

Thomas | Steel | Sowry | Whittaker | Thorne
Anderton | J. Robertson | Revell | N. Smith
Neill | Neeson | Myles | Reeves | Ryall
Moir | I. Peters | Rogers
Meurant | Cliffe | Hilt | Quigley
Muldoon | Anderson | Kyd | Campion | Hasler | MacIntyre
McCully | Munro | Armstrong | Bradford | Hancock | McIntosh
English | Fletcher | Gresham | Kimber | Laws | McCardle
