= 40th New Zealand Parliament =

Term of the Parliament of New Zealand

40th Parliament of New Zealand
←	39th Parliament	41st Parliament	→
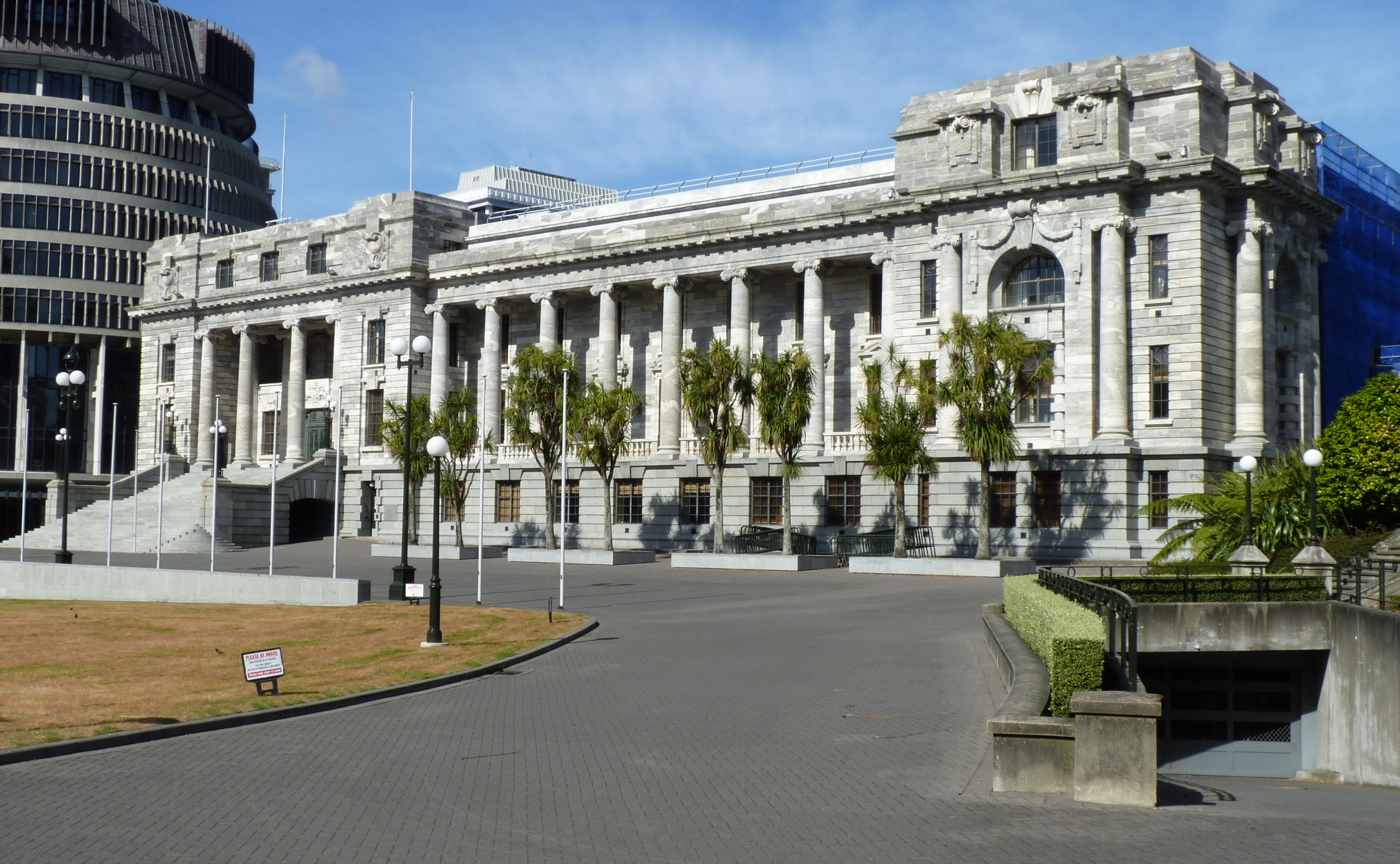
- Parliament House, Wellington

Overview
- Legislative body: New Zealand Parliament
- Term: 6 April 1982 – 14 June 1984
- Election: 1981 New Zealand general election
- Government: Third National Government

House of Representatives
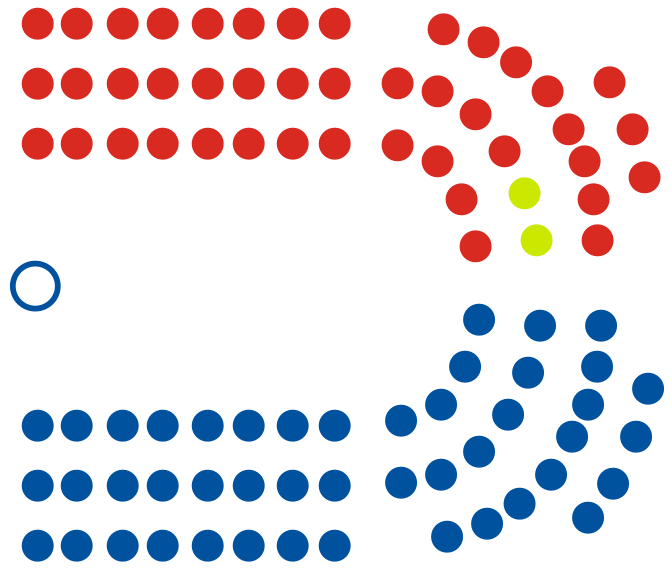
- Members: 92
- Speaker of the House: Richard Harrison
- Leader of the House: David Thomson
- Prime Minister: Robert Muldoon
- Leader of the Opposition: David Lange — Bill Rowling until 3 February 1983

Sovereign
- Monarch: Elizabeth II
- Governor-General: David Beattie

Sessions
- 1st: 6 April 1982 – 17 December 1982
- 2nd: 7 April 1983 – 16 December 1983
- 3rd: 31 May 1984 – 14 June 1984

The 40th New Zealand Parliament was a term of the Parliament of New Zealand. Its composition was determined by the 1981 election, and it sat until the 1984 election.

The 40th Parliament was the third and final term of the third National Party government. Robert Muldoon, who served as both Prime Minister and Minister of Finance, remained in power. The Labour Party, led by former Prime Minister Bill Rowling, had made significant gains (actually winning the largest portion of the popular vote), but remained in opposition. The Social Credit Party was the only other opposition party in the 40th Parliament, holding two seats.

The 40th Parliament consisted of ninety-two representatives, the same as in the previous election. All of these representatives were chosen by single-member geographical electorates, including four special Māori electorates.

== Electoral boundaries for the 40th Parliament ==
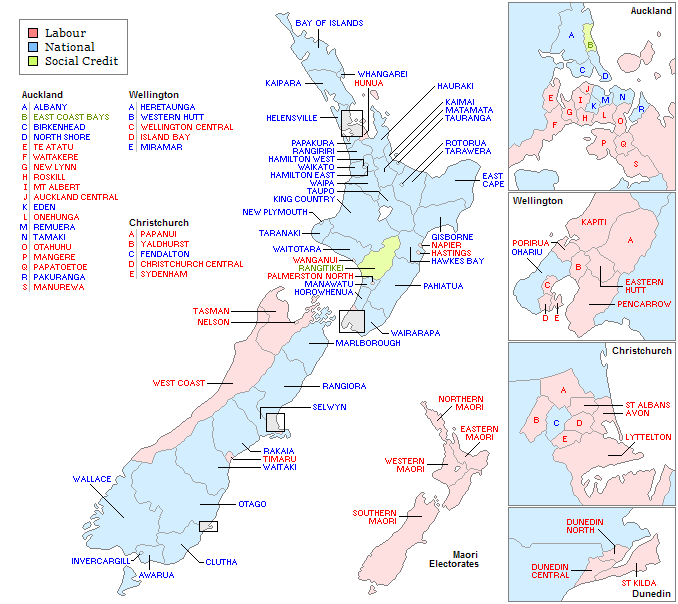

== Overview of seats ==
The table below shows the number of MPs in each party following the 1981 election and at dissolution:

Affiliation	Members	
Affiliation	At 1981 election	At dissolution
National	47	47
Government total	47	47
Labour	43	43
Social Credit	2	2
Government total	45	45
Total	92	92
Working Government majority	2	2

Notes

- The Working Government majority is calculated as all Government MPs less all other parties.

== Initial composition of the 40th Parliament ==
The tables below shows the results of the 1981 general election:

Key

National Labour Social Credit Mana Motuhake Independent

Electorate results for the 1981 New Zealand general election
Electorate	Incumbent	Winner	Majority	Runner up
General electorates
Albany	Don McKinnon		1,964	Bryan Mockridge
Ashburton	Rob Talbot		3,655	John Srhoy
Auckland Central	Richard Prebble		6,614	Dorice Reid
Avon	Mary Batchelor		7,820	Colin McNicholl
Awarua	Rex Austin		2,341	Dick Fitzgerald
Bay of Islands	Neill Austin		864	Les Hunter
Birkenhead	Jim McLay		2,104	Bill Smith
Christchurch Central	Geoffrey Palmer		7,028	Ian Wilson
Clutha	Robin Gray		661	Clive Matthewson
Dunedin Central	Brian MacDonell		4,169	Nancy Ruth King
Dunedin North	Stan Rodger		4,733	Des Bleach
East Cape	Duncan MacIntyre		1,964	Peter Dey
East Coast Bays	Gary Knapp		758	Don Brash
Eastern Hutt	Trevor Young		5.011	Alex Duthie
Eden	Aussie Malcolm		117	Ian Scott
Fendalton	Eric Holland	Philip Burdon	1,158	David Close
Gisborne	Bob Bell		150	Allan Wallbank (Note: Wallbank was first on election night for Gisborne, but lost on a recount.)
Hamilton East	Ian Shearer		1,188	Lois Welch
Hamilton West	Mike Minogue		1,477	Paddy McCaffrey
Hastings	David Butcher		1,845	Hamish Kynoch
Hauraki	Leo Schultz	Graeme Lee	1,787	Gordon Miller
Hawkes Bay	Richard Harrison		2,430	Mike Cullen
Helensville	Dail Jones		216	Jack Elder
Heretaunga	Ron Bailey	Bill Jeffries	2,233	Ronald Palmer
Horowhenua	Geoff Thompson		876	David Page
Hunua	Winston Peters	Colin Moyle	996	Winston Peters
Invercargill	Norman Jones		1,592	Dougal Soper
Island Bay	Frank O'Flynn		3,938	Doug Catley
Kaimai	Bruce Townshend		5,146	Douglas Conway
Kaipara	Peter Wilkinson		1,029	Nevern Connachy
Kapiti	Barry Brill	Margaret Shields	495	Barry Brill
King Country	Jim Bolger		2,158	Derek Mason
Lyttelton	Ann Hercus		3,892	Simon Stamers-Smith
Manawatu	Michael Cox		2,913	Dennis Kessell
Mangere	David Lange		5,806	John Pettit
Manurewa	Roger Douglas		2,815	Keith Ralph
Marlborough	Doug Kidd		1,643	Graeme Macann
Matamata	Jack Luxton		3,460	David Mawdsley
Miramar	Bill Young	Peter Neilson	649	Bill Young
Mount Albert	Warren Freer	Helen Clark	3,907	Warren W. Moyes
Napier	Gordon Christie	Geoff Braybrooke	3,009	Kevin Rose
Nelson	Mel Courtney (Note: Courtney had withdrawn from the Labour caucus in March 1981.)	Philip Woollaston	698	Mel Courtney
New Lynn	Jonathan Hunt		4,874	Ron Hanson
New Plymouth	Tony Friedlander		1,567	Dennis Duggan
North Shore	George Gair		3,969	Peter Chambers
Ohariu	Hugh Templeton		1,567	Norman Ely
Onehunga	Fred Gerbic		2,012	Sue Wood
Otago	Warren Cooper		4,893	Bryan Griffiths
Otahuhu	Bob Tizard		5,164	Stuart McDowell
Pahiatua	John Falloon		7,569	Bill Sutton
Pakuranga	Pat Hunt		783	Neil Morrison
Palmerston North	Joe Walding	Trevor de Cleene	2,110	Brian Elwood
Papakura	Merv Wellington		3,215	John Cheeseman
Papanui	Mike Moore		4,409	Brian Keeley
Papatoetoe	Eddie Isbey		1,689	Roy McKeen
Pencarrow	Fraser Colman		4,065	Willard Amaru
Porirua	Gerry Wall		3,639	Estelle Brittain
Rangiora	Derek Quigley		932	Chris Hayward
Rangiriri	Bill Birch		3,004	Roy Hayward
Rangitikei	Bruce Beetham		2,376	Paul Bardwell
Remuera	Allan Highet		5,105	Judith Tizard
Roskill	Arthur Faulkner	Phil Goff	2,525	Cheryl Parsons
Rotorua	Paul East		1,544	Johnny W Lepper
St Albans	David Caygill		4,926	Jim Baker
St Kilda	Bill Fraser	Michael Cullen	3,579	Stuart Clark
Selwyn	Colin McLachlan	Ruth Richardson	2,129	Bill Woods
Sydenham	John Kirk		5,594	Richard Bach
Tamaki	Robert Muldoon		5,153	Richard Northey
Taranaki	David Thomson		4,470	Brian Heilihy
Tarawera	Ian McLean		2,442	Noel Scott
Tasman	Bill Rowling		2,246	Ted Krammer
Taupo	Jack Ridley	Roger McClay (Note: McClay was declared elected by the High Court after an electoral petition.)	36	Jack Ridley
Tauranga	Keith Allen		2,232	Paul Hills
Te Atatu	Michael Bassett		3,330	Stella Noble
Timaru	Sir Basil Arthur		1,850	Jane Coughlan
Waikato	Lance Adams-Schneider	Simon Upton	4,661	Noel Johnston
Waipa	Marilyn Waring		2,768	John Kilbride
Wairarapa	Ben Couch		1,546	Tom Gemmell
Waitakere	Ralph Maxwell		2,883	Martin Gummer
Waitaki	Jonathan Elworthy		305	Jim Sutton
Waitotara	Venn Young		2,784	Sam Gray
Wallace	Brian Talboys	Derek Angus	6,558	Owen Horton
Wanganui	Russell Marshall		1,668	Terry Heffernan
Wellington Central	Ken Comber	Fran Wilde	1,283	Ken Comber
West Coast	Kerry Burke		4,406	Doug Truman
Western Hutt	John Terris		1,420	John Tanner
Whangarei	John Elliott	John Banks	1,743	Maurice Penney
Yaldhurst	Mick Connelly		1,962	Margaret Murray
Māori electorates
Eastern Maori	Paraone Reweti	Peter Tapsell	6,232	Albert Tahana
Northern Maori	Bruce Gregory		3,541	Matiu Rata
Southern Maori	Whetu Tirikatene-Sullivan		8,665	Amster Reedy
Western Maori	Koro Wētere		8,624	Eva Rickard

Table footnotes:

There were no by-elections held during the term of the 40th Parliament.
