= 42nd New Zealand Parliament =

Term of the Parliament of New Zealand

42nd Parliament of New Zealand
| ← | 41st Parliament | 43rd Parliament | → |
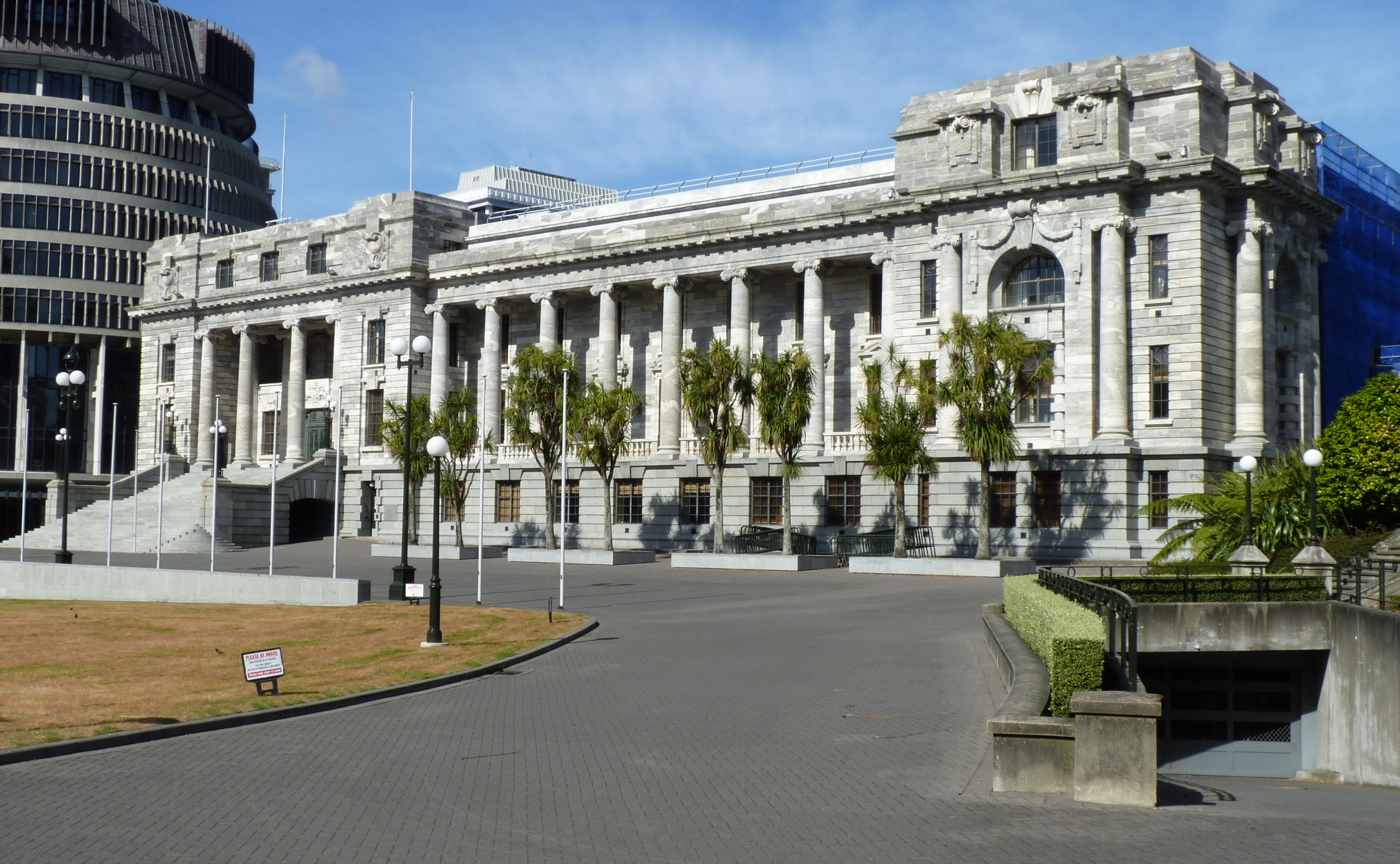
- Parliament House, Wellington

Overview
- Legislative body: New Zealand Parliament
- Term: 16 September 1987 – 6 September 1990
- Election: 1987 New Zealand general election
- Government: Fourth Labour Government

House of Representatives
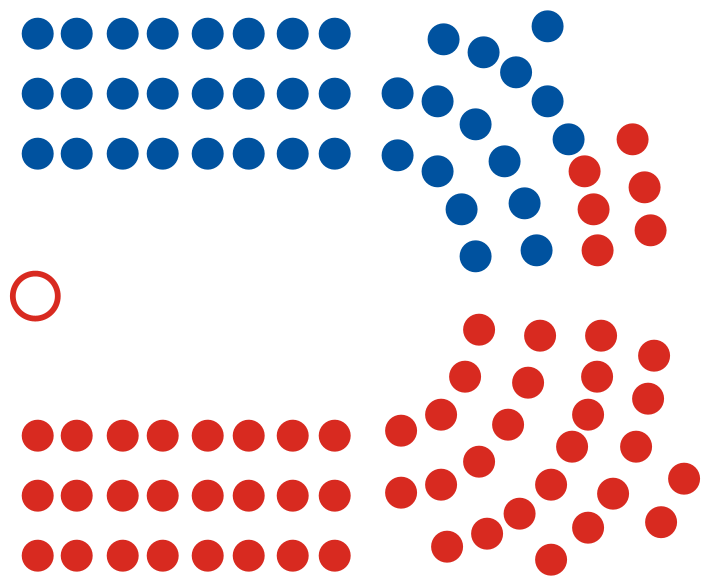
- Members: 97
- Speaker of the House: Kerry Burke
- Leader of the House: Jonathan Hunt
- Prime Minister: Mike Moore — Geoffrey Palmer until 3 September 1990 — David Lange until 8 August 1989
- Leader of the Opposition: Jim Bolger

Sovereign
- Monarch: Elizabeth II
- Governor-General: Paul Reeves

Sessions
- 1st: 16 September 1987 – 12 December 1989
- 2nd: 14 February 1990 – 6 September 1990

The 42nd New Zealand Parliament was a term of the New Zealand Parliament. Its composition was determined by the 1987 election, and it sat until the 1990 election.

The 42nd Parliament was the second (and final) term of the controversial fourth Labour Party government. Initially, the only other party in the 42nd Parliament was the National Party, with the Democratic Party having lost the two seats it held in the 41st Parliament. Later, a dissident Labour MP, Jim Anderton, would found the NewLabour Party in 1989. Due to internal disputes within the Labour Party, there were three Prime Ministers during the 42nd Parliament: David Lange, Geoffrey Palmer, and Mike Moore.

The 42nd Parliament consisted of ninety-seven representatives. At the time, this was the highest number of representatives that Parliament had had, although it would later be exceeded. All of these representatives were chosen by single-member geographical electorates, including four Māori electorates.

== Electoral boundaries for the 42nd Parliament ==
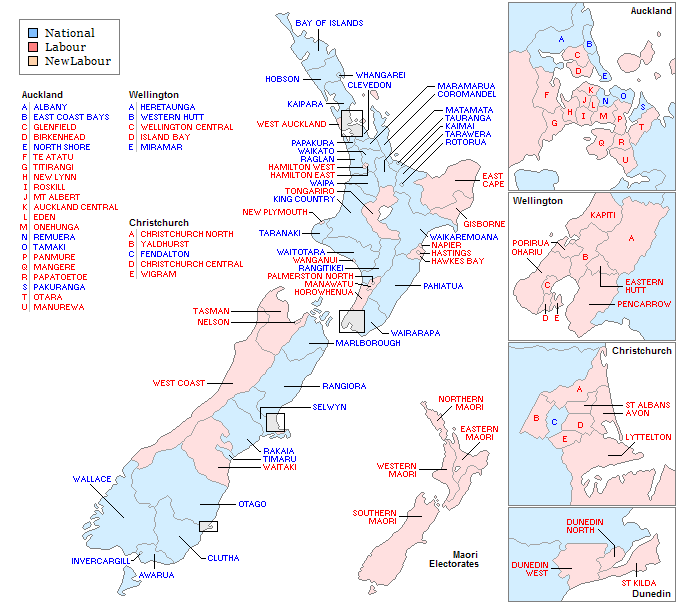

== Overview of seats ==
The table below shows the number of MPs in each party following the 1987 election and at dissolution:

| Affiliation | Members | |
| Affiliation | At 1987 election | At dissolution |
|---|---|---|
| Labour | 57 | 56 |
| Government total | 57 | 56 |
| National | 40 | 40 |
| NewLabour | Not yet founded | 1 |
| Opposition total | 40 | 41 |
| Total | 97 | 97 |
| Working Government majority | 17 | 15 |

Notes

- The Working Government majority is calculated as all Government MPs less all other parties.

== Initial composition of the 42nd Parliament ==
The tables below shows the results of the 1987 general election:

Key

Labour National Democrats Mana Motuhake

Electorate results for the 1987 New Zealand general election
| Electorate | Incumbent | Winner | Majority | Runner up |
|---|---|---|---|---|
General electorates
| Albany | New electorate | Don McKinnon | 1,658 | Chris Carter |
| Ashburton | Rob Talbot | Jenny Shipley | 4,935 | Ian Maxwell |
| Auckland Central | Richard Prebble | | 7,355 | Stephen Mayer |
| Avon | Mary Batchelor | Larry Sutherland | 6,322 | Wendy Rush |
| Awarua | Rex Austin | Jeff Grant | 2,480 | Heather Simpson |
| Bay of Islands | Neill Austin | John Carter | 2,123 | Chris Robertson |
| Birkenhead | Jim McLay | Jenny Kirk | 2,220 | Barry Gustafson |
| Christchurch Central | Geoffrey Palmer | | 6,805 | Graham Burnett |
| Christchurch North | Mike Moore | | 4,698 | Brendan McNeill |
| Clevedon | New electorate | Warren Kyd | 827 | Lee Goffin |
| Clutha | Robin Gray | | 5,541 | Holly Russell |
| Coromandel | New electorate | Graeme Lee | 3,765 | Alasdair Thompson |
| Dunedin North | Stan Rodger | | 6,534 | Sean Davison |
| Dunedin West | Clive Matthewson | | 4,547 | Ian McMeeking |
| East Cape | Anne Fraser | | 246 | Wira Gardiner |
| East Coast Bays | Gary Knapp | Murray McCully | 311 | Gary Knapp |
| Eastern Hutt | Trevor Young | | 4,740 | Penn Pattison |
| Eden | Richard Northey | | 3,404 | Hiwi Tauroa |
| Fendalton | Philip Burdon | | 311 | Neil Cherry |
| Gisborne | Allan Wallbank | | 2,759 | Georgina Tattersfield |
| Glenfield | Judy Keall | | 1,900 | David Schnauer |
| Hamilton East | Bill Dillon | | 1,671 | Sandra Shearer |
| Hamilton West | Trevor Mallard | | 1,235 | Doug Simes |
| Hastings | David Butcher | | 2,307 | Jeff Whittaker |
| Hawkes Bay | Bill Sutton | | 859 | Michael Laws |
| Heretaunga | Bill Jeffries | | 2,554 | John Allen |
| Hobson | New electorate | Ross Meurant | 4,998 | I J Melville |
| Horowhenua | Annette King | | 1,550 | Geoff Thompson |
| Invercargill | Norman Jones | Rob Munro | 552 | David Soper |
| Island Bay | Frank O'Flynn | Elizabeth Tennet | 7,313 | Sandra Clarke |
| Kaimai | Bruce Townshend | Robert Anderson | 2,307 | Henry Uttinger |
| Kaipara | Lockwood Smith | | 5,797 | Irene Hutchings |
| Kapiti | Margaret Shields | | 2,760 | Roger Sowry |
| King Country | Jim Bolger | | 5,954 | Leo Menefy |
| Lyttelton | Ann Hercus | Peter Simpson | 3,733 | Philip Hall |
| Manawatu | Michael Cox | David Robinson | 131 | Michael Cox (Note: Cox was first on election night for Manawatu, but lost when special votes were included) |
| Mangere | David Lange | | 6,019 | Ron Jeffery |
| Manurewa | Roger Douglas | | 3,052 | George Cunningham |
| Maramarua | New electorate | Bill Birch | 5,729 | Brian Dent |
| Marlborough | Doug Kidd | | 2,402 | Barbara Hutchison |
| Matamata | Jack Luxton | John Luxton | 6,926 | D W McGregor |
| Miramar | Peter Neilsen | | 4,061 | Ian Macfarlane |
| Mount Albert | Helen Clark | | 5,337 | Rob Wheeler |
| Napier | Geoff Braybrooke | | 5,425 | Ashley Church |
| Nelson | Philip Woollaston | | 5,467 | Bob Straight |
| New Lynn | Jonathan Hunt | | 4,369 | Dick Berry |
| New Plymouth | Tony Friedlander | Harry Duynhoven | 337 | Tony Friedlander |
| North Shore | George Gair | | 920 | Graeme Ransom |
| Ohariu | Peter Dunne | | 4,492 | David Lloyd |
| Onehunga | Fred Gerbic | | 3,329 | Andrew Stanley |
| Otago | Warren Cooper | | 1,961 | Calvin Fisher |
| Otara | Colin Moyle | | 2,409 | Trevor Rogers |
| Pahiatua | John Falloon | | 2,083 | Margo Martindale |
| Pakuranga | Neil Morrison | Maurice Williamson | 2,018 | Neil Morrison |
| Palmerston North | Trevor de Cleene | | 3,237 | Paul Curry |
| Panmure | Bob Tizard | | 4,247 | T J C Elliott |
| Papakura | Merv Wellington | | 2,894 | Geoff Summers |
| Papatoetoe | Eddie Isbey | Ross Robertson | 2,689 | Howard Martin |
| Pencarrow | Fraser Colman | Sonja Davies | 1,851 | Andrew Harvey |
| Porirua | Gerry Wall | Graham Kelly | 3,531 | Arthur Leonard Gadsby |
| Raglan | Simon Upton | | 3,271 | Olivia Scarletti-Longley |
| Rangiora | Jim Gerard | | 2,132 | Chris Constable |
| Rangitikei | Denis Marshall | | 4,039 | Bruce Beetham |
| Remuera | Doug Graham | | 406 | Judith Tizard |
| Roskill | Phil Goff | | 2,437 | Bob Foulkes |
| Rotorua | Paul East | | 2,425 | Rosemary Michie |
| St Albans | David Caygill | | 4,521 | Andrew Cowie |
| St Kilda | Michael Cullen | | 5,692 | Lyndon Weggery |
| Selwyn | Ruth Richardson | | 2,962 | Bill Woods |
| Sydenham | Jim Anderton (Note: Jim Anderton defected to New Labour in 1989.) | | 6,436 | Judith Harrington |
| Tamaki | Robert Muldoon | | 1,947 | Carl Harding |
| Taranaki | Roger Maxwell | | 6,313 | Patrick Jackson |
| Tarawera | Ian McLean | | 3,577 | Malcolm Moore |
| Tasman | Ken Shirley | | 1,012 | Gerald Hunt |
| Tauranga | Winston Peters | | 2,451 | Jenny Seddon |
| Te Atatu | Michael Bassett | | 2,249 | Brian Neeson |
| Timaru | Maurice McTigue | | 857 | Gary Clarke |
| Titirangi | New electorate | Ralph Maxwell | 3,954 | John McIntosh |
| Tongariro | Noel Scott | | 2,370 | Ian Peters |
| Waikaremoana | Roger McClay | | 3,810 | T K Stewart |
| Waikato | Rob Storey | | 4,155 | Bruce Raitt |
| Waipa | Katherine O'Regan | | 6,303 | L F Holmes |
| Wairarapa | Reg Boorman | Wyatt Creech (Note: Creech was declared elected by the High Court after an Electoral Petition) | 34 | Reg Boorman |
| Waitaki | Jim Sutton | | 89 | Duncan Taylor |
| Waitotara | Venn Young | | 5,949 | Rachel Stewart |
| Wallace | Derek Angus | | 7,594 | Barry Julian |
| Wanganui | Russell Marshall | | 248 | Terry Heffernan |
| Wellington Central | Fran Wilde | | 5,191 | John Feast |
| West Auckland | Jack Elder | | 2,844 | Ben Couch |
| West Coast | Kerry Burke | | 1,480 | Gordon Garwood |
| Western Hutt | John Terris | | 3,548 | Joy McLauchlan |
| Whangārei | John Banks | | 3,687 | Edna Tait |
| Yaldhurst | Margaret Austin | | 2,542 | James Bacon |
Māori electorates
| Eastern Maori | Peter Tapsell | | 8,696 | Amster Reedy |
| Northern Maori | Bruce Gregory | | 3,529 | Matiu Rata |
| Southern Maori | Whetu Tirikatene-Sullivan | | 8,848 | Tikirau Stevens |
| Western Maori | Koro Wētere | | 8,129 | Eva Rickard |

Table footnotes:

== Changes during term ==
=== By-elections ===
There were no by-elections held during the term of the 42nd Parliament.

=== Party affiliation changes ===
| Name | Year | Seat | From | To |
|---|---|---|---|---|
| Jim Anderton | 1989 | Sydenham | Labour | NewLabour |

Jim Anderton, the Labour MP for Sydenham, quit the Labour Party in protest in 1989 over the economic reforms, known as Rogernomics, of Roger Douglas, the Minister of Finance. He established the NewLabour Party.

== Seating plan ==
=== Start of term ===
The chamber is in a horseshoe-shape.

| Angus | Gair | Wellington | Lee | Storey | Roger Maxwell | Gerard | D. Marshall | McCully | Meurant | Munro | Shipley | Williamson |
| V. Young | Smith | McTigue | Gray | Banks | Graham | McClay | O'Regan | Muldoon | Anderson | Carter | Grant | Robinson | Robertson | Tennet |
| Kidd | East | McKinnon | Bolger | Birch | Richardson | Falloon | Peters | Burdon | Upton | McLean | | Kyd | Kirk | Sutherland |
| | | | | | | | | | | | Cooper | Luxton | Kelly | Simpson |
| Burke |
| | | | | | | | | | | | Dunne | Gregory | Matthewson | Wallbank |
| Wētere | Prebble | Palmer | LANGE | Moore | Douglas | Caygill | R. Marshall | de Cleene | Woollaston | Neilson | | T. Young | Keall | J. Sutton |
| Tizard | Moyle | Mallard | Austin | Hunt | Bassett | Rodger | Goff | Gerbic | King | Ralph Maxwell | Tirikatene-Sullivan | Elder | Fraser | B. Sutton | Duynhoven |
| Terris | Jeffries | Tapsell | Shields | Clark | Cullen | Butcher | Wilde | Braybrooke | Anderton | Boorman | Dillon | Northey | Scott | Shirley | Davies |
