= Frank Grover =

New Zealand politician

Member of the New Zealand Parliament for Alliance party list
- In office 1996–1999

Personal details
- Born: 19 March 1940 (age 86) Auckland, New Zealand
- Party: National (to 1991); Liberal (1991–1996); Alliance (1996–1999); Christian Heritage (1999)
- Other political affiliations: Christian Democrat

Frank Grover (born 19 March 1940) is a former New Zealand politician. He was an MP from 1996 to 1999, representing first the Alliance and then the Christian Heritage Party in the House of Representatives.

== Early life ==
Grover was born in Auckland on 19 March 1940, the son of Madge Grover (née Troutbeck) and Percival Gordon Grover. Before entering politics, Grover had a background in law, having received an LLB from University of Auckland. He worked as a magistrate in Hong Kong from 1979 to 1983.

== Political career ==
=== The Liberals ===
Grover was originally a member of the National Party, but became disillusioned with National's economic policy under Minister of Finance Ruth Richardson. Richardson promoted strong free market economic theories, which were popular with some sections of the party, but resented by more conservative elements. Gilbert Myles and Hamish McIntyre, two National MPs who believed that Richardson's reforms were deeply harmful to society, split from the party in 1992, founding the new Liberal Party. Grover was one of those who accompanied them.

Soon afterwards, the Liberals chose to join the Alliance, a broad left-wing coalition which they saw as the most significant opponent of Richardson and her allies. Some members of the Liberals, quite possibly including Grover, were unhappy at this decision, however – while they opposed Richardson's reforms, they did not see themselves as left-wing. Following the failure of either Myles or McIntyre to be re-elected, Myles decamped to the newly founded New Zealand First party and McIntyre retired. Grover assumed the leadership of the Liberals in 1994.

=== Member of Parliament ===
New Zealand Parliament
Years	Term	Electorate	List	Party
1996–1999	45th	List	5	Alliance
1999	Changed allegiance to:			Christian Heritage

Grover was elected to Parliament in the 1996 election as an Alliance list MP. He disagreed with the Alliance on a number of issues, however, and on 11 June 1999, not long before the 1999 election, he officially quit the Alliance to join the Christian Heritage Party. This gave the CHP its only ever seat in Parliament. In 1998 Grover had indicated that he would stand for the Christian Democrat Party, but when they became Future New Zealand he decided to join the CHP instead. Grover's switches was strongly criticised by other parties, particularly the Alliance but also New Zealand First, which had also experienced defections. For the election, Grover was ranked sixth on Christian Heritage's list, but the party failed to win any seats. Grover therefore left Parliament.
