= Deborah Morris-Travers =

New Zealand politician (born 1970)

The Honourable Deborah Morris-Travers
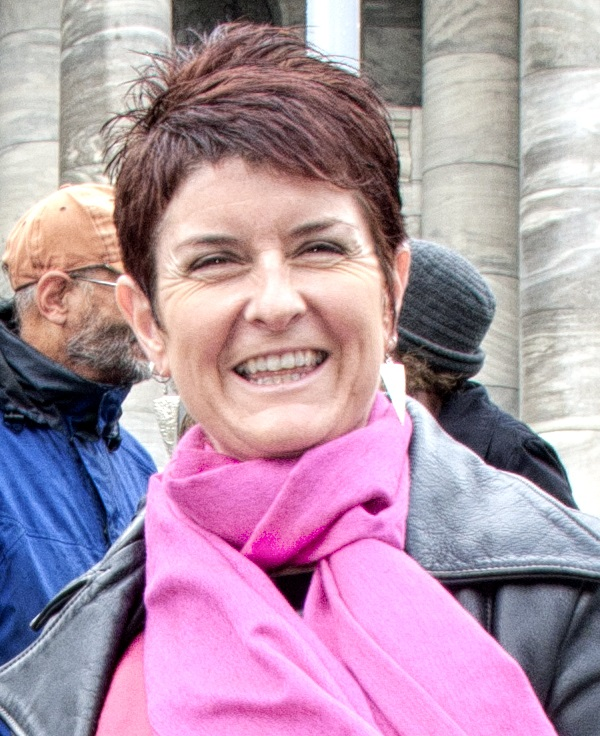

5th Minister for Youth
- In office 18 December 1996 – 31 August 1998
- Prime Minister: Jim Bolger; Jenny Shipley
- Preceded by: Katherine O'Regan
- Succeeded by: Tony Ryall

Member of the New Zealand Parliament for List
- In office 12 December 1996 – 20 December 1998

Parliamentary chief of staff for the Green Party of Aotearoa New Zealand
- In office 2016–2017
- Preceded by: Andrew Campbell
- Succeeded by: Tory Whanau

Personal details
- Born: 1970 (age 55–56)
- Party: New Zealand First; Independent

Deborah Morris-Travers (born 9 August 1970) is a former New Zealand politician. She was a list MP for New Zealand First from 1996 to 1998.

== Member of Parliament ==
New Zealand Parliament
Years	Term	Electorate	List	Party
1996–1998	45th	List	9	NZ First
1998	Changed allegiance to:			Independent

Morris was an MP from 1996 to 1998, representing the New Zealand First party. She was first elected to Parliament in the 1996 election as a list MP, and when her party formed a coalition with the National Party, she became a Minister. Her most prominent role was as Minister of Youth Affairs, where her own relative youth was seen as an asset – she was understood to be the youngest person ever appointed to ministerial rank (at the age of 26). In 1996 she caused controversy by suggesting that young New Zealanders should have better access to contraceptives. Her suggestion was publicly opposed by the Governor-General Sir Michael Hardie Boys.

When the coalition collapsed, and New Zealand First itself began to split up, Morris was one of the first MPs to leave the party, saying that she could no longer accept the "perpetual state of crisis" generated by its leader, Winston Peters. Unlike some other New Zealand First defectors, Morris did not make a deal with the National Party to keep her ministerial portfolios, resigning from her position on 18 August 1998. Morris remained an independent until her resignation from Parliament on 20 December 1998. As she had been elected on the New Zealand First list, her replacement, Gilbert Myles, was also drawn from that list.

== Life after politics ==
Since leaving Parliament, Morris has worked in public relations and as an advocate for New Zealand children. After time living and working overseas on disarmament issues with the International Campaign to Ban Landmines, she returned to New Zealand to work for non-governmental organisations. She worked at Plunket, Barnardo's, Save the Children and UNICEF New Zealand, leading the movement for children. She helped establish Every Child Counts and then the Tick4Kids networks, working to get child abuse and child poverty onto the public agenda. In 2007, she was awarded the Vodafone World of Difference grant. She lent her support for the controversial repeal of Section 59, which removed the defence of reasonable force in child discipline.

At the 2013 local authority elections Morris-Travers stood for, and was elected to, the Paraparaumu Raumati Community Board.

In 2016, Deborah Morris-Travers delivered her Ted talk to TedX Wellington.

She later became the Green Party Chief of Staff. In 2017, she left her position as Chief of Staff due to disagreements over Metiria Turei's public admission to historical benefit and electoral fraud which eventually caused a loss of support for the party and led to Turei's resignation. Later Morris ruled out a bid for the co-leadership in the election to replace Turei. She was replaced in her role by then-digital director Tory Whanau.

== Republicanism and electoral reform ==
In 1994, Morris was a founding member of the Republican Movement of Aotearoa New Zealand, and supports a New Zealand republic. She was also part of the campaign for proportional representation, achieving MMP.
