= Dianne Yates =

New Zealand politician (born 1943)

Member of the New Zealand Parliament for Hamilton East
- In office 6 November 1993 – 12 October 1996
- Preceded by: Tony Steel
- Succeeded by: Tony Steel
- In office 27 July 2002 – 17 September 2005
- Preceded by: Tony Steel
- Succeeded by: David Bennett
- Majority: 614 (1.94%)

Member of the New Zealand Parliament for Labour Party list
- In office 12 October 1996 – 27 July 2002
- In office 17 September 2005 – 28 March 2008
- Succeeded by: William Sio (Note: Normally, list MPs do not have individual predecessors or successors, but Yates resigned during a sitting parliament and therefore was succeeded by Sio.)

Personal details
- Born: 29 November 1943 (age 82)

Dianne Fae Yates (born 29 November 1943) is a former New Zealand politician. She was a Labour Party Member of Parliament from 1993 to 2008.

== Early life and career ==
Yates was born in 1943 to parents Joy (née Hinton) and Frederick Yates, a builder, and raised on a farm outside Hamilton. She has one brother.

Yates trained as a teacher and also completed a Bachelor of Arts at Victoria University of Wellington and a Master of Education at Howard University in Washington, D.C. She worked as a teacher and education administrator in New Zealand, the United Kingdom, and Zimbabwe. In the 1970s, she worked on the television programme Country Calendar. Before entering Parliament, she worked as a continuing education officer at the University of Waikato.

Yates is divorced and has no children.

== Member of Parliament ==
New Zealand Parliament
Years	Term	Electorate	List	Party
1993–1996	44th	Hamilton East		Labour
1996–1999	45th	List	16	Labour
1999–2002	46th	List	22	Labour
2002–2005	47th	Hamilton East	29	Labour
2005–2008	48th	List	28	Labour

Yates joined the Labour Party in the 1970s. She was selected as the party's candidate in the marginal Hamilton East electorate for the 1993 election, where she defeated Tony Steel, who had won the seat for National three years prior, by an 80-vote margin. Yates and Steel were electoral rivals for four elections, trading Hamilton East between them until Steel's retirement upon defeat at the 2002 general election (Yates won the electorate by 614 votes). Although she was unsuccessful in Hamilton East in 1996, 1999, and 2005, she was returned as a list MP each time.

Yates sat on the justice and law reform committee from 1993 to 1999. She was not appointed a minister in the Fifth Labour Government, which held power in Yates' final three terms, but was highly active as a legislator with five private member's bills—mostly related to women's rights—considered by Parliament during her career. She held three select committee chairs: government administration from 1999 to 2005; foreign affairs, defence and trade from 2005 to 2008; and education and science in 2008. She was also deputy chair of the regulations review committee from 1999 to 2005 and a member of the health committee from 2002 to 2005.

=== Women's rights advocacy and legislation ===
In the Labour Party opposition led by Helen Clark, Yates was Labour's spokesperson for women's affairs. She was outspoken on some issues regarding technology, such as cloning and in vitro fertilisation, because of their potential impact on women and children. In her maiden statement, given on 15 March 1994, she stated: "We may be successful in breeding sheep and cattle for sale, but we must not breed human babies for sale... We could breed a nation of muscle-bound athletes; we could even classify our babies for various field events prior to their birth. If we are able to alter the muscle-to-fat ratio of cattle, what might we do to humans?"

Yates promoted a private member's bill "to ban cloning" and regulate assisted reproductive procedures in 1996, which was eventually passed as the Human Assisted Reproductive Technology Act 2004. The bill was based on the British Human Fertilisation and Embryology Act 1990. Yates said she came to the issue from a "radical feminist" perspective; while speaking on the bill in Parliament, she suggested the bill could do away with sexual intercourse for reproductive, but not recreational, purposes and that New Zealand needed "at most eight fit human males with high sperm counts" to replenish its population. She also advocated for a national register of to give children conceived through donation information about their genetic parents.

Yates was a supporter of paid parental leave and drafted legislation to provide a new parent with six weeks of paid time off. Ultimately her bill was not required as a more generous bill from Laila Harré, proposing twelve weeks, was supported by parliament in 1997. She was also active on alcohol safety reform for pregnant people. In 1999, she proposed amendments to government legislation that would have required all alcohol containers to carry warning labels including "Women should not drink liquor during pregnancy because of the risk of birth defects." The amendments lost by a single vote. Yates brought the amendments again, as a private member's bill, the following year. The wording of the warnings were criticised by Attorney-General Margaret Wilson as being broader in wording and application than strictly necessary. Yates' bill was defeated at its first reading on 11 October 2000.

Electoral reform, and the potential for this to support the election of women, was another focus of Yates' career. She was a member of the Women's Electoral Lobby and Electoral Reform Coalition prior to her election as a Labour MP and supported the adoption of proportional representation. In her second term, she inherited the Local Elections (Single Transferable Vote Option) Bill from her defeated colleague Richard Northey. The bill proposed letting local authorities choose the single transferable vote electoral system for their elections. In the final parliament elected under the first-past-the-post voting system, the bill had been sent to the electoral reform subcommittee, which unanimously recommended its passage. However, the bill was eventually defeated in the first mixed-member proportional parliament, 57–63, in August 1998. The bill was later revived by Rod Donald and incorporated into the Local Electoral Act 2001.

Yates was a strong opponent of prostitution reform, describing prostitution as exploitation and the Prostitution Reform Bill that was debated between 2000 and 2003 as a tool to "protect brothels, brothel-keepers and the clients [and to] provide nice, clean brothels so that clients can go home to their wives undetected as to where they spent the night." During consideration of the bill, she unsuccessfully proposed an amendment seeking to criminalise clients rather than prostitutes. The bill passed by a single vote; after it was enacted, Yates lobbied Hamilton City Council to create a local bylaw banning prostitution in the city's suburbs.

Yates also sought to progress legislation on date rape drugs (which was incorporated into government legislation) and the practice of docking dogs' tails (which was abandoned after support for the change dissipated between the bill's first and second readings). As chair of the government administration committee, she led inquiries into the leaky building crisis and hate speech in New Zealand. She voted in favour of civil union legislation in 2004 and retaining or restoring an alcohol purchase age of 20 years in 1999 and 2006. She has a mixed record on euthanasia: voting in favour of a "death with dignity" bill in 1995 and against another in 2003. She was an opponent of the compulsory retirement savings scheme proposed by Winston Peters and defeated by a referendum in 1997, saying the way the scheme had been designed was "paternalistic."

=== Retirement ===
Yates contested Hamilton East for the fifth time in the 2005 election, but lost the seat to new National candidate David Bennett by a significant 5,298 votes. She was returned as a list MP. In August 2007, she announced that she would retire from Parliament by the end of the year in order to stand for the Hamilton City Council. She was unsuccessful in the election, finishing 7th—the top-polling unsuccessful candidate in her ward.

Yates' loss deferred her planned parliamentary retirement by several months. She gave her valedictory statement to Parliament on 19 March 2008 and left Parliament on 29 March 2008. Although Louisa Wall had been previously reported as Yates' replacement as a Labour Party list MP, Wall had entered Parliament early as a replacement for Ann Hartley. Instead, William Sio was named Yates' successor.

Following her retirement from Parliament, Yates was appointed to four government boards: Food Standards Australia New Zealand, Trust Waikato, Learning Media and Waikato Institute of Technology.

== Notes ==
New Zealand Parliament
Preceded by Tony Steel	Member of Parliament for Hamilton East; 1993–1996; 2002–2005	Succeeded by Tony Steel
Preceded by Tony Steel	Member of Parliament for Hamilton East; 1993–1996; 2002–2005	Succeeded by David Bennett
