= Tony Steel =

NZ international rugby union player

Member of the New Zealand Parliament for Hamilton East
- In office 27 October 1990 – 8 November 1993
- Preceded by: Bill Dillon
- Succeeded by: Dianne Yates
- In office 12 October 1996 – 27 July 2002
- Preceded by: Dianne Yates
- Succeeded by: Dianne Yates

5th Headmaster of Hamilton Boys' High School
- In office 1980–1989
- Preceded by: Richard Taylor
- Succeeded by: James Bennett

Personal details
- Born: Anthony Gordon Steel; 31 July 1941 Greymouth, New Zealand
- Died: 4 May 2018 (aged 76) Hamilton, New Zealand
- Party: National
- Relatives: Jack Steel (uncle)
- Education: Christchurch Boys' High School
- Occupation: Schoolteacher
- Sports career
- Sport: Track and field
- Event: Sprints

Sports achievements and titles
- National finals: 100 yd champion (1965, 1966); 220 yd champion (1965, 1966)
- Height: 1.80 m (5 ft 11 in)
- Weight: 82 kg (181 lb)

Rugby union career
- Position: Wing
International career
Years	Team	Apps	(Points)
1966–1968	New Zealand	23	(60)

Anthony Gordon Steel (31 July 1941 – 4 May 2018) was a New Zealand rugby union player, politician and educator.

== Early years ==
He was born in Greymouth, and played rugby first for his school, Christchurch Boys' High School, and then for Canterbury before finally playing for the All Blacks between 1966 and 1968. He was a part of the All Blacks 1967 New Zealand rugby union tour of Britain, France and Canada.

After retiring from sport due to injury, he took up teaching, first at the Brisbane Grammar School and then back in New Zealand. He eventually became headmaster of Hamilton Boys' High School.

== Member of Parliament ==
New Zealand Parliament
Years	Term	Electorate		Party
1990–1993	43rd	Hamilton East		National
1996–1999	45th	Hamilton East	44	National
1999–2002	46th	Hamilton East	none	National

In the 1990 election, he stood for Parliament as a candidate for the National Party, defeating Labour's Bill Dillon in the Hamilton East electorate. In the 1993 election, however, he was defeated by Labour's Dianne Yates. He regained the seat in the 1996 election, and retained it in the 1999 election, but in the 2002 election, he was defeated again by Dianne Yates. Having opted not to seek a position on National's party list, Steel left Parliament. Testament to Steel's popularity in the city of Hamilton is the fact that he lost what has traditionally been regarded as a bellwether seat by a mere 600 votes, in an election where the National Party was almost destroyed by its lowest polling result in recent history.

== Death ==
Steel died in Hamilton on 4 May 2018.

== Legacy ==
In 2000, an extra house was added at Hamilton Boys' High School, named Steel house, after Tony Steel. Apart from Argyle House (the boarding house), all of the other houses are also named after former Headmasters. Tony Steel also won the New Zealand 100/200 metres Sprint double at the 1965-66 New Zealand Track and Field Championships representing Canterbury as well as being a member of the winning Canterbury 4×100 metres Team that took Gold.

== See also ==
- High School Old Boys RFC

New Zealand Parliament
Preceded by Bill Dillon	Member of Parliament for Hamilton East; 1990–1993; 1996–2002	Succeeded by Dianne Yates
Preceded by Dianne Yates	Member of Parliament for Hamilton East; 1990–1993; 1996–2002	Succeeded by Dianne Yates
