= Koro Wētere =

New Zealand politician (1935–2018)

The Honourable Koro Wētere CBE

35th Minister of Māori Affairs
- In office 26 July 1984 – 2 November 1990
- Prime Minister: David Lange; Geoffrey Palmer; Mike Moore
- Preceded by: Ben Couch
- Succeeded by: Winston Peters

39th Minister of Lands
- In office 26 July 1984 – 16 September 1987
- Prime Minister: David Lange
- Preceded by: Jonathan Elworthy
- Succeeded by: Peter Tapsell

21st Minister of Forestry
- In office 26 July 1984 – 24 July 1987
- Prime Minister: David Lange
- Preceded by: Jonathan Elworthy
- Succeeded by: Peter Tapsell

Member of the New Zealand Parliament for Western Maori
- In office 29 November 1969 – 12 October 1996
- Preceded by: Iriaka Rātana
- Succeeded by: Electorate abolished

Personal details
- Born: Koro Tainui Wētere; 22 June 1935 Oparure, New Zealand
- Died: 23 June 2018 (aged 83) Te Kūiti, New Zealand
- Party: Labour
- Spouse: Nedracita Takuora Edwards (m. 1960)
- Children: 5
- Relatives: Nanaia Mahuta (niece); Simon Bridges

Koro Tainui Wētere CBE (22 June 1935 – 23 June 2018) was a New Zealand politician. He was an MP from 1969 to 1996, representing the Labour Party. He served as Minister of Māori Affairs in the Fourth Labour Government (1984–1990).

== Biography ==
=== Early life and family ===
Born at Oparure, near Te Kūiti, on 22 June 1935, Wētere was the son of Weo Maruatara Wētere and Te Aorangi Wētere (née Eketone), and affiliated to the Ngāti Maniapoto iwi. He was educated at Te Kūiti High School and Massey University, and was ordained a minister (āpotoro rēhita or registered apostle) of the Rātana Church, serving as parish minister for Oparure, Te Kūiti and Piopio in the 1960s.

In 1960, Wētere married Nedracita Takuora Edwards, and the couple went on to have five children.

=== Member of Parliament ===
New Zealand Parliament
Years	Term	Electorate	Party
1969–1972	36th	Western Maori	Labour
1972–1975	37th	Western Maori	Labour
1975–1978	38th	Western Maori	Labour
1978–1981	39th	Western Maori	Labour
1981–1984	40th	Western Maori	Labour
1984–1987	41st	Western Maori	Labour
1987–1990	42nd	Western Maori	Labour
1990–1993	43rd	Western Maori	Labour
1993–1996	44th	Western Maori	Labour

Wētere joined the Labour Party in 1957, and was first elected to Parliament in the 1969 election as MP for the Western Maori electorate, one of the four Māori electorates in New Zealand's House of Representatives. Given Labour's traditional dominance in the Māori electorates, Wētere held his position without difficulty until his retirement at the 1996 election. In 1976 he was promoted by Labour leader Bill Rowling and made Shadow Minister of Forests. Three years later he was given the Maori Affairs and Lands portfolios instead.

=== Cabinet minister ===
Wētere became Minister of Māori Affairs when the Labour Party won the 1984 election, serving in that role until 1990. He also served as Minister of Lands, Minister of Forestry, and the Minister in charge of the Valuation Department between 1984 and 1987, and the Minister in charge of the Iwi Transition Agency between 1989 and 1990.

Wētere was criticised during the Māori loan affair of 1985–86, and was nearly asked to resign. Tamati Reedy, the head of Wētere's department, Te Puni Kokiri, was solicited to arrange an unauthorised overseas loan for Māori businesses by a conman with ties to the Central Intelligence Agency. Wētere was the subject of strong attacks over the issue by National Party MP Winston Peters- who refused to acknowledge the CIA connections of his sources- but denied any wrongdoing. In 1990 Wētere refused to translate his addresses to parliament into English, having given them in Māori. This was one of a number of steps which pushed the issue of the use of Māori in public life during this time. There are now arrangements for simultaneous interpretation between English and Māori in Parliament.

When Labour lost power in the 1990 election, Wētere returned to opposition for two terms before retiring from politics. He was Shadow Minister of Maori Affairs from 1990 to 1996 under Mike Moore and later Helen Clark. Never a supporter of Clark, Wētere was one of several frontbenchers who was part of a delegation met with Clark in her office prior to a caucus meeting in 1996 persuading her to stand down and informing her (in a ruse) that they had the numbers to oust her as leader (in favour of Phil Goff) if she refused. Clark defied Goff and his supporters, and ultimately remained leader.

=== Death ===
Wētere died in Te Kūiti on 23 June 2018, one day after his 83rd birthday.

== Honours ==
Wētere was awarded the Queen Elizabeth II Silver Jubilee Medal in 1977, and the New Zealand 1990 Commemoration Medal. In the 1996 New Year Honours, he was appointed a Commander of the Order of the British Empire, for services to the Māori people.

The University of Waikato awarded Wētere an honorary doctorate for his contributions to the well-being and the advancement of Māori affairs in New Zealand in 1999, and a lifetime achievement award, Te Tohu Whakamaharatanga ki Te Arikinui Te Atairangikaahu, in 2008.

== Notes ==
Political offices
Preceded by Ben Couch	Minister of Māori Affairs; 1984–1990	Succeeded by Winston Peters
Preceded by Jonathan Elworthy	Minister of Forestry; 1984–1987	Succeeded by Peter Tapsell
Preceded by Jonathan Elworthy	Minister of Lands; 1984–1987	Succeeded by Peter Tapsell
New ministerial post	Minister for Land Information; 1987	Succeeded by Peter Tapsell
New Zealand Parliament
Preceded by Iriaka Rātana	Member of Parliament for Western Maori; 1969–1996	Constituency abolished, replaced by Te Tai Hauauru
