= Wyatt Creech =

New Zealand politician (born 1946)

The Right Honourable Wyatt Creech CNZM
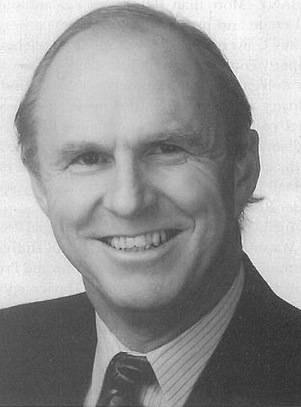

14th Deputy Prime Minister of New Zealand
- In office 14 August 1998 – 10 December 1999
- Prime Minister: Jenny Shipley
- Preceded by: Winston Peters
- Succeeded by: Jim Anderton

11th Deputy Leader of the National Party
- In office 8 December 1997 – 7 February 2001
- Leader: Jenny Shipley
- Preceded by: Don McKinnon
- Succeeded by: Bill English

39th Minister of Education
- In office 1 March 1996 – 31 January 1999
- Prime Minister: Jim Bolger; Jenny Shipley
- Preceded by: Lockwood Smith
- Succeeded by: Nick Smith

21st Minister of Revenue
- In office 2 November 1990 – 29 February 1996
- Prime Minister: Jim Bolger
- Preceded by: Peter Neilson
- Succeeded by: Peter Dunne

52nd Minister of Customs
- In office 2 November 1990 – 1 July 1993
- Prime Minister: Jim Bolger
- Preceded by: Peter Neilson
- Succeeded by: Murray McCully

Member of the New Zealand House of Representatives
- In office 27 November 1999 – 27 July 2002
- Constituency: National Party List
- In office 12 July 1988 – 27 November 1999
- Preceded by: Reg Boorman
- Succeeded by: Georgina Beyer
- Constituency: Wairarapa

Personal details
- Born: 13 October 1946 (age 80) Oceanside, California, U.S.
- Party: National
- Spouse: Diana (Danny) Marie
- Education: Massey University

Wyatt Beetham Creech CNZM PC (born 13 October 1946) is a retired New Zealand politician. He served as the 14th deputy prime minister of New Zealand in Jenny Shipley's National Party government from August 1998 to December 1999.

== Early life ==
Creech was born in Oceanside, California, United States. His father, Jesse Wyatt Creech, hailed from North Carolina. Jesse had enlisted in the United States Marine Corps in 1939. He served in the 3rd Defense Battalion, which saw action at Pearl Harbor on 7 December 1941, the Battle of Midway Island in June 1942, and through the whole Guadalcanal campaign from 7 August 1942 until early 1943.

Creech's mother, a New Zealander, met his father when the 3rd Defense Battalion was deployed to Masterton, New Zealand, for rest and recovery following the successful conclusion of the Guadalcanal campaign. When Creech was three months old, the family returned to New Zealand, settling in Wairarapa where his father became a sheep and beef farmer. Creech received his primary education in Masterton and his secondary education in Wanganui at Wanganui Collegiate. Initially Creech farmed at his family farm before obtaining an agricultural qualification at Massey University.

Following completion of that course, Creech travelled extensively overseas including an overland drive from India to the United Kingdom (passing through as well as India, Nepal, Pakistan, Afghanistan, Iran, Turkey, Greece, Yugoslavia, Italy, Switzerland and France).

Further travel took him extensively through Eastern Europe (including Russia). On his return to New Zealand he obtained a degree double majoring in political science and international politics from Victoria University of Wellington. After completing his degree, Creech again travelled overseas this time with his travels focussed on North America. He subsequently returned to Wairarapa and established a vineyard in the newly developing wine growing region of Martinborough.

== Entry into politics ==
New Zealand Parliament
Years	Term	Electorate	List	Party
1988–1990	42nd	Wairarapa		National
1990–1993	43rd	Wairarapa		National
1993–1996	44th	Wairarapa		National
1996–1999	45th	Wairarapa	12	National
1999–2002	46th	List	2	National

In the 1987 election, Creech contested the Wairarapa seat for the National Party. On election night, Creech won on the provisional vote count by 65 votes, and attended the first National caucus. The official count (completed two weeks later) reversed the election night provisional count and the constituency was won by the incumbent Labour Party MP, Reg Boorman by seven votes. Creech challenged that result with a petition under the provisions of the Electoral Act; supported initially by MPs Roger McClay and Winston Peters (who had been involved in recounts in Taupo and Hunua) but not the party hierarchy, according to Creech's account in a book by Ross Meurant. A Judicial Recount, the initial step, saw Boorman's lead reduced to one vote.

Creech then launched a full Electoral Petition on two counts. First, that a number who had voted in the election were not qualified to vote in the Wairarapa constituency on various grounds (including failure to qualify under the residency rules), and second, that Boorman had violated laws that set a limit on election spending by candidates. Boorman in his counter challenge also challenged a number of votes on various grounds. In all, more than 200 votes were reviewed by the Electoral Court. The process took eleven months to complete. On 12 July 1988, the Electoral Court found in Creech's favour on both counts in its judgement on the Wairarapa Election Petition, and he took his seat immediately with a majority of 34 votes (9994 to 9960). Over his period as MP for Wairarapa his majority significantly increased from this narrow initial victory, increasing to over 7 thousand votes by the 1996 election.

=== Cabinet minister ===
When the National Party won the 1990 election, Creech was appointed to the Cabinet of the fourth National government as its most junior member. Initially, his two main roles were Minister of Revenue (until 1996) and Minister of Customs (until 1993). Over the three terms of National-led governments he held a number of other Cabinet portfolios, including Associate (later Deputy) Minister of Finance (1991–1996), Minister for State Owned Enterprises (1993), Minister of Employment (1994–1996), Minister of Education (1996–1999), Minister for Courts (1997–1998), and Minister of Health (1999).

Creech chaired the cross party committees of MPs that developed the Superannuation Accord and the Employment Accord. Creech supported Jenny Shipley's December 1997 party-room coup against Prime Minister Jim Bolger, and Creech became Deputy Leader of the National Party on 8 December 1997.

=== Deputy Prime Minister ===
In August 1998, the coalition between the National Party and New Zealand First broke down, and New Zealand First's Winston Peters was sacked as Deputy Prime Minister. Shipley appointed Creech to fill the vacancy. However, barely a year later, the Shipley government was heavily defeated by Labour. Prior to this election, Creech had stood aside from contesting the Wairarapa Electorate as the National Party candidate and became a List MP. Under National Party rules, his position as Deputy Leader automatically put him in the second position on National's party list, assuring his reelection despite National's heavy losses. He was appointed a member of the Privy Council just before the election.

Creech became Deputy Leader of the Opposition and Shadow Minister of Health under Shipley. Creech remained as the party's deputy leader until February 2001, when he chose to stand down. He was replaced by Bill English. Creech did not stand for re-election in the 2002 election.

== Post-politics career ==
Following his retirement from politics, Creech headed up a small group that took advantage of the opportunities created by the deregulation of the dairy industry by the founding of the Open Country Cheese Company, located near Matamata, in Waikato. This has now grown into Open Country Dairy Co Ltd with both milk powder and cheese production facilities in Waharoa (near Matamata), Waikato, Awarua (near Invercargill) and Wanganui. The original cheese company was formed on 28 November 2001 (the date on which the Dairy Industry Restructuring Act 2001 received the Royal Assent. Manufacturing commenced in October 2004.

He stood down from the board of this company in 2008. In 2007 Creech and his associates launched as an offshoot from the commodity product manufacturing operation Open Country a new specialty cheese production focussed operation Kaimai Cheese (named after the local mountain range) and served from commencement as its Chairman.

He stood down from the board of this company in 2013 when their assets were sold to a new producer. In 2009 he joined the board of NZ Windfarms. retiring from that board in December 2013. Creech also served for a two-year period on the boards of Seales Limited, a Waikato-based stock feed manufacturing firm, the Cognition Education Trust, a trust supporting education research in New Zealand. he then joined the board of Healthcare Holdings Limited (providing various community-based health services).

In September 2009, Creech joined the New Zealand Fire Service Commission as Deputy Chair. As of mid 2014 he serves as Chair of the New Zealand Fire Service Commission and Heritage New Zealand Pouhere Taonga (replacement Crown entity for the New Zealand Historic Places Trust) and Deputy Chair of Healthcare Holdings Limited.

In 2009–2010, Creech was commissioned by the Minister for the Environment and the Minister of Local Government to head a review of the performance of Environment Canterbury. Their report was highly critical of the performance and capability of the organisation, and while the recommendations were controversial, were fully implemented by the government.

Creech served as part of the Solomon Islands International Election Observer Team in the 2001 General Election in that nation. He also led the New Zealand Election Observer Team in the August 2010 General Election in Solomon Islands. He also served on the International Election Observer Team for the Falkland Islands referendum on its future status in 2013.

Creech served from December 2004 until June 2006 as a director of investment and property company Bluechip. He resigned in June 2006. The company failed in November 2008. As former directors, Creech and John Luxton (who resigned in October 2006) were included (2012) in two lawsuits which alleged breach of their duty to investors. No in-court proceedings in relation to this claim eventuated, and in 2014 all legal claims against the former directors were abandoned.

In 2014, he was appointed chair of Heritage New Zealand Pouhere Taonga Board by the Minister for Arts, Culture and Heritage, Chris Finlayson.

== Honours and awards ==
In 1990, Creech was awarded the New Zealand 1990 Commemoration Medal. In the 2003 New Year Honours, he was appointed a Companion of the New Zealand Order of Merit, for services as a Member of Parliament.

== Notes ==
New Zealand Parliament
Preceded by Reg Boorman	Member of Parliament for Wairarapa; 1988–1999	Succeeded by Georgina Beyer
Political offices
Preceded by Peter Neilson	Minister of Customs; 1990–1993	Succeeded by Murray McCully
Preceded by Peter Neilson	Minister of Revenue; 1990–1996	Succeeded by Peter Dunne
Preceded by Lockwood Smith	Minister of Education; 1996–1999	Succeeded by Nick Smith
Preceded by Winston Peters	Deputy Prime Minister of New Zealand; 1998–1999	Succeeded by Jim Anderton
Preceded by Bill English	Minister of Health; 1999	Succeeded by Annette King
Party political offices
Preceded by Don McKinnon	Deputy Leader of the National Party; 1997–2001	Succeeded by Bill English
