= Katherine O'Regan =

New Zealand politician

The Honourable Katherine O'Regan QSO JP

Member of the New Zealand Parliament for Waipa
- In office 1984–1996
- Preceded by: Marilyn Waring
- Succeeded by: Electorate abolished

Member of the New Zealand Parliament for National Party List
- In office 1996–1999

Personal details
- Born: Katherine Victoria Newton; 24 May 1946 Hamilton, New Zealand
- Died: 2 May 2018 (aged 71)
- Party: National
- Spouses: Neil O'Regan (m. 1968, divorced) Michael Cox (m. 1992)
- Children: 2
- Relatives: Susan O'Regan (daughter)

Katherine Victoria O'Regan QSO JP (née Newton; 24 May 1946 – 2 May 2018) was a New Zealand politician. She was a member of Parliament from 1984 to 1999, representing the National Party. She served as a minister for the National Government for six of those years.

== Early life and family ==
O'Regan was born Katherine Victoria Newton in Hamilton on 24 May 1946 to Nettie and Jack Newton. She grew up on the family farm at Te Mata and was educated at Hamilton Girls' High School. After leaving school, she chose a nursing career but left after two years due to suffering from back problems.

In 1968, she married Neil O'Regan, and the couple went on to have two children. After marrying, Katherine O'Regan became involved in community organisations including the Plunket Society, the Hamilton branch of SPELD (a non-profit organisation that supports people with dyslexia), and the Hamilton Speech Therapy Association. After her divorce, O'Regan married former National MP Michael Cox in 1992.

== Early political career ==
O'Regan was a voting delegate for the National Party in the Raglan electorate candidate selection ahead of the 1975 election, where she supported Marilyn Waring. O'Regan would work for Waring as her electoral agent for eight years. She was elected to the Waipa County Council in 1977 and served as a county councillor for eight years; she was the first woman to be elected to the council.

== Parliamentary career ==
New Zealand Parliament
Years	Term	Electorate	List	Party
1984–1987	41st	Waipa		National
1987–1990	42nd	Waipa		National
1990–1993	43rd	Waipa		National
1993–1996	44th	Waipa		National
1996–1999	45th	List	10	National

When Marilyn Waring, then representing the Waipa electorate, retired from Parliament, O'Regan was selected as the new National Party candidate for the electorate in 1984. She held Waipa for twelve years until it was abolished in 1996.

=== In Opposition, 1984–1990 ===
The National Government was defeated at the 1984 election. On her entry to Parliament, O'Regan sought to highlight the plight of children with specific learning disabilities by introducing a private members bill seeking recognition by the education system of children with these disabilities. It was not successful, but the bill was carried over by the Labour Party in Government. It was finally discharged after 1990.

=== In Government, 1990–1999 ===
National regained the government benches in 1990. In the Fourth National Government, O'Regan was appointed as a Minister outside of Cabinet, as Minister of Consumer Affairs, Associate Minister of Health, Associate Minister of Social Welfare and Associate Minister of Women's Affairs. These remained her portfolios until the 1996 election; she additionally served as Minister of Youth Affairs in 1996. As Associate Minister of Health, she amended the Human Rights Act to outlaw discrimination on the grounds of sexual orientation and having organisms in the body which might cause disease and established a free breast cancer screening programme.

In 1994, O'Regan led the New Zealand delegation to the United Nations International Conference on Population and Development in Cairo and also gave the Second Country Report to CEDAW at the United Nations in New York.

Ahead of the 1996 general election, the Waipa electorate was disestablished. O'Regan contested the Tauranga electorate against the former National Party MP for Tauranga, Winston Peters, who was contesting the electorate under his New Zealand First Party. O'Regan was unsuccessful in this election but remained in Parliament as a list MP. With the National Party forming a coalition government with New Zealand First, O'Regan did not continue as a minister and was instead appointed the Chairperson of the Internal Affairs select committee from 1996 to 1999. O'Regan continued her interest in population and development issues by establishing, with the help of Family Planning International, a New Zealand Parliamentarians' Group on Population and Development.

In the 1999 general election, she again challenged Peters, and came within 62 votes of defeating him—had she won, the New Zealand First party would have lost all parliamentary representation. Labour's candidate Margaret Wilson, who came third in the electorate, requested a recount. The final result was a 63 votes majority for Peters. O'Regan attempted to oust Peters from the electorate by encouraging voters to vote tactically, and vote for her rather than Labour's Wilson. However, Peters was re-elected but with a much reduced margin. Unlike in 1996, O'Regan was not high enough on National's party list to remain in Parliament and thus retired from politics.

== Later life and death ==
After leaving Parliament, O'Regan remained engaged in community activities. She was the chair of the Te Awamutu Community Public Relations Organisation. She served as chair of the human ethics in research committee at Waikato Institute of Technology for eight years, and was a member of the complaints committee of the Waikato/Bay of Plenty branch of the New Zealand Law Society.

O'Regan was also interested in genealogy, researching and writing books on several branches of her family.

In 2008, O'Regan was diagnosed with breast cancer, through the free screening programme she had established as Associate Minister of Health. She died of her illness on 2 May 2018, at the age of 71.

== Honours and awards ==
In 1990, O'Regan received the New Zealand 1990 Commemoration Medal, and three years later she was awarded the New Zealand Suffrage Centennial Medal 1993. In the 2002 Queen's Birthday and Golden Jubilee Honours, O'Regan was appointed a Companion of the Queen's Service Order for public services.

== Political views ==
O'Regan was a council member of Family Planning New Zealand. She favoured compulsory sex education from age ten and condom vending machines in all secondary schools and public toilets. In an obituary, her daughter Susan O'Regan described her mother as a Royalist, feminist, and strong believer in equal rights.

Political offices
New office	Associate Minister of Women's Affairs; 1990–1996	In abeyance Title next held by Deborah Morris
New Zealand Parliament
Preceded by Marilyn Waring	Member of Parliament for Waipa; 1984–1996	Vacant Constituency abolished
