= Hamish MacIntyre =

New Zealand politician (born 1951)

Member of the New Zealand Parliament for Manawatu
- In office 1990–1993
- Preceded by: David Robinson
- Succeeded by: Jill White

Personal details
- Born: 1951 (age 74–75) Waipukurau, New Zealand
- Party: Alliance (after 1991); National (before 1991)
- Relations: Duncan MacIntyre (father)

Hamish MacIntyre (born 1951) is a former New Zealand politician who at various times represented the National Party, Liberal Party, and the Alliance.

== Early life ==
MacIntyre was born in Waipukurau in 1951. His father was Duncan MacIntyre, who was the Deputy Prime Minister to Robert Muldoon from 1981 to 1984 in the Third National Government.

== Political career ==
New Zealand Parliament
Years	Term	Electorate	Party
1990–1991	43rd	Manawatu	National
1991–1992	Changed allegiance to:		Liberal
1992–1993	Changed allegiance to:		Alliance

He was elected to Parliament for the Manawatu seat for the National Party in 1990, winning the seat from Labour. But he was dissatisfied with the monetarist policy of Ruth Richardson, known as Ruthanasia, which the fourth National Government was following.

In 1991 MacIntyre and fellow dissident National MP Gilbert Myles and member Frank Grover formed the New Zealand Liberal Party, which soon joined the Alliance, as the new Liberal Party with two first-term MPs was having organisational difficulties. MacIntyre stayed with the Liberal Party within the (left-wing) Alliance, though Myles then joined New Zealand First.

MacIntyre lost his seat at the 1993 election then later stood as a list candidate for the Alliance in 1996, but was unsuccessful and retired from politics to become a company director.

New Zealand Parliament
Preceded by David Robinson	Member of Parliament for Manawatu; 1990–1993	Succeeded by Jill White
