= Michael Cox (New Zealand politician) =

New Zealand politician

Michael Ernest Christopher Cox OBE (born 10 May 1939) is a former New Zealand politician of the National Party.

== Biography ==
New Zealand Parliament
Years	Term	Electorate	Party
1978–1981	39th	Manawatu	National
1981–1984	40th	Manawatu	National
1984–1987	41st	Manawatu	National

Cox was born in 1939 at Oxford, England. He was in the British Merchant Navy, and was a chief officer with the Union Steam Ship Company before becoming a chartered accountant in Palmerston North.

He represented the Manawatu electorate in Parliament from 1978 to 1987, when he was defeated by David Robinson. From 1981 to 1985 he was Junior Whip for the party. He was an opponent of National's then leader Robert Muldoon and was an organiser in the Colonels' Coup, an abortive attempt to remove him from the leadership of the party.

In 1984 Cox was appointed Shadow Minister of Revenue by Muldoon. In 1985 he was additionally given the Customs portfolio by new leader Jim McLay. Cox was a key supporter of McLay and became his "numbers man" in the caucus. In a major reshuffle in February 1986 McLay promoted Cox to the position of Shadow Minister of Finance. His elevation to the high-profile finance portfolio role did not last long and after McLay was deposed by Jim Bolger he was relegated to the Customs portfolio once again and was additionally made Shadow Minister for the Audit Department. In National's post-election reshuffle following the party's defeat at the 1987 election, Cox was intended to regain the finance portfolio, however his election night majority of 33 was eroded into a 126 vote defeat following the counting of special votes seeing Cox lose his seat in parliament.

In 1989 he sought the National Party nomination to stand in the Auckland seat of North Shore at the 1990 election, to replace the retiring George Gair. He was narrowly beaten in a members ballot by Bruce Cliffe.

In 1990, Cox was awarded the New Zealand 1990 Commemoration Medal. In the 1995 Queen's Birthday Honours, he was appointed an Officer of the Order of the British Empire, for public services.

== Political positions ==
Cox has argued that climate change is not caused by humans and has suggested that global warming is "Complete rubbish".

== Personal life ==
He married his former National MP colleague Katherine O'Regan in 1992.

== Notes ==
New Zealand Parliament
Preceded by Allan McCready	Member of Parliament for Manawatu; 1978–1987	Succeeded by David Robinson
