= Gilbert Myles =

New Zealand politician (born 1945)

Gilbert Colin Myles (born 18 October 1945) is a former New Zealand politician who entered Parliament for the National Party in 1990, then split from the party in 1991 and sat as an independent, before representing the Liberal Party, the Alliance and the New Zealand First party.

== Early life and family ==
Born in Scotland on 18 October 1945 to David Myles and Janet Duncan, Myles came to New Zealand with his family as an infant. He was educated at Papanui High School. In 1971 Myles married Colleen Kirker, and the couple had two children.

== Member of Parliament ==
New Zealand Parliament
Years	Term	Electorate	List	Party
1990–1991	43rd	Roskill		National
1991	Changed allegiance to:			Independent
1991–1992	Changed allegiance to:			Liberal
1992–1993	Changed allegiance to:			Alliance
1993	Changed allegiance to:			NZ First
1999	45th	List	10	NZ First

He was elected to Parliament for the seat of Roskill in the 1990 election as part of the New Zealand National Party, a previously safe-seat of the previously ruling Labour Party, largely on a platform of opposition to the "Rogernomics" economic reforms that had occurred during the 1980s in New Zealand. He openly identified with the pro-interventionist 'Muldoonist' faction of the National Party, once saying "I joined the National Party because of Sir Robert Muldoon". His campaign slogan was "Let's rescue Roskill".

Myles, however, quickly fell out with the leadership of the National Party (that had simultaneously become the Government) due to the party's own swing toward privatisation and the slashing of the Government's expenditure on social policy enthusiastically implemented by Finance Minister Ruth Richardson (see Ruthanasia). His disgust with the continuation of these reforms by Prime Minister Jim Bolger led to his identification with the rebels within the National Party, like Michael Laws and Winston Peters, who together had major confrontations with the dominant neo-liberals within the party's relatively gargantuan caucus.

=== Liberal Party ===
Eventually, the total breakdown of relations between Myles and the majority of the Government led to him and another dissident, Hamish MacIntyre, breaking away to become independents in late 1991 and then proceeding to form the Liberal Party in 1991. The party failed to gain significant popular support, with the problem being that neither of the two MPs of the party had any significant political experience but also the emergence of the left wing Alliance party and Winston Peters continuing to criticise National from within. In June 1992 the Liberal Party joined the Alliance and Myles became an Alliance MP. At the Alliance's inaugural party conference in November 1992 Myles put himself forward for a position of one of the Alliance's deputy leaders but was beaten by Sandra Lee and Jeanette Fitzsimons in a delegate ballot.

Myles instigated a political scandal when in September 1992 he accused former Labour MP Fred Gerbic of operating a graft while he was a minister. Myles, under Parliamentary privilege, alleged that Gerbic took financial donations in exchange for residency approvals in his capacity as associate Minister of Immigration and in support tabled a transcript of an alleged tape recorded conversation between two Auckland Labour Party members. In response Gerbic denied the allegations and maintained his innocence throughout. The claims were investigated by John McGrath QC who found no evidence of impropriety by Gerbic and dismissed Myles' claims.

=== New Zealand First ===
During 1993, the Liberal Party merged with the much larger and far more left wing Alliance Party. Myles proceeded to quit the grouping within months in July, particularly over his somewhat conservative social values conflicting with the highly socially liberal policies of the Alliance. He immediately joined the populist New Zealand First party, founded by the now Independent Winston Peters. However he lost his seat during the 1993 election.

At the 1998 local elections Myles stood for a seat on the Auckland City Council in the Avondale-Roskill ward as an independent candidate. He was not elected.

Myles re-entered parliament for a brief period during 1999, following the total breakdown of the New Zealand First – National coalition government and the resignation of former NZ First MP turned Independent minister in the National government Deborah Morris over the prioritisation of military expenditure over social expenditure in the 1999 budget. Some controversy emerged as Morris issued a tape-recorded telephone conversation between her and Myles where he admitted that he would immediately quit NZ First upon arrival in Parliament and would support the struggling Jenny Shipley-led National Government (This did not end up occurring, following threats of discipline by Peters and other NZ First party members).

== Life after politics ==
Myles was not re-elected in the election later that year and retired from active politics.

In 2011 he was found guilty on a charge of obstructing the course of justice for faking a receipt book while under investigation for fraud. He was found not guilty on the fraud charges. For the obstruction of justice charge, he was sentenced to community detention and community work. Myles has since resigned as a Justice of the Peace.

New Zealand Parliament
Preceded by Phil Goff	Member of Parliament for Roskill; 1990–1993	Succeeded by Phil Goff
