= Jack Elder (politician) =

New Zealand politician

The Honourable Jack Elder

27th Minister of Internal Affairs
- In office 16 December 1996 – 10 December 1999
- Prime Minister: Jim Bolger; Jenny Shipley
- Preceded by: Peter Dunne
- Succeeded by: Mark Burton

31st Minister of Police
- In office 16 December 1996 – 31 August 1998
- Prime Minister: Jim Bolger; Jenny Shipley
- Preceded by: John Luxton
- Succeeded by: Clem Simich

9th Minister of Local Government
- In office 9 August 1999 – 10 December 1999
- Prime Minister: Jenny Shipley
- Preceded by: Tony Ryall
- Succeeded by: Sandra Lee

Member of the New Zealand Parliament
- In office 14 July 1984 – 27 November 1999
- Constituency: West Auckland (1984–93); Henderson (1993–96); List (1996–99)

Personal details
- Born: 3 July 1949 (age 77)
- Party: Labour (1966–1996); New Zealand First (1996–1998); Mauri Pacific (1998–1999)
- Other political affiliations: New Zealand Democratic Coalition
- Spouse: Claire Girling-Butcher (died 13 November 1999)
- Children: Dr Edward Elder
- Profession: Teacher

Jack Arnold Elder (born 3 July 1949) is a New Zealand former politician. He was an MP from 1984 to 1999, representing the Labour Party, New Zealand First and Mauri Pacific.

== Early life ==
Jack Elder was born and raised in West Auckland, attending New Lynn Primary, Avondale Intermediate and Kelston Boys High School. At the latter, he was head boy and captain of the rugby first fifteen. Elder studied politics and history at the University of Auckland, graduating with a B.A in both History and Political Studies as well as a M.A in Political Studies. Upon graduation, he became a teacher at schools such as Henderson High School from 1974 to 1977 and Rutherford College from 1979 to 1981.

== Early political career ==
Alongside future prime minister Helen Clark and future Minister of Foreign Affairs Phil Goff, Elder was a member of Princes Street Labour. He became active in local politics, being a member of the New Lynn Borough Council from 1976 to 1983, including as deputy mayor from 1980.

Elder twice unsuccessfully sought the Labour Party nomination in safe electorates for the party. In 1975, he unsuccessfully sought the Labour Party candidacy for the Onehunga electorate alongside 26 other aspirants following the retirement of Hugh Watt, but lost to Frank Rogers. In 1980, he put his name forward to replace long serving MP Warren Freer in the safe Labour seat of Mount Albert, but missed out on the nomination to Helen Clark. He did receive the nomination to stand in Helensville in the 1978 election and the 1981 election, but lost on both occasions.

== Member of Parliament ==
New Zealand Parliament
Years	Term	Electorate	List	Party
1984–1987	41st	West Auckland		Labour
1987–1990	42nd	West Auckland		Labour
1990–1993	43rd	West Auckland		Labour
1993–1996	44th	Henderson		Labour
1996	Changed allegiance to:			NZ First
1996–1998	45th	List	7	NZ First
1998–1999	Changed allegiance to:			Mauri Pacific

=== Labour Party ===
Elder was first elected to Parliament in the 1984 election as the Labour MP for West Auckland. He was re-elected in the 1987 election, the 1990 election, and in the 1993 election. Although Labour formed a government for the first of Elder's two terms as an MP, he was not promoted to Cabinet.

In 1990, Elder was awarded the New Zealand 1990 Commemoration Medal. After the 1990 election, which Labour lost, he was appointed Shadow Minister of Agriculture by Mike Moore. In January 1993 he also picked up the Overseas Trade portfolio in a minor reshuffle.

=== Defection from Labour Party to New Zealand First ===
Within the Labour Party, Elder was a staunch supporter of Moore, and belonged to the more economically liberal wing of the party. When Helen Clark replaced Moore as party leader he was dropped from the Agriculture portfolio, but continued as Shadow Minister of Overseas Trade. Elder remained aligned with Moore and consequently he was ranked 40th on Labour's initial party list for the 1996 general election, the lowest of any sitting Labour MP. In response he questioned his ties with Labour and position in parliament, not ruling out resigning and forcing a by-election.

I don't have to stay in politics ... things have changed dramatically since I was elected a Labour candidate in 1984 and from when Mike Moore was leader. Instead of staying close to the issues which affect families, we [Labour] are getting further and further away from that because the people who now have control of the party don't see that primarily as the party's role. They have another vision altogether. They believe in the patchwork quilt. They think they can get a majority by patching together feminists, gays and other minorities.

Clark countered Elder's critiques saying Elder's list ranking reflected his lack of achievements as an MP. Elder bridled at Clark's comments, pointing to his 29 year membership and his time as Shadow Minister of Agriculture where he laboriously explained party policy to "incredulous farmers". He was clear that he didn't blame Clark and thought party processes and policies were responsible for his dissatisfaction.

When suggestions arose that Moore would found a new party, Elder was considered likely to follow. In the end, Moore remained with Labour, but Elder was still dissatisfied. On 3 April 1996, Elder left the Labour Party to join New Zealand First, a centrist conservative party led by Winston Peters. He became New Zealand First's spokesman for local government.

=== Coalition and Minority Government ===
In the 1996 election, Elder was re-elected to Parliament as a list MP for New Zealand First, having unsuccessfully contested the Waipareira electorate. When New Zealand First formed a coalition with the governing National Party, Elder was appointed to Cabinet, becoming Minister of Internal Affairs, Minister of Police, and Minister of Civil Defence. As Minister of Police, Elder officially opened the Queenstown Police Station on Friday 10 July 1998. When New Zealand First's coalition with National began to collapse, however, Elder joined the group of MPs who quit New Zealand First and continued to offer support to the National Party government, which became a minority government. He officially left New Zealand First on 18 August 1998. In exchange for his continued support for the government, Elder was allowed to remain Minister of Internal Affairs and Minister of Civil Defence, although he was no longer part of Cabinet.

Later, Elder joined with four other former New Zealand First MPs to found the Mauri Pacific Party. Elder eventually chose not to seek re-election, and retired from politics at the 1999 election.

== Later life ==
Elder spent time off from working, before returning to teaching two years after leaving Parliament.

== Notes ==
Political offices
Preceded by Peter Dunne	Minister of Internal Affairs; 1996–1999	Succeeded by Mark Burton
Preceded by John Luxton	Minister of Police; 1996–1998	Succeeded by Clem Simich
Preceded by Tony Ryall	Minister of Local Government; 1999	Succeeded by Sandra Lee
New Zealand Parliament
New constituency	Member of Parliament for West Auckland; 1984–1993	Constituencies abolished
Vacant Constituency recreated after abolition in 1975 Title last held by Martyn Finlay	Member of Parliament for Henderson; 1993–1996	Constituencies abolished
