= David Robinson (New Zealand politician) =

New Zealand politician

Dave Robinson

Member of the New Zealand Parliament for Manawatu
- In office 15 August 1987 – 27 October 1990
- Preceded by: Michael Cox
- Succeeded by: Hamish MacIntyre

Personal details
- Born: 1951 (age 74–75) Christchurch, New Zealand
- Party: Labour
- Other political affiliations: Labor; Greens; Australian Greens
- Spouse: Sue
- Children: 2
- Education: Massey University
- Profession: Social welfare worker

David John Robinson (born 1951) is a former New Zealand politician of the Labour Party.

== Biography ==
=== Early life and career ===
Robinson was born in 1951 in Christchurch. He attended Christchurch Boys' High School and later Massey University where he began a bachelor of social work degree.

He worked for two years as a psychiatric nurse, and briefly as a refrigeration mechanic, before becoming a probation officer. He was convener of the group Manawatu Men Against Violence and belonged to both New Zealand Association of Social Workers and New Zealand Association of Probation Officers. He was also an associate lecturer at Massey University in both social work and social policy.

=== Political career ===
New Zealand Parliament
Years	Term	Electorate	Party
1987–1990	42nd	Manawatu	Labour

From 1970 to 1977 he lived in Australia and was an active member of the Australian Labor Party (ALP). He admired the ALP government of Gough Whitlam and its expansion of welfare and health services. When he returned to New Zealand he joined the New Zealand Labour Party. At the 1984 election he was the campaign manager for Dave Alton, Labour's candidate for the Manawatu electorate, who narrowly lost to incumbent MP Michael Cox.

At the next election in 1987, Robinson and Alton switched roles. Robinson managed to defeat Cox (after a recount) and was elected to represent the Manawatu electorate in Parliament. Robinson was one of a group of new Labour MPs elected in 1987, along with some already in Parliament, who wanted to work towards returning the government to what they saw as traditional Labour values, as opposed to the policies being implemented by Roger Douglas and others.

He was designated chairman of the Labour caucus committee on foreign affairs. He was surprised as he had no background expertise in this area and soon began to view the extensive caucus committee system as little more than a method to scatter the attention and energy of otherwise rebellious backbenchers. He was also on the electoral, energy, justice and social welfare caucus committees.

At the 1990, he was defeated by Hamish MacIntyre, one of a number of losses contributing to the fall of the Fourth Labour Government. Robinson was unsurprised by their lack of success, but regarded the adoption of MMP as the most valuable response to the "Unbridled Power" of the Cabinet in a one-party government.

=== Later activities ===
He has since been active at a grass-roots level in the Green Parties of both New Zealand and Australia. Professionally, he has worked as a Social Worker and Mediator.

== Personal life ==
He and his wife Sue, a psychologist, have one child each from previous relationships, both of whom form part of their extended family along with 3 grandchildren.

== Notes ==
New Zealand Parliament
Preceded by Michael Cox	Member of Parliament for Manawatu; 1987–1990	Succeeded by Hamish MacIntyre
