= Bill Dillon (politician) =

New Zealand politician

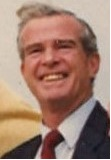
- Dillon in 1987

Member of the New Zealand Parliament for Hamilton East
- In office 14 July 1984 – 27 October 1990
- Preceded by: Ian Shearer
- Succeeded by: Tony Steel

Personal details
- Born: 16 April 1933
- Died: 17 April 1994 (aged 61) Hamilton, New Zealand
- Party: Labour
- Children: 4
- Education: University of Auckland
- Profession: Lawyer

Joseph Gilbert "Bill" Dillon (16 April 1933 – 17 April 1994) was a New Zealand politician of the Labour Party in the Fourth Labour Government of New Zealand.

== Biography ==
=== Early life and career ===
Dillon studied at Auckland University College and graduated LLB in 1957. Dillon then entered the legal profession and joined the Hamilton legal firm of McCaw, Smith and Arcus in 1961, becoming a partner in 1963. He was also a member of the Territorial Force where he held the rank of Flying Officer.

=== Political career ===
New Zealand Parliament
Years	Term	Electorate	List	Party
1984–1987	41st	Hamilton East		Labour
1987–1990	42nd	Hamilton East		Labour

Prior to entering Parliament Dillon was a member of the Auckland Harbour Board from 1971 to 1986 and was deputy-chairman from 1980 to 1981. He was also a member of the Hamilton Civic Trust and Hamilton District Law Society Council.

He represented the Hamilton East electorate in Parliament from 1984 to 1990, when he was defeated by Tony Steel, and the Labour Party was defeated overall by the National Party. While in Parliament Dillon was the Chair of the Justice and Law Reform committees. He was also a member of the Electoral, Foreign Affairs and State Owned Enterprises committees.

In November 1989, a private members' bill in Dillon's name passed its third reading, abolishing the last vestiges of capital punishment in New Zealand. De facto abolition of the death penalty had occurred in 1961 with capital punishment remaining only for treason or treachery. Dillon's Abolition of the Death Penalty Bill received 52 votes in favour and 14 against, with Dillon arguing that "the use of the death penalty in any form is a breach of human rights." The Bill's passage had looked uncertain after Dillon missed the opportunity to move the second reading on 6 September and it was discharged. The Labour government moved reinstatement and recission of discharge motions two weeks later, which National MP Bill Birch said was "unprecedented" for a member's bill. Dillon was absent during these debates and the subsequent second reading, with his colleague Richard Northey speaking on his behalf.

=== Later life and death ===
After losing his seat Dillon accepted an appointment as a judge of the Supreme Court in Samoa.

Dillon died aged 61 in Hamilton on 17 April 1994 following a short illness.

== Notes ==
New Zealand Parliament
Preceded by Ian Shearer	Member of Parliament for Hamilton East; 1984–1990	Succeeded by Tony Steel
