= New Zealand Liberal Party (1991) =

- Founders: Gilbert Myles; Hamish MacIntyre
- Founded: 11 September 1991
- Dissolved: 17 January 1998
- Split from: National Party
- Merged into: Alliance
- Ideology: Liberalism; Social liberalism
- Political position: Centre
- Slogan: "New Zealand first"

The New Zealand Liberal Party founded in 1991 (not to be confused with the original Liberal Party or the 1962 Liberal Party) was a splinter group of the National Party.

== History ==
=== Origins ===
The Liberal Party was founded by Gilbert Myles and Hamish MacIntyre, two dissident National MPs. Myles and McIntyre were opponents of the economic reforms (dubbed "Ruthanasia") promoted by Minister of Finance Ruth Richardson, believing that they were harmful to society. As a result of their objections, Myles and McIntyre fell out with their National Party colleagues, and eventually decided to break away. After a short time as independents, they established the Liberal Party.

At its launch the party predicted it would win "six or seven seats" at the next election and hold the balance of power. Myles and MacIntyre also stated that they were anticipating a third National MP would soon join. They were careful not to mention a name, but media quickly identified Cam Campion as the MP inferred. Campion was interviewed and stated that he had not given up on National just yet and was still "flat out" trying to change National's policy direction.

The party's membership was made up of erstwhile National supporters as well as active members who resigned from National to join the Liberals. Prominent members of the party organisation also left including two members of National's Auckland divisional council in October 1991. Judith Surgenor (chair of National's Waitakere electorate committee) and Larry Belshaw (electorate committee secretary and 1990 candidate for Mount Albert) both resigned to join the Liberal Party citing dissatisfaction with the policies of the National government. In November another former National Party divisional councillor Malcolm Wright was chosen as the president of the party.

=== Alliance membership ===
The new organisation was plagued by organisational difficulties, and neither Myles not MacIntyre — both first-term MPs — had much political experience. Not long after the party was established, Myles and McIntyre opted to join the Liberals with the newly formed Alliance party. Although the Alliance was considerably more left-wing than the Liberals, it was emerging as the most significant political group to oppose Ruth Richardson's policies — the leader of the Alliance, Jim Anderton, had quit his own Labour Party out of opposition to Roger Douglas, an ideological ally of Richardson. Liberal politician Sue Corbett, an Auckland City Councillor, was the Alliance candidate for Mayor of Auckland City, running a high-profile campaign at the 1992 local body elections. Corbett ultimately lost to incumbent mayor Les Mills.

In 1993, however, a more prominent dissident within the National Party, Winston Peters, also quit. Although it was briefly considered that a pact might be formed between the Alliance and Peters, the two proved incompatible, and Peters established the New Zealand First party. At the time when Myles and McIntyre had split from National, they had entertained hopes that Peters (and possibly Michael Laws or Cam Campion) would join them, and were therefore disappointed at the failure of talks between Peters and the Alliance. The possibility of leaving the Alliance and merging with New Zealand First was discussed, but deep divisions emerged within the party about this possibility. In the end, Myles (along with party president Malcolm Wright and central regional chairman Trevor Jans) opted to leave the Liberals and join New Zealand First. MacIntyre remained with the Liberals for some time afterwards but he was defeated in 1993 and did not enter Parliament again and following the 1996 election where he was a list candidate for the Alliance, he then retired from politics becoming a company director.

=== Disbandment ===
In 1996, leadership of the Liberals fell to Frank Grover, who had been elected to Parliament as an Alliance list MP in the 1996 election. Grover, the party president, defeated Corbett for the Liberal leadership. In 1998 the party had declined to just over 100 members and was eventually dissolved, with its sole MP and remaining members simply becoming members of the Alliance as a whole. This was preceded by the Alliance changing its constitution in November 1997 to make it obligatory for constituent member parties have at least 500 members. The Liberal Party had well over this number at the time Myles defected to New Zealand First in 1993, but swathes of members joined him leaving the party membership decimated. MacIntyre supported the decision but was "a little sad" to see the party wind up but said it was "by far the most realistic option".

Grover himself eventually rejected the Alliance, and shortly before the 1999 election, defected to the Christian Heritage Party, giving it its first seat in Parliament. He did not secure re-election, however.

== Party leadership ==
Leaders

- Gilbert Myles (1991–93)
- Hamish MacIntyre (1993–96)
- Frank Grover (1996–99)

Presidents

- Malcolm Wright (1991–94)
- Frank Grover (1994–99)
