= Bill Sutton (New Zealand politician) =

New Zealand politician (1944–2025)

- Sutton in 2017

Hawke's Bay Regional Councillor
- In office 1992–1995

Member of the New Zealand Parliament for Hawkes Bay
- In office 14 July 1984 – 27 October 1990
- Preceded by: Richard Harrison
- Succeeded by: Michael Laws

Personal details
- Born: William David Sutton; 24 August 1944 Reading, Berkshire, England
- Died: 6 December 2025 (aged 81) Napier, New Zealand
- Party: Labour
- Spouses: Karen Louise Sole (m. 1969; div. 1979); Jacque Aldridge (m. 1980)
- Children: 4
- Relatives: Jim Sutton (brother)
- Occupation: Research scientist
- Scientific career
- Education: Massey University
- Fields: Biochemistry; plant physiology
- Workplaces: Department of Scientific and Industrial Research
- Thesis: The structure of the bacterophage alpha DNA molecule (1969)
- Doctoral advisor: George Petersen

William David Sutton (24 August 1944 – 6 December 2025) was New Zealand politician of the Labour Party. He was Member of Parliament for Hawkes Bay from 1984 to 1990, and later served as a Hawke's Bay Regional Councillor for one term, from 1992 to 1995.

== Early life and family ==
Born in Reading, Berkshire, England on 24 August 1944, Sutton moved to New Zealand with his family, including older brother Jim Sutton, in 1948. He was educated at Timaru Boys' High School, and went on to study at the University of Otago from 1963 to 1966, graduating with a Bachelor of Science degree with first-class honours in 1967. He then undertook doctoral studies in biochemistry at Massey University between 1967 and 1969, supervised by George Petersen, and graduated with a PhD in 1970; his thesis was titled The structure of the bacterophage alpha DNA molecule.

In 1969, Sutton married Karen Louise Sole, and the couple had two children before divorcing in 1979. In 1980, he remarried, to Jacque Aldridge, and they had two more children.

== Scientific career ==
After carrying out post-doctoral research at the University of Edinburgh from 1970 to 1971, Sutton returned to New Zealand and worked as a research scientist in plant physiology at the Department of Scientific and Industrial Research in Palmerston North. His research interests there included the DNA structure of plants, and rhizobium–legume symbiosis.

== Political career ==
New Zealand Parliament
Years	Term	Electorate	Party
1984–1987	41st	Hawkes Bay	Labour
1987–1990	42nd	Hawkes Bay	Labour

At the 1981 general election, Sutton unsuccessfully stood for the Labour Party in the safe National Party seat of Pahiatua against incumbent John Falloon.

Representing the Labour Party, Sutton was elected MP for the Hawkes Bay electorate at the 1984 general election, defeating National's Richard Harrison. His wife, Jacque Aldridge, gave birth to their second son the night of the election. At that election, Sutton's brother Jim was also elected to Parliament as a Labour MP.

Bill Sutton remained in Parliament until 1990, when he was defeated by Michael Laws. His highest position was chairman of Parliament's Finance and Expenditure Select Committee from 1988 to 1990. He also chaired the Commerce and Marketing Select Committee from 1987 to 1990.

In 1990, Sutton was awarded the New Zealand 1990 Commemoration Medal.

In 1992, Sutton was elected a councillor on the Hawke's Bay Regional Council, and served until 1995.

== Life after politics ==
After retiring from politics, Sutton worked as a senior policy analyst from 1996 to 2007.

In retirement, he lived in Napier and became a published poet, his work appearing in Takahe, Poetry New Zealand, JAAM, broadsheet and other literary magazines. His first book Jabberwocky appeared from Steele Roberts. His second published poetry collection Billy Button – A Life (HB Poetry Press, 2016) included a brief autobiographical summary. His final collection was Cloudscapes published in 2022.

Sutton also organised a national poetry conference in Havelock North in 2013 and two East-West Poetry Fests in Palmerston North in 2016 and 2018 and encouraged many poets he met. He was secretary-treasurer for Hawke's Bay Live Poets for a number of years and organised poetry readings.

Sutton died in Napier on 6 December 2025, at the age of 81.

New Zealand Parliament
Preceded by Richard Harrison	Member of Parliament for Hawkes Bay; 1984–1990	Succeeded by Michael Laws
