= Jenny Shipley =

Prime Minister of New Zealand from 1997 to 1999

The Right Honourable Dame Jenny Shipley DNZM
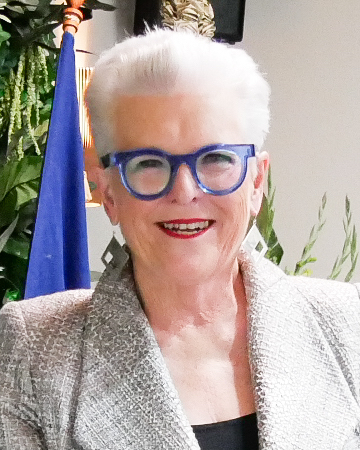
- Shipley in 2020

36th Prime Minister of New Zealand
- In office 8 December 1997 – 10 December 1999
- Monarch: Elizabeth II
- Governor-General: Michael Hardie Boys
- Deputy: Winston Peters; Wyatt Creech
- Preceded by: Jim Bolger
- Succeeded by: Helen Clark

28th Leader of the Opposition
- In office 10 December 1999 – 8 October 2001
- Prime Minister: Helen Clark
- Deputy: Wyatt Creech; Bill English
- Preceded by: Helen Clark
- Succeeded by: Bill English

8th Minister for State Owned Enterprises
- In office 16 December 1996 – 8 December 1997
- Prime Minister: Jim Bolger
- Preceded by: Philip Burdon
- Succeeded by: Tony Ryall

32nd Minister of Health
- In office 29 November 1993 – 16 December 1996
- Prime Minister: Jim Bolger
- Preceded by: Bill Birch
- Succeeded by: Bill English

19th Minister for Social Welfare
- In office 2 November 1990 – 29 November 1993
- Prime Minister: Jim Bolger
- Preceded by: Michael Cullen
- Succeeded by: Peter Gresham

Member of the New Zealand Parliament for Rakaia Ashburton (1987–1990)
- In office 15 August 1987 – 27 July 2002
- Preceded by: Rob Talbot
- Succeeded by: Brian Connell

Personal details
- Born: Jennifer Mary Robson; 4 February 1952 (age 74) Gore, New Zealand
- Party: National
- Spouse: Burton Shipley (m. 1972)
- Children: 2

Dame Jennifer Mary Shipley DNZM PC (née Robson; born 4 February 1952) is a New Zealand former politician who served as the 36th prime minister of New Zealand from 1997 to 1999. She was the first female prime minister of New Zealand, and the first woman to lead the National Party.

Shipley was born in Gore, Southland. She grew up in rural Canterbury, and attended Marlborough Girls' College and the Christchurch College of Education. Before entering politics, she worked as a schoolteacher and was involved with various community organisations. Shipley was elected to Parliament at the 1987 election, winning the Ashburton electorate (later renamed Rakaia). When the National Party returned to power in 1990, she was appointed to Cabinet under Jim Bolger. Shipley subsequently served as Minister of Social Welfare (1990–1996), Minister for Women's Affairs (1990–1996), Minister of Health (1993–1996), and Minister of Transport (1996–1997).

Shipley chafed at the government's slow pace, and in December 1997 convinced her National colleagues to support her as leader. Bolger resigned as prime minister rather than face being voted out, and Shipley was elected as his replacement unopposed. She inherited an uneasy coalition with New Zealand First, led by Winston Peters. The coalition was dissolved in August 1998, but Shipley was able to remain in power with the aid of Mauri Pacific, an NZ First splinter group. At the 1999 election, her government was defeated by the Labour Party, led by Helen Clark. Shipley continued as Leader of the Opposition until October 2001. Shipley involved herself with business and charitable interests since leaving politics, and is a member of the Council of Women World Leaders. She was found liable for $9 million for her role in the financial failure of Mainzeal, a construction company.

== Early life ==
Born in Gore, New Zealand, Shipley was one of four sisters. Her father was Rev. Leonard Cameron Robson, a Presbyterian minister. After attending Marlborough Girls' College, she qualified in 1971 as a teacher through the Christchurch College of Education and taught in New Zealand primary schools until 1976. In 1973 she married Burton Shipley and settled in Ashburton.

== Member of Parliament ==
New Zealand Parliament
Years	Term	Electorate	List	Party
1987–1990	42nd	Ashburton		National
1990–1993	43rd	Ashburton		National
1993–1996	44th	Rakaia		National
1996–1999	45th	Rakaia	4	National
1999–2002	46th	Rakaia	1	National

Having joined the National Party in 1975, Shipley successfully stood in Ashburton, a safe National seat in the country areas surrounding Christchurch, in the 1987 election. Entering parliament at age 35, she was one of parliament's youngest members.

=== Cabinet minister ===
Shipley rose quickly in the National caucus. In February 1990, while still in her first term, party leader Jim Bolger named her the party's spokeswoman on social welfare. When Bolger led the National Party to victory in the 1990 general election, Shipley was reelected in Rakaia, essentially a reconfigured Ashburton. She became Minister of Social Welfare, and also served as Minister for Women's Affairs (1990–1996). In 1993, Shipley was one of 544 women awarded the New Zealand Suffrage Centennial Medal.

==== Minister of Social Welfare ====
Shipley rose rapidly through the ranks of the National Party caucus, and became a close ally of National's Finance Spokeswoman, Ruth Richardson. In November 1990, Shipley was appointed Minister of Social Welfare by Jim Bolger. Her first act as Welfare Minister was to radically redesign the welfare state, introducing harsh benefit cuts in the December 1990 mini-budget, with the cuts coming into force on 1 April 1991. Unemployment Benefit was reduced by $14 per-week, Sickness Benefit by $27, and Domestic Purposes Benefit by $28 per-week. Unemployment Benefit for those aged 18 to 24 was cut by $25 per-week. Universal Family Benefit was abolished completely, clawing back an additional $6 from families.

The cuts to solo parents were particularly harsh, with the qualifying age of Domestic Purposes Benefit increased to 18 years of age. Shipley defended her reforms, arguing that welfare payments were too generous and discouraged people from seeking paid employment. The social effects, however, were severe. Relative child poverty doubled between 1990 and 1994, while incidences of preventable disease among children proliferated. Food banks, which had been rare in New Zealand, became commonplace.

==== Minister of Health ====
After National narrowly won the 1993 election, Bolger removed Richardson from the finance portfolio. In a cabinet reshuffle, Shipley was appointed Minister of Health, inheriting health reforms undertaken by Bill Birch and Simon Upton before him. The creation of Crown Health Enterprises as profit-making entities caused chronic hospital deficits as CHE's were unable to recover costs from patients, with inpatient charges having been abolished in 1993. The funder-provider split between Crown Health Enterprises and Regional Health Authorities further compounded financial instability in the public health system. The promise of greater efficiencies in delivery were often lost in transaction, compliance, and contracting costs. Shipley committed to the health reforms, despite public skepticism. After 1996, the reforms were largely rolled back by her successor in the health portfolio, Bill English.

== Prime Minister (1997–1999) ==
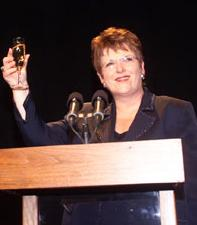
- Premiership of Jenny Shipley; 8 December 1997 – 10 December 1999
- Monarch: Elizabeth II
- Cabinet: Fourth National Government of New Zealand
- Party: New Zealand National Party
- Appointed by: Michael Hardie Boys
- Seat: Premier House

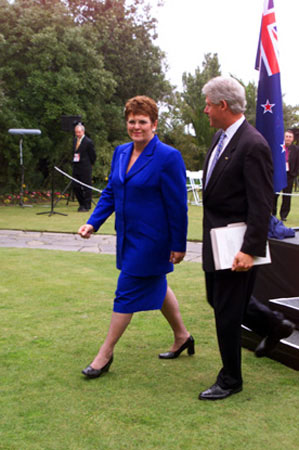
Shipley (centre) with United States President Bill Clinton, 15 September 1999.

Shipley grew increasingly frustrated and disillusioned with the cautious pace of the National-led government under Jim Bolger, and with what she saw as the disproportionate influence of New Zealand First. She began gathering support to replace Bolger in mid-1997. Later that year, while Bolger attended the Commonwealth Heads of Government Meeting, Shipley convinced a majority of her National Party colleagues to back her bid for the leadership. When Bolger returned to New Zealand, he discovered that Shipley had enough support in the party room to oust him. Facing an untenable situation, he resigned, and Shipley was unanimously elected to succeed him. As leader of the governing party, she became prime minister on 8 December 1997. On 21 May 1998 Shipley was appointed to the Privy Council, and was given the right to the style The Right Honourable for life.

Despite continued economic growth, the Shipley government became increasingly politically unstable. In particular, the relationship between National and New Zealand First deteriorated. While Bolger had been able to maintain good relations with New Zealand First and with its leader, Deputy Prime Minister Winston Peters, the alliance became strained after Shipley rose to power. Finally, on 14 August 1998, Shipley sacked Peters from Cabinet.

Shipley was nicknamed "the perfumed steamroller," when she first became prime minister. During a later interview with Guyon Espiner, Shipley stated that female politicians were labelled differently in the media; she uses the example that male politicians are called bold where female politicians are called vindictive; although she notes that this is an observation, not something that hurts her personally. Shipley's ascension to the leadership marked a shift to the right politically with subtle returns to the neo-liberal policies of the first term of the Bolger government. This was labelled by some commentators (usually critically) as "Jennycide", a portmanteau of "Jenny" and "genocide".

A series of further welfare reforms were undertaken in 1998, including cutting the Sickness Benefit rate to that of the Unemployment Benefit. Emergency Benefit applicants faced compulsory budgeting advice for repeated withdrawals of the benefit. A "Work First" set of policies designed to reduce long-term welfare dependency were also launched, building on the work-for-welfare "Community Wage" scheme launched in 1997 that saw those on Unemployment Benefit eligible for an additional $22 per-week if they participated in community work. The same year, a controversial Code of Social and Family Responsibility that sought to instill family values was proposed and never passed.

Shipley, along with the New Zealand Tourism Board, backed the quasi-national emblem of the silver fern on a black background as a possible alternative flag, along the lines of the Canadian flag, but she took pains to publicly dissociate herself from Bolger's support for republicanism. As the debate continued in 1999, the Princess Royal visited New Zealand, and Shipley stated, "I am an unashamed royal supporter, along with many New Zealanders". However, the debate was muted by the controversy surrounding Tourism Board contracts going to the public-relations firm Saatchi & Saatchi, whose World CEO Kevin Roberts, also an advocate of the silver fern flag, was a good friend of Shipley.

The APEC Summit was hosted in Auckland in September 1999. Shipley met with the President of the United States, Bill Clinton, in one of only two state visits to New Zealand by a US president.

Shipley was the first prime minister to attend the gay and lesbian Hero Parade, being the first National Party leader to seek to make electoral overtures to the gay and lesbian voting public. She advocated lowering the alcohol purchase age from 20 to 18 and achieved this in 1999. This was part of her expressed desire to expand the traditional National Party voting base.

Shipley became a member of the Council of Women World Leaders, an international network of current and former women presidents and prime ministers.

== Defeat and resignation ==
Shipley led the National Party into the 1999 election, hoping to become the first woman to be elected prime minister in her own right. However, she was defeated by the Labour Party, also led by a woman, Helen Clark. This election was a significant moment in history for New Zealand as it was the first New Zealand election in which the leaders of both major parties were women.

Shipley served as the Leader of the Opposition until October 2001, when Bill English took over as National Party leader. She retired from Parliament in January 2002.

In the 2003 New Year Honours, Shipley was appointed a Distinguished Companion of the New Zealand Order of Merit, for services as a Member of Parliament.

== Health ==
Shipley suffered a heart attack in 2000, leading to an emergency angioplasty procedure. She made modifications to her lifestyle and lost weight, though she was diagnosed with diabetes in 2004. She underwent gastric bypass surgery in late 2007.

== Life after politics ==
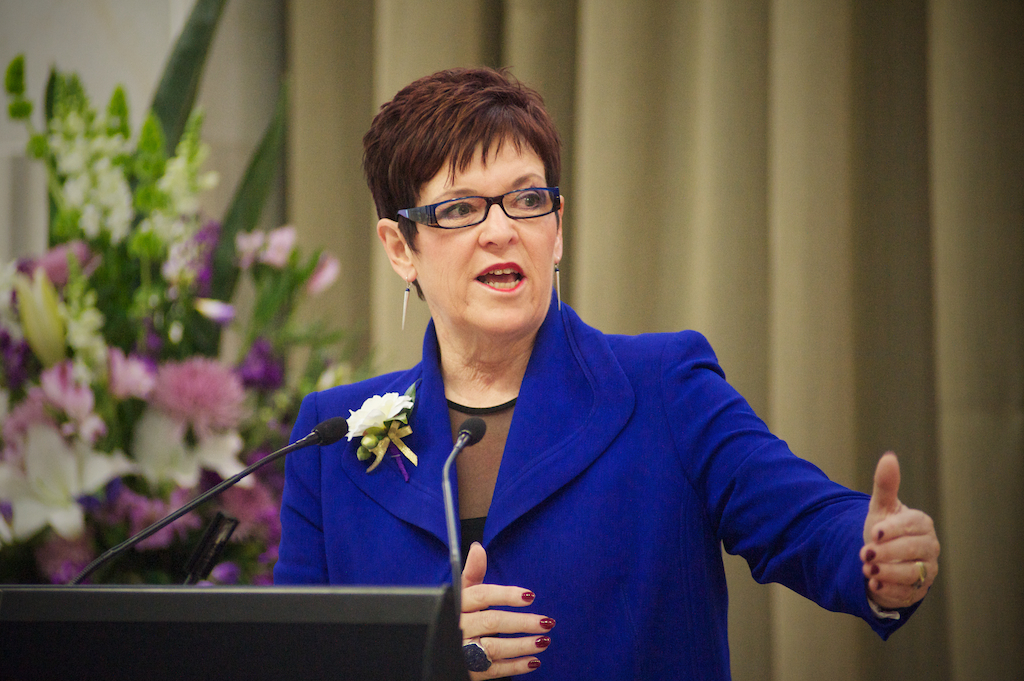
Shipley attending the Wellington celebration of the anniversary of suffrage day, 19 September 2013

After leaving politics, Shipley involved herself with business and charitable interests. In 2007, she joined the financial services firm Source Sentinel, and from 2009 to 2018 was chair of the Genesis Energy Limited board. As of 2012, she was on the board of the New Zealand branch of the state-owned China Construction Bank. She resigned from the bank's board after being prosecuted for her role in the collapse of construction company Mainzeal.

=== Prosecution for insolvency of Mainzeal ===
In December 2012, Shipley resigned from the board of directors of Mainzeal Property & Construction (MPCL), which went into receivership on 6 February 2013. At mid-day on 5 February 2013 she was one of four independent directors who resigned from the board of Mainzeal Group Ltd. MPCL and Mainzeal Group Limited are part of the Richina group, controlled and majority owned by Yan Ci Lang (also known as Richard Yan). Mainzeal went into liquidation on 28 February 2013, owing some NZ$110 million. In May 2015, the receiver of Mainzeal, BDO, filed a civil lawsuit against the former Mainzeal directors, including Shipley, for an alleged breach of directors' duties. In February 2019, the High Court of New Zealand found that the Mainzeal directors had breached their duty to avoid reckless trading and assessed their total liability at NZ$36 million, of which Shipley's share was assessed at NZ$6 million. Within a week of the court delivering its verdict, Shipley resigned from her chair of the China Construction Bank New Zealand. An appeal against this judgment was filed along with a counter claim brought by the original plaintiffs for a vastly higher award against the directors. Both appeals failed. In August 2023 New Zealand's Supreme Court upheld the long-contested judgements, determining "“Mainzeal was balance sheet insolvent from 2005, albeit this was not apparent from its financial statements” and ordered the four directors, of whom Shipley was one, to pay $39.8m together with interest, although the liability of Shipley is limited to $6.6m plus interest.

=== Honours ===
Shipley accepted redesignation as a Dame Companion of the New Zealand Order of Merit on 14 August 2009, following the reintroduction of titular honours by the Fifth National Government.

=== Reality TV appearances ===
Also in 2009, Shipley appeared on an episode of the television reality/travel show Intrepid Journeys, where she visited Namibia. She later started a charity to help a school she came across on that trip called the Namibian Educational Trust. Shipley chaired Global Women NZ until 2015, and was replaced as Patron of the Sir Edmund Hillary Outdoor Pursuits Centre by Graeme Dingle in 2019, and was the New Zealand National Heart Foundation's campaign "Go Red for Women".

New Zealand Parliament
Preceded by Rob Talbot	Member of Parliament for Ashburton; 1987–1993	Constituency abolished
New constituency	Member of Parliament for Rakaia; 1993–2002	Succeeded by Brian Connell
Political offices
Preceded by Michael Cullen	Minister for Social Welfare; 1990–1993	Succeeded by Peter Gresham
Preceded by Margaret Shields	Minister of Women's Affairs; 1990–1996	Succeeded by Christine Fletcher
Preceded by Bill Birch	Minister of Health; 1993–1996	Succeeded by Bill English
Preceded by Jim Bolger	Prime Minister of New Zealand; 1997–1999	Succeeded by Helen Clark
Preceded by Helen Clark	Leader of the Opposition; 1999–2001	Succeeded by Bill English
Party political offices
Preceded by Jim Bolger	Leader of the National Party; 1997–2001	Succeeded by Bill English
Diplomatic posts
Preceded by Mahathir Mohamad	Chair of the Asia-Pacific Economic Cooperation; 1999	Succeeded by Hassanal Bolkiah
