= Taunoa v Attorney-General =

- Court: Supreme Court of New Zealand
- Full case name: Taunoa and Ors v The Attorney-General and Anor.
- Decided: 31 August 2007
- Citation: [2007] NZSC 70; [2008] 1 NZLR 429
- Transcript: Available here

Case history
- Prior actions: High Court (2004) 7 HRNZ 379 and (2004) 8 HRNZ 53; Court of Appeal [2006] 2 NZLR 457

Court membership
- Judges sitting: Elias CJ, Blanchard, Tipping, McGrath and Henry JJ

Keywords
- New Zealand Bill of Rights Act 1990, Prisoners' rights in New Zealand, Human rights, Baigent's case

Taunoa v Attorney-General was a case in the Supreme Court of New Zealand concerning breaches of prisoners' Bill of Rights protected rights by the Department of Corrections in the Behaviour Management Regime programme at Auckland Prison between 1998 and 2004.

== Behaviour Management Regime ==
In March 1998, 25 prisoners had taken over their cellblock and started fires in protest against new cell search policies at Auckland Prison, known as Paremoremo Prison. In response to the riot the Department of Corrections instituted and operated from 1998 to 2004 a programme at the prison known as the "Behaviour Modification Regime" and later "Behaviour Management Regime" (BMR). The programme was designed to deter bad behaviour of difficult to control prisoners through principles of behaviour modification and involved a progression through increasingly less restrictive phases. Around 200 prisoners were subjected to the BMR.

BMR involved "cell confinement and the denial of association with other inmates for 22 to 23 hours a day, combined with a significant reduction in the ordinary conditions and privileges of maximum security inmates in the east division. All prisoners began on the most restrictive phase and remained there for at least 14 days. Privileges were gradually restored as prisoners moved to later phases, but misconduct could result in summary regression to a previous phase." Prison bosses were found to have ignored warning from psychiatric staff that the programme was too harsh and a breach of international guidelines. In 2000 the Office of the Ombudsman had raised questions as to the legality of the programme.

Aspects of the treatment of prisoners on BMR included:

- Cell conditions "well short of the proper standard of hygiene";
- Poor natural light and a lack of fresh air;
- Unacceptable laundry conditions;
- An "unnecessarily controlling" rationing of toilet paper;
- Not allowed watches or calendars in early stages;
- The prison Superintendent and medical officers failed to monitor individual prisoners regularly;
- Inadequate opportunity to exercise;
- No effective privacy;
- Prisoners were sometimes left in cells naked;
- Routine and unlawful strip searches;
- No rehabilitation programmes;
- No access to books or television;
- Prisoners were given unclear and inadequate information about the BMR;
- Improper seizure of items, including prisoners' legal papers during cell searches; and
- Verbal abuse of prisoners by guards was common.

== Legal background ==
Five prisoners launched legal action against the programme. In the High Court the BMR was found to have been in breach of section 23(5) of the Bill of Rights Act 1990 (BoRA). Section 23(5) of BoRA states that, "Everyone deprived of liberty shall be treated with humanity and with respect for the inherent dignity of the person." The High Court granted declarations that the prisoners Bill of Rights had been breached and awarded damages.

Damages for the five prisoners were set at: Taunoa, $65,000; Robinson, $40,000; Tofts, $25,000; Kidman, $8,000; Gunbie, $2,000.

The Court of Appeal upheld the finding and awards of the High Court, and also held that putting one of the prisoners, Lesley Tofts, into the BMR, was disproportionately severe treatment contrary to section 9 of BoRA. Section 9 of BoRA states, "Everyone has the right not to be subjected to torture or to cruel, degrading, or disproportionately severe treatment or punishment."

Three of the prisoners appealed against the lower courts findings that the BMR did not breach section 9 in their case, sought higher awards of damages, sought declarations that their rights to the observance of natural justice as protected by section 27(1) of BoRA had been breached as "they were not given opportunities to be heard on the placement and its continued application to them", and a court direction that the Attorney-General conduct an independent investigation into their treatment on the BMR.

The Attorney-General cross-appealed against the decision of the Court of Appeal seeking to lower or extinguish the awards of damages in respect of all prisoners except Tofts.

== Judgments ==
All of the judges of the court issued their own judgments. By a majority the Court dismissed the appeals. The cross-appeals were also allowed to an extent and the damages reduced to: Taunoa, $35,000; Robinson, $20,000; and Kidman $4,000. The Court also dismissed the applications for declarations that natural justice rights had been breached and for a direction to Corrections to hold an independent inquiry.

=== Behaviour Management Regime ===
All of the court held that the prisoners' rights under s 23(5) of BoRA had been breached; and by a majority, with Elias CJ dissenting, held there had been no breach of s 9 of the Bill of Rights. However, in the case of Taunoa, who spent 2 years and 8 months (the longest) on BMR, Justice Blanchard like Elias CJ held there had been a breach of s 9; "To inflict an unlawful regime with the features of BMR on a prisoner for that length of time is conduct on the part of a government department which must in this country be regarded as outrageous and indecent."

=== Section 9, Bill of Rights Act ===
There were three different interpretations of section 9 of the Bill of Rights Act given in the judgments.

Chief Justice Elias held that s 9 is concerned with the "prevention of treatment properly characterised as “inhuman”"; and the section is aimed at just two categorise of treatment: torture, and "any form of treatment or punishment which is incompatible with the dignity and worth of the human person".

Elias categorised torture as "the deliberate infliction of severe suffering, often for a purpose such as obtaining information".

Cruel, degrading or disproportionately severe treatment, Elias held must be "seriously deficient" or "grossly disproportionate" rather than merely "excessive". Adopting European and Canadian authorities, Elias held that treatment must "deprive inmates of the minimal civilised measure of life's necessities" according to the "contemporary standards of decency" or be "so excessive as to outrage standards of decency".

Elias CJ also held that for a breach of s 9 to occur does not require proof of demonstrated harm to the person subjected to the treatment.

In finding that the BMR amounted to a breach of s 9, Elias CJ held, "In combination, these conditions amounted to a serious denial of human needs for dignity, exercise, fresh air, purpose, fair treatment, and society. They are properly characterised as inhuman by contemporary standards of decency".

Justice Blanchard adopted a classification of section 9 which differentiated between four forms of treatment, which Justice McGrath agreed with.

- Torture - "involves the deliberate infliction of severe physical or mental suffering for a particular purpose, such as obtaining information."
- Cruel treatment - lacks the ulterior motive of torture but the resulting suffering severe or deliberately inflicted.
- Degrading treatment - "gravely humiliates and debases the person subjected to it, whether or not that is its purpose".
- Disproportionately severe treatment - "inhuman" treatment or punishment; behaviour "New Zealanders would nevertheless regard as so out of proportion to the particular circumstances as to cause shock and revulsion".

Justice Tipping, with whom Justice Henry agreed, adopts another classification of the forms of treatment.

- Cruel treatment - "For a person lawfully in prison, the concept of cruel treatment or punishment denotes conduct which causes physical or mental damage or distress substantially beyond what is inherent in the confinement and the legitimate restraint and disciplining of the person concerned."
- Degrading treatment - "some additional element either of degree or of kind in order to lift it into the more serious category of treatment which s 9 is designed to cover".
- Disproportionately severe treatment -"conduct which is so severe as to shock the national conscience".

=== Bill of Rights Act damages ===
All of the judgments addressed the issue of how Bill of Rights Act damages should be set.

Chief Justice Elias held that damages for a breach of the Bill of Rights must be "adequate not only to compensate for the suffering caused but to vindicate the important rights breached". And in each circumstance, "The vindication adopted must recognise the importance of the right and the gravity of the breach."

Justice Blanchard held, damages should be moderate, but, "enough to provide an incentive to the defendant and other State agencies not to repeat the infringing conduct and also to ensure that the plaintiff does not reasonably feel that the award is trivialising of the breach."

Justice Tipping, with whom Justice Henry agreed, held that damages must both compensate the victim and also vindicate the breached right, "in order to protect society’s interests in the observance of fundamental rights and freedoms".

Justice McGrath stated, "The amount of compensation should be assessed by reference to what is appropriate in the New Zealand social, historical and legal context in order to vindicate the right in all the circumstances."

== Significance ==
The Taunoa decision in the High Court resulted in the Government passing the Prisoners' and Victims' Claims Act 2005 because "reports, fuelled by the media, that inmates and ex-inmates were planning to lodge dozens more claims, raised fears that the Courts were about to be inundated with calls for substantial pay-outs." For the prisoners who had their awards set in Taunoa, because the law had the retrospective effect that "any damages eventually awarded to them following the final resolution of the proceedings would be held by the Secretary of Justice for a specified period to enable the victims of the plaintiffs' crimes to make claims against the amount."
