= Make It 16 =

Make It 16 may refer to:

- Make It 16 (New Zealand), a youth-led campaign group in New Zealand to lower the voting age in general and local elections to 16
- Make it 16 (Australia), a youth-led campaign group in Australia to lower the voting age in all Australian elections to 16
