= Arthur William Taylor =

High-profile former prison inmate

Arthur William Taylor (born 1956) is a high-profile former prison inmate who served time in Auckland Prison at Paremoremo, Auckland, New Zealand. In 2016 he had spent 38 years in prison and had a total of 152 convictions. As a prison inmate, he achieved a public profile as a "prison lawyer" due to initiating court action on behalf of himself and prisoners' rights. In 2017, he initiated successful legal action on behalf of former prisoner David Tamihere. On 24 January 2019, Taylor's appearance before a parole board resulted in parole being granted, and he was released on 11 February 2019. He had said not long before release that he wanted to gain a law degree and continue his social work.

== Background & criminal history ==
Taylor's parents were farmers in the Hokianga district before moving to Masterton where they ran a small business. Taylor says they were a loving family but that he found schoolwork boring and so often used to skip class. He had never appeared in court but, at age 11 missing school was enough to get him sent to Epuni Boys home for "NUPC" – not being under proper control. In a letter to the Race relations Commission in 2017, he said being sent to Epuni was as much a surprise to his parents as it was to him.

A psychological report written shortly after he arrived at Epuni said: "He appears as basically warm-hearted, good-natured, co-operative and easy going, with a tendency to be impulsive at times. He is also shown to be sentimental, emotional and artistic with a liking for people". Altogether, Taylor was sent to Epuni three times and spent a total of 18 months in the institution. He committed burglaries and car conversion in the course of running away from Epuni, although his first conviction was for forging entries in his savings bank deposit book at the age of 16. While in Epuni he also formed associations with youngsters who went on to become serious criminals, and said "I was educated in the ways of crime". In 2015, while still in prison, Taylor received financial compensation and a letter of apology from the Ministry of Social Development for his incarceration and treatment at Epuni.

By 2016 Taylor had a total of 152 convictions and had spent 38 years in prison. His convictions are for fraud, burglary, aggravated robbery, kidnapping, firearms offences, drugs offences and escaping from custody.

== Behaviour in prison ==
=== Escapes ===
Taylor says he has escaped from prison twelve times, including twice in Australia. In 1998, he and three others, including murderer Graeme Burton, escaped from Auckland Prison by scaling the walls at Paremoremo, snipping through the wire at the top and getting away in a waiting Toyota Hiace. They spent a few days in a millionaire's bach in the Coromandel. Taylor was caught after a massive police operation and returned to prison. He was released at the end of his sentence in 2001.

Taylor was sent back to prison in December 2004 after being charged with drug and firearms offences and possessing explosives. He escaped again in 2005 when he was being taken to a family group conference at Child Youth and Family (CYFs) offices in Wellington to discuss the custody of his child. He was assisted by Manu Royal who pointed an air pistol at the two prison officers escorting him and told them to unlock Taylor's handcuffs. Taylor was recaptured after he fell through the ceiling in a downtown Wellington building and landed on top of a startled woman in a toilet cubicle.

=== Paternity claim ===
A girl was born to Carolyn Taylor, Arthur's wife, in June 2007, while she was serving time at Auckland Region Women's Correctional Facility. Carolyn Taylor had been sent there in December 2006. In 2010, a NZ Herald article reported that a Child, Youth and Family spokeswoman had said that Taylor was recognised by the agency as the father of a girl born in 2007 because he was named on the birth certificate by his wife. Taylor received regular visits in his prison from the child until she had just turned 2 years old. A Corrections spokesperson said "we do not believe he is the biological father of a child born in June 2007".

=== Appearances at parole board ===
In March 2017, Taylor was serving a sentence of 17 years and 6 months when he made his 18th appearance before a parole board. The sentence was for serious violent and drug-related offending. Parole was denied, the board deeming him too dangerous for early release. His next appearance before the board was scheduled for March 2018. On 1 March 2018, the outcome of a parole board hearing was announced; the board denied Taylor parole on the grounds that he was likely to reoffend. A parole board hearing was scheduled in 2019.

At a parole board hearing on 24 January 2019, Taylor was granted parole after previously being denied 19 times. He was released on 11 February 2019.

== Prison lawyer ==
In the early 1980s, Taylor began representing himself in court to seek reductions in his sentences, get convictions quashed, or get his security classification downgraded. Taylor does not have a law degree but studied for a legal executive qualification. He says he "couldn’t get out of prison to sit the examinations” so never actually graduated. Taylor admits that most of his cases have been to further his own ends. He started advocating for prisoners’ rights largely as a result of Corrections' decision to segregate him from other prisoners for eight months. In a subsequent investigation into Taylor's treatment by Corrections, the Ombudsman described his conditions during that period as “cruel and inhumane for the purposes of the UN Convention Against Torture”.

Sociologist Dr Greg Newbold says Taylor is "bloody intelligent" and craves the intellectual stimulation he gets from taking legal action against Corrections. "He's playing a clever game of chess with the authorities and enjoying his victories. He gets a big kick out of that." Taylor's sister says that when he wins a case, the court awards him costs. In 2009, the IRD assessed his income at more than $100,000.

Because of all the legal cases he initiated, for a while Corrections allowed him to use a room in the prison equipped with a computer and boxes for his legal papers. Officers used to refer to it as "Arthur's office".

=== Smoking ban in prison ===
In 2010, Corrections Minister Judith Collins announced that from 1 July 2011, prisons in New Zealand would be smoke free and both prisoners and staff would be banned from smoking. About two thirds of prisoners were smokers and Taylor challenged the ban in court arguing the prison manager had no power under the Corrections Act to introduce the ban. In December 2012, Justice Murray Gilbert ruled that the ban, which by then had been in force for 17 months, was "unlawful, invalid and of no effect". The Government then enacted legislation to make the ban lawful. In January 2013, Taylor filed further proceedings claiming those amendments were also illegal. The High Court ruled in his favour. The Government responded by changing the Corrections Amendment Regulations declaring tobacco and equipment used for smoking tobacco to be unauthorised items. This meant cigarettes, as opposed to smoking, were no longer allowed in prison.

=== Voting ban on prisoners ===
In December 2010 Parliament amended the Electoral Act 1993, extending to all prisoners a prohibition on voting that was formerly restricted to prisoners sentenced to three or more years’ imprisonment. In Taylor v Attorney-General, Taylor sought to have this extension overturned, although before Parliament even passed the bill, Attorney-General Chris Finlayson had declared that “the blanket disenfranchisement of prisoners appears to be inconsistent with Section 12 of the Bill of Rights Act and that it cannot be justified”.

The High Court ruled that the ban on prisoner voting could not be overturned (by the Court) because the legislation had been lawfully passed. However, Justice Ellis described the voting ban as "constitutionally objectionable" and the Court agreed with the Attorney General that the new law was inconsistent with the New Zealand Bill of Rights Act 1990. The Attorney-General appealed this decision arguing that the courts did not have jurisdiction to declare a law passed by parliament to be inconsistent with the Bill of Rights. The case was reconsidered by the Court of Appeal in May 2017 and dismissed the Attorney General's claim.

=== Media interviews of prisoners ===
In 2013, following his legal action against the smoking ban, TVNZ and other media outlets requested permission from the Corrections Department to interview Taylor in prison. Corrections declined, claiming there were security risks involved. In 2015, Taylor took the case to the Court of Appeal which ruled that the interview could go ahead. In his decision, Justice Harrison said there were numerous mistakes in the department's decision to refuse the interview and said Corrections apparently did not want to give Taylor a "voice". The department had spent $86,000 of taxpayers' money in court and legal fees contesting the action.

The department subsequently had to accept several media requests to speak to him, including one that Radio New Zealand had made in October 2014.

=== Witness C in Tamihere case ===
In 2016, Taylor brought a private prosecution for perjury against Witness C, who already had permanent name suppression. Witness C had testified against David Tamihere, leading to Tamihere's conviction for the murders of Urban Höglin and Heidi Paakkonen on the Coromandel Peninsula in 1989. In August 2017, Witness C was found guilty on eight charges of perjury. Taylor was represented in court by lawyer Murray Gibson, who said the verdict called into question everything about Mr Tamihere's conviction. On 25 October 2017, Witness C was sentenced to 8 years 7 months on each of the eight charges of perjury, the sentences to be served concurrently. Witness C's permanent name suppression was revoked on 26 April 2018, and he was revealed as convicted double murderer Roberto Conchie Harris.

== Treatment in prison ==
In June 2011 Taylor was placed on ‘directed segregation’ after he was caught with a cell phone in his possession. Although segregation is normally imposed for a maximum of 14 days, Corrections kept him in these lock-down conditions for more than eight months. This means he was locked in his cell 23 hours a day and unable to communicate with other prisoners. As part of his segregation regime, Corrections placed Taylor into the High Care Unit (HCU) reserved for difficult prisoners.

=== Ombudsman's report ===
Taylor complained to the Ombudsman who conducted a Special Investigation into the way Corrections was managing him. Prison management argued that because staff provided him with an office for his numerous legal issues, Taylor presented a "significant ongoing threat to the security and good order of this institution.” The Ombudsman, Beverley Wakem, said prison management "did not provide any information which showed the risk remained (beyond the original 14 days) and as such, an extension was required".

The Ombudsman also wrote: "The placement of Mr Taylor into the HCU, along with the restrictions imposed by the management plan… was more akin to a punishment regime" and that “Accommodation for those prisoners currently undergoing a period of segregation is well below standard and could be considered cruel and inhuman for the purposes of the Convention against Torture.”

=== Claim against Corrections ===
In 2022 Taylor sued Corrections for NZ$1.45 million for wide-ranging claims spanning events from June 2011 until March 2018. He alleged serious mistreatment, designed to disrupt his legal work against Corrections and to prevent him assisting other prisoners to assert their basic rights. He won damages of $18,000 for excessive strip searches, privacy breaches and being denied time out of his cell.

== Release and parole violations ==
Taylor was released from prison in February 2019 after spending nearly 40 years inside. He was paroled to Dunedin to live with law student, Hazel Heal. He wanted to study law at the University of Otago but was declined entry at the start of the academic year. Taylor said he will continue fighting for prisoners' rights. Corrections psychologist, Richard Greer, said Mr Taylor's likelihood of committing further violent crime was now low.

In late May 2020, the Wellington High Court ruled against Taylor's interim injunction against the Department of Correction's decision to remove him from his home north of Wellington. In early June 2020, Taylor was recalled to prison after defying an order banning him from associating with a woman in Wellington. On 19 June, Taylor was charged with possession of methamphetamine and breaching prison release conditions.

Taylor was subsequently paroled to Dunedin a second time. In early December 2020, Taylor received 11 new drug charges, some of which carry a maximum penalty of life imprisonment. These drug charges relate to the period that he was staying in Wellington between 1 February and 13 June 2020. In January 2021, Taylor was bailed to a Dunedin address while awaiting separate trials in Wellington and Dunedin for various drug charges and parole violations. Under the terms of his parole, he has to abide by strict conditions including a 7pm–7am curfew and GPS monitoring.

In May 2021, Taylor was a witness to a stabbing at the Countdown supermarket in Dunedin.

In 2022, Taylor supported anti-vaccine mandate protesters who camped in Dunedin's Octagon in solidarity with the Convoy 2022 protest in Wellington. He also served as their spokesperson and legal adviser. Taylor claimed that the Dunedin Octagon protest had contributed to a drop in the crime rate in the CBD and Octagon area. In early April, Taylor initially claimed that supporters would be travelling from other cities and towns to support the Dunedin protesters after the Dunedin City Council issued a letter ordering them to leave. The Dunedin protesters subsequently left the site on 11 April. Taylor attributed the protesters' decision to end the protest to concerns about how local authorities and Police would respond to the protest.

== Book ==
Taylor has written an autobiography called Prison Break: The Extraordinary Life and Crimes of New Zealand's Most Infamous Escapee, which is published by Allen & Unwin and due to be released on 3 August 2021. The book contained an account of his forced transfer from Auckland Prison to Waikeria Prison in 2017 under Operation Swift, which was recorded on CCTV. Prison Break also contained a few sentences from an Australian doctor's evidence about how he was injured during Operation Swift. Fearing that the Department of Corrections would seek to block the release of Prison Break, Taylor made a preliminary application seeking clarification from the Wellington High Court. The incident is part of Taylor's civil suit against Corrections, seeking NZ$1 million in damages and aggravated damages. On 11 June, Associate Judge Kenneth Johnston ruled that Taylor had the court's permission to use seven quotes from the doctor's evidence in his book.
