= Prisoners' rights in New Zealand =

Prisoners in New Zealand are afforded numerous, but not all, human rights. Criticisms by a United Nations report in 2014 highlighted various issues that constitute ill-treatment of prisoners, such as remand prisoners being routinely held on lock-down for 19 hours per day, an increasingly strict prison regime, and the mixing of adult and youth prisoners.

New Zealand has international obligations, being party to international treaties and covenants such as the United Nations Convention against Torture, Inhuman or Degrading Treatment or Punishment (CAT) and the International Covenant on Civil and Political Rights (ICCPR). For example, Article 10 of the latter provides that all persons deprived of their liberty shall be treated with humanity and with respect for the inherent dignity of the human person. Many human rights are embodied under various domestic legislation, including the New Zealand Bill of Rights Act 1990 (NZBORA) and the Human Rights Act 1993 (HRA). For example, section 9 of NZBORA affirms that everyone has the right not to be subjected to torture or to cruel, degrading, or disproportionately severe treatment or punishment.

== New Zealand prison demographics ==
In 2017, the New Zealand prison population exceeded 10,000 persons for the first time. As at March 2017, there are 9,333 male prisoners and 702 female prisoners being held across 18 prisons in New Zealand. The most populated prison in New Zealand is Mt Eden Corrections Facility (MECF), with 1,032 prisoners, closely followed by Rimutaka Prison with 1,007 prisoners. One New Zealand prison, Auckland South Corrections Facility (ASCF) was operated by Serco under a Public Private Partnership with the Department of Corrections.

=== Female imprisonment ===
Women make up only a small proportion of the total New Zealand prison population. In 1940 the figure was 3%; in 2014 it was 6.4%; and in 2017 7% of prisoners were women. Initially women were held in the same prisons as men. It was not until 1913, and after much protest, that the first women's prison was established, at Addington. By 2018, New Zealand had established three female prisons: Auckland Women's Correction Facility, Arohata, and Christchurch Women's Corrections Facility.

=== Male imprisonment ===
Men are regularly given longer sentences than women for the same crimes, consequently enhancing the statistics for male prisoners. By 2018, New Zealand established 15 male prisons which are scattered around the North and South Island. Female prisoners have often been held in male prisons due to the overflowing prison population. Since the 1940s, prison capacities have grown rapidly, especially between 1995 and 2007, during which the number of incarcerated persons increased by 70%. The population continues to rapidly grow and reached the highest numbers in 2015 and 2016, ultimately peaking New Zealand's in 2017.

=== Maori imprisonment ===
Māori are well over-represented at all levels of the criminal justice system. Prison statistics are no different. In 1840 Māori represented 3% of prisoners. In 2014 this had risen to 50.8%, despite Māori only making up 15% of the population.

== History ==
The first New Zealand prisons originated in the 1840s; they reflected English influence and practice. By 1878 the Colony had 30 small prisons. They were flimsy, underfunded and under-resourced. For example, New Plymouth Prison comprised two cells and a small outdoor yard.

From early on, the prison system was heavily criticized for the day-to-day conditions prisoners endured - such as damp, cramped cells and long hours of isolation. A Royal Commission of Inquiry in 1868 failed to precipitate any changes. In 1880 a standardized prison system was introduced under the watch of Arthur Hume, the first Inspector General of Prisons. This new system focused on economical administration and acting as a reformative deterrent to crime. Conditions became harsher for those on the inside, including rations being cut and communications between prisoners prohibited.

In 1909 (and coincidentally, upon Captain Hume's retirement), prison reform was sought. The Crimes Amendment Act 1910 saw teachers appointed to the prisons, allowed for small wages to be paid to prisoners, and allowed for the release of prisoners on probation.

From 1949 to 1960, Sam Barnett, the Secretary of Justice, was in charge of the prison system. Under Barnetts' administration, extensive reforms took place. This included greater rations, improved education and library resources, appointment of prison psychologists and improved recreation- and welfare-services. Periodic detention was also introduced, which allowed for supervised community work.

From the 1950s prison populations (known in New Zealand as the "prison muster") rapidly increased, in line with the increasing crime-rate.

As of 2019 the Corrections Act 2004 provides the legislative framework for the administration of the prison system by the Department of Corrections. Today there is a wider range of sentences available, including (but not limited to) community work, supervision, community detention, home detention and imprisonment.

== Controversial rights ==
The rights of prisoners invoke differing views. Below are some rights that have caused controversy in recent times, namely the right to vote, preventive detention and prisoners with mental health issues.

=== Right to vote ===
New Zealand has long enjoyed the status of being a world leader when it comes to voting rights. On 19 September 1893, New Zealand became the first country to allow women the right to vote. This can be largely accredited to the advocating efforts of Kate Sheppard. Today, the right to vote is expressly provided for in domestic legislation; both in section 12 of the New Zealand Bill of Rights Act 1990 and section 74 of the Electoral Act 1993 and international treaties New Zealand is party to, including the International Covenant on Civil and Political Rights.

Despite this, prisoners serving a term of three years or more, life imprisonment, or preventive detention are barred from electoral registration, and therefore from casting their electoral vote. At present, this equates to roughly 2550 prisoners.

Taking away the right to vote originated from early Roman times when those arrested were declared “civilly dead”. In the last century the rights of prisoners to vote has swung back and forth. In 1852 all prisoners were barred from voting. In 1975 we saw a complete turnaround and all prisoners were again allowed the right to vote. In 2010, the Fifth National Government passed the Electoral (Disqualification of Sentenced Prisoners) Act 2010, which stripped all prisoners of the right to vote while serving their sentences.

Those advocating for the ban argue that punishment for prisoners should include the loss of some rights to reflect the seriousness of the crime. In addition, there are also a number of practical difficulties. For example, if prisoners were allowed to vote this would disproportionately affect an electorate. At the time of the enactment, the then Solicitor General John McGrath QC also argued that a partial ban is more justifiable than a complete blanket ban.

On the other hand, the barring is controversial because it denies fundamental civil liberties to persons who have already been punished for their crimes. Furthermore, the abolition of such a right stands in stark contrast to the world trend of widening civil liberties of prisoners, with the exception of Australia who has recently introduced a blanket ban on prisoner's right to vote. This denial also sets a dangerous precedent for the removal of other human rights for prisoners, and also contributes to inequality of all persons.

In the 2015 decision of Taylor v Attorney-General, the High Court made a formal declaration that a statute that prohibited prisoners from voting is inconsistent with the New Zealand Bill of Rights Act 1990. The decision was later upheld by the Court of Appeal. The judge declared that the Electoral (Disqualification of Sentenced Prisoners) Amendment Act 2010, which stripped all voting rights in general elections from prisoners, was an unjustified limitation on the right to vote contained in s 12 of the Bill of Rights and unable to be justified under that Act. A formal declaration of inconsistency was issued as a result of the case. This was the first time a court had recognised that a formal declaration of inconsistency is an available remedy for statutory breaches of the Bill of Rights.

On 23 November 2019, the Minister of Justice Andrew Little announced that the Sixth Labour Government would be amending the Electoral Amendment Bill to allow prisoners who had been sentenced to less than three years in prison to vote in time for the 2020 New Zealand general election; reversing the previous National Government's decision to ban all prisoners from voting. While Little's announcement was welcomed by Green MP Golriz Ghahraman and prisoner advocates, National Party leader Simon Bridges criticised the Government for being "soft on crime" and vowed that a National Government would reverse any such law change.

On 30 April 2025, The Sixth National Government of New Zealand Justice Minister Paul Goldsmith announced that the Government would introduce legislation to reinstate a blanket ban on prisoners voting, describing it as a reversal of the previous Labour Government's "soft on crime" policy.

=== Preventive detention ===
Preventive detention is a special type of sentence provided for under section 87 of the Sentencing Act 2002. In New Zealand's justice system, preventative detention has been imposed on convicted criminals for decades, but has been used with increasing frequency since the 1980s, and is described It is a form of imprisonment, with no release date until approved by the Parole Board. It occurs when the individual is defined as “a dangerous person and is assessed as posing a substantial risk of grave harm to the public or specific individuals.” The decision to sentence a person to preventive decision relies heavily on predicting the individual's likelihood of committing future crimes.

Preventive detention is heavily criticized because it is a form of arbitrary detainment where a person has not actually been charged with, or convicted of an offence, but poses a risk of offending. Several provisions under the New Zealand Bill of Rights Act 1990 are relevant, namely:

- Section 9: Everyone has the right not to be subjected to torture or to cruel, degrading, or disproportionately severe treatment or punishment.
- Section 22: Everyone has the right not to be arbitrarily arrested or detained, and
- Section 27: Every person has the right to the observance of the principles of natural justice by any tribunal or other public authority which has the power to make a determination in respect of that person's rights, obligations or interests protected or recognized by law.

Despite this, section 5 of the New Zealand Bill of Rights Act 1990 limits these rights where it can be “demonstrably justified in a free and democratic society”. The limitation of human rights was discussed in Moonen v Film and Literature Board of Review (1999) which remains the relevant authority today.

Preventive detention is justified on the basis that it only applies to a small group of offenders who fit the definition of a “dangerous person and is assessed as posing a substantial risk of grave harm to the public or specific individuals” and relies on the exercise of discretion when certain conditions are met. In a report by the Human Rights Committee dated 15 December 2003, the Committee was of the view that preventive detention was not arbitrary, nor did it offend the principle of the presumption of innocence.

However, there remains strong opposition to preventive detention. It was stated by the dissenting members in the same Human Rights Committee report that “To rely on a prediction of dangerousness is tantamount to replacing presumption of innocence with guilt”. It is also important to note that in order to be released by the Parole Board, a prisoner must have completed a number of training and rehabilitation programmes. However, there is a shortage of these programs.

==== United Nations criticism ====
In at least two decisions, the UN Human Rights Committee found that specific aspects of the preventative detention scheme violated human rights.

In Rameka et al. v New Zealand the Human Rights Committee decided that an aspect of New Zealand's preventive detention scheme, violated article 9(4) of the International Covenant on Civil and Political Rights.

In April 2018, The UN Human Rights Committee found that New Zealand violated the rights of two men convicted of rape by keeping them in preventative detention without having provided them access to adequate rehabilitative programs in prison. While the committee did not rule categorically that preventative detention itself was a violation of human rights, they did write "The Committee considers that as the length of preventive detention increases, the State party bears an increasingly heavy burden to justify continued detention and to show that the threat posed by the individual cannot be addressed by alternative measures. As a result, a level of risk which might reasonably justify a short-term preventive detention, may not necessarily justify a longer period of preventive detention".

==== Law Commission review ====
In July 2022, the New Zealand Law Commission launched a review to examine the laws protecting the public from offenders who pose significant risks which will include inquiry into preventive detention as well as extended supervision orders and public protection orders. The Commission intends to report by the end of 2024.

=== OPCAT reports ===
In 2007 the New Zealand Government ratified the United Nations Optional Protocol to the Convention against Torture and Other Cruel, Inhuman or Degrading Treatment or Punishment (OPCAT). The objective of OPCAT is to establish a system of regular visits undertaken by an independent national body to places where people are deprived of their liberty, in order to prevent torture and other cruel, inhuman or degrading treatment or punishment. In New Zealand, the Office of the Omudsman performs inspections. The Ombudsman also has responsibility under the Crimes of Torture Act (COTA) for examining and monitoring the general conditions and treatment of detainees in New Zealand prisons. The Ombudsman has criticised the Department of Corrections in a recent series of reports and investigations, citing ongoing issues with privacy, young persons, prisoner meal times and segregation facilities. Site visits are viewed and promoted as initiating an ongoing dialogue with detaining agencies, rather than a one-off engagement.

With respect to prisons, the Office of the Ombudsman has addressed a wide range of issues arising in prisons including non-smoking policies, cell temperatures, double bunking and surrounding risk assessment procedures and provisions for prisoner privacy, lock-down hours and exercise facilities in prisons, and food quality and dining facilities in prison.

From 2011- 2013 the Ombudsman office directed their focus to segregations issues. Issues that the Office has reported on include: the level of consistency in segregation, conditions for segregated prisoners, the quality of segregation records, reintegration programs and minimum entitlements. In addition to the issue of segregation, the Office has examined issues associated with condensed meal times and the use (and recording and investigation) of force and restraint.

In 2015 the Human Rights Commission's annual report on places of detention raised significant rights concerns including privacy, segregation, mental health services and youth facilities.

In 2017, the Office of the Omudsman released two OPCAT reports by the Chief Ombudsman following unannounced inspections to Hawkes Bay prison and Spring Hill Corrections Facility under the Crimes of Torture Act 1989. The reports are the first to be released by the Ombudsman who has said further inspections will continue around the country with the findings to be made public. The reports identified multiple areas of concern.

==== Privacy concerns ====
Multiple reports have suggested privacy issues for prisoners. Areas of particular concern were segregated facilities, at risk units and external shower blocks. Cells used to segregate prisoners, referred to as management cells, separate cells, or punishment cells are used to describe a form of confinement where prisoners are held alone in a cell for up to 24 hours a day, and are only allowed to leave it for outdoor exercise generally for an hour's duration. At risk prisoners are normally separated due to mental health concerns. Prisoners can be placed in segregation facilities for various reasons including staff and prisoner security, punishment for misconduct and for isolation as a long-term strategy for managing challenging and disruptive behaviour. Both facilities are heavily monitored via cameras and guards routinely perform in-person visual checks in the cells as individuals in these facilities require extra monitoring. Concern has been raised over the privacy afforded to prisoners with inadequate privacy guards under such monitoring. Guards, of either sex, are able to see prisoners in various stages of undress, naked, showering or using toilets through cell doors and from cameras in the cells. The Chief Ombudsman has recommended that measures should be undertaken to better protect the privacy of prisoners when they are naked, partially naked, or undertaking their ablutions. The ombudsman also concluded that this lack of privacy amounts to degrading treatment or punishment for the purpose of the Convention Against Torture.

==== Fresh air ====
Concerns have been raised over whether prisoners are being afforded their basic rights to fresh air in accordance with article 21(1) of the United Nations Standard Minimum Rules for the Treatment of Prisoners. Providing access to fresh air was described as a challenge by Corrections staff, who could not provide assurance that prisoners were receiving their minimum entitlement. An hour of exercise, in the open air if the weather suits it, is a minimum legal entitlement and statutory right under sections 69(1)(a) and 70 of the Corrections Act. There is no provision under the Act for this to be derogated from.

==== Remand prisoners ====
In 2013, the United Nations Subcommittee for the Prevention of Torture visited several New Zealand prisons, and stated that limited time out of cell and the limited range and provision of constructive activities were issues for remand prisoners that should be addressed.

In 2017, the regime for remand accused prisoners remained an issue and was deemed unsatisfactory by the Chief Ombudsman, despite the recommendations made by the United Nations Subcommittee for the Prevention of Torture following its visit in 2013.

Additionally, the Chief Ombudsman has recommended that Remand accused prisoners should be managed separately from remand convicted and sentenced prisoners in line with Rule 11(b) of the United Nations Standard Minimum Rules for the Treatment of Prisoners (Mandela Rules)).

==== Youth prisoners ====
Following an Ombudsman inspection in 2017, recommendations were made that youth prisoners should not be housed in the Management Unit unless they are subject to a segregated directive. United Nations treaty bodies consistently recommend that juvenile offenders should not be subject to solitary confinement either as a disciplinary measure, or to separate them from the adult inmate population. Management cells were regularly used for non-segregated prisoners, including youth, when the muster was high.

The Ombudsman also reported on the mixing of remand and sentenced youth prisoners being housed in the same unit. Despite requests, inspectors were unable to view the necessary authorisations to allow different categories of youth to be mixed. This is contrary to the International Covenant on Civil and Political Rights, Article 10(2)(a), that Accused persons shall, except in exceptional circumstances, be kept separate from convicted persons and be treated in a manner appropriate to their status.

==== Meal times ====
Rule 22 of the United Nations Standard Minimum Rules for the Treatment of Prisoners (the Nelson Mandela Rules) states: "Every prisoner shall be provided by the prison administration at the usual hours with food of nutritional value adequate for health and strength, of wholesome quality and well prepared and served".

Meal times across New Zealand Prisons do not reflect standard meal times. In 2012, 2013, and 2014 the Ombudsmen reported that the 8 am to 5 pm unlock regime has condensed the working day for many prisoners, including meal times, with some dinners being routinely served as early as 3.30 pm, leaving prisoners without meals for lengthy periods. Lunch was served at 11.10 am in Christchurch Women's Prison and the evening meal being served as early as 3.15 pm at MECF during the 2014-2015 reporting period. At Hawkes Bay prison inspectors observed breakfast being issued in at 9.15 am, and lunch delivered to the units around 11am, issued to and eaten by prisoners before they were locked up by 11.45 am. The evening meal was delivered to the units as early as 2.55 pm and was issued and eaten on some units at 3.30 pm.

Corrections considers that the current meal times comply with section 72 of the Corrections Act 2004, which stipulates that every prisoner is provided with "a sufficient quantity of wholesome food and drink based on the food and nutritional guidelines for the time being issued by the Ministry of Health". There is no reference to the times food is served; rather, the focus is on quality and quantity.

The Chief Ombudsman reported that although the Corrections Act does not reference the time the food is served, the Nelson Mandela Rules require food to be served at the ‘usual’ time. The Ombudsman deemed it inappropriate for meals to be served at non-standard hours.

== Prisoners' mental health ==
Prisoners are up to five times more likely to be affected by mental health disorders and illnesses than the general public. The rate of prisoner suicide is 11 times higher than that of the general public. Section 75(1) of the Corrections Act 2004 provides that a prisoner is entitled to receive medical treatment that is reasonably necessary.

All male prisoners over the age of 18 years, on their arrival to prison, are screened for any mental health issues. If deemed in need of “mild or moderate” treatment they are then referred to the prison doctor or to a specialist provided by the District Health Board.

In 2010 the National Health Committee published a report looking into prisoners mental health. The prison environment was clearly identified as being a contributing factor for reasons including overcrowding, assaults, sexual abuse, illicit drugs, frequent strip searches and separation from family networks. In the same report, a number of key issues were identified; including detrimental environmental factors, poor identification and treatment of mental health issues and conflict over whose responsibility prisoners mental health is, given it is not a core function of the Department of Corrections.

Antonie Dixon exemplifies the failures identified above. In 2009, Mr Dixon committed suicide inside his at-risk cell. This was after several previous attempts inside the same prison. In his final moments, prison officers waited 7 minutes for other prison officers as back up, before entering the cell. It was held by Coroner Gary Evans that had Mr Dixon been correctly referred to mental health services, then he would still have been alive today.

=== Tie-down beds and restraints ===
In New Zealand, tie-down beds and restraints are not allowed in mental health facilities but may be used in detention facilities. In 2017 the Chief Ombudsman released a report "A Question of Restraint" that criticised the Department of Corrections for breaching the Convention against Torture, as well as the Corrections Act 2004. The report followed in-depth investigation into allegations of the use of tie-down beds and restraints. The report found incidents of at-risk prisoners being restrained on tie-down beds by their legs, arms, and chest over prolonged periods; and in waist restraints with their hands cuffed behind their backs.

The Chief Ombudsman's (OPCAT) inspectors found in one case at Auckland Prison, a prisoner was secured to a tie-down bed for 16 hours at a time, for 37 nights in a row. Judge Boshier says this prisoner spent 592 hours restrained on the tie-down bed, including in some cases being toileted on the bed. The prisoner's limbs were not moved during these prolonged periods of restraint.

In another case at Otago Corrections Facility, a prisoner was continuously kept in a waist restraint with his hands cuffed behind his back, after self-harming. The cuffs were used for 12 weeks prior to his release from prison, and were removed for two hours during the day, and every four hours at night. The prisoner was locked in his cell for 21 hours a day. Despite a recommendation that the prisoner be treated by an experienced psychologist, this did not occur during the 12 weeks he was restrained with handcuffs or prior to his release into the community.

Following the investigation, the Chief Ombudsman, Judge Boshier, concluded that the use of the tie-down bed and/or waist restraints in the circumstances of five prisoners amounted to cruel, inhuman, or degrading treatment or punishment for the purpose of Article 16 of the Convention against Torture.

== See also ==
- Howard League for Penal Reform Canterbury
