= Taylor v Attorney-General =

New Zealand High Court judgment

- Court: Auckland High Court
- Decided: 24 July 2015
- Citation: [2015] NZHC 1706
- Transcript: Available here

Case history
- Prior action: [2014] NZHC 1630

Court membership
- Judge sitting: Heath J

Keywords
- Prisoners' rights, Electoral law, New Zealand Bill of Rights Act 1990

Taylor v Attorney-General [2015] NZHC 1706 is a New Zealand High Court judgment which made a formal declaration that a statute that prohibited prisoners from voting is inconsistent with the New Zealand Bill of Rights Act 1990. The action was brought by Arthur Taylor, a high-profile prison inmate. This was the first time a court had recognised that a formal declaration of inconsistency is an available remedy for statutory breaches of the Bill of Rights. Section 5 of the Bill of Rights Act states, "Subject to section 4, the rights and freedoms contained in this Bill of Rights may be subject only to such reasonable limits prescribed by law as can be demonstrably justified in a free and democratic society." In his decision, Justice Heath declared that the Electoral (Disqualification of Sentenced Prisoners) Amendment Act 2010 which stripped all voting rights in general elections from prisoners was an unjustified limitation on the right to vote contained in s 12 of the Bill of Rights. The Court of Appeal upheld this decision after the Attorney-General appealed the jurisdiction of the courts to make declarations of inconsistency.

== Background ==
Justice Heath summarised the background to the legal challenge being, "As a result of an amendment made to the Electoral Act 1993 (the 1993 Act) in 2010, all prisoners incarcerated as a result of a sentence imposed after 16 December 2010 are barred from voting in a General Election." In response to disenfranchisement, five serving prisoners including career criminal Arthur Taylor "sought a formal declaration from this Court that the prohibition is inconsistent with s 12(a) of the Bill of Rights". Mr Taylor was not himself affected by the Amendment Act because he was serving a term exceeding three years’ imprisonment, and had therefore already lost his right to vote; however the other four applicants came within the ambit of the Act, and no question was raised about Taylor's standing. The Attorney-General in his 2010 report on the law, mandated by section 7 of the Bill of Rights Act requiring that any inconsistencies with a Bill of Rights right be brought to the attention of Parliament, had concluded, "the blanket disenfranchisement of prisoners appears to be inconsistent with s 12 of the Bill of Rights Act and that it cannot be justified under s 5 of that Act".

Prior to the review proceeding to a substantive hearing the Attorney-General had tried unsuccessfully to have the challenge struck out on the grounds courts had no jurisdiction over this matter and that any relief given "would breach the fundament principle of comity applying to the relationship between the judiciary and Parliament".

== Judgment ==
In his judgment Justice Heath adopted the reasons given by the Attorney-General in his s 7 report to Parliament on the Electoral (Disqualification of Sentenced Prisoners) Amendment Act's inconsistency with the Bill of Rights Act. Reasons given by the Attorney-General in his report included that "The objective of the Bill is not rationally linked to the blanket ban on prisoner voting. It is questionable that every person serving a sentence of imprisonment is necessarily a serious offender. People who are not serious offenders will be disenfranchised."

Justice Heath added that there was also an inconsistency with the right to vote in that the law created an arbitrary disparity between those sentenced to imprisonment and those to home detention;

Two co-offenders with equal culpability may receive different types of sentences to respond to the same offending. When one is sentenced to home detention and the other is imprisoned, that will often be because one does not have a suitable address at which home detention can be served. The consequence of the disparity in sentencing is that the offender who is sentenced to imprisonment loses his or her right to vote, whereas the home detainee does not. That is an arbitrary outcome.

— Heath J, Taylor v Attorney-General

As a result, Justice Heath made a declaration mirroring the declaration the Attorney-General had made in his s 7 report;

Section 80(1)(d) of the Electoral Act 1993 (as amended by the Electoral (Disqualification of Sentenced Prisoners) Amendment Act 2010) is inconsistent with the right to vote affirmed and guaranteed in s 12(a) of the New Zealand Bill of Rights Act 1990, and cannot be justified under s 5 of that Act.

In coming to his conclusion Justice Heath noted,

The inconsistency arises in the context of the most fundamental aspect of a democracy; namely, the right of all citizens to elect those who will govern on their behalf. Looking at the point solely as one of discretion, if a declaration were not made in this case, it is difficult to conceive of one in which it would. Enactment of a statutory provision that is inconsistent with that fundamental right should be marked by a formal declaration of the High Court, rather than by an observation buried in its reasons for judgment.

— Heath J, Taylor v Attorney-General

This statement acted as a response to the Attorney-General's argument that the Court's jurisdiction was limited to indications of inconsistency as seen in Hansen. In that case McGrath J stated that “a New Zealand Court must never shirk its responsibility to indicate, in any case where it concludes that the measure being considered is inconsistent with protected rights, that it has inquired into the possibility of there being an available rights-consistent interpretation [and] that none could be found”. Heath J held that this precedent for indications did not preclude a formal declaration being made when appropriate.

== Appeal and updates ==
The Attorney-General appealed Heath J's decision, and the case was reconsidered by the Court of Appeal in May 2017. The central issue on appeal was whether the High Court should have made a declaration of inconsistency. The Court of Appeal reviewed both the jurisdiction of the courts to make such a declaration and its suitability in the circumstances, and affirmed the decision of the High Court. Furthermore, the Speaker of the House of Representatives challenged the use of parliamentary proceedings in the High Court decision, arguing that this was a breach of parliamentary privilege. The Court concluded that no such breach had occurred.

Attorney-General v Taylor [2018] NZSC 104: The Supreme Court dismissed the Attorney-General's appeal and upheld the lower courts' decisions that the judiciary has the power to issue declarations of inconsistency under the New Zealand Bill of Rights Act 1990 (NZBORA).

Attorney-General v Taylor developments in 2020:

1. In March 2020, the New Zealand Bill of Rights (Declarations of Inconsistency) Amendment Bill was introduced to Parliament. This bill aims to create a formal process for Parliament to consider declarations of inconsistency made by courts, like the one in the Taylor case. The bill requires the Attorney-General to report a declaration of inconsistency to the House of Representatives within six sitting days of the declaration becoming final. It allows Parliament to review the declaration if it chooses to do so through the adoption or amendment of Standing Orders.

=== Jurisdiction for declarations ===
The Attorney-General argued that a declaration was not within the jurisdiction of the courts because it had not been expressly authorised by Parliament. He contended that the Declaratory Judgments Act 1908 had sufficiently covered the area, and that this effectively ruled out such a remedy at common law. The Court disagreed: it stated that the Declaratory Judgments Act did not exclude jurisdiction of the courts, and went on to establish multiple sources conferring jurisdiction.

The first source of jurisdiction considered by the Court was the Bill of Rights Act itself. The Bill of Rights does not expressly grant the power to make declarations, nor does it exclude such a power. The Attorney-General accepted that sections 2–6 of the Bill allow the courts to identify inconsistencies between protected rights and other statutes, but said that this is limited to simply making indications of incompatibility, not formal declarations. The Court did not accept this jurisdictional limit. It held that the Bill of Rights intended the courts to point out unjustified limitations on rights, and that to exclude declarations would be contrary to both this purpose and to New Zealand's obligations under the International Covenant on Civil and Political Rights. Furthermore, a declaration would provide a domestic remedy prior to any available internationally. The Court cited Baigent’s Case in stating that it would make no sense for Parliament to contemplate that New Zealand citizens could seek redress from the United Nations Human Rights Committee, but not from their own courts.

Next the Court turned to a number of cases that suggested the jurisdiction to make declarations should exist. Temese showed acceptance of such a possibility as early as 1992, supported by Baigent’s Case two years later. In Quilter v Attorney-General, the Court held that the Marriage Act 1955 was an unjustified limitation on the right to freedom from discrimination of same sex couples. The Court in Quilter stated: "… once Parliament has charged the Courts with the task of giving meaning and effect to the fundamental rights and freedoms affirmed in the Bill of Rights, it would be a serious error not to proclaim a violation if and when a violation is found to exist in the law." The Court of Appeal in Attorney-General v Taylor saw this as further acknowledgment of the jurisdiction to make a declaration. Subsequently, Zaoui v Attorney-General included an argument by the Crown that the Court did not have the jurisdiction to make a declaration of inconsistency, and although the High Court did not consider such a declaration appropriate in the circumstances, it acknowledged that the jurisdiction to do so clearly existed. Finally, the most recent case Hansen v R observed that: "a major purpose of a Bill of Rights (entrenched or otherwise) is to prevent minority interests from being overridden by an oppressive or overzealous majority." These precedents were taken by the Court of Appeal as convincing support for the jurisdiction of declarations of inconsistency.

Finally, the Court of Appeal supported the finding of Heath J that section 92J of the Human Rights Act 1993 shows a Parliamentary acceptance of a court's jurisdiction to make declarations of inconsistency. This section gives the Human Rights Review Tribunal the power to declare that an enactment is inconsistent with section 19 of the Bill of Rights, which protects the right to freedom from discrimination. In Taylor v Attorney-General, Heath J stated that it would be difficult to comprehend that Parliament would confer this declaratory power on the Tribunal but not on a more senior court. This is reinforced by the fact that the statute also allows a right of appeal from the Tribunal to the High Court about such declarations. The Court of Appeal agreed with this reasoning.

=== When a declaration should be made ===
Having determined that declarations of inconsistency are within the jurisdiction of the High Court, the Court of Appeal went on to consider when such declarations should be made. It stated that the remedy is one of discretion, and is not available as of right. In most cases an indication of incompatibility would suffice, rather than a formal declaration. However the Court accepted that there would certainly be times when a declaration should be used:

A court will consider a DoI only where it is satisfied that the enactment impinges further on a protected right than can be justified in a free and democratic society, and such a conclusion can be reached only after evaluating the policy underlying the enactment and assessing any invitation to defer to another branch of government.

— Wild and Milling JJ, Attorney-General v Taylor

The Court held that in the case before them, a declaration was the appropriate remedy. The reasons for this were: the right to vote is an essential element of a free and democratic society; the limitation on this right was not justified; the legislature was aware of the inconsistency at the time of enactment; and there were no overseas developments that may cause Parliament to reconsider the Act independently. The Court of Appeal did state that Mr Taylor should not have been granted a declaration by himself because the Act in question did not affect him, but as the declaration was made in a single proceeding with joint plaintiffs who were affected, it was correct of the High Court to do so.

=== Parliamentary privilege ===
The Speaker of the House of Representatives raised a second challenge to the High Court's declaration by arguing that the High Court had breached parliamentary privilege. In coming to his decision, Heath J had examined the section 7 report before reaching the same conclusion, and the Speaker was concerned that he had effectively reviewed a parliamentary proceeding in doing so. This could be a breach of parliamentary privilege if the Court had questioned Parliament's treatment of the issues. However the Court of Appeal held that Heath J had not done so; he had merely described the parliamentary processes and noted the report's existence before coming to his own conclusion about the same subject matter. This was an acceptable purpose for using such material. The Court also noted that the same situation had occurred in Hansen v R by members of the Supreme Court. Therefore, this second challenge was also dispensed with, as parliamentary privilege had not been breached by the declaration.

== Significance ==
This was the first time a court in New Zealand had recognised that a formal declaration of inconsistency is an available remedy for statutory breaches of the Bill of Rights. Arthur Taylor, in a recorded statement to Radio New Zealand after the verdict said, "His Honour Justice Heath's very courageous decision strikes a strong blow for the rule of law, not only for prisoners, but all other New Zealanders, in upholding their fundamental rights against even the Parliament". A declaration of inconsistency acts as a powerful vindication for those who have no other way of receiving remedy for breaches of their rights.

The other significant outcome of the decision that declarations of inconsistency are within the jurisdiction of the courts is that it acts as a powerful check on parliamentary sovereignty. In New Zealand Parliament is supreme, but this power of the courts to declare laws to be inconsistent places a burden on this supremacy, by requiring that Parliament uphold the fundamental rights of its citizens. It affirms the courts as “upholders of rights, standing between ordinary citizens and the might of Parliament.”

The extent of the significance of this case will depend on whether Parliament remedies the Act in question. A declaration of inconsistency does not invalidate the law, or force Parliament to change the offending statute accordingly. Taylor merely expresses that the courts have a “reasonable expectation that other branches of government, respecting the judicial function, will respond by reappraising the legislation and making any changes that are thought appropriate.” If Parliament chooses to enact a rights-consistent version of the Electoral (Disqualification of Sentenced Prisoners) Amendment Act then Taylor could mark the beginning of a major constitutional development in New Zealand.

== See also ==
- New Zealand Bill of Rights Act 1990
- Voting rights of prisoners in New Zealand
