= Bills reported as inconsistent with the New Zealand Bill of Rights Act 1990 =

The New Zealand Bill of Rights Act 1990 (NZBORA) requires that the attorney-general report to the New Zealand Parliament on any bills that contain provisions that appear to be inconsistent with the Bill of Rights Act.

Parliament is not constrained by the Bill of Rights Act and is free to ignore an attorney-general's report and enact any legislation it sees fit. In fact, the attorney-general, who prepares the reports, is a Government minister and is bound by Cabinet collective responsibility to support the passage of all Government bills through the House of Representatives.

== Criminal Procedure (Reform and Modernisation) Bill ==
The Criminal Procedure (Reform and Modernisation) Bill is a Government bill introduced by Simon Power as minister of justice on 15 November 2010. Public submissions on the bill closed on 18 February 2011 and the Justice and Electoral Select Committee was due to report back by 14 July 2011.

Attorney-General Chris Finlayson prepared two reports outlining conflicts between this bill and the Bill of Rights. The main report addressed the majority of the bill and an additional report dealt specifically with a proposed amendment to the Bill of Rights Act.

=== Conflict with right to a jury trial ===
In New Zealand, offences are classified by the length of the maximum sentence. Offences punishable by less than three months in prison are not required to have a jury trial, but offences punishable by more than three months in prison have the right to a jury trial. This right is enshrined in section 24(e) of the Bill of Rights.

The Criminal Procedure (Reform and Modernisation) Bill proposes to raise the threshold for access to a jury trial from offences with a maximum sentence of three months in prison to offences with a maximum sentence of three years in prison.

The bill includes a provision to amend the Bill of Rights Act to remove the right to a jury trial for this expanded class of offences. This conflict with the Bill of Rights Act is outlined in the Attorney-General's supplemental report on the bill.

=== Conflict with right to be present during a trial ===
Attorney-General's report identifies the following breaches of the right to be present during a trial:

- If the defendant has a "reasonable excuse" for not attending and the prosecutor is ready to proceed, the trial may proceed without them.
- If the defendant does not have a reasonable excuse, the trial must proceed without them.
- The defendant may be removed from a trial if they cause enough of an interruption that it is "impractical to continue".

The report also highlights a further provision of the bill that involves hearings for offences that do not carry a prison term. In this situation the bill gives judges the discretion to continue the hearing if the defendant does not turn up. In his report, the Attorney-General, Chris Finlayson defends this provision by asserting that judges will exercise this discretion "in a manner that does not limit section 25(e) of the Bill of Rights Act".

=== Conflict with the right to not be retried for the same offence ===
According to the report, the bill contains two provisions that are in conflict with the double jeopardy rule (section 26(2) of the Bill of Rights Act):

- If the offence has a penalty of 14 years imprisonment and the Court of Appeal finds that there is new and compelling evidence of their guilt, the court can order a new trial.
- If the person is acquitted of an offence punishable by imprisonment and later convicted of corrupting their trial they can be retried.

=== Conflict with the right to be presumed innocent until proven guilty ===
The report identifies two places where the onus of proof is reversed by the bill:

- The bill makes an amendment to the Fisheries Act 1996. It relates to people on New Zealand vessels fishing in foreign jurisdictions and requires that they prove that they transported fish "in accordance with the laws of that jurisdiction".
- The bill requires pilots who disobey foreign air traffic controllers to prove that the safety of people on the aircraft would have been endangered if they complied.

=== Provisions said to be justified ===
==== Defendants required to identify issues at trial ====
Under the bill, defendants are to be required to identify issues they intend to rely on in their case, e.g. the points in their charge that are in dispute and whether they propose to rely on expert evidence. Failure to do so could be interpreted as an indication of guilt.

Finlayson notes that this a "novel step" in New Zealand and identifies a tension between this provision several rights enshrined in the Bill of Right's act: the right to silence, the right to a presumption of innocence, the right not to be compelled to give evidence or incriminate oneself and the right to a fair trial.

Finlayson concludes that there are sufficient safeguards in place for this provision of the bill to be justified under the Bill of Rights.

== Other reports since 2005 ==
Bill Name	Date of report	BORA inconsistencies	Refs
Affordable Healthcare Bill	16 September 2015	19 – Freedom from discrimination (family status, national origins)	
Alcohol Reform Bill	8 November 2010	14 – Freedom of expression 19 – Freedom from discrimination (family status); 22 – Freedom from arbitrary arrest or detention 25c – Presumption of innocence 27 – Right to justice	
Auckland Regional Amenities Funding Bill	19 September 2007	19 – Freedom from discrimination (disability)	
Child Protection (Child Sex Offender Register) Bill	13 August 2015	9 – Right not to be subjected to torture or cruel treatment 26(2) – Double jeopardy	
Criminal Investigations (Bodily Samples) Amendment Bill	10 February 2009	21 – Unreasonable search and seizure	
Eden Park Trust Amendment Bill	8 April 2009	19 – Freedom from discrimination (disability)	
Electoral (Disqualification of Convicted Prisoners) Amendment Bill	17 March 2010	12 – Electoral rights	
Electronic Monitoring of Offenders Legislation Bill	13 May 2015	18(1) – Freedom of movement 21 – Unreasonable search and seizure 26(2) – Double jeopardy	
Financial Assistance for Live Organ Donors Bill	21 July 2015	19 – Freedom from discrimination (employment status)	
Head of State Referenda Bill	21 April 2010	19 – Freedom from discrimination (age)	
Human Rights (One Law for All) Amendment Bill	28 June 2006	19 – Freedom from discrimination (colour, race, ethnic or national origin); 20 – Rights of minorities	
Human Tissue (Organ Donation) Amendment Bill	29 March 2006	19 – Freedom from discrimination (age, disability)	
Land Transport Amendment Bill	19 November 2013	25c – Presumption of innocence	
Land Transport (Admissibility of Evidential Breath Tests) Amendment Bill	17 October 2012	25c – Presumption of innocence	
Liquor Advertising (Television and Radio) Bill	2 July 2009	14 – Freedom of expression	
Lobbying Disclosure Bill	12 June 2012	14 – Freedom of expression	
Local Electoral (Māori Representation) Amendment Bill	16 June 2010	19 – Freedom from discrimination (race)	
Manukau City Council (Control of Graffiti) Bill	7 December 2005	19 – Freedom from discrimination (age); 23(4) – Right to refrain from making a statement	
Manukau City Council (Control of Street Prostitution) Bill	7 December 2005	23(4) – Right to refrain from making a statement	
Marriage (Gender Clarification) Amendment Bill	11 May 2005	19 – Freedom from discrimination (marital status, sexual orientation)	
Misuse of Drugs Amendment Bill	23 April 2010	25c – Presumption of innocence	
Misuse of Drugs (Classification of BZP) Amendment Bill	22 August 2007	25c – Presumption of innocence	
New Zealand Public Health and Disability Amendment Bill (No 2)	16 May 2013	27(2) – Right to a judicial review of a determination	
New Zealand Superannuation and Retirement Income (Pro Rata Entitlement) Amendment Bill	21 July 2015	19 – Freedom from discrimination (national origin, age); 18(3) – Right to leave New Zealand	
Parole (Extended Supervision Orders) Amendment Bill	2 April 2009	22 – Freedom from arbitrary arrest or detention 26 – Retroactive penalties and double jeopardy	
Parole (Extended Supervision Orders) Amendment Bill	17 April 2014	26 – Retroactive penalties and double jeopardy	
Prisoners' and Victims' Claims (Redirecting Prisoner Compensation) Amendment Bill	13 October 2011		
Sentencing and Parole Reform Bill	18 February 2009	9 – Right not to be subjected to torture or cruel treatment	
Smoke-free Environments (Removing Tobacco Displays) Amendment Bill	22 September 2010	14 – Freedom of expression	
Social Assistance (Future Focus) Bill	24 March 2010	19 – Freedom from discrimination (sex, marital status, family status)	
Taxation (Income-sharing Tax Credit) Bill	16 August 2010	19 – Freedom from discrimination (marital status, sex)	
Wanganui District Council (Prohibition of Gang Insignia) Bill	20 February 2008	14 – Freedom of expression	
