= Declaration of inconsistency =

New Zealand constitutional remedy

A declaration of inconsistency in New Zealand constitutional law is a declaration by a senior court that an act of parliament is inconsistent with the New Zealand Bill of Rights Act 1990 (NZBORA) in a way that has not been justified in a free and democratic society. It was first made available as a legal remedy following the litigation in Taylor v Attorney-General, where the High Court declared that the prohibition of all prisoners from voting was inconsistent with the NZBORA.

== Overview ==
=== New Zealand Bill of Rights Act 1990 ===
The New Zealand Bill of Rights Act 1990 guarantees a set of fundamental rights and freedoms of anyone subject to New Zealand law. However, NZBORA allows for "justified limitations" on the rights and freedoms it guarantees. It says that the rights within NZBORA are subject to "reasonable limits prescribed by law [that] can be demonstrably justified in a free and democratic society".

=== Development of case law ===
The first suggestion that a declaration of inconsistency could be available was in 1992. Following this, Temese v Police and Quilter v Attorney-General both suggested that it could be available in the appropriate case, but fell short of making a declaration. In Moonen v Film and Literature Board of Review, Justice Andrew Tipping stated that the courts had a duty to indicate when legislation was inconsistent with the New Zealand Bill of Rights Act 1990, but it was unclear whether he meant a formal declaration of inconsistency or a mere indication of inconsistency contained within the judgment.

In R v Poumako, it was determined to be inappropriate to make a formal declaration of inconsistency, however Justice Ted Thomas dissented stating that it was appropriate. It followed in Zaoui v Attorney-General that the Court of Appeal held that Moonen and Poumako had established a jurisdiction for courts to issue a formal declaration of inconsistency. However, in R v Hansen, while the Court of Appeal established that courts could inquire into the consistency of legislation with the New Zealand Bill of Rights Act 1990, the Supreme Court did not make a formal declaration of inconsistency.

=== Taylor v Attorney-General ===
In July 2015, Justice Heath at the High Court of Auckland in Taylor v Attorney-General issued a formal declaration of inconsistency that an electoral law amendment introduced by the Fifth National Government that removed the ability of inmates voting rights in the Electoral Act 1993, was an unjustified limitation under section 12(a) of the New Zealand Bill of Rights Act 1990, which prescribes voting rights to all citizens aged 18 years and over. This was the first declaration of inconsistency in New Zealand.

This was appealed to the Court of Appeal by the Attorney-General who argued that the court had no jurisdiction to issue a declaration of inconsistency unless it was expressly authorised by legislation, the Court of Appeal called this a "bold argument" and said that "inconsistency between statutes is a question of interpretation...and it lies within the province of the courts." Furthermore Speaker of the House David Carter in the case challenged the use of parliamentary proceedings in the High Court decision and argued that this was a breach of parliamentary privilege. In its ruling, concluded that no breach of parliamentary privilege occurred and that senior courts had the jurisdiction to make a declaration of inconsistency. This was then further appealed by the Attorney-General to the Supreme Court which dismissed the appeal and upheld the judgment by the Court of Appeal.

=== New Zealand Bill of Rights (Declarations of Inconsistency) Amendment Act 2022 ===
On 29 August 2022, the New Zealand Bill of Rights (Declarations of Inconsistency) Amendment Act 2022 received Royal assent and commenced on the same day. The amendment act introduced a legal requirement for the Attorney-General to notify parliament when a declaration of inconsistency is made, and further that the responsible Minister must present a report to parliament that details the government's response to the declaration.

=== Make It 16 Incorporated v Attorney-General ===
On 21 November 2022, the Supreme Court issued a declaration of inconsistency in the Electoral Act 1993 and Local Electoral Act 2001 after ruling that the voting age of 18 was unjustified age discrimination under the NZBORA. In the case, the court also affirmed the jurisdiction confirmed by the court in Taylor v Attorney-General and noted the passing of the New Zealand Bill of Rights (Declarations of Inconsistency) Amendment Act 2022.
