= Make It 16 (New Zealand) =

New Zealand campaign for lowering the voting age

- Make It 16 Incorporated
- Formation: September 20, 2019; 7 years ago
- Founded: 2019
- Type: Campaign
- Location: New Zealand
- Website: www.makeit16.org.nz

Make It 16 is a campaign group led by youth in New Zealand that campaigns for the lowering the voting age in general and local elections to 16.

== History ==
Make It 16 was formed out of the New Zealand Youth Parliament in September 2019 to campaign for suffrage to be granted to 16- and 17-year-olds. When the campaign launched, its co-director Gina Dao-McLay said that "politicians were blocking the voices of 16 and 17-year-olds even though they could work fulltime, consent to sex, drive a car and own guns". Andrew Becroft, then Children's Commissioner, expressed his support for the campaign alongside several members of Parliament, notably the Green MP Chlöe Swarbrick.

In December 2022, the Hutt City, Kāpiti Coast District and Porirua City councils voted to endorse the Make It 16 campaign and to extend voting rights for local elections to 16- and 17-year-olds, joining the Wellington City Council who supported the move to lower the voting age in 2021. According to Stuff, "seventy-three elected councillors and mayors from councils across the country have signed a letter in support of Make It 16."

On 16 January 2024, the Independent Election Review released its two-year investigation of the country's electoral system. Their report recommended lowering the voting age from 18 to 16 years. In response, Justice Minister Goldsmith stated that the National-led coalition government would not be lowering the voting age.

Make It 16 has coincided with advocacy efforts inside Youth Parliament to over the voting age. Upon the 11th Youth Parliament in 2025, 63 Youth MPs, as well as several past Youth MPs and several advocacy organizations, signed an open letter to the Ministry of Youth of Development to ask for lowering the voting age to 16. According to the campaign, this has been the third time Youth Parliament was used as a medium to call for lowering the voting age.

=== Legal action ===
In late 2019, Make It 16 filed legal action with the High Court of New Zealand arguing that the voting age of 18 was unjustified age discrimination under the New Zealand Bill of Rights Act 1990 and asked the court to issue a declaration of inconsistency. However, in 2020, High Court ruled that while the voting age was age discrimination, it was a justified limitation.

Make It 16 appealled the decision by the High Court, and on 14 December 2020, the Court of Appeal of New Zealand ruled that the voting age of 18 was unjustified age discrimination, but refused to issue a declaration of inconsistency due to it being an issue already in the public arena and an intensely political issue. When speaking to Radio New Zealand, Thomas Pope-Kerr from Make It 16 noted their frustration on not getting the declaration from the Court of Appeal, but said that the group was taking the court's ruling as a win and would likely be appealing to the Supreme Court to seek a declaration of inconsistency.

On 21 November 2022, the Supreme Court of New Zealand issued its judgment, ruling that the voting age of 18 was unjustified age discrimination. The Supreme Court also issued a declaration of inconsistency in the Electoral Act 1993, which sets out the voting age in the general elections, and for the Local Electoral Act 2001 for local elections.

=== Legislation ===
Following the Make It 16 Supreme Court ruling, Prime Minister Jacinda Ardern expressed support for lowering the voting age to 16 years. She announced that the Labour government would introduce legislation lowering the voting age to 16 years. In contrast, the opposition National Party justice spokesperson Paul Goldsmith stated that his party would not be supporting lowering the voting age on the grounds that it regarded the current voting age of 18 years as appropriate.

On 13 March 2023, Prime Minister Chris Hipkins scrapped plans for legislation to lower the voting age in general elections, stating his plan to focus on lowering the voting age in local elections instead.

In mid-August 2023, the Labour Government introduced the Electoral (Lowering Voting Age for Local Elections and Polls) Legislation Bill to lower the voting age to 16 years for local elections. The proposed legislation was supported by Te Pāti Māori candidate Hana-Rawhiti Maipi-Clarke, Make It 16 co-director Thomas Brocherie, and Young Greens equity officer Johnny Bentley-Cribb The bill passed its first reading on 29 August during the last sitting week of the 53rd New Zealand Parliament prior to its dissolution before the 2023 New Zealand general election. The bill was subsequently referred to parliament's justice select committee on 7 September 2023.

Following the 2023 general election, on 26 January 2024, Local Government Minister Simeon Brown confirmed that the newly-elected National-led coalition government would halt plans to progress the previous government's bill to lower the voting age for local council elections to 16 years.

== Public opinion on the voting age ==
In early October 2020, a 1News Colmar Brunton poll found that 13% of respondents supported lowering the voting age to 16 years while 85% opposed the motion. Segments most supportive of lowering the voting age were Green Party supporters and those in their 30s while segments most opposed to lowering the voting age were those aged over 70 years, National Party supporters, and Aucklanders.

In late October 2022, the Taxpayers' Union and Auckland Ratepayers' Alliance released the results of a Curia Market Research poll of 1,000 eligible voters (over the age of 18), which found 74% of respondents opposed to lowering the voting age and 23% in favour.

On 1 December 2022, The New Zealand Herald released the results of its own exclusive poll which found that 21% of respondents supported lowering the voting age to 16 years, whilst 79% opposed it. Polling reveals that support for lowering the voting age is the highest at 31% in 18–24-year-olds, with support decreasing in older age brackets up to 55–64-year-olds with only 12% supportive.
