= New Zealand Parliament =

Supreme unicameral legislature of New Zealand

New Zealand Parliament Pāremata Aotearoa
- 54th Parliament (dissolved)

Type
- Type: Unicameral (since 1951); bicameral (1854–1950)
- Houses: House of Representatives (extant); Legislative Council (abolished)
- Sovereign: Monarch of New Zealand

History
- Founded: 24 May 1854 (first sitting)
- Preceded by: General Legislative Council

Leadership
- Monarch: Charles III since 8 September 2022
- Governor-General: Dame Cindy Kiro since 21 October 2021
- Speaker: Gerry Brownlee since 5 December 2023
- Prime Minister: Christopher Luxon since 27 November 2023
- Leader of the Opposition: Chris Hipkins since 27 November 2023

Meeting place
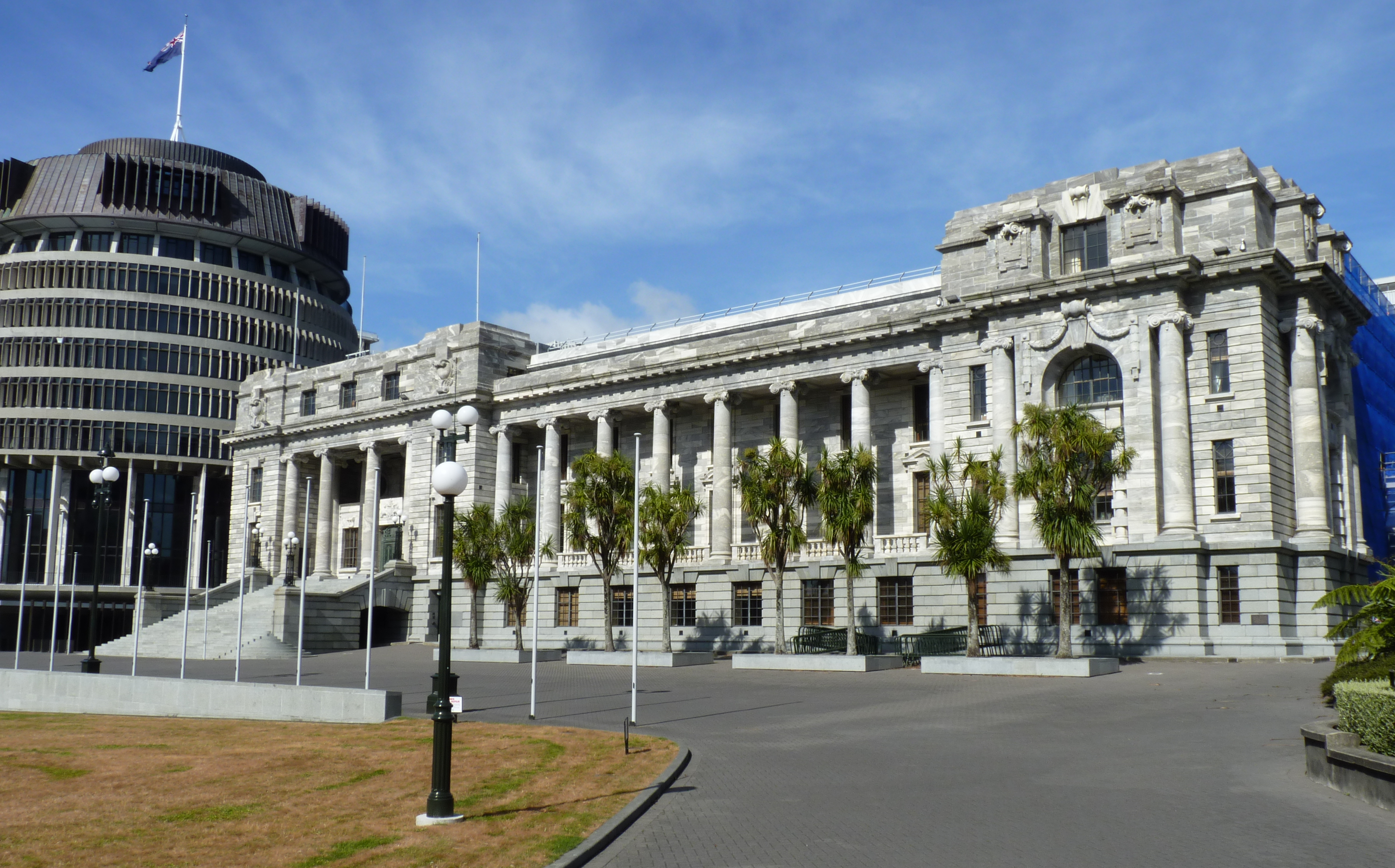
- Parliament House, Wellington

Website
- www.parliament.nz

The New Zealand Parliament (Māori: Pāremata Aotearoa) is the unicameral legislature of New Zealand, consisting of the monarch (represented by the governor-general) and the New Zealand House of Representatives. It was established in 1854 and is one of the oldest continuously functioning legislatures in the world. It was bicameral until the abolition of the New Zealand Legislative Council at the end of 1950. Parliament's seat, the capital of New Zealand, has been Wellington since 1865. It has met in its current building, Parliament House, since 1922.

The House of Representatives normally consists of 120 members of Parliament (MPs), though sometimes more due to overhang seats. There are 72 MPs elected directly in electorates while the remainder of seats are assigned to list MPs based on each party's share of the total party vote. Māori were represented in Parliament from 1867, and in 1893 women gained the vote. Although elections can be called early, every three years Parliament is dissolved and goes up for reelection.

Parliament is supreme over all other government institutions. The legislature is closely linked to the executive. The New Zealand Government comprises a prime minister (head of government) and other ministers; in accordance with the principle of responsible government, they are always selected from and accountable to the House of Representatives.

Neither the monarch (currently King Charles III) nor his governor-general participates in the legislative process, save for signifying the King's approval to a bill passed by the House, known as the granting of the royal assent, which is necessary for a bill to be enacted as law. The governor-general formally summons and dissolves Parliament—the latter in order to call a general election.

== Terminology ==
In New Zealand the term 'parliament' is used in several different senses. Strictly, it refers to the legislature, consisting of the monarch (represented by the governor-general) and the House of Representatives, the topic of this article. Secondly, it is often used to refer to just the House of Representatives. Thirdly, it can mean each assembly of MPs voted into office by a general election; in this sense, the 1st Parliament sat from 24 May 1854 to 15 September 1855, and the current Parliament, which started on 5 December 2023, is the 54th. Lastly, 'Parliament' may refer to a physical place: most specifically the debating chamber where MPs normally meet, also the whole Parliament House (in which the chamber is situated), and more generally this and the several other Parliament Buildings.

== History ==
=== Background ===
The New Zealand Parliament is modelled on the Westminster system of parliamentary representation, developed in the United Kingdom of Great Britain and Ireland. This system can be traced back to the "Model Parliament" of 1295. Over the centuries, parliaments progressively limited the powers of the monarchy, resulting in what came to be known as constitutional monarchy. The Bill of Rights 1688 (which remains in force as received law in New Zealand) established a system where parliaments would be regularly elected. Among its provisions, it set out parliament's role in taxation and supply. The Bill of Rights also confirmed the absolute privilege for freedom of speech in parliament.

The British Government issued the Charter for Erecting the Colony of New Zealand on 16 November 1840. This established the Colony of New Zealand as a Crown colony separate from New South Wales on 3 May 1841. The charter created a Legislative Council, which consisted of the governor of New Zealand, the colonial secretary and colonial treasurer (who comprised the Executive Council), and three justices of the peace appointed by the governor. It had the power to issue ordinances (statutory instruments). However, Crown colonies were not self-governing. Many British settlers did not like the Legislative Council, and from the 1840s they wanted self-government.

The British Parliament passed the New Zealand Constitution Act 1846, which was intended to establish a General Assembly for the colony, consisting of a Governor-in-Chief, a House of Representatives and a Legislative Council. However, the new governor, George Grey, argued that the settlers could not be trusted to pass laws that would protect the interests of the Māori majority. Consequently the British Parliament passed the Government of New Zealand Act 1848, which suspended the establishment of the General Assembly for another five years.

=== Establishment ===
The New Zealand parliament was created by the New Zealand Constitution Act 1852, an act of the British Parliament. The act established the General Assembly, later commonly known as Parliament, a bicameral legislature consisting of the governor of New Zealand, the House of Representatives (the lower house), and the Legislative Council (the upper house). The Council was formed by reconstituting the older Legislative Council. The members of the House were elected under the first-past-the-post (FPP) voting system, while those of the Council were appointed by the governor. The first members were sworn in on 24 May 1854 in Auckland.

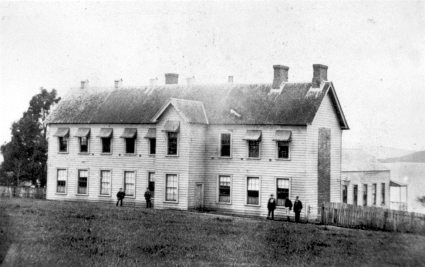
General Assembly House in Auckland, 1861

The Constitution Act also conferred legislative power on New Zealand's provinces (originally six in number), each of which had its own elected provincial council. The councils were able to legislate for their provinces on most subjects. New Zealand was never a federation comparable to Canada or Australia; Parliament could legislate concurrently with the provinces on any matter, and in the event of a conflict, the law passed by Parliament would prevail. Over a twenty-year period, political power was progressively centralised and the provinces were abolished in 1876.

=== Legislative Council abolished ===
Initially, members of the Legislative Council were appointed for life, but from the 1890s they were appointed for renewable seven-year terms. This change, coupled with responsible government (whereby the premier advised the governor on Council appointments) and party politics, meant that by the 20th century, the government usually controlled the Council as well as the House, and the passage of bills through the upper house became a mere formality. The Legislative Council Abolition Act 1950 brought the Council to an end, effective on 1 January 1951, making the New Zealand legislature unicameral. At the end the Council had fifty-four members, including its speaker. It sat for the last time on 1 December 1950.

=== Modern independent legislature ===
The New Zealand Parliament was originally subordinate to the British Parliament, the supreme legislative authority for the entire British Empire, although, in practice, Britain's role was minimal from the 1890s. The New Zealand Parliament received progressively more control over New Zealand affairs through the passage of Imperial (British) laws such as the Colonial Laws Validity Act 1865, constitutional amendments, and an increasingly hands-off approach by the British government. In 1947, the New Zealand Parliament passed the Statute of Westminster Adoption Act, and the British Parliament passed the New Zealand Constitution Amendment Act 1947, giving the New Zealand Parliament legislative sovereignty – unrestricted power to make New Zealand's laws – and the ability to regulate its own composition. In 1973 a further amendment, the New Zealand Constitution Amendment Act 1973, expanded the territorial jurisdiction of New Zealand's parliament.

The Constitution Act 1986 finally removed the power of the British Parliament to pass laws affecting New Zealand (which was by then only with New Zealand's consent), restating the few remaining provisions of the 1852 Act, consolidating the legislation establishing Parliament. It also officially replaced the name "General Assembly" with "Parliament", which was already the term popularly used.

=== Proposals for a Senate ===
In September 1950, the National government of Sidney Holland set up a constitutional reform committee chaired by Ronald Algie to consider an alternative second chamber. A report produced by the committee in 1952 proposed a nominated Senate, with 32 members, appointed by leaders of the parties in the House of Representatives according to the parties' strength in that House. Senators would serve for three-year terms, and be eligible for reappointment. The senate would have the power to revise, initiate or delay legislation, to hear petitions, and to scrutinise regulations and Orders in Council, but the proposal was rejected by the prime minister and by the Labour opposition, which had refused to nominate members to the committee.

After the 1990 election, the National government of Jim Bolger proposed the establishment of an elected Senate, thereby reinstating a bicameral system, and a Senate Bill was drafted. Under the bill, the senate would have 30 members, elected by STV from six senatorial districts, four in the North Island and two in the South Island. Like the former Legislative Council it would not have powers to amend or delay money bills. The intention was to include a question about a Senate in the second referendum on electoral reform. Voters would be asked whether or not they wanted a Senate, in the event that a new voting system was rejected. However, following objections from the Labour opposition, which derided it as a red herring, and other supporters of the mixed-member proportional representation system, the Senate question was removed by the Select Committee on Electoral Reform.

In 2010, the New Zealand Policy Unit of the Centre for Independent Studies proposed a Senate in the context of the 2011 referendum on MMP. They proposed a proportionally-elected upper house made up 31 seats elected using a proportional list vote by region, with the House of Representatives elected by FPP and consisting of 79 seats.

== Composition ==
The New Zealand parliament, when created in 1852, consisted of the governor of New Zealand, the Legislative Council, and the House of Representatives. The Legislative Council was abolished at the end of 1950. The New Zealand Parliament now statutorily consists of the monarch of New Zealand, who is represented by the governor-general of New Zealand, and the House of Representatives.

=== Monarch and viceregal representative ===
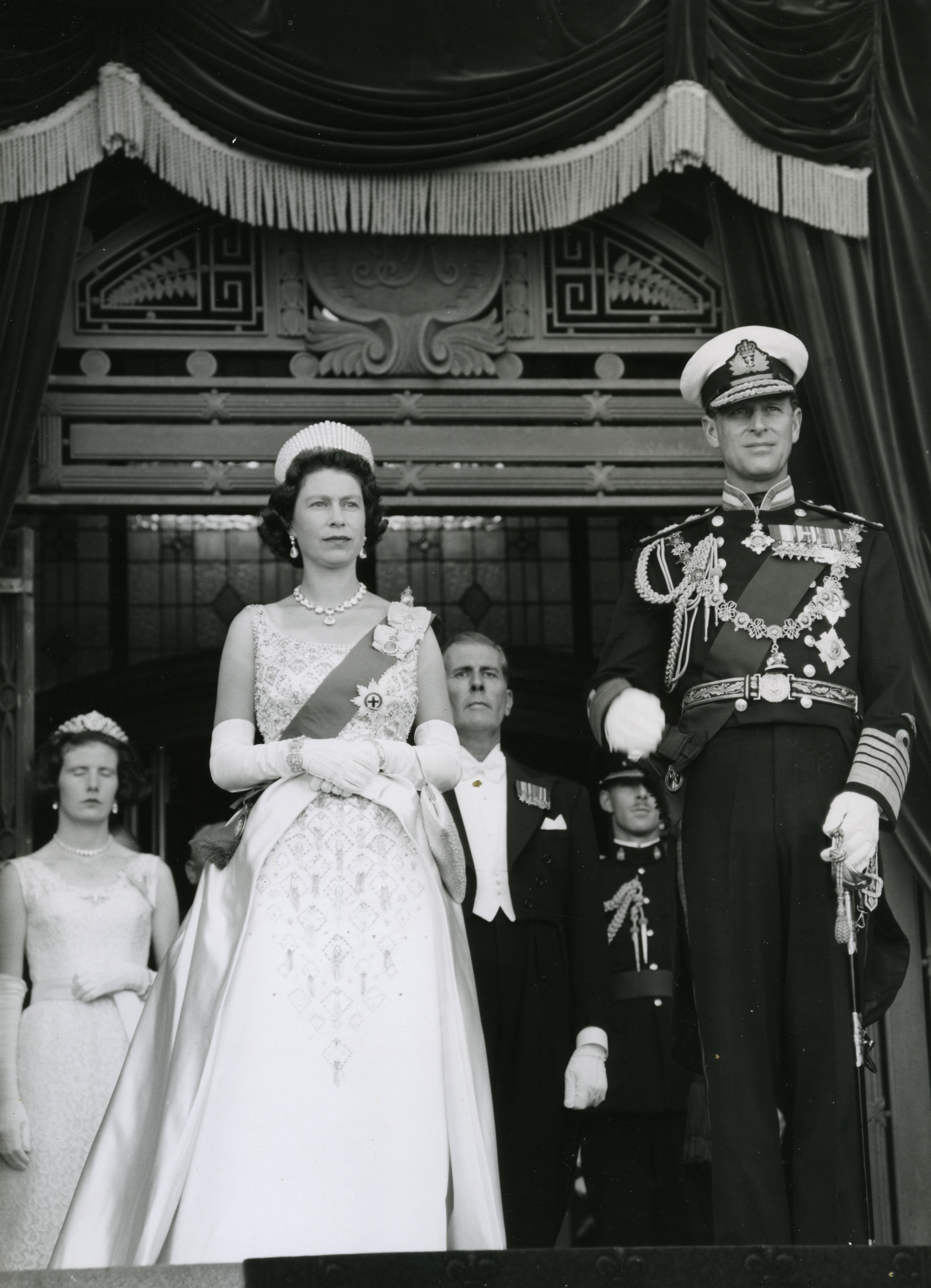
Queen Elizabeth II and Prince Philip at the Opening of Parliament in 1963

The monarch of New Zealand – currently King Charles III, represented in New Zealand by the governor-general, currently Dame Cindy Kiro – is one of the components of Parliament. This results from the role of the monarch to sign into law (i.e. give royal assent to) the bills that have been passed by the House of Representatives. MPs must make an oath or affirmation of allegiance to the monarch before they may take their seat, and the official opposition is traditionally dubbed His Majesty's Loyal Opposition.

=== House of Representatives ===
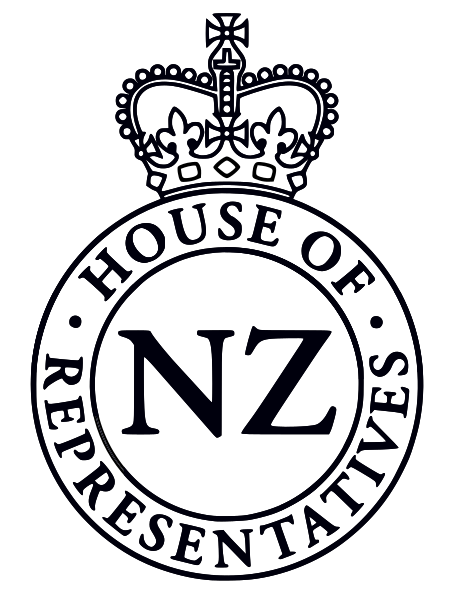
House of Representatives crest, surmounted by a St Edward's Crown

The House of Representatives was established as a lower house. Since 1951 it has been the Parliament's sole house. Parliamentary elections have been using the mixed-member proportional (MMP) system, a hybrid of first-past-the-post and closed party-list proportional representation, since 1996. The House consists of 120 members of Parliament (MPs), elected to a three-year term. There are 71 MPs representing single-member electorates of roughly the same population, while the remainder are list MPs. These MPs assemble to represent the people, pass laws and supervise the work of government. Members also form select committees of the House, appointed to deal with particular areas or issues.

Ministers in the New Zealand Government are drawn from amongst the members of the House of Representatives (with the possible exception of brief periods following an election). The government of the day, and by extension the prime minister, must achieve and maintain the support of the House in order to gain and remain in power. The Government is dependent on Parliament to implement its legislative agenda, and has always required the House's approval to spend money.

=== Legislative Council ===
The Legislative Council was part of the parliament until it was abolished at the end of 1950. The original Legislative Council was created by the 1840 Charter for Erecting the Colony of New Zealand. With the passing of the New Zealand Constitution Act 1852, it was reconstituted as the upper house of the General Assembly. The Council was intended to scrutinise and amend bills passed by the House of Representatives, although it could not initiate legislation or amend money bills. Despite occasional proposals for an elected Council, members of the Legislative Council (MLCs) were appointed by the governor, generally on the recommendation of the prime minister. It was eventually decided that the Council was having no significant impact on New Zealand's legislative process; its final sitting was on 1 December 1950.

The Parliament has not had an upper house since the Council was abolished, though there have been occasional suggestions to create one. The Legislative Council Chamber continues to be used during the Opening of Parliament. This is in keeping with the British tradition in which the monarch is barred from entering the lower house.

== Parliamentary sovereignty ==
The New Zealand Parliament has legislative supremacy or parliamentary sovereignty. It is able to legislate on any matter, and it can legislate without any formal restriction. It is not constrained by any supreme law, as codified constitutions are in some countries, as New Zealand has no such law; laws of a constitutional nature, such as the New Zealand Bill of Rights Act 1990, are not supreme laws. It is also not constrained by any federal division of powers. Acts of Parliament are not justiciable – they cannot be challenged by the judiciary or struck down, neither because they are unconstitutional, nor because they are contrary to a federal division of powers.

New Zealand has entrenched provisions, which cannot be changed by a simple majority in the House of Representatives, in only one statute, the Electoral Act 1993. The six entrenched provisions cover the length of the parliamentary term, how the country should be divided into electorates, the make-up of the Representation Commission, which decides on the electorates, the voting age, and the method of voting (secret ballot). Changing these provisions requires either a 75% vote in the House or a majority vote in a referendum. The entrenchment mechanism is not entrenched itself, so it could be repealed by a simple majority, thus allowing the entrenched provisions of the Electoral Act to also be repealed by a simple majority.

The House of Representatives has the exclusive power to regulate its own procedures.

== Term of Parliament ==
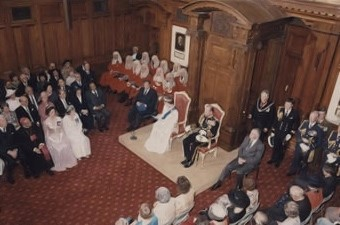
Queen Elizabeth II and Prince Philip at the Opening of Parliament, 13 November 1986

A term of the New Zealand Parliament may not last more than three years. The Constitution Act 1986 outlines that the governor-general is responsible for dissolving Parliament, (Note: The House of Representatives is regarded in law as always in existence, even when Parliament has been dissolved.) which is done by royal proclamation. Dissolution ends a parliamentary term, after which the writ for a general election is issued. Upon completion of the election, the governor-general, on the advice of the prime minister, then issues a proclamation summoning Parliament to assemble. On the date given, new MPs are sworn in and then called, along with returning MPs, to the old Legislative Council chamber, where they are instructed to elect their speaker and return to the House of Representatives to do so before adjourning.

A new parliamentary session is marked by the Opening of Parliament, during which the governor-general reads the Speech from the Throne, on the monarch's behalf. This speech is given at the start of every new Parliament, and explains why Parliament has been assembled. It outlines the Government's legislative agenda. On occasion, the monarch may open Parliament and personally deliver the speech; for example, Queen Elizabeth II personally attended the Opening of Parliament in 1954 (to mark the legislature's centenary), and more recently in 1986 and 1990.

MPs receive the royal summons to these events from the usher of the Black Rod, after the usher knocks on the doors of the House of Representatives chamber that have been slammed shut, to illustrate the MPs' right to deny entry to anyone, including the monarch.

== Passage of legislation ==
An act of Parliament. The short title is Haka Ka Mate Attribution Act 2014.

Before any law is passed, it is first introduced in Parliament as a draft known as a bill. The majority of bills are promulgated by the government of the day. It is rare for government bills to be defeated (the first to be defeated in the 20th century was in 1998). It is also possible for individual MPs to promote their own bills, called members' bills; these are usually put forward by opposition parties, or by MPs who wish to deal with a matter that parties do not take positions on. All bills must go through three readings in the House of Representatives before receiving the royal assent to become an act of Parliament (see lists of acts of the New Zealand Parliament).

=== House and committees ===
Each bill goes through several stages before it becomes a law. The first stage is the first reading, where MPs debate the bill in principle. It is normally sent to a select committee where the public has the opportunity to make submissions on the bill and the committee can recommend amendments to the bill. The select committee stage is followed by the second reading, where MPs again debate the bill in principle and the select committee recommendations. This is followed by the committee of the whole house, where MPs debate individual clauses or parts and make amendments. In the third reading, MPs debate the final form of the bill. If a majority of MPs vote in favour of the bill at its third reading, the bill is passed. If a majority of MPs vote against the bill at any reading, the bill is rejected and goes no further through the process.

=== Royal assent ===
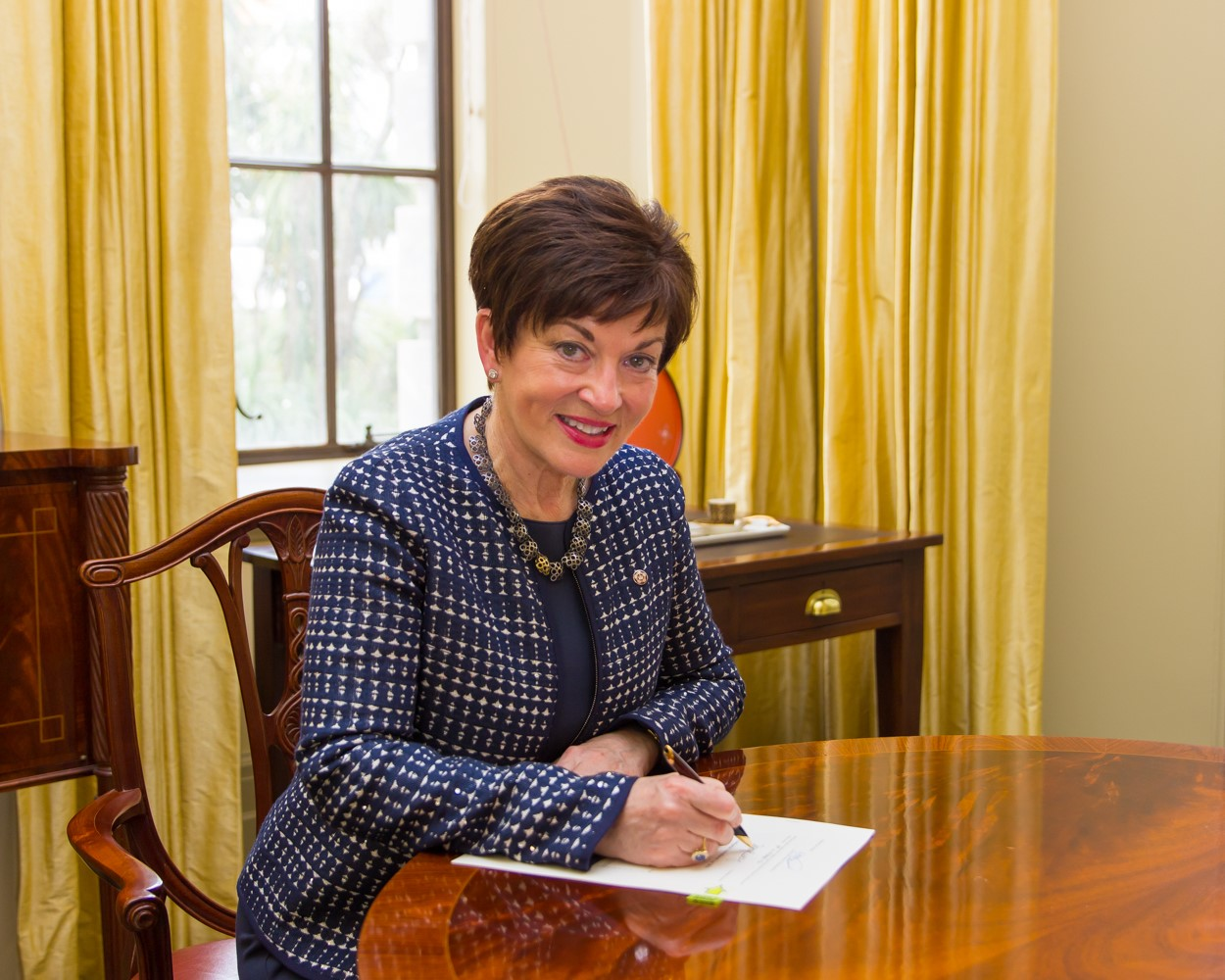
Governor-General Dame Patsy Reddy giving royal assent to a bill for the first time. Government House, Wellington, 28 September 2016

If a bill passes its third reading, the clerk of the House of Representatives delivers it to the governor-general, who, assuming that constitutional convention is followed, will grant royal assent as a matter of course. The governor-general retains the power to refuse royal assent, which they might do for a bill that would remove elections or abolish courts, or one that would amend an entrenched clause, but the bill had passed the House with the vote of less than 75% of its members. Such bills would be unlikely to pass, and the country would already be in a constitutional crisis if one did.

As a practical reality, because the royal assent to a bill must follow quickly after its passage by the House of Representatives, if there is any substantial issue about the constitutional validity of a bill, the issue must be considered by the attorney-general before the bill is introduced into the House. (Note: Section 7 of the New Zealand Bill of Rights Act 1990 (NZBORA) requires that the attorney-general report to the New Zealand Parliament on any bills that contain provisions that appear to be inconsistent with the NZBORA. See Bills reported as inconsistent with the New Zealand Bill of Rights Act 1990.)

== List of parliaments ==
Parliament is currently in its 54th term.

Term	Elected in	Government
Pre-party era
1st Parliament	1853 election	Non-partisan
2nd Parliament	1855 election	Non-partisan
3rd Parliament	1860 election	Non-partisan
4th Parliament	1866 election	Non-partisan
5th Parliament	1871 election	Non-partisan
6th Parliament	1875 election	Non-partisan
7th Parliament	1879 election	Non-partisan
8th Parliament	1881 election	Non-partisan
9th Parliament	1884 election	Non-partisan
10th Parliament	1887 election	Non-partisan
Liberal Party era
11th Parliament	1890 election	Liberal
12th Parliament	1893 election	Liberal
13th Parliament	1896 election	Liberal
14th Parliament	1899 election	Liberal
15th Parliament	1902 election	Liberal
16th Parliament	1905 election	Liberal
17th Parliament	1908 election	Liberal
Multi-party era
18th Parliament	1911 election	Reform
19th Parliament	1914 election	Reform
20th Parliament	1919 election	Reform
21st Parliament	1922 election	Reform
22nd Parliament	1925 election	Reform
23rd Parliament	1928 election	United
24th Parliament	1931 election	United–Reform coalition
25th Parliament	1935 election	First Labour
Two-party era
26th Parliament	1938 election	First Labour
27th Parliament	1943 election	First Labour
28th Parliament	1946 election	First Labour
29th Parliament	1949 election	First National
30th Parliament	1951 election	First National
31st Parliament	1954 election	First National
32nd Parliament	1957 election	Second Labour
33rd Parliament	1960 election	Second National
34th Parliament	1963 election	Second National
35th Parliament	1966 election	Second National
36th Parliament	1969 election	Second National
37th Parliament	1972 election	Third Labour
38th Parliament	1975 election	Third National
39th Parliament	1978 election	Third National
40th Parliament	1981 election	Third National
41st Parliament	1984 election	Fourth Labour
42nd Parliament	1987 election	Fourth Labour
43rd Parliament	1990 election	Fourth National
44th Parliament	1993 election	Fourth National
Mixed-member proportional era
45th Parliament	1996 election	Fourth National (in coalition)
46th Parliament	1999 election	Fifth Labour (in coalition)
47th Parliament	2002 election	Fifth Labour (in coalition)
48th Parliament	2005 election	Fifth Labour (in coalition)
49th Parliament	2008 election	Fifth National (minority)
50th Parliament	2011 election	Fifth National (minority)
51st Parliament	2014 election	Fifth National (minority)
52nd Parliament	2017 election	Sixth Labour (in coalition)
53rd Parliament	2020 election	Sixth Labour
54th Parliament	2023 election	Sixth National (in coalition)

== See also ==
- Bellamy's catering service
- Constitution of New Zealand
- List of legislatures by country
- Lists of acts of the New Zealand Parliament
- Politics of New Zealand
