= Make it 16 (Australia) =

Campaign to lower the voting age in Australia to 16

Make it 16 Australia
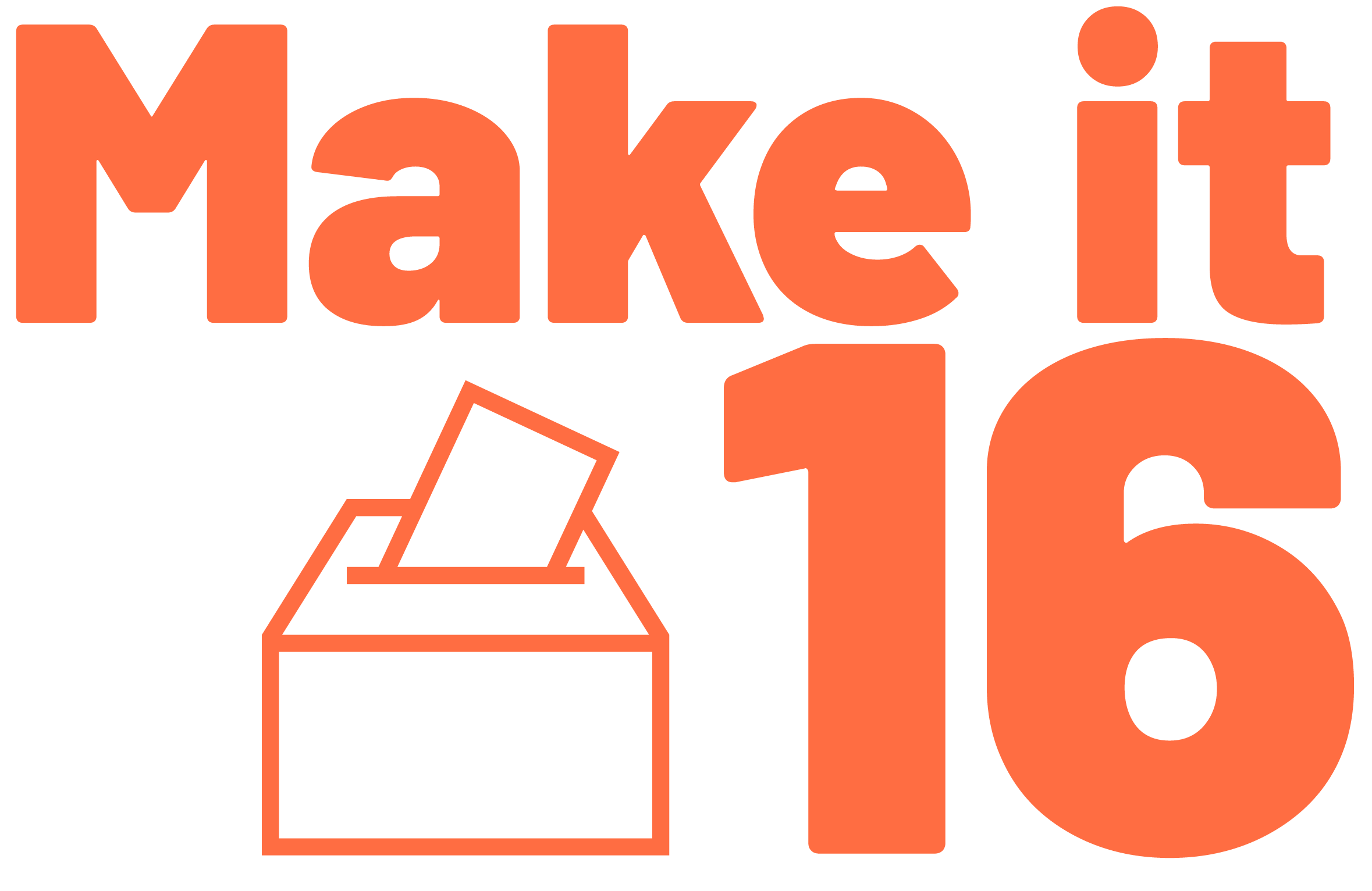
- Founded: 2022
- Type: Campaign
- Headquarters: Melbourne, Victoria
- Location: Australia
- Website: makeit16.au

Make it 16 is a youth-led campaign in Australia which campaigns for the reduction of the voting age to 16 for all elections. The campaign espouses several principles in favour of lowering the voting age. It is run by a group of young people, and supported by various organisations, including the Foundation for Young Australians and Run for It.

== Activity ==
After the commencement of the campaign, Australian Greens MP Stephen Bates introduced the Electoral Legislation Amendment (Lowering the Voting Age) Bill 2023, a Private member's bill, in the Australian Parliament, calling once more for the voting age to be lowered. The launch of this bill was attended by Make it 16 Australia campaigners at Parliament House in Canberra.

Following its partnership with the Foundation for Young Australians and Run for It, Make it 16 recruited for and formed its Youth Action Group (YAG), composed of two young people aged 14–19 from each state and territory, excluding the Northern Territory. The group has served as the main coordinators for the campaign, and is run by co-founders Archie Coppola and Tabitha Stephenson-Jones.

After the formation of its YAG, Make it 16 held its launch at Australian Parliament House on 13 June 2023. Its press conference on the day was hosted alongside politicians Andrew Wilkie and Monique Ryan, as well as Stephen Bates, who introduced the bill earlier in the year. The launch was met with strong reception from the media.

== Media coverage ==
Make it 16's Youth Action Group members have appeared on The Project, ABC Radio Melbourne, ABC Radio Adelaide, ABC Radio National, 3AW, 4BC, The Canberra Times, Triple J, Sky News, and was distributed by the AAP on its launch day.
