= New Zealand Bill of Rights Act 1990 =

1990 statute of the Parliament of New Zealand

New Zealand Bill of Rights Act 1990 Te Ture Pire o ngā Tika o Aotearoa 1990 (in Māori)

New Zealand Parliament
- Long title: An Act (a) To affirm, protect, and promote human rights and fundamental freedoms in New Zealand; and (b) To affirm New Zealand's commitment to the International Covenant on Civil and Political Rights
- Royal assent: 28 August 1990
- Commenced: 25 September 1990

Legislative history
- Introduced by: Geoffrey Palmer
- First reading: 10 October 1989
- Second reading: 14 August 1990
- Committee of the whole: 24 August 1990
- Third reading: 24 August 1990

Related legislation
- Human Rights Act 1993
- Status: Current legislation

The New Zealand Bill of Rights Act 1990 (Māori: Te Ture Pire o ngā Tika o Aotearoa 1990), sometimes known by the acronym NZBORA or simply BORA, is a statute of the Parliament of New Zealand and part of New Zealand's uncodified constitution. The Act sets out the rights and fundamental freedoms of anyone subject to New Zealand law as a bill of rights.

New Zealand's uncodified constitution heavily relies on parliamentary sovereignty with a unicameral parliament with few checks and balances due to the majority in parliament belonging to the government of the day. Following the Third National Government led by Robert Muldoon, New Zealand's constitutional arrangements became a major political issue and was a significant motivator for a Bill of Rights. As a result, the Bill of Rights was introduced in 1985 by Minister of Justice Geoffrey Palmer, originating from A Bill of Rights for New Zealand: A White Paper. It was originally proposed to be entrenched and supreme law, but following widespread controversy due to it granting the courts the ability to invalidate acts of parliament and contradicting parliamentary sovereignty, it was ultimately passed in 1990 as an ordinary act of parliament.

The Act applies to all acts done by the three branches of government, the executive, legislature and judiciary, and any other entity that is performing a public function. The rights guaranteed by the Act are also subject to "justified limitations", with limitations being consistent with the bill of rights if they can be "demonstrably justified in a free and democratic society". This limitation clause was included in the White Paper, with it recognising that "rights cannot be absolute". The Act also imposes a legal requirement on the attorney-general to provide a report to parliament whenever a bill is inconsistent with the Bill of Rights. There are many rights guaranteed by the Act across several different categories, which are: life and security of the person, democratic and civil rights, non-discrimination and the rights of minorities, search, arrest and detention, criminal procedure, fair trial, and double jeopardy and natural justice.

The Act does not provide a list of explicit legal remedies; as a result, remedies for breaches of rights within the Act have been developed by the courts since it was passed into law. Remedies developed by the courts include the exclusion of evidence, reduction in sentence, costs, damages and a declaration of inconsistency.

In present-day New Zealand, the Act is part of the public lexicon and has been used by many campaigns to initiate legal challenges, such as the Make It 16 campaign and on prisoners' voting rights. In 2013, a Constitutional Advisory Panel received submissions with concerns over the ineffectiveness of the Act and it allowing parliament to pass legislation that is inconsistent with the rights guaranteed by the Act. However, others also made submissions that they believed that the act was working satisfactorily and should be left as it is. It is an ongoing conversation amongst legal academics in New Zealand as to whether there should be an entrenched constitutional Bill of Rights that gives the court the power to strike down inconsistent legislation. The UN Human Rights Committee has also criticised New Zealand for the lack of the court's power to provide a remedy by striking down legislation inconsistent with the Act, equating this lack of power with a lack of human rights protection.

== History ==
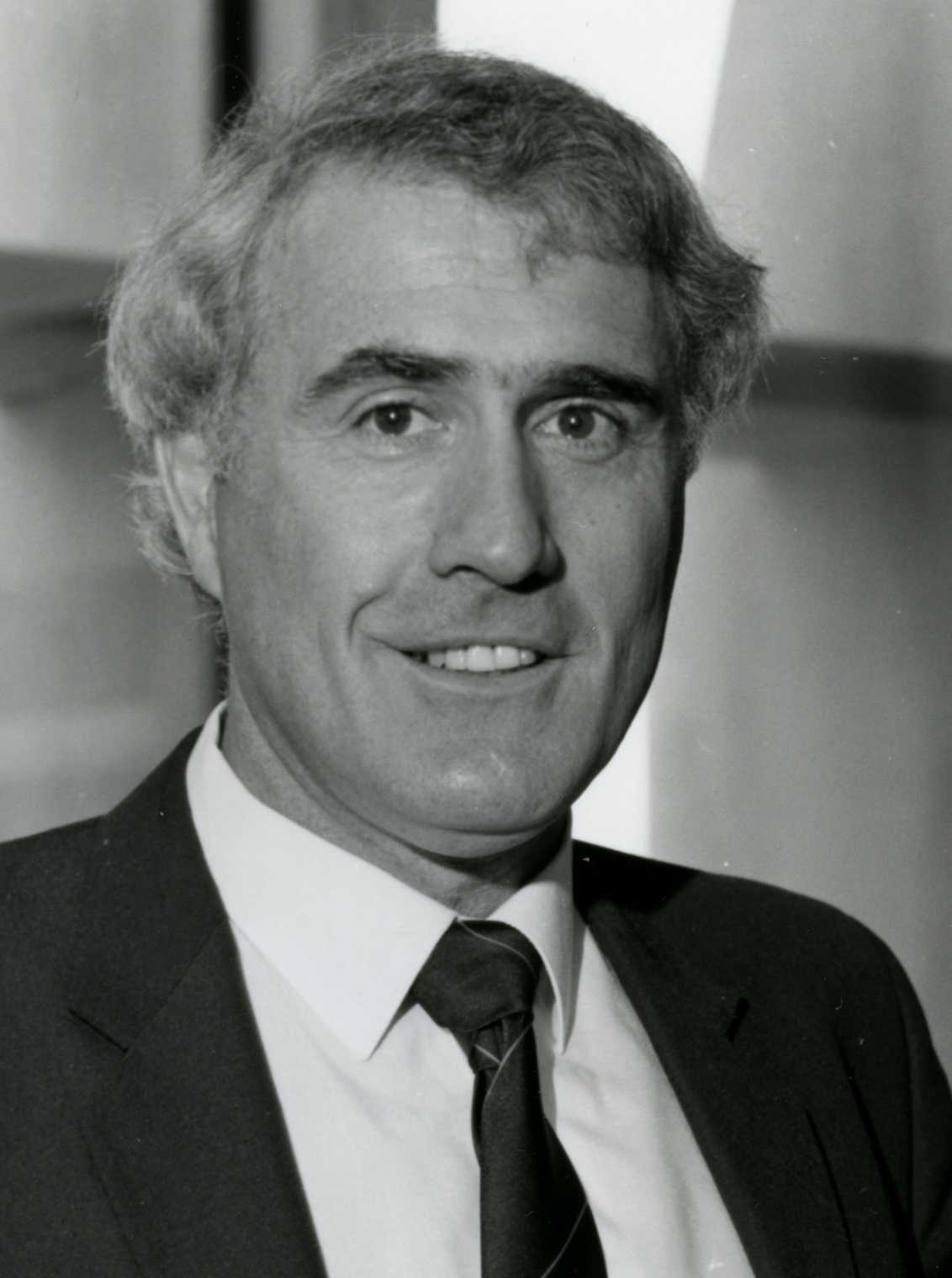
Minister of Justice Geoffrey Palmer introduced the Bill of Rights and several constitutional changes.

=== Background ===
New Zealand's constitutional framework is uncodified, often referred to as "unwritten". It relies on strict parliamentary sovereignty, also known as legislative supremacy, where acts of parliament can override any other law, including regulations made by the executive and common law established by the judiciary. Dean Knight and Matthew Palmer have labelled New Zealand's constitutional arrangements as "a purer Westminster model than in Westminster".

The New Zealand Parliament is unicameral, with only the lower house known as the House of Representatives, having abolished its upper house, the Legislative Council in 1951. Governments require a majority in the House of Representatives to govern, as such, the government can exercise significant power with little checks and balances. New Zealand's law-making has also been described as the fastest in the Western world.

New Zealand's constitutional arrangements became a major political issue following the Third National Government led by prime minister Robert Muldoon, with multiple issues such as Fitzgerald v Muldoon, where Muldoon suspended an act of parliament by press release. Secondly, the 1984 constitutional crisis where Muldoon failed to adhere to constitutional convention by refusing to devalue the dollar on the advice of the incoming Fourth Labour Government. A significant political factor in the introduction of a New Zealand Bill of Rights was to prevent another instance of the authoritarian approach to government that occurred under Muldoon.

The Treaty of Waitangi is the founding document of New Zealand, and was an agreement between the British Crown and around 540 Māori rangatira (chiefs) which promised several rights to Māori but lacked legal protection. Due to parliamentary sovereignty, any of these commitments can be overridden by ordinary acts of parliament.

=== A Bill of Rights for New Zealand: A White Paper ===
In 1985, the Minister of Justice, Geoffrey Palmer introduced to Parliament a document titled A Bill of Rights for New Zealand: A White Paper. The White Paper proposed the enactment of a law to protect certain rights and freedoms considered crucial for upholding liberty in a democratic society.

The White Paper proposed that the Bill of Rights become entrenched law so that it could not be amended or repealed without a qualified majority of 75% in Parliament or a simple majority in a referendum, therefore having status as supreme law. Furthermore, the Treaty of Waitangi was to be fully incorporated into the Bill of Rights, also elevating the Treaty's status to that of supreme law to recognise and affirm their rights under the Treaty. Lastly, the judiciary would have the power to invalidate any act of parliament, common law rule or official action by the executive that was contrary to the Bill of Rights. Due to its status as supreme law and the ability for the judiciary to invalidate legislation, the Bill of Rights would contradict parliamentary sovereignty in New Zealand. As a result, it sparked widespread debate due to those controversial features.

In 1986, a meeting of Māori tribal leaders argued that incorporating the Treaty of Waitangi into a Bill of Rights would diminish the status of the Treaty, and that it would enable parliament to amend the Treaty without the consent of Māori as the treaty partner, which resulted in it not being included in the Act from its introduction into parliament.

The Justice and Law Reform Select Committee considered the White Paper, and recommended that New Zealand was "not ready" for a bill of rights in the form proposed. The Committee recommended that the Bill of Rights be introduced as an ordinary statute, which would not have the status of supreme or entrenched law.

=== Parliamentary readings ===
==== First reading ====
On 10 October 1989, the 42nd New Zealand Parliament debated and passed the New Zealand Bill of Rights Act 1990 in its first reading. The proposed bill followed the recommendations of the select committee and was an ordinary statute without entrenchment. Despite this, Palmer introduced the legislation with the aim of providing some protection for civil and democratic rights. An article in The Press referred to the bill two days after its first reading as "watered down" and a "Bill of Lesser Rights?".

Voting at first reading (10 October 1989)
Party	Voted for	Voted against
Labour (56)	40: Geoff Braybrooke; David Butcher; David Caygill; Helen Clark; Anne Fraser; Sonja Davies; Peter Dunne; Harry Duynhoven; Jack Elder; Fred Gerbic; Phil Goff; Bruce Gregory; Jonathan Hunt; Bill Jeffries; Judy Keall; Graham Kelly; Annette King; Trevor Mallard; Russell Marshall; Clive Matthewson; Ralph Maxwell; Colin Moyle; Peter Neilson; Geoffrey Palmer; Richard Prebble; Ross Robertson; David Robinson; Stan Rodger; Noel Scott; Margaret Shields; Larry Sutherland; Jim Sutton; Elizabeth Tennet; John Terris; Whetu Tirikatene-Sullivan; Bob Tizard; Allan Wallbank; Koro Wētere; Philip Woollaston; Trevor Young	0
National (40)	0	29: Derek Angus; John Banks; Bill Birch; Jim Bolger; John Carter; Warren Cooper; Wyatt Creech; John Falloon; George Gair; Doug Graham; Jeff Grant; Doug Kidd; Graeme Lee; John Luxton; Roger McClay; Don McKinnon; Ian McLean; Maurice McTigue; Denis Marshall; Robert Muldoon; Rob Munro; Katherine O'Regan; Winston Peters; Ruth Richardson; Jenny Shipley; Lockwood Smith; Rob Storey; Simon Upton; Merv Wellington
Tellers (Note: Tellers are considered as voting with their respective side, but their votes are not officially cast and therefore not included in the final vote.)	Margaret Austin and Richard Northey	Robert Anderson and Robin Gray
Totals	40	29

==== Second reading ====
On 14 August 1990, the New Zealand Bill of Rights Act 1990 was debated and passed at its second reading. Geoffrey Palmer said in parliament that the months of scrutiny and discussion had not cleared up much off the misunderstanding of the Bill of Rights legislation, and spent most of his speech explaining what he said were misconceptions. He further stated that the Treaty of Waitangi was not referred to in the legislation and that many Māori people opposed its reference in the Bill of Rights, claiming that "this does not represent a back-down by the government but rather a sensible appreciation of the realities".

Voting at second reading (14 August 1990)
Party	Voted for	Voted against
Labour (56)	40: Margaret Austin; Fred Gerbic; Peter Neilson; Jim Sutton; Geoff Braybrooke; Phil Goff; Richard Northey; Peter Tapsell; David Butcher; Bruce Gregory; Richard Prebble; Elizabeth Tennet; David Caygill; Jonathan Hunt; Ross Robertson; Whetu Tirikatene-Sullivan; Helen Clark; Annette King; David Robinson; Allan Wallbank; Anne Fraser; Jenny Kirk; Stan Rodger; Philip Woollaston; Michael Cullen; David Lange; Noel Scott; Trevor Young; Sonja Davies; Russell Marshall; Margaret Shields; Trevor de Cleene; Clive Matthewson; Ken Shirley; Peter Simpson; Jack Elder; Roger Douglas; Colin Moyle; Larry Sutherland; Judy Keall	0
National (40)	0	25: Robert Anderson; Jeff Grant; Ian McLean; Rob Storey; Warren Cooper; Doug Kidd; Denis Marshall; Simon Upton; Wyatt Creech; Warren Kyd; Katherine O'Regan; Merv Wellington; Paul East; Graeme Lee; Winston Peters; Venn Young; John Falloon; John Luxton; Ruth Richardson; Jenny Shipley; John Carter; Doug Graham; Murray McCully; Lockwood Smith; Robin Gray
Tellers	Bill Dillon and Ralph Maxwell	Jim Gerard and Roger McClay
Totals	40	25

==== Third reading ====
The New Zealand Bill of Rights Act 1990 passed its third reading on 24 August 1990 and received royal assent on 28 August 1990. It came into force on 25 September 1990.

Voting at third reading (24 August 1990)
Party	Voted for	Voted against
Labour (56)	32: Peter Neilson; Jim Sutton; Geoff Braybrooke; Richard Northey; Peter Tapsell; David Butcher; Bruce Gregory; Richard Prebble; Elizabeth Tennet; David Caygill; Jonathan Hunt; Ross Robertson; Whetu Tirikatene-Sullivan; Helen Clark; David Robinson; Allan Wallbank; Anne Fraser; Jenny Kirk; Stan Rodger; Philip Woollaston; Michael Cullen; Trevor Young; Sonja Davies; Russell Marshall; Clive Matthewson; Ken Shirley; Peter Simpson; Jack Elder; Roger Douglas; Colin Moyle; Larry Sutherland; Judy Keall	0
National (40)	0	24: Robert Anderson; Jeff Grant; Ian McLean; Rob Storey; Warren Cooper; Doug Kidd; Simon Upton; Wyatt Creech; Warren Kyd; Katherine O'Regan; Merv Wellington; Winston Peters; John Falloon; John Luxton; Ruth Richardson; John Carter; Doug Graham; Murray McCully; Robin Gray; Roger Maxwell; Don McKinnon; George Gair; Jim Gerard; Roger McClay
Tellers	Jack Elder and Colin Moyle	John Falloon and John Luxton
Totals	32	24

== Application of the Act ==
The Act applies to acts done by any of the three branches of government in New Zealand. Additionally, it also applies to any person or body in the "performance of any public function, power, or duty" imposed by the law; for example, council-controlled organisations.

Section 4 of the Act denies the Bill of Rights supremacy over other legislation. This does not lessen the scope of what the Act applies to; as the section states, it only means the courts cannot implicitly repeal or revoke, make invalid or ineffective, or decline to apply any provision of any statute made by parliament, whether before or after the Act was passed, because it is inconsistent with the Bill of Rights. In effect, this means that the courts cannot strike down legislation, however, it may still issue a declaration of inconsistency. Section 6 states that where another act can be interpreted that is consistent with the Bill of Rights, the courts are obliged to use the most consistent interpretation.

In section 5, one of the core provisions in the Act allows for "justified limitations" on the rights guaranteed throughout the Bill of Rights. It says that the rights are "subject only to such reasonable limits prescribed by law as can be demonstrably justified in a free and democratic society", which is the same wording as in Canada's Charter of Rights and Freedoms. This wording was intentionally copied, with the White Paper recognising that "rights cannot be absolute" and that the Canadian approach provided better regulated direction from the courts, allowing them to focus on whether a limit was reasonable and demonstrably justified than relying on the detailed exclusion clauses that are in the International Covenant on Civil and Political Rights.

In section 7 of the Act, the attorney-general is required to draw the attention of parliament to the introduction of any bill that is inconsistent with the Bill of Rights. The Ministry of Justice, which prepares this advice for the attorney-general, requires a minimum of two weeks to review draft legislation.

== Rights guaranteed by the Act ==
=== Life and the security of the person ===
The Act guarantees a range of rights as part of the right to life and security of person in sections 8 to 11 to every person present in New Zealand. These are the right not to be deprived of life except in accordance with fundamental justice. Furthermore, that every person has a right in section 8 not to be subjected to torture or to cruel, degrading, or disproportionately severe treatment or punishment. In addition, it guarantees the right not to be subject to medical or scientific experimentation without consent, and the right to refuse to undergo any medical treatment, except where a person is involuntarily committed.

=== Democratic and civil rights ===
The Act guarantees two fundamental electoral rights in section 12 for New Zealand citizens who are of or over the age of 18. Firstly, it guarantees the right to vote in elections to elect members of the New Zealand Parliament, guaranteeing that they are held by equal suffrage and secret ballot. Secondly, it guarantees the right to become a member of the New Zealand House of Representatives.

Furthermore, in section 13, the Act guarantees everyone the right to freedom of thought, conscience, religion and belief, including the right to adopt and hold opinions without interference. The Act also guarantees, in section 15, everyone the right to manifest their religion or belief in worship, observance, practice, or teaching, either individually or in a community with others, and either in public or in private.

In addition, in section 14, it confirms a right to freedom of expression, which includes the freedom to seek, receive and impart information and opinions of any kind and in any form. The right of peaceful assembly is also guaranteed by section 16 and the right to freedom of association is guaranteed in section 17.

The right to freedom of movement and residence is also guaranteed in section 18, with New Zealand citizens given the right to enter New Zealand, and everyone else the right to leave New Zealand. It also guarantees that non-New Zealand citizens who are lawfully in New Zealand have a right to not be required to leave except under a decision taken under grounds prescribed in law.

=== Non-discrimination and the rights of minorities ===
Freedom from discrimination is guaranteed in section 19 of the Act. The Act uses the prohibited grounds of discrimination that are listed in the Human Rights Act 1993, which covers discrimination law for employment, access to public places, among other things. The prohibited grounds include, but are not limited to, a right against discrimination on the basis of sex, sexual orientation, disability, race, and ethnic and national origins.

Rights of ethnic, religious and linguistic minorities are also guaranteed, with section 20 of the Act providing protection against minorities, individually and as part of their community, being denied the right to enjoy their culture, profess and practice their religion, or to use their language.

=== Search, arrest and detention ===
Everyone is guaranteed under the Act in section 21 a right to be secure from unreasonable search or seizure of the person, their property and correspondence. The right against arbitrary arrest and detention is also guaranteed by section 22.

People who are arrested or detained are guaranteed a set of rights relating to their arrest or detention in section 23 of the Act. These are: firstly, the right to be informed of the reason for the arrest or detention at the time it occurs. Secondly, the right to consult and instruct a lawyer without delay and to be informed of that right. Thirdly, the right to challenge the validity of the arrest or detention without delay by habeas corpus and to be released if the arrest or detention is unlawful. Furthermore, everyone arrested or detained has the right to be treated with humanity and dignity, and the right to refrain from making any statement and to be informed of that right. In addition, people who are arrested for a crime have both a right to be charged promptly or to be arrested, and those who are not released have a right to be promptly brought before a court or tribunal.

=== Criminal procedure ===
Everyone who is charged with an offence is guaranteed a set of rights under section 24 of the Act. They are guaranteed the right to be informed promptly and in detail the nature and reasoning of the charge, to be released under reasonable terms and conditions unless there is a just cause to continue their detention, the right to consult a lawyer and to adequate time and facilities to prepare a defence, the right to a lawyer without a cost if it is in the interests of justice and the person does not have the funds to pay for legal assistance, and the right to a free interpreter if the person cannot understand or speak the language used in court.

Furthermore, everyone charged has a right to a trial by jury if the offence they are charged with carries a term of imprisonment of 2 years or longer. However, this right does not apply to people being tried by a military tribunal under military law.

=== Fair trial ===
Everyone who is charged with a crime is guaranteed with a set of rights to ensure their fair trial as a defendant by section 25 of the Act. These rights are, the right to a fair and public hearing by an independent and impartial court, the right to be tried without an undue delay, the right to a presumption of innocence, the protection against self-incrimination through the right not to be compelled to be a witness or profess guilt.

Furthermore, the defendant has the right to be present at their own trial and present a defence, the right to examine the prosecution's witnesses and to call their own witnesses, the right to retroactive application of the more lenient law, the right to appeal their conviction or sentence to a higher court, and the right for a child to be tried in a manner that is appropriate for their age.

=== Double jeopardy and natural justice ===
Double jeopardy is covered in section 26 of the Act, which guarantees that no one should be held liable for an act or omission that at the time it occurred, was not an offence. This protects people from being charged under new crimes for acts or omissions they committed prior to the new crime existing. Furthermore, the protects people from being tried or punished for a crime that they have already been finally convicted, pardoned, or acquitted for.

Everyone is granted the right, in section 27, to the observance of the principles of natural justice by any tribunal or other public authority that has the power to make a determination regarding a person's rights, obligations, or interests that are protected or recognised by law. Furthermore, every person also has the right to bring civil proceedings against, and to defend civil proceedings brought by, the Crown, and to have those proceedings heard, according to law, in the same way as civil proceedings between individuals.

== Remedies and consequences ==
The Act does not provide a list of explicit legal remedies within itself for when one of the rights contained in the Act has been breached. As a consequence, a significant amount of case law has developed, with the Court of Appeal holding on several occasions that it has the jurisdiction to develop new remedies as it sees fit. As discussed in Taunoa v Attorney-General, the focus of remedies under the Act is to provide vindication in such a way that upholds the importance of the right, rather than invokes punishment for its breach. As such, court decisions can often include a combination of remedies in order for the breached right to be properly vindicated.

=== Exclusion of evidence ===
A common remedy under the Act is that the evidence obtained through breaching a right is inadmissible in court. This initially developed in the courts as a presumption of exclusion but was subsequently lessened to a balancing exercise where various factors are weighed up to determine the admissibility of evidence tainted by a breach of the Act. This remedy is now reflected in section 30 of the Evidence Act 2006.

=== Reduction in sentence ===
A reduction in sentence can be granted as a remedy in cases where section 25(b) of the Act has been breached: the right to be tried without undue delay. In R v Williams, the Supreme Court held that a reduction in sentence was a generous response and more appropriate remedy than a stay of proceedings, except for extremely minor offending.

=== Costs ===
The regular rule that costs will follow the event is not always the case under the Act. In some cases, the court can reduce costs for claims under the Act that were worthy, even if they were ultimately unsuccessful, particularly where a claim results in clarifying an important area of public law and was in the public interest rather than solely just in the public's benefit.

=== Damages ===
==== Compensatory damages ====
In Simpson v Attorney-General, the Court of Appeal awarded compensatory damages under the Act. This was a new remedy under the Act. In this case, the plaintiffs were seeking damages for a search warrant executed on their place of residence that was obtained on the basis of incorrect information. The police were informed that the warrant was based on false information, but they continued with the search nonetheless. The Court of Appeal held that the Court had an inherent jurisdiction to develop remedies under the Act, and that compensation was an appropriate remedy in this case. Court of Appeal president Robin Cooke stated that the court would "fail in our duty if we did not give an effective remedy to a person whose legislatively affirmed rights have been infringed". The Court of Appeal thus held that there is a public law action available against the Crown for a breach of the Act. It is likely to only be available to those who do not attain a suitable alternative remedy for a breach of the Act.

Compensation under Act is discretionary and the Supreme Court of New Zealand has emphasised that it is just one of many public law remedies and that non-monetary remedies will often be more appropriate. There are relatively few examples of where compensation for violations of the Bill of Rights have been awarded, with the record being labelled as "extremely thin" by legal academic Geoff McLay. Most significantly, in Taunoa v Attorney-General the Supreme Court awarded compensatory damages for breaches of the Bill of Rights by the Department of Corrections' Behaviour Management Regime.

==== Exemplary damages ====
It is stated in Small v Attorney-General that exemplary damages are an inappropriate remedy under the Act, because the focus should be on compensation rather than punishment. Exemplary damages were awarded in Archbold v Attorney-General, but Justice William Young qualified this remedy by stating that he would alternatively have awarded the same amount as public law compensation for the breach. Later, the Court of Appeal overruled Archbold in S v Attorney-General without any discussion of Archbold. Whether a court can award exemplary damages for a public claim of a breach of the Act is therefore uncertain.

=== Declaration of inconsistency ===
A declaration of inconsistency is a remedy in the form of a formal declaration by a court of law that legislation is inconsistent with a right contained in the Act. It was first made available as a remedy following the litigation in Taylor v Attorney-General.

In July 2015, Justice Heath at the High Court of Auckland in Taylor v Attorney-General issued a formal declaration of inconsistency that an electoral law amendment introduced by the Fifth National Government that removed the ability of inmates voting rights in the Electoral Act 1993, was an unjustified limitation under section 12(a) of the New Zealand Bill of Rights Act 1990, which prescribes voting rights to all citizens aged 18 years and over. This was the first declaration of inconsistency in New Zealand.

On 29 August 2022, the New Zealand Bill of Rights (Declarations of Inconsistency) Amendment Act 2022 received Royal assent and commenced on the same day. The amendment act introduced a legal requirement for the Attorney-General to notify parliament when a declaration of inconsistency is made, and further that the responsible Minister must present a report to parliament that details the government's response to the declaration.

On 21 November 2022, the Supreme Court in Make It 16 Incorporated v Attorney-General affirmed the jurisdiction confirmed by the court in Attorney-General v Taylor and noted the passing of the amendment act.

=== Other remedies ===
Several other remedies were suggested to be available in R v Grayson. These included a reduction in the penalty, police disciplinary proceedings, criminal prosecution, a declaration, or future-looking relief. Other remedies have included special jury directions, and orders that witness testimony be disregarded. It can often depend on the nature of the right breached as to what remedy will be appropriate to vindicate that breach.

== Reception ==
=== Public and political ===
In present-day New Zealand, the Act has now largely become a part of the public lexicon and has had a broad and evolving impact. The Act has been used by many campaigns to initiate legal challenges against the government and legislation, such as the Make It 16 campaign, which successfully argued in front of the Supreme Court that the voting age of 18 was unjustified age discrimination. Notably, the Taylor v Attorney-General case on prisoners' voting rights which resulted in a significant change in New Zealand's constitutional landscape and human rights law.

Furthermore, the Act was heavily relied upon during the COVID-19 protests in New Zealand, particularly during the 2022 Wellington protest, an occupation of the parliamentary grounds. The High Court quashed the vaccine mandate for New Zealand Police and New Zealand Defence Force staff, stating it "breached their rights under the Bill of Rights Act" and that it infringed on section 11 (the right to refuse to undergo medical treatment) and section 15 (manifestation of religion and belief) of the Act. In contrast, High Court Justice Francis Cooke ruled the vaccine mandate justified for doctors and teachers due to the potential vulnerability of patients and the concern of a transmission risk within schools. He further noted that the right to refuse medical treatment is not absolute.

During the select committee stage of passing a law in parliament, many individuals and organisations use the Act to argue against bills that may breach the rights guaranteed by the Act. Recently, the Electoral Amendment Act 2025 was an example of this, with many submissions arguing it would "breach the New Zealand Bill of Rights Act, disenfranchise communities, create a restrictive enrolment environment", and that prisoners' should retain the right to vote.

In the 2013 Constitutional Advisory Panel's full report, it was identified that there are a range of opinions and perspectives on the Act by the public from its submissions. One grouping identified that the effectiveness could be improved; raising concern with the comprehensiveness of the Act, that it is too easy to pass legislation that is inconsistent with the rights guaranteed by the Act and that it is too easy to change the Act. However, another group believed that the Act was "working satisfactorily, and should be left as it is to avoid the risk of uncertainty".

=== Academia ===
It is an ongoing conversation amongst legal academics in New Zealand as to whether there should be an entrenched constitutional Bill of Rights that gives the court the power to strike down inconsistent legislation. Academics such as Geoffrey Palmer have argued that an entrenched Bill of Rights would "protect New Zealanders against breaches of their fundamental rights", allowing the courts to step in and enforce the Bill of Rights against laws passed by parliament. In contrast, former University of Otago law professor James Allan argued against entrenchment on the basis that the lack of a written constitution allows for an "incredibly democratic set-up" that allows for each generation to vote for politicians who can change the constitution and "do what they think is best".

In a 2006 New Zealand Herald article, it was mentioned that Canadian political scientist Rand Dyck has criticised the Act, stating that "Canadians would regard the New Zealand Bill of Rights as weak". Furthermore, that Lord Cooke of Thorndon has described the Act as being "regarded internationally as one of the weakest affirmations of human rights".

Article 2(3) of the International Covenant on Civil and Political Rights requires parties to the treaty to ensure that any person whose rights and freedoms have been breached to have an effective remedy. Despite this, the Act does not provide a list of explicit legal remedies within itself for when one of the rights contained in the Act has been breached. The UN Human Rights Committee has criticised New Zealand for the lack of the court's power to provide a remedy by striking down legislation inconsistent with the Act. They equated this lack of power with a lack of human rights protection.

The resistance to an entrenched Bill of Rights in New Zealand is also partly because the country is governed by parliamentary sovereignty. Giving the courts the power to strike down Parliament's legislation would be contrary to the doctrine of parliamentary supremacy.

Geoffrey Palmer and Andrew Butler published a book in 2016 entitled A Constitution for Aotearoa New Zealand that laid out a proposed entrenched bill of rights, including a judicial power of strike down. This was intended to start a conversation in New Zealand as to whether entrenching their Bill of Rights in a constitution was the way forward. In their second book, Towards Democratic Renewal, they stated that they succeeded at their goal of starting a conversation, having travelled the country and receiving written submissions on the issue. Their second book provided an updated supreme law constitution for New Zealand, including an entrenched bill of rights. It provides the power for courts to strike down inconsistent legislation, while still giving parliament the power to override the courts with a 75% qualified majority. It also includes similarities with the current Act, such as a justified limitations clause.
