= Simpson v Attorney-General =

Case in New Zealand regarding the New Zealand Bill of Rights Act

Simpson v Attorney General [Baigent's case]
- Court: Court of Appeal of New Zealand
- Full case name: Simpson v Attorney General [Baigent's case]
- Decided: 29 July 1994
- Citation: [1994] 3 NZLR 667
- Transcript: High Court judgment

Court membership
- Judges sitting: Cooke P, Casey J, Hardie Boys J, Gault J, Mackay J

Keywords
- Negligence, Search and Seizure, New Zealand Bill of Rights Act 1990, Damages

Simpson v Attorney General [Baigent's case] [1994] 3 NZLR 667 is a leading case in New Zealand regarding the New Zealand Bill of Rights Act, that upheld damages against the police for an unreasonable search.

The case involved police who had been legally issued a search warrant relating to a drug bust but executed the warrant at the wrong address. Despite knowing the address was incorrect, the police continued to search the property. The family of the person who had been wrongfully searched sued the Crown arguing breaches of section 21 of the New Zealand Bill of Rights Act 1990, which protects against unreasonable search and seizure. Previously, no case had awarded damages for breaches of the New Zealand Bill of Rights Act and there was no mention of damages in the legislation itself. The Crown argued that they had immunity from prosecution or alternatively that if they did not have immunity, the plaintiffs were not entitled to any remedy other than a declaration of non-compliance with the Bill of Rights. The Court of Appeal felt that a mere declaration would be "toothless" and subsequently awarded damages.

The decision is significant for multiple reasons. It allows plaintiffs to initiate a cause of action for breaches of the New Zealand Bill of Rights Act, a previously unavailable remedy. Where a plaintiff has an existing cause of action but feels the remedy is insufficient, they are also able to sue under this ground additionally.

The case was criticised as representing an example of judicial activism, and that Parliament did not intend to offer financial compensation for breaches of the act. This was particularly true because in New Zealand, the act is not entrenched nor does it achieve the status of "Supreme Law" like similar nations have in their constitutions. However, following the decision, the Law Commission advised Parliament not to overrule the decision, and Parliament has since followed this advice.

== Background ==
Detective Murray Robert Drummond was advised by an informant that a Troy O'Brien was involved in the use and sale of cannabis at his residence of 16 Main Road, Korokoro, Lower Hutt. While he was preparing his application for a search warrant, he discovered that there was no "Main street" in Korokoro. Further inquiries suggested the address was either 16 London Street, or 16 Korokoro Road. The detective then asked the local power company about whether Troy O'Brien was the account holder for either, and the power company erroneously informed the police that Troy O'Brien was the account holder for both addresses.

For unknown reasons, the detective then filed for a search warrant for only 16 London Street, which later turned out to be the address of Elisabeth Baigent, and not Troy O'Brien as intended.

On 18 October 1991, the police arrived at the London Street address to execute the search warrant. Upon arrival in the street, the police told any suspicious neighbours to "mind their own business", but then later relented and asked the neighbours whether Baigent lived at this address, and were not only told that Troy O'Brien did not reside at this address, but that the address they were looking for was 16 Korokoro Road.

The search warrant continued, and they talked to Baigent's son, who informed them they had the wrong address, and even showed them his passport to prove his identity. When this had no effect, he got his sister on the telephone, who was a solicitor. She spoke to the police there, told them she was an officer of the High Court, and advised them that they had the wrong address.

The police replied "We often get the wrong (address), but while we are here we will have a look around anyway", and the police proceeded with the search, despite clearly having doubts of the address being incorrect.

Baigent claimed this was an unreasonable search, which is illegal under section 21 of the New Zealand Bill of Rights Act (1990), and sued the Attorney General (on behalf of the police). The police argued that the search was backed by a court issued search warrant, and that even if the search was a breach of the Bill of Rights Act, the Act made no reference to the entitlement of damages, adding that the police had immunity for damages under section 6(5) of the Crown Proceedings Act [1956] anyway.

At first instance, the AG managed to have Baigent's claim struck out.

== Decision ==
In Attorney General v Chapman, in a 3 to 2 decision, the Supreme Court restricted the application of damages to only acts done by the executive or legislative branches, thereby excluding damages for breaches by the judiciary.
