= 39th New Zealand Parliament =

Term of the Parliament of New Zealand

39th Parliament of New Zealand
| ← | 38th Parliament | 40th Parliament | → |
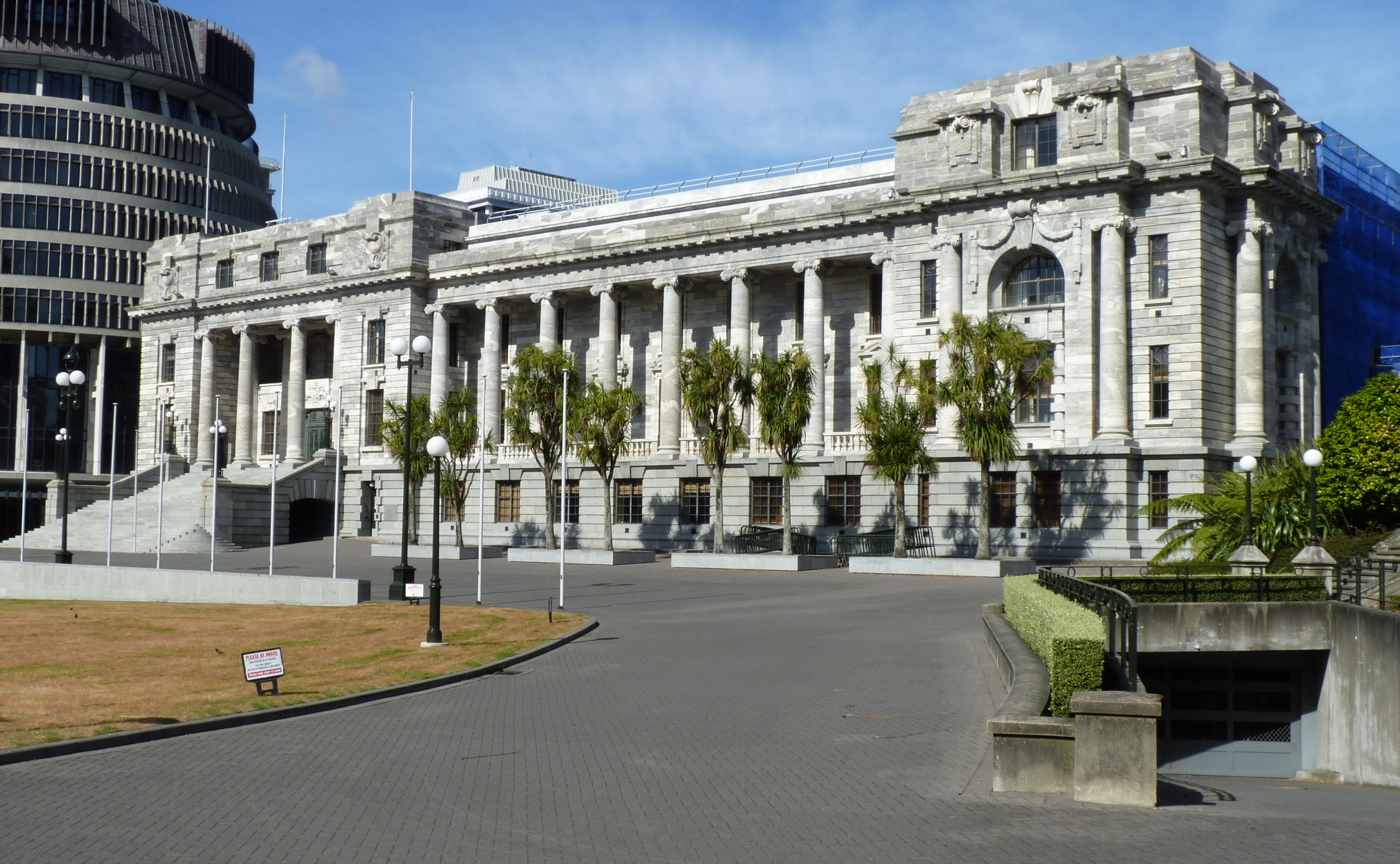
- Parliament House, Wellington

Overview
- Legislative body: New Zealand Parliament
- Term: 16 May 1979 – 23 October 1981
- Election: 1978 New Zealand general election
- Government: Third National Government

House of Representatives
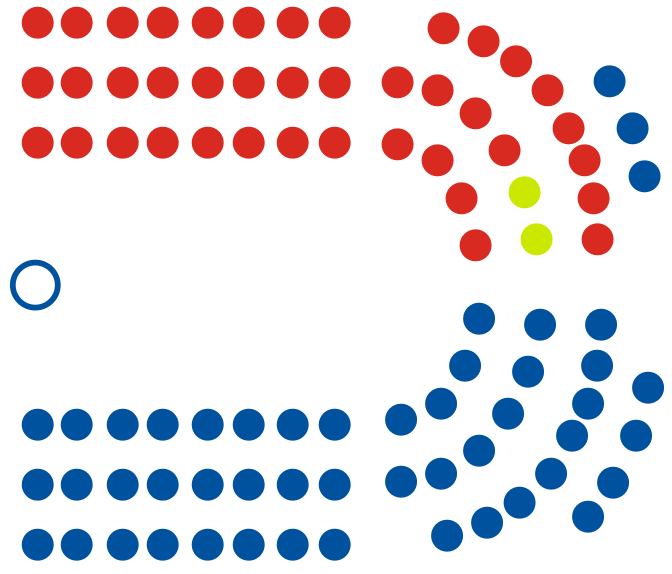
- Members: 92
- Speaker of the House: Richard Harrison
- Leader of the House: David Thomson
- Prime Minister: Robert Muldoon
- Leader of the Opposition: Bill Rowling

Sovereign
- Monarch: Elizabeth II
- Governor-General: David Beattie from 6 November 1980 — Keith Holyoake until 25 October 1980

Sessions
- 1st: 16 May 1979 – 14 December 1979
- 2nd: 15 May 1980 – 12 December 1980
- 3rd: 28 May 1981 – 23 October 1981

The 39th New Zealand Parliament was a term of the Parliament of New Zealand which began with the general election held on 25 November 1978, and finished with the general election held on 28 November 1981. The dates of the Muldoon Ministry were from 13 December 1978 to 11 December 1981.

The Prime Minister, Robert Muldoon of the National Party, led the Third National Government from 1975 to 1984.

== Overview of seats ==
The table below shows the number of MPs in each party following the 1978 election and at dissolution:

| Affiliation | Members | |
| Affiliation | At 1978 election | At dissolution |
|---|---|---|
| National | 51 | 50 |
| Government total | 51 | 50 |
| Labour | 40 | 40 |
| Social Credit | 1 | 2 |
| Opposition total | 41 | 42 |
| Total | 92 | 92 |
| Working Government majority | 10 | 8 |

Notes

- The Working Government majority is calculated as all Government MPs less all other parties.

== Initial composition of the 39th Parliament ==
The tables below shows the results of the 1978 general election:

Key

National Labour Social Credit

Electorate results for the 1978 New Zealand general election
| Electorate | Incumbent | Winner | Majority | Runner up |
|---|---|---|---|---|
General electorates
| Albany | New electorate | Don McKinnon | 1,159 | David Rankin |
| Ashburton | New electorate | Rob Talbot | 3.005 | John Srhoy |
| Auckland Central | Richard Prebble | | 5,284 | Maire Cole |
| Avon | Mary Batchelor | | 8,215 | Tom George |
| Awarua | Rex Austin | | 1,450 | Bill Devine |
| Bay of Islands | New electorate | Neill Austin | 1,682 | William Guy McPherson |
| Birkenhead | Jim McLay | | 2,534 | Rex Stanton |
| Christchurch Central | Bruce Barclay | | 5,947 | Gwen Clucas |
| Clutha | Peter Gordon | Robin Gray | 1,427 | F A O'Connell |
| Dunedin Central | Brian MacDonell | | 3,413 | M B Ablett |
| Dunedin North | Richard Walls | Stan Rodger | 2,850 | Richard Walls |
| East Cape | New electorate | Duncan MacIntyre | 2,533 | O P Drabble |
| East Coast Bays | Frank Gill | | 1,566 | Colleen Hicks |
| Eastern Hutt | New electorate | Trevor Young | 5,373 | Rosemary Young |
| Eden | Aussie Malcolm | | 648 | John Hinchcliff |
| Fendalton | New electorate | Eric Holland | 1,956 | David Close |
| Gisborne | Bob Bell | | 213 | Allan Wallbank |
| Hamilton East | Ian Shearer | | 1,361 | Lois Welch |
| Hamilton West | Mike Minogue | | 1,006 | Dorothy Jelicich |
| Hastings | Bob Fenton | David Butcher | 334 | Bob Fenton |
| Hauraki | New electorate | Leo Schultz | 2,019 | Gordon Miller |
| Hawkes Bay | Richard Harrison | | 1,908 | Mike Cullen |
| Helensville | New electorate | Dail Jones | 1,199 | Jack Elder |
| Heretaunga | Ron Bailey | | 2,744 | John Ward |
| Horowhenua | New electorate | Geoff Thompson | 744 | Alan Charles Eyles |
| Hunua | New electorate | Winston Peters | 192 | Malcolm Douglas (Note: The election of Malcolm Douglas in Hunua was overturned by the Electoral Court on 24 May 1979) |
| Invercargill | Norman Jones | | 256 | Aubrey Begg |
| Island Bay | Gerald O'Brien | Frank O'Flynn | 650 | Bill Nathan (Note: Gerald O'Brien came third standing as Independent Labour) |
| Kaimai | New electorate | Bruce Townshend | 3,476 | Douglas Conway |
| Kaipara | New electorate | Peter Wilkinson | 520 | Nevern McConachy |
| Kapiti | Barry Brill | | 23 | Margaret Shields (Note: Margaret Shields had initially been declared the winner but she lost 83 votes in a magisterial recount) |
| King Country | Jim Bolger | | 2,770 | Leo Menefy |
| Lyttelton | Colleen Dewe | Ann Hercus | 1,423 | Colleen Dewe |
| Manawatu | Allan McCready | Michael Cox | 2,913 | Trevor de Cleene |
| Mangere | David Lange | | 6,263 | Peter Saunders |
| Manurewa | Merv Wellington | Roger Douglas | 2,467 | Peter O'Brien |
| Marlborough | Ed Latter | Doug Kidd | 323 | Ian Brooks |
| Matamata | New electorate | Jack Luxton | 4,407 | David Mawdsley |
| Miramar | Bill Young | | 315 | Bill Jeffries |
| Mt Albert | Warren Freer | | 2,861 | Frank Ryan |
| Napier | Gordon Christie | | 2,927 | Kevin Rose |
| Nelson | Mel Courtney | | 2,239 | Peter Malone |
| New Lynn | Jonathan Hunt | | 4,390 | Jacky Bridges |
| New Plymouth | Tony Friedlander | | 112 | Dennis Duggan |
| North Shore | George Gair | | 4,650 | Gene Leckey |
| Onehunga | Frank Rogers | | 1,417 | Barrie Hutchinson |
| Ohariu | New electorate | Hugh Templeton | 1,958 | Helene Ritchie |
| Otago | New electorate | Warren Cooper | 3,722 | R J Rutherford |
| Otahuhu | Bob Tizard | | 4,762 | Ray Ah Chee |
| Pahiatua | John Falloon | | 6,675 | P M A Hills |
| Pakuranga | Gavin Downie | Pat Hunt | 2,111 | Elsa Smith |
| Palmerston North | John Lithgow | Joe Walding | 2,736 | John Lithgow |
| Papakura | New electorate | Merv Wellington | 3,622 | Geoff Braybrooke |
| Papanui | Bert Walker | Mike Moore | 3,289 | Bert Walker |
| Papatoetoe | New electorate | Eddie Isbey | 1,511 | Colin Bidois |
| Pencarrow | New electorate | Fraser Colman | 3,649 | Brett Newell |
| Porirua | Gerry Wall | | 3,657 | Alan Perry |
| Rangiora | Derek Quigley | | 1,145 | Don McKenzie |
| Rangiriri | New electorate | Bill Birch | 2,276 | Robert Frederick McKee |
| Rangitikei | Bruce Beetham | | 2,853 | Les Gandar |
| Remuera | Allan Highet | | 5,771 | Lee Goffin |
| Roskill | Arthur Faulkner | | 1,671 | John Banks |
| Rotorua | Harry Lapwood | Paul East | 1,020 | Peter Tapsell |
| St Albans | Roger Drayton | David Caygill | 3,679 | Neil Russell |
| St Kilda | Bill Fraser | | 2,959 | Graeme Laing |
| Selwyn | New electorate | Colin McLachlan | 1,232 | Bill Woods |
| Sydenham | John Kirk | | 7,040 | Ian Wilson |
| Tamaki | Robert Muldoon | | 6,310 | Audie Cooke-Pennefather |
| Taranaki | New electorate | David Thomson | 4,573 | K A Tracey |
| Tarawera | New electorate | Ian Mclean | 2,022 | JJ Stewart |
| Tasman | Bill Rowling | | 1,794 | Ruth Richardson |
| Taupo | Ray La Varis | Jack Ridley | 609 | Lesley A. Miller |
| Tauranga | Keith Allen | | 3,318 | Paul Hills |
| Te Atatu | Michael Bassett | | 2,819 | W R Cross |
| Timaru | Sir Basil Arthur | | 2,183 | Bill Penno |
| Waikato | Lance Adams-Schneider | | 5,063 | Brian West |
| Waipa | New electorate | Marilyn Waring | 4,906 | John Kilbride |
| Wairarapa | Ben Couch | | 837 | Allan Levett |
| Waitakere | New electorate | Ralph Maxwell | 2,016 | Bill Haresnape |
| Waitaki | New electorate | Jonathan Elworthy | 1,315 | Bill Laney |
| Waitotara | New electorate | Venn Young | 4,109 | Edith Charteris |
| Wallace | Brian Talboys | | 5,324 | Jim Thomson |
| Wanganui | Russell Marshall | | 3,102 | John Rowan |
| Wellington Central | Ken Comber | | 916 | Neville Pickering |
| West Coast | Paddy Blanchfield | Kerry Burke | 5,647 | George Ferguson |
| Western Hutt | Bill Lambert | John Terris | 168 | Bill Lambert |
| Whangarei | John Elliott | | 1,176 | Colin Moyle |
| Yaldhurst | New electorate | Mick Connelly | 1,638 | David Watson |
Māori electorates
| Eastern Maori | Paraone Reweti | | 7,400 | Monty Searancke |
| Northern Maori | Matiu Rata | | 4,844 | Joe Toia |
| Southern Maori | Whetu Tirikatene-Sullivan | | 9,180 | Charles Piharo Maitai |
| Western Maori | Koro Wētere | | 9,719 | Gordon Pihema |

Table footnotes:

== By-elections during 39th Parliament ==
There were a number of changes during the term of the 39th Parliament.

| Electorate and by-election | | Date | Incumbent | Cause | Winner |
|---|---|---|---|---|---|
| Christchurch Central | 1979 | 18 August | Bruce Barclay | Death | Geoffrey Palmer |
| Northern Maori | 1980 | 7 June | Matiu Rata | Resignation | Bruce Gregory |
| Onehunga | 1980 | 7 June | Frank Rogers | Death | Fred Gerbic |
| East Coast Bays | 1980 | 6 September | Frank Gill | Appointed as Ambassador to US | Gary Knapp |

=== Summary of changes during term ===
- Bruce Barclay, the Labour MP for Christchurch Central, died in 1979. The ensuing by-election was won by Geoffrey Palmer, also of the Labour Party.
- Matiu Rata, a Labour cabinet minister, resigned from his party in 1979 due to disagreements with its policy towards Māori. In 1980, Rata quit parliament and founded the Mana Motuhake party. Rata then contested the ensuing by-election, but came second. He was replaced by Bruce Gregory of the Labour Party.
- Frank Rogers, the Labour MP for Onehunga, died in 1980. The ensuing by-election was won by Fred Gerbic, also of the Labour Party.
- Frank Gill, the National MP for East Coast Bays, resigned from parliament in 1980 in order to take up a position as New Zealand's ambassador in Washington. The ensuing by-election was won, much to the National Party's surprise, by Gary Knapp of the Social Credit Party.
