= Sue Wood =

New Zealand politician (born 1948)

Susanne Mary Wood (born 1948) served as the president of the New Zealand National Party from 1982 to 1986, the youngest person and the first woman to hold the post.

== Early life and career ==
Wood was born in Onehunga, Auckland in 1948. She attended Onehunga High School, the University of Auckland, graduating in history, and Auckland Teachers College. She was a swimming champion and coach from 1967 to 1976, and a cadet at the Auckland Star newspaper. She later became a teacher at Onehunga High School.

== Political activity ==
Wood has been a teacher, journalist, swimming coach and business woman both before and after becoming involved in politics. She first became active in the Young Nationals in the late 1960s and early 1970s. In 1974 she became secretary of the party's Epsom branch, becoming women's vice-president in 1977 and serving on the Dominion Policy Committee from 1979.

Wood stood as the party candidate for Onehunga in a 1980 by-election. Though performing well, she was unsuccessful, losing to Labour's Fred Gerbic. Based on her performance as National's candidate in the by-election, party president George Chapman stated Wood "should be in Parliament and as soon as possible" by being a candidate in a safe seat. At that time there was already speculation about the retirement of Frank Gill, the MP for East Coast Bays, media commented that Chapman was hinting at his seat. When Gill announced his retirement, after being appointed Ambassador to the United States, Wood was nominated for the National candidacy. One of 12 nominations, she was regarded as one of the front-runners to win, and made the 5 candidate shortlist. Ultimately however, she lost out to Don Brash. At the 1981 general election she again contested Onehunga, losing to Gerbic once again.

Her term as president, from 1982 to 1986, included the latter years of the Third National Government of Robert Muldoon, the 1984 general election, and the associated constitutional crisis as well as grappling with internal party politics. In 1987, after the sudden death of Kaimai MP Bruce Townshend, Wood was a candidate for the National nomination in Kaimai at the 1987 election but lost the selection to Robert Anderson.

At the 2002 general election she stood in the seat of Mana, being defeated by Labour MP Luamanuvao Winnie Laban. Although she held a relatively high party-list ranking of 19, National's poor overall result in the 2002 election meant that she failed to enter Parliament.

She was the campaign manager for Auckland Future in 2016.

== Honours ==
In 1993, Wood was awarded the New Zealand Suffrage Centennial Medal.

Party political offices
Preceded by George Chapman	President of the National Party; 1982–1986	Succeeded by Neville Young
