= John Collinge =

New Zealand politician

John Gregory Collinge (born 10 May 1939) is a New Zealand former lawyer, politician and diplomat. His former roles include president of the New Zealand National Party and High Commissioner to the United Kingdom.

== Early life ==
Collinge was born in the Hastings suburb of Mahora in 1939. He attended Paeroa District High School from 1952 to 1955 and Hastings Boys' High School in 1956. He played for the 1st XI cricket and 1st XV rugby union teams at both schools.

He obtained a LLB from the University of Auckland in 1962, where he was senior scholar in law. He captained the Auckland Brabin Shield (under 20 years) cricket XI (in 1958) and New Zealand Universities XI (1961–1963). He was awarded a Shell scholarship (1962) which took him to University College, Oxford (1963–1965), where he obtained a master's degree (MLitt) and played cricket for the university, appearing in first-class matches against County sides.

== Professional career ==
Collinge lectured law at the University of Leeds (1965–1966) and commercial law as senior lecturer at the University of Melbourne (1966–1969). He wrote three legal texts: The Law of Competition in New Zealand (Butterworths, 1982, 2nd Edition); Tutorials in Contract (Law Book Company, 1989, 4th Ed); and The Law of Marketing in Australia & New Zealand (Butterworths, 1990, 2nd Ed).

He practised law in Auckland and engaged in local politics. He became chairman of the Auckland Electric Power Board for 12 years (1980–1992) and chairman of the policy and finance committee of the Auckland Regional Authority for three (1991–1994). He was president of the Electrical Development Association of New Zealand (1991–1993) and chairman of the National Civil Defence Energy Planning (1992–1993).

He held company chairmanships: New Zealand Pelagic Fisheries Ltd (1975–1981) and United Distillers (NZ) Ltd (1991) as well as many deputy chairmanships and directorships. He was awarded the title Keeper of the Quaich by the Scotch Whisky Association (1994).

He was chairman of the Commerce Commission (from 1984 to 1989), presiding over the introduction of the Commerce Act 1986 and the Fair Trading Act 1986, thereby overseeing business conduct and de-regulation after the Douglas reforms.

He was president of the National Party (from 1989 to 1994) during the successful elections of 1990 and 1993. He was then appointed High Commissioner to the United Kingdom and Ambassador to Ireland and to Nigeria from 1994 to 1997. He was appointed chairman of the Intergovernmental Committee on the Criteria for Commonwealth Membership, of which New Zealand was independently a member (1996–1997).

He represented New Zealand internationally, including as chairman of the South Pacific Electrical Convention (Sydney, 1981); chairman of Session, World Alcohol & Drug Conference (Glagow, 1992); leader of delegation to People's Republic of China for the National Party (1992); New Zealand representative at the Relief of Warsaw Bi-Centenary (Warsaw, 1995); and head of delegation, European Bank for Redevelopment (Sofia, 1996).

Some other roles include: chairman of Alcohol Advisory Council of New Zealand (1991–1994); trust member of the Auckland Energy Consumer Trust (2003–2006); president of Auckland Rotary Club (2017–2018); patron of the British New Zealand Business Association (1998–present); author of An Identity for New Zealand? (Thesaurus Press, 2010); principal, John Collinge, Barrister & Solicitor. He is a self-declared monarchist. In 1990, he was awarded the New Zealand 1990 Commemoration Medal.

Party political offices
Preceded by Neville Young	President of the National Party; 1989–1994	Succeeded by Lindsay Tisch
Diplomatic posts
Preceded by George Gair	High Commissioner of New Zealand to the United Kingdom; 1994–1997	Succeeded by Richard Grant
