= 1980 Onehunga by-election =

New Zealand by-election

| ← 1978 general | 7 June 1980 | 1981 general → |
- Turnout: 13,600 (50.23%)

| Candidate | Fred Gerbic | Sue Wood | Thomas Keith Park |
| Party | Labour | National | Social Credit |
| Popular vote | 6,543 | 5,336 | 1,535 |
| Percentage | 48.12 | 39.24 | 11.29 |
MP before election
Frank Rogers
Labour
Elected MP
Fred Gerbic
Labour

The Onehunga by-election of 1980 was a by-election for the Onehunga electorate during the 39th New Zealand Parliament. It was prompted by the death of Frank Rogers, a Labour Party MP. It was held on 7 June 1980 and was won by Fred Gerbic, also of the Labour Party.

It was held the same day as another by-election in Northern Maori.

== Candidates ==
=== Labour ===
As Onehunga was a safe Labour seat, there was a large amount of interest in the candidacy from the local Labour Party. In 1975 Rogers had won selection over 26 other aspirants for the seat after Hugh Watt retired. Initially, there was intense speculation that party president Jim Anderton (who was the proprietor of a business in the electorate) would stand. However he eventually declined, fulfilling a promise he made at the 1979 party conference that he would not stand for parliament at, or before, the next election.

The candidates for the nomination were:

- Reg Boorman, a Masterton painter and chairman of the Wairarapa Labour electorate committee
- Malcolm Douglas, former MP for Hunua who unsuccessfully stood for the Onehunga nomination in 1975
- Fred Gerbic, Auckland's Industrial Conciliator and former chairman of the New Lynn and Titirangi Labour electorate committees
- Lee Goffin, a school deputy-principal and secretary of the Royal Oak Branch who was Labour's candidate for Remuera in 1978
- Roy Harward, a teacher who was spokesman for the Citizens Action Group lobbying against a liquefied petroleum gas depot in Onehunga
- Colleen Hicks, the regional officer of the Nurses Association and Labour's candidate for East Coast Bays in 1978
- Dorothy Jelicich, a Hamilton City Councillor and former MP for Hamilton West
- George Karaitiana, a local lawyer
- Hugh McCarthy, a pharmacist and chairman of the Hunua Labour electorate committee
- Murray McDowell, a local school teacher and chairman of Labour's Te Papapa Oranga branch
- Bill Morrison, a local purchasing clerk
- Morris Renouf, a teacher and secretary of the Onehunga Labour electorate committee
- Reverend Peter Wedde, a local Presbyterian minister

Despite the large number of candidates, three had emerged as frontrunners by the time nominations had closed; Douglas, Gerbic and Jelicich. The selection meeting was a rancorous one with many local members resentful of interventions by the party head office and candidates from outside the electorate. The local members were supportive of Douglas and Jelicich, with Labour leader Bill Rowling and the party hierarchy favouring Gerbic. The meeting took several hours, running so late that the decision had yet to be made at 1:30 am, the cut-off time for printing, and thus could not be reported in the morning newspapers. A floor vote of the local party members was clearly won by Douglas, with Jelicich second and Gerbic third. Two of the local members on the selection panel backed Jelicich with the other local member, and the three head office selectors voting for Gerbic, giving him the nomination. His success as the nominee was announced by Anderton to the 400 members present at 2:45 am.

The chairman of the Onehunga Labour electorate committee, George Madden, was controversially denied a place on the selection panel. As such, there was allegations of the panel being "stacked" to favour head office. Several Onehunga Labour members went as far as to resign their membership, pledging to instead vote for the Social Credit candidate in protest. Gerbic's selection was, however, openly welcomed by Anderton, Rowling and Sir Tom Skinner.

=== National ===
Three people sought the National Party candidature.

- Ross Baxter, former chairman of National's Remuera electorate committee
- Stuart McDowell, former deputy chairman of National's Hamilton East electorate committee
- Sue Wood, a high school teacher who was Women's vice-president of the National Party

Wood was chosen as the National candidate. She was strongly backed by leader Robert Muldoon and party president George Chapman.

=== Others ===
- Thomas Keith Park, a grocer who had contested Onehunga in 1978, was chosen again to represent the Social Credit Party.
- Dianne Paton, a local housewife and candidate for Onehunga in 1978, intended to stand for the Values Party. However her nomination was submitted to the returning officer after the nomination period had ended due to a "dates mix-up". While Paton could not contest the seat, she encouraged party supporters to vote informally by writing "Values" on the bottom of their ballot papers.
- Stuart Perry, a newspaper sales manager from Papatoetoe, ran as an independent candidate in protest of (in his view) politicians putting party allegiances ahead of their constituents.
- Vince Terreni, an architect stood to draw attention to the clearance of Freemans Bay houses and redevelopment of the area by the Auckland City Council. He was the founding Chairman of Ponsonby-Freemans Bay Planning Association 1970–1972 and had contested Eden in 1978.

== Campaign ==
Gerbic took a leave of absence from his job as an Industrial Conciliator, he was not classed as a civil servant under the electoral act and therefore not obliged to resign. He was however cautioned by the Minister of Labour Jim Bolger on the future of his position should he lose the election. Bolger's comments were in retaliation to Gerbic criticizing the government's handling of an industrial dispute during construction of the Mangere Bridge. The controversy surrounding the Labour nomination notwithstanding, the campaign was free from any acrimony between the candidates and their supporters. The by-election was a low-key affair with little public interest. Consequently, turnout dropped over ten percent.

== Results ==
The following table gives the election results:

1980 Onehunga by-election
| Party | Candidate | Votes | % | ±% |
|---|---|---|---|---|
| Labour | Fred Gerbic | 6,543 | 48.12 | |
| National | Sue Wood | 5,336 | 39.24 | |
| Social Credit | Thomas Keith Park | 1,535 | 11.29 | −0.06 |
| Independent | Stuart Perry | 134 | 0.99 | |
| Cheer Up | Vince Terreni | 35 | 0.26 | |
| Imperial British Conservative | Max Overton | 17 | 0.13 | |
| Majority | | 1,207 | 8.87 | |
| Turnout | | 13,600 | 50.23 | −10.04 |
| Registered electors | | 27,071 | | |
| Labour hold | | Swing | | |
