= Shadow Cabinet of David Lange =

New Zealand shadow cabinet (1983–1984)

New Zealand political leader David Lange assembled a shadow cabinet system amongst the Labour caucus following his election to the position of Leader of the Opposition in 1983. He composed this of individuals who acted for the party as spokespeople in assigned roles while he was leader (1983–84).

As the Labour Party formed the largest party not in government, the frontbench team was as a result the Official Opposition of the New Zealand House of Representatives.

== Frontbench team ==
Lange allocated portfolios on 16 March to caucus, but withheld any rankings. Lange announced the rankings at the beginning of April when the parliamentary session began for the year.

The list below contains a list of Lange's spokespeople and their respective roles:

Rank	Shadow Minister	Portfolio/s
1	David Lange	Leader of the Opposition
2	Geoffrey Palmer	Deputy Leader of the Opposition; Shadow Minister of Justice
3	Mike Moore	Shadow Minister of Overseas Trade; Shadow Minister of Marketing; Shadow Minister of Tourism
4	Hon Roger Douglas	Shadow Minister of Finance
5	Frank O'Flynn	Shadow Attorney-General
6	Koro Wētere	Shadow Minister of Maori Affairs
7	David Caygill	Shadow Minister of Trade and Industry
8	Russell Marshall	Shadow Minister of Education
9	Richard Prebble	Shadow Minister of Transport; Shadow Minister of Railways
10	Hon Fraser Colman	Shadow Minister of Works and Development
11	Hon Bob Tizard	Shadow Minister of Energy; Shadow Minister of National Development
12	Rt Hon Bill Rowling	Shadow Minister of Foreign Affairs
13	Jonathan Hunt	Shadow Minister of Broadcasting; Senior Whip
14	Stan Rodger	Shadow Postmaster-General; Junior Whip
15	Dr Michael Bassett	Shadow Minister of Health
16	Ann Hercus	Shadow Minister of Social Welfare; Shadow Minister of Consumer Affairs; Shadow Minister of Women's Affairs
17	Hon Colin Moyle	Shadow Minister of Agriculture
18	Hon Sir Basil Arthur	Shadow Minister of Lands; Shadow Minister of Fisheries; Shadow Minister of Rural Banking
19	Eddie Isbey	Shadow Minister of Labour
20	Kerry Burke	Shadow Minister of Regional Development
21	Dr Gerard Wall	Shadow Minister of Immigration; Shadow Minister of Pacific Islands Affairs
22	Brian MacDonell	Shadow Minister of Customs; Shadow Minister of EQC
23	Trevor Young	Shadow Minister of Police
24	Hon Whetu Tirikatene-Sullivan	Shadow Minister of Forests
25	Mary Batchelor	Shadow Minister of Urban Affairs
26	John Kirk	Shadow Minister of Civil Aviation; Shadow Minister of Meteorological Services
27	David Butcher	Shadow Minister for State Insurance; Shadow Minister for the Government Life Office
28	Fred Gerbic	Shadow Minister of Industrial Conciliation; Shadow Minister for ACC
29	Rev John Terris	Shadow Minister of Internal Affairs; Shadow Minister of Civil Defence
30	Ralph Maxwell	Shadow Minister of Primary Industries; Shadow Minister of Horticulture
31	Dr Bruce Gregory	Shadow Minister of Arts & Culture
32	Hon Mick Connelly	Shadow Minister of Defence
33	Margaret Shields	Shadow Minister of Science & Technology; Shadow Minister of Statistics
34	Peter Neilson	Shadow Minister of Employment; Shadow Minister of Productivity
35	Bill Jeffries	Associate Shadow Minister of Labour
36	Phil Goff	Shadow Minister of Housing
37	Trevor de Cleene	Shadow Minister of Revenue; Shadow Minister of Friendly Societies
38	Dr Michael Cullen	Shadow Minister for the Environment
39	Helen Clark	Shadow Minister of Overseas Aid; Shadow Minister of Disarmament
40	Geoff Braybrooke	Shadow Minister of War Pensions; Shadow Minister of Rehabilitation
41	Dr Peter Tapsell	Shadow Minister of Sport & Recreation; Shadow Minister of Youth Affairs
42	Philip Woollaston	Shadow Minister of Local Government
43	Fran Wilde	Shadow Minister of State Services
