= Moyle Affair =

1976 New Zealand political scandal

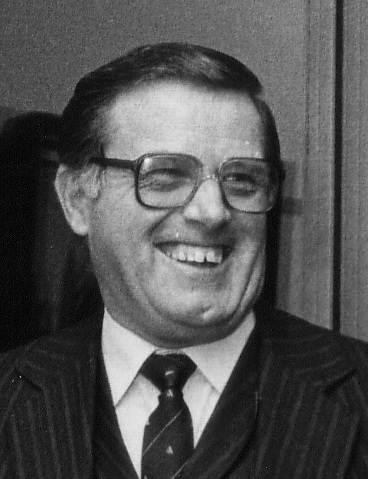
Colin Moyle

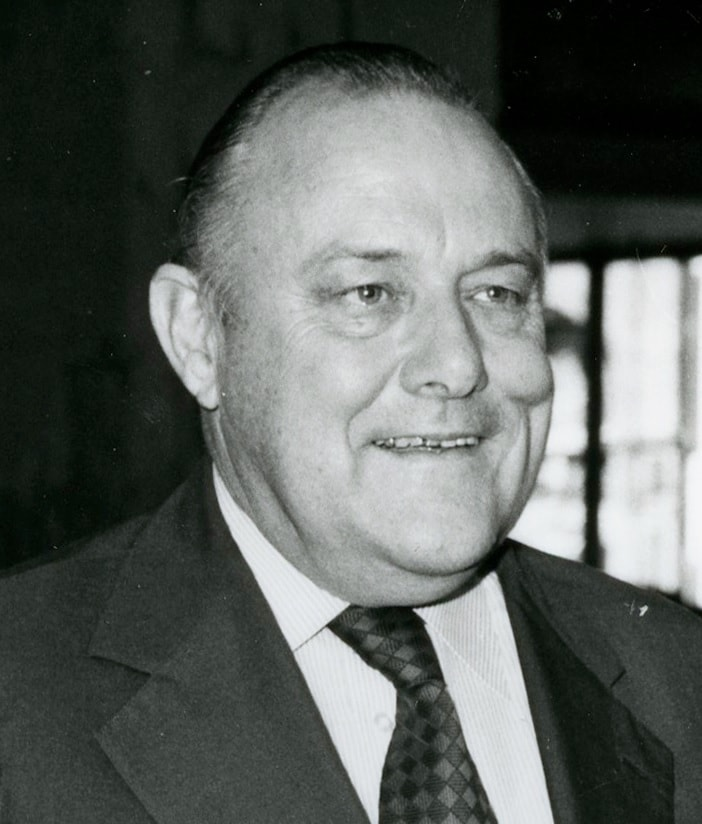
Robert Muldoon

The Moyle Affair was a political scandal that took place in New Zealand in 1976. It involved allegations of homosexuality made in Parliament by Prime Minister Robert Muldoon against opposition MP Colin Moyle. The allegations resulted in a commission of inquiry into Moyle, culminating with his resignation from Parliament.

== Background ==
Around 11pm on 17 June 1975, Minister of Agriculture Colin Moyle invited an undercover plainclothes policeman to get into his car outside in a Wellington street. No charges were ever brought against Moyle. What happened eventually became the subject of parliamentary rumour that circulated for more than a year before being brought into the open by Prime Minister Robert Muldoon. Homosexual activity between men was illegal in New Zealand at the time. By this time Muldoon had already created a public rift with the LGBT community in New Zealand over his handling of the "outing" of National MP Marilyn Waring as a lesbian in August 1976.

== Events ==
=== 4 November 1976 ===
Rt. Hon. R. D. MULDOON: I shall forgive the effeminate giggles of the member for Mangere because I know his background too.
Mr SPEAKER (Sir Roy Jack): Order! I think the term effeminate giggles is not an acceptable one, and it must be withdrawn.
Rt. Hon. R. D. MULDOON: Yes, I shall withdraw it.
HON. C. J. MOYLE: A point of order, Mr Speaker. Would it be in order for an honourable member in this House to accuse the Prime Minister of being a member of an accountancy firm that did things that were dishonest?
Rt. Hon. R. D. MULDOON: Would be in order if it is in order for me to accuse the member for Mangere of being picked up by the police for homosexual activity.
HON. C. J. MOYLE: A point of order, Mr Speaker.
Mr SPEAKER: Order! I am amazed at the level we are moving into.
HON. C. J. MOYLE: That is a lie; that is an absolute lie.

— Transcript of the incident in Hansard

During a debate in parliament on 4 November 1976 Moyle criticised the integrity of Muldoon's Auckland accountancy firm to which Muldoon counterpunched with an accusation against Moyle of having been 'picked up' by the police the previous year on suspicion of homosexual activities. Muldoon asked in Parliament if it "would be in order for me to accuse the member for Mangere of being picked up by the police for homosexual activity". To which Moyle said this was an absolute lie. In response Labour leader Bill Rowling led a walkout of Labour MPs in protest to the accusation. Muldoon had previously in the same debate remarked on Moyle's "effeminate giggles". However these were later revealed to be from Onehunga MP Frank Rogers.

A group of Labour MPs and party officials had coincidentally had been planning an attempt to replace Rowling as leader with Moyle, one of the better performing ministers in the previous Labour government. Many speculated that Muldoon saw the affable, popular Moyle as a leadership threat to himself and acted accordingly to prevent him from becoming Labour leader. Muldoon's behaviour was also attributed to the influence of alcohol with both National Party Director Barrie Leay and Labour MP Richard Prebble claiming in a 1994 interview that Muldoon had been drinking heavily before arriving in the debating chamber that night.

=== 5 November 1976 ===
The next day Muldoon claimed to know about a police file that justified his accusations and he went to the acting Commissioner of Police Bob Walton, and asked to see the file they had on Moyle. Walton then sought the advice of a crown law officer who said not to disclose the file, much to Muldoon's annoyance. Despite never seeing what was on the file Muldoon implied later on to the media that he had and even threatened to table its contents.

When the House resumed the next day, Moyle said "the allegation concerning me made by the Prime Minister in Parliament last night is absolutely untrue. It is as unfounded as it is malicious ... At no time in my life have I ever been arrested, apprehended or picked up by the police for any action, any happening or any crime or misdemeanour of any sort".

=== Reaction ===
The Social Credit Party leader Bruce Beetham said "Labour MPs were enjoying baiting the bull but Moyle got gored ... Labour were dishing it out but they were the first to cry foul if someone hit them back." Auckland newspaper The New Zealand Herald conducted a poll of readers and found that over 61% disapproved of Muldoon's behaviour and inferences. Additionally the paper received a clear majority of letters to the editor that were unfavourable of Muldoon and his actions.

Many National MPs were outraged by Muldoon's accusation and Muldoon was questioned on the matter in caucus. Younger MPs such as Derek Quigley and Jim McLay were particularly critical of the incident. Muldoon defended himself to caucus stating "You have to remember the House is an intimate chamber. Its unwritten rule is that if someone boots you, boot back then or later". Muldoon was able to defuse caucus concerns and party anger.

Former Prime Minister and Muldoon's predecessor as National Party leader Jack Marshall had initially been reticent on his successor's activities, though he became publicly more critical of Muldoon's aggressive personality with time. He was interviewed on television about the incident in which he criticised Muldoon's behaviour stating "I think anyone who indulges in this kind of conduct is damaging himself and lowering the status of Parliament".

=== Commission of inquiry ===
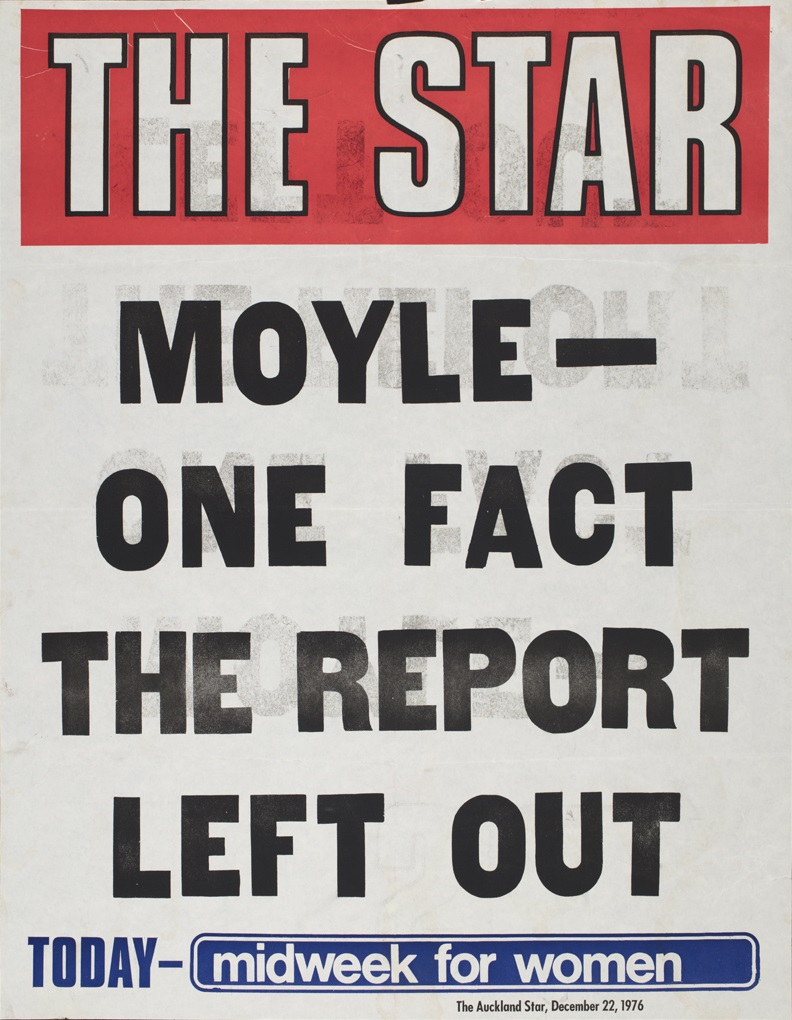
Newspaper headlines about the inquiry captivated public attention

Rowling called for an inquiry into the events. He was particularly concerned with how knowledge of the alleged events became known to Muldoon after Commissioner of Police Ken Burnside confirmed that the file they had regarding Moyle had neither been viewed by an unauthorised person nor the Prime Minister or Minister of Police. He stated "... it is clear that somehow something got into circulation and someone must be responsible". A commission of inquiry into Muldoon's accusations was convened and led by Sir Alfred Kingsley North, a retired Appeal Court judge. North was criticised for denying Moyle the right of legal representation during the inquiry proceedings.

The inquiry found that Moyle altered his account of the events three times:

- Moyle told Parliament that, having heard of a spate of burglaries in the city, he had stopped the plainclothes policeman because he suspected he was a burglar.
- Moyle told the acting commander of the Wellington police district that he was meeting homosexuals in order to prepare for a debate in Parliament about the treatment of homosexuals.
- In a third explanation, when questioned by North, he said he had arranged to meet a person with information about security leaks which allegedly implicated the Deputy Commissioner of Police.

North criticised Moyle for offering varying explanations to the House concluding "I am of the opinion that the belated attempt by Mr. Moyle to present a totally new explanation for his conduct that night was unwise and was bound to fail."

It was later discovered that the inquiry was constitutionally flawed. The Prime Minister had set up an inquiry to examine a statement to Parliament by an MP without any resolution of the House. Therefore, the inquiry should not have been allowed to examine what had been said in the House. As Moyle had been denied a defence he did not have any lawyers to notice and argue this case. This refusal of legal defence for him was also criticised.

=== Resignation ===
Moyle posted his resignation from Parliament on Christmas Eve 1976, after the publication of North's report. He later said that he had not been obliged to resign, but had done so because "the whole thing just made me sick". Initially, Moyle intended to stand for re-election in his constituency in order to vindicate himself, however he was persuaded not to do so by Rowling. Moyle did decide to withdraw his nomination on 12 February only three days before the selection meeting. A voice-choked Moyle gave an emotional press conference where he explained that the media scrutiny was unbearable on both him and his family and he wished to put his family first by sparing them further press intrusions by not standing again.

== Outcomes ==
Muldoon's impugning of Moyle has been widely regarded as the "low point of parliamentary mudslinging" in New Zealand history. In a 1990 interview, Moyle said that the scandal had made him a "sadder and wiser person". The head of the prime minister's department, Gerald Hensley, wrote that Muldoon had later told him that his accusation against Moyle was the thing he most regretted in his life.

Rowling's handling of the Moyle affair was subject to criticism. His approach was regarded by many as unnecessarily heavy-handed. Rowling himself insisted that Moyle, a close friend of his, must resign. In response a large crowd protested outside the 1977 Labour Party Conference and many in New Zealand's LGBT community never forgave him. In 2018 former Labour MP Mel Courtney stated that "Rowling's handling of the Moyle 'affair' in 1977 by asking Colin Moyle to resign in response to Rob Muldoon's attacks in parliament was wrong" in a submission to parliament regarding a proposed electoral integrity law.

The subsequent 1977 by-election was won by David Lange, and the attention that this got him helped propel him to the leadership of the Labour Party and his landslide victory over Muldoon in the 1984 election.

=== Popular culture ===
In 1998 Wellington author James McNeish, who previously had written a controversial bestseller on the Bain family murders, wrote a drama around events that led to Moyle resigning from Parliament titled Thursday Bloody Thursday. McNeish said "The incident is bigger than Colin Moyle ... the point of the play is about the inquiry and how Muldoon was able to destroy a man". Moyle said a year later he had not seen it but he knew McNeish "was doing something but I wasn't very interested in it. It doesn't really have much meaning in today's scheme of things."
