= Robert Anderson (New Zealand politician) =

New Zealand politician

Member of the New Zealand Parliament for Kaimai
- In office 15 August 1987 – 12 October 1996
- Preceded by: Bruce Townshend
- Succeeded by: Electorate abolished

Personal details
- Born: 22 January 1936 Epsom, England
- Died: 24 October 1996 (aged 60) Mount Maunganui, New Zealand
- Party: National

Robert Arnold Anderson (22 January 1936 – 24 October 1996) was a New Zealand politician. He was a National Party MP from 1987 to 1996.

== Biography ==
Anderson was born in Epsom, England, on 22 January 1936, and educated in England and Southern Rhodesia. He was a local board chairman from 1983 to 1987 and a member of the Local Government Commission.

He was first elected to Parliament in the 1987 election as MP for Kaimai, replacing the deceased Bruce Townshend. He beat former National Party President Sue Wood for selection in the seat. In 1990 he was appointed as Deputy Chairman of Committees during the first term of the Fourth National Government.

He left Parliament at the 1996 election. He had been selected as National candidate for the new seat of Coromandel which replaced Kaimai, but withdrew due to illness (cancer). He was replaced by Murray McLean, who won the seat in 1996, but lost in the 1999 election.

Anderson was awarded the New Zealand 1990 Commemoration Medal. He died at Mount Maunganui on 24 October 1996.

New Zealand Parliament
Years	Term	Electorate	Party
1987–1990	42nd	Kaimai	National
1990–1993	43rd	Kaimai	National
1993–1996	44th	Kaimai	National

== Citations ==
New Zealand Parliament
Preceded by Bruce Townshend	Member of Parliament for Kaimai; 1987–1996	Constituency abolished
Political offices
Preceded by Trevor Young	Deputy Chairman of Committees; 1990–1993	Succeeded by Joy McLauchlan
