= Grahame Thorne =

New Zealand politician

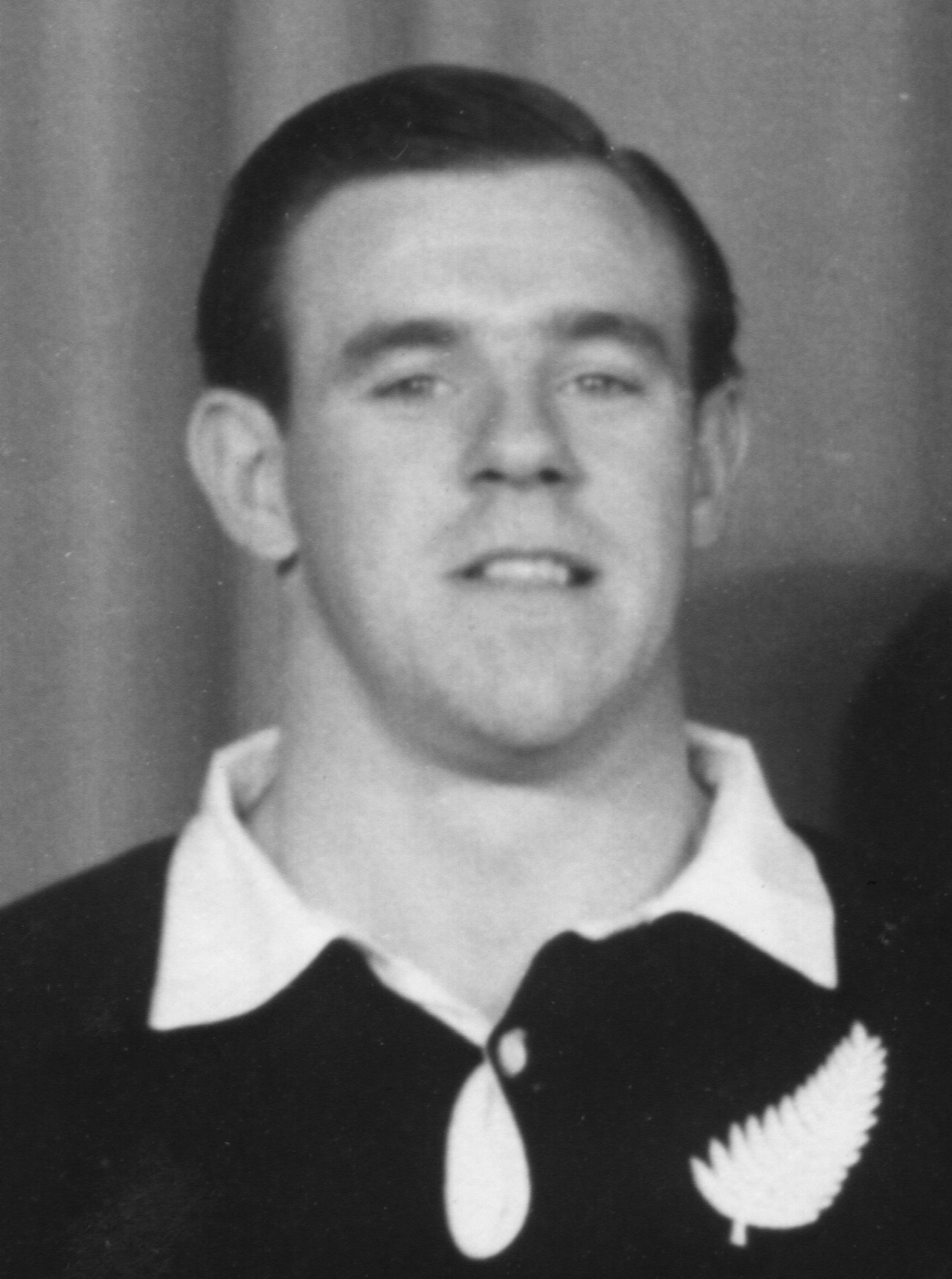
- Born: Grahame Stuart Thorne; 25 February 1946 (age 80) Auckland, New Zealand
- Height: 1.78 m (5 ft 10 in)
- Weight: 83 kg (183 lb)
- School: Auckland Grammar School
- University: University of Auckland

Rugby union career
- Position: Second five-eighth, centre
Provincial / State sides
Years	Team	Apps	(Points)
1968–70, 74	Auckland	23	
-	Northern Transvaal		
-	Natal		
International career
Years	Team	Apps	(Points)
1967–70	New Zealand	10	(3)

Grahame Stuart Thorne (born 25 February 1946) is a former All Black rugby player, rugby union commentator, Member of Parliament and municipal councillor and TV cooking show host. He was born in Auckland, New Zealand.

== Rugby union ==
A centre, wing, and second five-eighth, Thorne represented Auckland at a provincial level, and was a member of the New Zealand national side, the All Blacks, from 1967 to 1970. He played 39 matches for the All Blacks including 10 internationals. In the early 1970s he lived in South Africa and played for Northern Transvaal and Natal. In 2014, he featured on a list of the top 100 All Blacks. While in Auckland, Thorne initially played for the Auckland University Rugby Club and later for the Pakuranga United Club.

Thorne's sons Bruce and David also played rugby union: Bruce played in South Africa for Transvaal and the Junior Springboks; and David played club rugby in Nelson, New Zealand.

== Sports broadcasting career ==
After his playing career, Thorne worked as a sports commentator for Television New Zealand, often appearing alongside Keith Quinn.

== Member of Parliament ==
New Zealand Parliament
Years	Term	Electorate	Party
1990–1993	43rd	Onehunga	National

Thorne was the National Party Member of Parliament for Onehunga in the 43rd parliament from the 1990 election to 1993. The seat had been held by Labour since the 1938 election.

== Local government ==
After his parliamentary career Thorne held local government roles as an elected councillor of Onehunga Borough Council, Auckland City Council, Auckland Regional Council, Nelson City Council (2004); was an unsuccessful candidate for Christchurch City Council in 2007 then was an unsuccessful candidate for Queenstown Lakes District Council in 2010. Thorne described his unsuccessful Christchurch candidacy as due to "not thinking clearly at the time" but that he had generally "given [his] best when elected to public office."

== Cooking shows ==
Thorne has had two cooking shows on New Zealand TV; Thorney's Cooking Canterbury and Thorney's Cooking Central, both produced by his son Gareth.

== Personal life ==
Thorne was adopted at birth in an adoption privately arranged by his grandfather. He described learning of his adoption at age 21 as "a devastating experience." He has married twice, with one son born to his first (South African) wife and four children to his second (New Zealand) wife.

Thorne's family life was beset by tragedy. His son David had a spinal injury and stroke following a hard rugby tackle in a club rugby game in Nelson in 2006, and underwent long recuperation at Burwood Hospital. The care of his son distracted Thorne from his local government duties and he was criticised for refusing to resign.

Thorne's son Bruce died when his four wheel drive vehicle overturned near Bloemfontein in South Africa in December 2009. Thorne struggled with grief and alcohol consumption following the accident.

=== Encounters with Police ===
In 2015 Thorne reappeared in Queenstown District Court to challenge the validity of an infringement notice he received for overtaking vehicles on the left on a single carriageway. He was ordered to pay a fine and court costs.

New Zealand Parliament
Preceded by Fred Gerbic	Member of Parliament for Onehunga; 1990–1993	Succeeded by Richard Northey
Political offices
New constituency	Auckland City Councillor for Maungakiekie Ward; 1989–1991	Succeeded by Ken Graham
