= Barrie Hutchinson =

New Zealand rugby union and water polo player (1926–2019)

Personal information
- Full name: John Barrie Skilbeck Hutchinson
- Born: 19 June 1926
- Died: 14 February 2019 (aged 92)

Sport
- Country: New Zealand
- Sport: Water polo
Medal record
Men's water polo
Representing New Zealand
British Empire Games
Silver medal – second place	1950 Auckland	Water polo

John Barrie Skilbeck Hutchinson (19 June 1926 – 14 February 2019) was a New Zealand rugby union and water polo player.

At the 1950 British Empire Games he won the silver medal as part of the men's water polo team.

As well as playing water polo he was involved in rugby. He played for and captained the Wellington and Auckland rugby teams, as well as playing in All Blacks trial teams. He was also a rugby coach and served as president of the Auckland Rugby Football Union.

He spent six years as an Auckland City Councillor, and worked in real estate. At the 1978 general election, Hutchinson unsuccessfully contested the Onehunga electorate for the National Party, losing to the incumbent Labour MP, Frank Rogers, by 1417 votes.

Hutchinson died on 14 February 2019.
