= Acting prime minister =

Cabinet member serving as prime minister

An acting prime minister is a member of a cabinet (often in Westminster system countries) who is serving in the role of prime minister, whilst the individual who normally holds the position is unable to do so. The role is often performed by the deputy prime minister (where that position exists), or by another senior minister.

The office is commonly used when the prime minister is absent from the territory of that nation or when the prime minister is unable to perform duties for health reasons.

The position of acting prime minister may be distinguished from that of caretaker prime minister (typically referring to an outgoing prime minister following an electoral defeat and who by convention does not implement new policies) and interim prime minister (who is appointed to perform a similar role to a caretaker prime minister).

== By country ==
=== Australia ===
According to House of Representatives Practice, an official publication of the Parliament of Australia, the Prime Minister of Australia "may make temporary ministerial arrangements without reference to the Governor-General. A Minister may act for another Minister on account of absence from Australia or from the Ministry or due to ill health. The Acts Interpretation Act confers upon an Acting Minister the same power and authority with respect to the absent Minister's statutory responsibilities."

The position of acting prime minister is a special case of an acting minister, and generally occurs when the prime minister is travelling overseas, is on vacation, or is in ill health. In the early 20th century, when travel by ship was still the norm, it was not uncommon for there to be an acting prime minister for months on end.

The deputy prime minister is usually designated as the acting prime minister, although another senior member of the government may fill the role if both the prime minister and deputy prime minister are unavailable. An acting prime minister is required quite frequently – for instance, between 3 December 2007 and 23 February 2009 (during Kevin Rudd's first term), Julia Gillard acted as prime minister on 16 separate occasions.

The term acting prime minister is sometimes also applied to someone who is temporarily appointed prime minister following a death in office (more commonly called a caretaker prime minister or an interim prime minister). Examples include Frank Forde (seven days following John Curtin's death), Earle Page (19 days following Joseph Lyons' death), and John McEwen (22 days following Harold Holt's disappearance).

Unlike those who merely acted in the absence of a prime minister, Forde, Page and McEwen were officially commissioned by the governor general and took the oath of office; they are considered prime ministers in their own right.

=== Canada ===
In Canada, the deputy prime minister—a position that is not always in use—becomes acting head of government in the event that the prime minister is absent from Canada or incapacitated. Prior to the creation of the deputy prime minister position, acting prime ministers were routinely appointed when prime ministers were temporarily away from their duties; however, prime ministers typically appointed a different cabinet member each time, rather than designating one specific person as a permanent official "deputy".

In February 1958, Prime Minister John Diefenbaker appointed Ellen Fairclough as acting prime minister for two days while he was absent from his duties; Fairclough was historically noteworthy as the first woman ever given the duty.

=== China ===
After the death of Zhou Enlai, the first Premier of the State Council, then Vice Premier Hua Guofeng served as acting premier of the State Council. Hua Guofeng became Premier of the State Council after serving as acting premier of the State Council for two months.

After Zhao Ziyang resigned as Premier of the State Council to the Standing Committee of the National People's Congress in November 1987, then Vice Premier Li Peng became acting premier. Li Peng later formally became premier in April 1988.

=== India ===
In 1964 after the death of Jawaharlal Nehru, the first prime minister of India, then minister of home affairs Gulzarilal Nanda served as the acting prime minister for thirteen days, till the appointment of Lal Bahadur Shastri as prime minister.

In 1966 Nanda again served as the acting prime minister for thirteen days after the death of Shastri, the second prime minister of India, till the appointment of Indira Gandhi as prime minister.

=== Israel ===
The designated acting prime minister takes the role of prime minister as acting prime minister, for up to one hundred consecutive days, if the incumbent is temporarily incapacitated. Whilst in other countries the term "Acting Prime Minister" only refers to an individual actually performing the role, in Israel the term is also in use when a designated Minister is allocated, even if they never actually perform the role.

=== New Zealand ===
In New Zealand, the acting prime minister is the designated head of government when the incumbent is not available to fulfill their duties. This includes when the prime minister is overseas, unwell, or otherwise temporarily unavailable. Typically this position is filled by the Deputy Prime Minister. Hugh Watt, who was then the deputy prime minister, served as acting prime minister for six days, after Norman Kirk died in office in 1974.

Deputy Prime Minister Winston Peters was serving as acting prime minister as of 21 June 2018 until 2 August 2018, while Jacinda Ardern took maternity leave.

Prior to the establishment of the deputy prime minister role, a senior minister would be appointed to act as prime minister when, for example, the incumbent was travelling overseas. In the current era, when both the prime minister and deputy prime minister are unavailable, the next highest-ranking minister who is available will be asked to act as prime minister, until a colleague of higher rank is available again.

=== Sri Lanka ===
In Sri Lanka, an acting prime minister is a senior minister appointed to take the role of prime minister in the absence of the incumbent. Wijeyananda Dahanayake was appointed acting prime minister on September 26, 1959 following the assassination of S. W. R. D. Bandaranaike. He was subsequently confirmed as prime minister by parliament.

=== United Kingdom ===
In the UK, nobody has the right of automatic succession to the prime ministership. However, it is generally considered by those with an interest in the matter that in the event of the death of the prime minister, it would be appropriate to appoint an interim prime minister, though there is some debate as to how to decide who this should be. This role is distinct to the Deputy Prime Minister of the United Kingdom, a ceremonial role for when the prime minister is temporarily indisposed for an engagement.

According to Rodney Brazier, there are no procedures within government to cope with the sudden death of the prime minister. There is also no such title as acting prime minister of the United Kingdom. Despite refusing "...to discuss a hypothetical situation" with BBC News in 2011, the Cabinet Office is said to have said in 2006:

There is no single protocol setting out all of the possible implications. However, the general constitutional position is as set out below. There can be no automatic assumption about who The Queen would ask to act as caretaker Prime Minister in the event of the death of the Prime Minister. The decision is for her under the Royal Prerogative. However, there are some key guiding principles. The Queen would probably be looking for a very senior member of the Government (not necessarily a Commons Minister since this would be a short-term appointment). If there was a recognized deputy to the Prime Minister, used to acting on his behalf in his absences, this could be an important factor. Also important would be the question of who was likely to be in contention to take over long-term as Prime Minister. If the most senior member of the Government was him or herself a contender for the role of Prime Minister, it might be that The Queen would invite a slightly less senior non-contender. In these circumstances, her private secretary would probably take soundings, via the Cabinet Secretary, of members of the Cabinet, to ensure that The Queen invited someone who would be acceptable to the Cabinet to act as their chair during the caretaker period. Once the Party had elected a new leader, that person would, of course, be invited to take over as Prime Minister.

Additionally, when the prime minister is travelling, it is standard practice for a senior duty minister to be appointed who can attend to urgent business and meetings if required, though the prime minister remains in charge and updated throughout.

On 6 April 2020, then First Secretary of State, Dominic Raab, deputised for Prime Minister Boris Johnson following his admittance to hospital with COVID-19 and remained in post until 26 April. Raab was often dubbed the acting or stand-in prime minister during this time, but he never officially held that title, and Johnson legally remained in office. There were calls to formalise the role.

== See also ==
- Acting president
