= Neville Young =

New Zealand lawyer and politician (1940–2019)

Neville Young CNZM

10th President of the National Party
- In office 1986–1989
- Preceded by: Sue Wood
- Succeeded by: John Collinge

Personal details
- Born: Neville Garde Austen Young; 11 December 1940 Christchurch, New Zealand
- Died: 9 February 2019 (aged 78) Hamilton, New Zealand
- Party: National
- Spouse: Valerie May McKinnon (m. 1971)
- Relations: William Young (brother)
- Children: 2
- Education: University of Canterbury
- Occupation: Barrister and solicitor

Neville Garde Austen Young CNZM (11 December 1940 – 9 February 2019) was a New Zealand lawyer. He served as president of the National Party from 1986 to 1989.

== Early life and family ==
Born in Christchurch on 11 December 1940, Young was educated at Christ's College from 1955 to 1959, and went on to study law at the University of Canterbury. He was the older brother of jurist William Young. In 1971, Neville Young married Valerie May McKinnon, and the couple went on to have two children.

== Political career ==
Young was elected president of the National Party in 1986 after Sue Wood stood down from the role, and remained in office until 1989, when he was challenged and defeated by John Collinge. Subsequently, Young was not actively involved in the National Party at a senior level.

== Professional career ==
A barrister and solicitor, Young was a partner in the law firm Young Hunter and Co, and from the early 1970s he was a professional trustee. In 1998, he was appointed chair of the Earthquake Commission, and in 1999, he was appointed as a member of the New Zealand Fire Service Commission. He also served as a member of the board of trustees of the National Provident Fund. In 2004, Young was appointed as a member of the rulings panel of the Electricity Commission, to deal with formal complaints of breaches of electricity governance regulations in New Zealand.

== Honours and awards ==
In 1990, Young was awarded the New Zealand 1990 Commemoration Medal. In the 2007 Queen's Birthday Honours, he was appointed a Companion of the New Zealand Order of Merit, for services to business. In the same honours list, his brother, William, was made a Distinguished Companion of the New Zealand Order of Merit.

== Death ==
Young died at Waikato Hospital, Hamilton, on 9 February 2019.

Party political offices
Preceded by Sue Wood	President of the National Party; 1986–1989	Succeeded by John Collinge
