= 1980 Northern Maori by-election =

New Zealand by-election

- 7 June 1980
- Turnout: 6,831 (41.38%)

Candidate	Bruce Gregory	Matiu Rata	Joe Toia
Party	Labour	Mana Motuhake	Social Credit
Popular vote	3,580	2,589	560
Percentage	52.41	37.90	8.20
Member before election
Matiu Rata
Labour
Elected Member
Bruce Gregory
Labour

The Northern Maori by-election of 1980 was a by-election for the Northern Maori electorate during the 39th New Zealand Parliament. It was prompted on 29 April by the resignation of Matiu Rata, a former member of the Labour Party who was establishing a new group, Mana Motuhake. Rata believed that contesting a by-election would give him a mandate for his change of allegiance. In the end, however, his plan backfired when the seat was won by Bruce Gregory, his replacement as the Labour Party candidate.

It was held the same day as another by-election in Onehunga.

== Candidates ==
=== Labour Party ===
As Northern Maori was a safe Labour seat, having held it since 1938 election, there was a large amount of interest in the candidacy. The sheer geographic size of the electorate also caused interest from candidates to be spread widely, Northern Maori stretched from Cape Reinga in the north to Panmure in the south.

A total of 11 candidates were nominated:

- John Antonio, a social worker from Mission Bay
- Rameka Cope, a community officer from Hokianga
- Ivan Erstich, a truck driver from Kaitaia
- Dr Bruce Gregory, a general practitioner from Kaitaia
- Laly Haddon, a former Māori All Black
- Te Kairarahi Hui, a Maori welfare officer from Auckland
- Hemi Kingi, a teacher from Hamilton
- Peter Love, a marketing consultant from Auckland who was previously a candidate for the National Party
- Bertram McLean, a naval officer from Auckland
- Jon Matthews, a schoolteacher from Kaitaia
- William Rawiri, a branch manager from Tinopai

The selection process was completed on 4 May, where Bruce Gregory was selected.

=== Mana Motuhake ===
After becoming dissatisfied with the Labour Party's Māori policies Matiu Rata had begun to lose the confidence of his colleagues. Eventually he was deposed as chairman of Labour's Maori Affairs committee and removed from Labour's front bench, prompting him to resign from the party. He then formed his own party, Mana Motuhake which would advocate for Maori self-determination. To help in the establishment of the party, Rata sought a by-election to gain voter approval for his new party and its agenda.

=== Social Credit ===
Anticipating that Rata would force a by-election, the Social Credit Party selected Joe Toia, a Dargaville forestry foreman, in March 1980. Toia was the Māori representative on the party's dominion council and had contested the seat at the last three elections. Toia was previously a Labour Party member and had been beaten by Rata for the Labour nomination at the 1963 Northern Maori by-election.

=== Others ===
The National Party did not contest the election, a decision that was criticised by Social Credit deputy-leader Jeremy Dwyer as "chickening out". The Values Party decided not to stand a candidate in Northern Maori. Party leader Margaret Crozier endorsed Rata, saying that Values agreed with his aim for Maori self-determination which was already part of Values Party policy. Wallace Hetaraka, a carver and craft shop owner, stood for the Cheer Up Party (a joke party).

== Results ==
The following table gives the election results:

1980 Northern Maori by-election
Party	Candidate	Votes	%	±%
Labour	Bruce Gregory	3,580	52.41	
Mana Motuhake	Matiu Rata	2,589	37.90	
Social Credit	Joe Toia	560	8.20	
Cheer Up	Wallace Hetaraka	80	1.17	
Christian Democratic	Tom Weal	13	0.19	
Reform Party	P Te W Warner	9	0.13	
Majority		991	14.51	
Turnout		6,831	41.38	
Labour hold		Swing		
