= 1953 Onehunga by-election =

New Zealand by-election

← 1951 general	19 December 1953	1954 general →
- Turnout: 13,749 (63.48%)
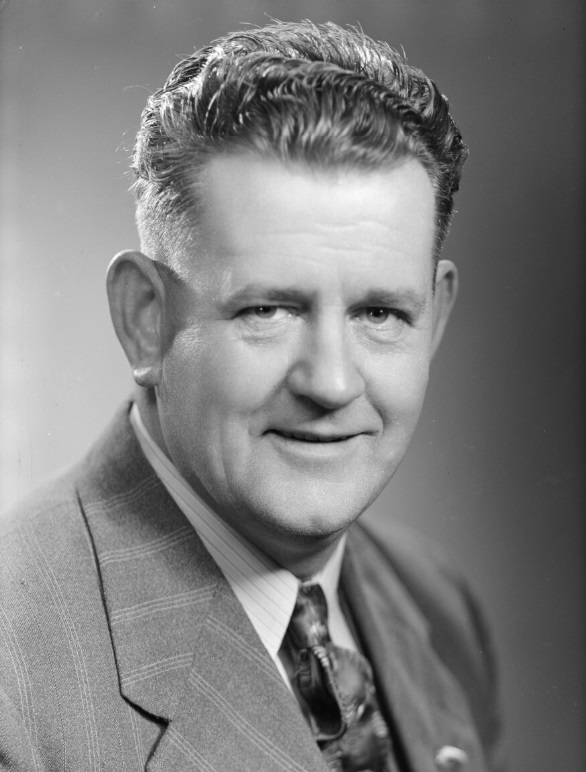

Candidate	Hugh Watt	Leonard Bradley
Party	Labour	National
Popular vote	6,868	3,385
Percentage	66.99%	33.01%
Member before election
Arthur Osborne
Labour
Elected Member
Hugh Watt
Labour

The Onehunga by-election 1953 was a by-election held in the Onehunga electorate in Auckland during the term of the 30th New Zealand Parliament, on 19 December 1953. The by-election was won by Hugh Watt of the Labour Party.

== Background ==
The by-election was caused by the death of incumbent MP Arthur Osborne of the Labour Party on 15 November 1953. In early November 1953 Osborne announced that he was not seeking re-election and would retire at the 1954 general election due to ill health. As a result, Labour had already begun preparations to replace him in the electorate at the time of Osborne's death.

== Candidates ==
Labour
There were two nominations for the Labour Party nomination:

- Martyn Finlay, an Auckland lawyer and former MP for North Shore (1946–1949)
- Hugh Watt, a local engineering business owner and chairman of the Onehunga Labour Representation Committee

The chairman of the Auckland Labour Representation Committee, Richard French "Dick" Barter, was also speculated as a candidate but he did not seek the nomination. The Labour Party selected Watt as their candidate at a selection meeting on 30 November. He had stood unsuccessfully for Labour in Remuera in 1949 election and in Parnell in 1951 election. A month earlier he had been elected to the Auckland Harbour Board for the Onehunga, Newmarket and combined district.

National
Leonard George Bradley was selected as the National Party candidate. Bradley had contested Onehunga in the previous general election in 1951 against Osborne where he slightly increased National's share of the vote. At the 1949 election he had stood unsuccessfully for National in Auckland Central.

== Results ==
The following table gives the election results:

1953 Onehunga by-election
Party	Candidate	Votes	%	±%
Labour	Hugh Watt	6,868	66.99	
National	Leonard Bradley	3,385	33.01	−10.01
Informal votes		13	0.13	
Majority		3,483	33.97	
Turnout		13,749	63.48	−23.51
Registered electors		16,171		
Labour hold		Swing		

== Aftermath ==
Watt represented the electorate until he retired at the 1975 election. Bradley stood for National in Otahuhu in 1954 election and Waitakere in 1957 election, but was unsuccessful.
