= Shadow Cabinet of Mike Moore =

New Zealand shadow cabinet (1990–1993)

New Zealand political leader Mike Moore assembled a shadow cabinet system amongst the Labour caucus following his change of position to Leader of the Opposition in 1990. He composed this of individuals who acted for the party as spokespeople in assigned roles while he was the leader (1990–93).

As the Labour Party formed the largest party not in government, the frontbench team was as a result the Official Opposition of the New Zealand House of Representatives.

== List of shadow ministers ==
Portfolio	Minister	Start	End
Leader	Mike Moore	2 November 1990	1 December 1993
Deputy Leader	Helen Clark	2 November 1990	1 December 1993
Agriculture	Jack Elder	27 November 1990	1 December 1993
Attorney-General	David Lange	27 November 1990	1 December 1993
Defence	Peter Tapsell	27 November 1990	1 December 1993
Education	Margaret Austin	27 November 1990	1 December 1993
Finance	David Caygill	27 November 1990	5 December 1991
Finance	Michael Cullen	5 December 1991	1 December 1993
Foreign Affairs	Mike Moore	27 November 1990	1 December 1993
Health	Helen Clark	27 November 1990	1 December 1993
Internal Affairs	Peter Tapsell	27 November 1990	1 December 1993
Justice	David Lange	27 November 1990	5 December 1991
Justice	David Caygill	5 December 1991	1 December 1993
Labour	Helen Clark	27 November 1990	1 December 1993
Maori Affairs	Koro Wētere	27 November 1990	1 December 1993
Revenue	Peter Dunne	27 November 1990	1 December 1993
Social Welfare	Michael Cullen	27 November 1990	5 December 1991
Social Welfare	Clive Matthewson	5 December 1991	1 December 1993
State Owned Enterprises	Richard Prebble	27 November 1990	1 December 1993
Tourism	Fran Wilde	27 November 1990	27 January 1993
Tourism	Chris Laidlaw	27 January 1993	1 December 1993
Trade	Mike Moore	27 November 1990	27 January 1993
Trade	Jack Elder	27 January 1993	1 December 1993
Transport	Geoff Braybrooke	27 November 1990	1 December 1993
Works	Richard Prebble	27 November 1990	1 December 1993

== Frontbench teams ==
When Labour held their first post-election caucus the results of several seats were still subject to recounts thusly portfolios were not allocated until the membership of the caucus was confirmed. The meeting elected Jonathan Hunt and Elizabeth Tennet as whips and Jack Elder as caucus secretary.

The list below contains a list of Moore's spokespeople and their respective roles:

=== First iteration ===
Moore announced his first lineup on 27 November 1990.

Rank	Shadow Minister	Portfolio/s
1	Rt Hon Mike Moore	Leader of the Opposition; Shadow Minister of Foreign Affairs; Shadow Minister of Trade
2	Rt Hon Helen Clark	Deputy Leader of the Opposition; Shadow Minister of Health; Shadow Minister of Labour
3	Hon David Caygill	Shadow Minister of Finance
4	Hon Richard Prebble	Shadow Minister of State Owned Enterprises; Shadow Minister of Works; Shadow Minister of Police; Shadow Minister of Pacific Island Affairs
5	Hon Michael Cullen	Shadow Minister of Social Welfare; Shadow Minister of ACC; Shadow Minister of Pensions
6	Hon Koro Wētere	Shadow Minister of Maori Affairs
7	Hon Dr Peter Tapsell	Shadow Minister of Defence; Shadow Minister of Internal Affairs; Shadow Minister of Racing; Shadow Minister of Sport and Recreation
8	Hon Fran Wilde	Shadow Minister of Tourism; Shadow Minister of Disarmament
9	Rt Hon Jonathan Hunt	Senior Whip; Shadow Minister of Housing; Shadow Leader of the House
10	Elizabeth Tennet	Shadow Minister of Employment; Junior Whip
11	Rt Hon David Lange	Shadow Minister of Justice; Shadow Attorney-General
12	Hon Clive Matthewson	Shadow Minister of Industries and Commerce; Shadow Minister of State Services
13	Hon Margaret Austin	Shadow Minister of Education
14	Hon Peter Dunne	Shadow Minister of Revenue; Shadow Minister for the Environment; Shadow Minister of Regional Development
15	Geoff Braybrooke	Shadow Minister of Transport; Shadow Minister for Disabilities
16	Jack Elder	Shadow Minister of Agriculture
17	Bruce Gregory	Shadow Minister of Lands
18	Hon Whetu Tirikatene-Sullivan	Shadow Minister of Youth Affairs; Shadow Minister of Family Affairs
19	Sonja Davies	Shadow Minister of Women's Affairs
20	Graham Kelly	Shadow Minister of Fisheries; Shadow Minister of Senior Citizens
21	Ross Robertson	Shadow Minister of Energy; Shadow Minister of Statistics
22	Larry Sutherland	Shadow Minister of Consumer Affairs; Shadow Minister of Civil Defense
23	John Blincoe	Shadow Minister of Conservation
24	Lianne Dalziel	Shadow Minister of Customs; Shadow Minister for the Audit Department
25	George Hawkins	Shadow Minister of Local Government; Shadow Minister of Urban Affairs
26	Pete Hodgson	Shadow Minister of Science and Technology; Shadow Minister of Planning
27	Steve Maharey	Shadow Minister of Broadcasting; Shadow Minister of Communications
28	Paul Swain	Shadow Minister of Forestry
29	Judith Tizard	Shadow Minister of Immigration; Shadow Minister of Arts & Culture

=== Second iteration ===
Moore announced a major reshuffle in December 1991.

Rank	Shadow Minister	Portfolio/s
1	Rt Hon Mike Moore	Leader of the Opposition; Shadow Minister of Foreign Affairs; Shadow Minister of Trade
2	Rt Hon Helen Clark	Deputy Leader of the Opposition; Shadow Minister of Health; Shadow Minister of Labour
3	Hon David Caygill	Shadow Minister of Justice; Shadow Minister of Energy
4	Hon Richard Prebble	Shadow Minister of State Owned Enterprises; Shadow Minister of Works; Shadow Minister of Police; Shadow Minister of Pacific Island Affairs
5	Hon Michael Cullen	Shadow Minister of Finance
6	Hon Koro Wētere	Shadow Minister of Maori Affairs
7	Hon Dr Peter Tapsell	Shadow Minister of Defence; Shadow Minister of Internal Affairs; Shadow Minister of Racing; Shadow Minister of Sport and Recreation
8	Hon Fran Wilde	Shadow Minister of Tourism; Shadow Minister of Disarmament; Shadow Minister of Ethnic Affairs
9	Rt Hon Jonathan Hunt	Senior Whip; Shadow Leader of the House
10	Elizabeth Tennet	Shadow Minister of Employment; Junior Whip
11	Rt Hon David Lange	Shadow Attorney-General
12	Hon Clive Matthewson	Shadow Minister of Social Welfare; Shadow Minister of State Services
13	Hon Margaret Austin	Shadow Minister of Education
14	Hon Peter Dunne	Shadow Minister of Commerce; Shadow Minister of Industry; Shadow Minister of Revenue
15	Geoff Braybrooke	Shadow Minister of Transport; Shadow Minister for Disabilities
16	Jack Elder	Shadow Minister of Agriculture
17	Bruce Gregory	Shadow Minister of Lands
18	Hon Whetu Tirikatene-Sullivan	Shadow Minister of Youth Affairs; Shadow Minister of Family Affairs
19	Sonja Davies	Shadow Minister of Women's Affairs
20	Graham Kelly	Shadow Minister of Fisheries; Shadow Minister of Senior Citizens
21	Ross Robertson	Shadow Minister of Business; Shadow Minister of Regional Development; Shadow Minister of Statistics
22	Larry Sutherland	Shadow Minister of Consumer Affairs; Shadow Minister of Civil Defense; Assistant Whip
23	John Blincoe	Shadow Minister of Conservation
24	Lianne Dalziel	Shadow Minister for ACC; Shadow Minister of Customs
25	George Hawkins	Shadow Minister of Urban Affairs; Shadow Minister of Local Government
26	Pete Hodgson	Shadow Minister of Science and Technology; Shadow Minister for the Environment
27	Steve Maharey	Shadow Minister of Broadcasting; Shadow Minister of Communications
28	Paul Swain	Shadow Minister of Housing; Shadow Minister of Forestry
29	Judith Tizard	Shadow Minister of Immigration; Shadow Minister of Arts & Culture

=== Third iteration ===
Moore announced a minor reshuffle of his shadow cabinet in January 1993 to accommodate Chris Laidlaw, after he won the Wellington Central by-election, replacing Fran Wilde who resigned from Parliament after she was elected Mayor of Wellington.

Rank	Shadow Minister	Portfolio/s
1	Rt Hon Mike Moore	Leader of the Opposition; Shadow Minister of Foreign Affairs
2	Rt Hon Helen Clark	Deputy Leader of the Opposition; Shadow Minister of Health; Shadow Minister of Labour
3	Hon David Caygill	Shadow Minister of Justice; Shadow Minister of Energy
4	Hon Richard Prebble	Shadow Minister of State Owned Enterprises; Shadow Minister of Works; Shadow Minister of Police; Shadow Minister of Pacific Island Affairs
5	Hon Michael Cullen	Shadow Minister of Finance
6	Hon Koro Wētere	Shadow Minister of Maori Affairs
7	Hon Dr Peter Tapsell	Shadow Minister of Defence; Shadow Minister of Internal Affairs; Shadow Minister of Racing; Shadow Minister of Sport and Recreation
8	Rt Hon Jonathan Hunt	Senior Whip; Shadow Leader of the House
9	Elizabeth Tennet	Shadow Minister of Employment; Junior Whip
10	Rt Hon David Lange	Shadow Attorney-General
11	Hon Clive Matthewson	Shadow Minister of Social Welfare; Shadow Minister of State Services
12	Hon Margaret Austin	Shadow Minister of Education
13	Hon Peter Dunne	Shadow Minister of Commerce; Shadow Minister of Industry; Shadow Minister of Revenue
14	Geoff Braybrooke	Shadow Minister of Transport; Shadow Minister for Disabilities
15	Jack Elder	Shadow Minister of Agriculture; Shadow Minister of Trade
16	Bruce Gregory	Shadow Minister of Lands
17	Hon Whetu Tirikatene-Sullivan	Shadow Minister of Youth Affairs; Shadow Minister of Family Affairs
18	Sonja Davies	Shadow Minister of Women's Affairs
19	Graham Kelly	Shadow Minister of Fisheries; Shadow Minister of Senior Citizens
20	Ross Robertson	Shadow Minister of Business; Shadow Minister of Regional Development; Shadow Minister of Statistics
21	Larry Sutherland	Shadow Minister of Consumer Affairs; Shadow Minister of Civil Defense; Assistant Whip
22	John Blincoe	Shadow Minister of Conservation
23	Lianne Dalziel	Shadow Minister for ACC; Shadow Minister of Customs
24	George Hawkins	Shadow Minister of Urban Affairs; Shadow Minister of Local Government
25	Steve Maharey	Shadow Minister of Broadcasting; Shadow Minister of Communications
26	Pete Hodgson	Shadow Minister of Science and Technology; Shadow Minister for the Environment
27	Paul Swain	Shadow Minister of Housing; Shadow Minister of Forestry
28	Judith Tizard	Shadow Minister of Immigration; Shadow Minister of Arts & Culture
29	Chris Laidlaw	Shadow Minister of Tourism; Shadow Minister of Disarmament; Shadow Minister of Ethnic Affairs
