= Bruce Gregory (politician) =

New Zealand politician

Bruce Craig Gregory (22 April 1937 – 29 October 2015) was a New Zealand politician of the Labour Party.

== Early life and career ==
Gregory was born in Kaingaroa in Northland to parents Vivian Lauder Gregory (Ngāi Tahu) and Tai Te Maru (Te Rarawa). He was educated at Pukepoto Native School, Kaitaia College and the University of Otago. He graduated with a Bachelor of Medicine and Bachelor of Surgery and practised medicine in Thames and Kaitaia. Notably, he was the first Māori general practitioner to work in Kaitaia.

He maintained an interest throughout his life in Māori art and musical instruments.

== Political career ==
New Zealand Parliament
Years	Term	Electorate	Party
1980–1981	39th	Northern Maori	Labour
1981–1984	40th	Northern Maori	Labour
1984–1987	41st	Northern Maori	Labour
1987–1990	42nd	Northern Maori	Labour
1990–1993	43rd	Northern Maori	Labour

Gregory was selected as the Labour Party candidate for the Northern Maori electorate in a 1980 by-election, caused by the resignation of the previous incumbent, Matiu Rata. Rata contested the by-election for the Mana Motuhake party but, ultimately, Gregory was successful. He was successful in each subsequent general election until 1993, when Tau Henare won Northern Maori for New Zealand First.

In 1983 he was appointed as Labour's spokesperson for Arts & Culture in the Lange shadow Cabinet. He was not appointed a minister in the Fourth Labour Government. In 1990 he became Labour's spokesperson for Lands in the Moore shadow Cabinet.

In 1990, Gregory was awarded the New Zealand 1990 Commemoration Medal.

Upon his defeat at the 1993 general election, Gregory returned to Kaitaia and continued his work in Māori health.

== Death ==
Gregory died on 29 October 2015.

== Notes ==
New Zealand Parliament
Preceded by Matiu Rata	Member of Parliament for Northern Maori; 1980–1993	Succeeded by Tau Henare
