= Paeroa College =

Secondary school in New Zealand

Location
- 15 Te Aroha Road; Paeroa 3300; New Zealand; 37.385617°S 175.669109°E

Information
- Funding type: State
- Motto: Mahi Tahi, Kia Kaha
- Established: 1958
- Ministry of Education Institution no.: 113
- Principal: Andrew Cameron
- Years offered: 9–13
- Gender: Coeducational
- Enrolment: 322 (July 2026)
- Houses: Ngakotu, Rapiri, Tara, Maru
- Colours: Green, Gold
- Socio-economic decile: 2
- Website: https://www.paeroacollege.school.nz/

Paeroa College is a state secondary school located in Paeroa, Waikato, New Zealand. The school has a roll of approximately 322 students from years 9 to 13 (approx ages 13 to 18) as of July 2026.

The school was precoursed by Paeroa District High School which originally began operation in 1902, roughly on the same site where Paeroa Central School is currently located. In 1910 the High School caught fire, burning the majority of the school, though some portions, including the 1903 'Juniors' block and a classroom located near Wood Street remained intact. In 1911, the schools roll consisted of 50 pupils, and by 1932 overcrowding became a significant issue facing the school, reaching a roll of 85 pupils. In 1940, the Auckland Education Board hired Lee Brothers, Builders via tender to begin construction on a new building located at the Colleges current site. This building still stands today as Paeroa College's "B Block," however refurbished from its original state in its early 2010's renovation. In 1958, the district high school transitioned into becoming a college, with an increasing roll of up to 255 students, and construction for multiple new buildings began, now known as, "A Block", "C Block" and "T (Technology) Block." By the early 60's the school gained a roll of nearly 350 students, with the current Assembely Hall developed by 1964, and later, the John Pullan Gymnasium in October of 1970.

== Enrolment ==
As of July 2026, Paeroa College has a roll of 322 students, of which 148 (46.0%) identify as Māori.

As of 2026, the school has an Equity Index of 507, placing it amongst schools whose students have many socioeconomic barriers to achievement.

== Notable alumni ==
- Ruth Aitken – former head coach of the Silver Ferns and student.
- Dick Hubbard - former mayor of Auckland City and student.
- Bruce Townshend - former National Party Member of the New Zealand House of Representatives for Kaimai (electorate) (1978-1987) and student.
- Ronald Algie - former Minister of Education, Speaker of the House of Representatives, National Party Member of the New Zealand House of Representatives for Remuera (electorate), and Paeroa District High School Headmaster.
- Arthur Kinsella - former Minister of Education, Member of the New Zealand House of Representatives for Hauraki (electorate), and Paeroa District High School Headmaster.
