= Bruce Townshend =

Charles Bruce Townshend (21 November 1931 – 25 April 1987) was a New Zealand politician of the National Party.

== Biography ==
New Zealand Parliament
Years	Term	Electorate	Party
1978–1981	39th	Kaimai	National
1981–1984	40th	Kaimai	National
1984–1987	41st	Kaimai	National

Townshend was born in Paeroa in 1931, and he received his education at Netherton School and Paeroa College. Following this he took over his father's farm, before becoming the Rural Valuer and Director of the New Zealand Co-operative Dairy Company.

In 1971 he was elected to the Hauraki Plains County Council, and in 1974 he was elected to the role of deputy chairman.

He represented the Kaimai electorate in Parliament from 1978 to 25 April 1987, when he died in office. Robert Anderson replaced him later that year at the 1987 election.

During his time in Parliament, Townshed argued against Homosexual Law Reform, and advocated to Robert Muldoon to introduce a Goods and Services Tax.

== Notes ==
New Zealand Parliament
New constituency	Member of Parliament for Kaimai; 1978–1987	Succeeded by Robert Anderson
