= Fred Gerbic =

New Zealand politician

The Honourable Fred Gerbic MBE

Minister without Portfolio
- In office 9 February 1990 – 2 November 1990
- Prime Minister: Geoffrey Palmer; Mike Moore

Member of the New Zealand Parliament for Onehunga
- In office 7 June 1980 – 27 October 1990
- Preceded by: Frank Rogers
- Succeeded by: Grahame Thorne

Personal details
- Born: Frederick Miroslav Gerbic; 10 March 1932 Kaitaia, New Zealand
- Died: 29 October 1995 (aged 63) Auckland, New Zealand
- Party: Labour
- Spouse: Joy Nisbet
- Children: 3

Frederick Miroslav Gerbic MBE (10 March 1932 – 29 October 1995) was a New Zealand politician of the Labour Party.

== Biography ==
=== Early life and career ===
Gerbic was born in Kaitaia in 1932. He became an electrical lineman and later married Joy Constance Nisbet and had three children together. He was a trade union organiser before being appointed as Auckland's industrial conciliator. His parents were Dalmatian immigrants and in a 1979 television documentary, Kiwi with a Dally Heart, he journeyed to Yugoslavia to retrace his parents lives prior to arriving in New Zealand.

He joined the Labour Party in 1961 and from 1962 to 1965 he was a member of the New Lynn Borough Council. He became the chairman of Labour's New Lynn electorate committee but resigned as chairman in 1966 in protest of the party head office forcing the retirement of New Lynn MP Rex Mason. His home shifted from New Lynn to Onehunga and became a member of the Onehunga electorate committee in 1971. At the 1971 local-body elections he was a Labour candidate for the Auckland Electric-Power Board, but was unsuccessful. At the 1972 election he was a campaign organiser for the MP for Onehunga Hugh Watt.

=== Member of Parliament ===
New Zealand Parliament
| Years | Term | Electorate | Party |
|---|---|---|---|
| 1980–1981 | 39th | Onehunga | Labour |
| 1981–1984 | 40th | Onehunga | Labour |
| 1984–1987 | 41st | Onehunga | Labour |
| 1987–1990 | 42nd | Onehunga | Labour |

When Frank Rogers (who succeeded Watt as MP for Onehunga in 1975) died in 1980, there was a mid-term vacancy in the electorate. Gerbic put himself forward to be the Labour candidate at the ensuing by-election. Out of thirteen candidates Gerbic was selected to stand in the seat. After winning the Labour nomination, Gerbic took a leave of absence from his job as an Industrial Conciliator. As he was not classified as a civil servant under the electoral act he was not obliged to resign his position. He was cautioned in regards to his role by the Minister of Labour Jim Bolger on his future as an Industrial Conciliator in the event he lose the election. Bolger's warning was made in retaliation to Gerbic's criticisms of the government's response to an industrial dispute holding up construction of the Mangere Bridge. He went on to win the by-election and entered parliament. In February 1982 he was elected to the Shadow Cabinet and appointed Shadow Minister of Labour and State Services by party leader Bill Rowling.

Soon after Gerbic became Shadow Minister of Labour there were serious discussions regarding the future of affiliated trade unions in the Labour Party. Labour was frequently attacked for being the 'party of unions' despite only 15% of unions being affiliated and providing just 8% of the annual party funds. In February 1982 Rowling gave a speech at a Labour regional conference in Timaru where he suggested Labour should remove its formal links with trade unions, highlighting the party's public perception of being too closely linked with unions and a large demographic shift in the party membership away from the working class and towards middle-class liberals. Gerbic supported Rowling, as did several leading union figures such as national secretary of the New Zealand Electrical and Related Trades Union Tony Neary and secretary of the Wellington Clothing Workers Union Frank Thorn who stated their belief that their affiliation fees were too high and offered little benefit in return. Others such as Jim Knox, the secretary of the New Zealand Federation of Labour and Jim Anderton, the president of the Labour Party, were opposed and argued for a continuing union presence in the party. By March the debate heated up with Gerbic and Rowling publicly expressing a further concern that some affiliated unions had members of other parties, in particular the Socialist Unity Party (SUP). Anderton publicly disagreed with Gerbic stating that the SUP had no influence in the Labour Party and that "The entire membership of the SUP could be written on the back of a postage stamp." At Labour's annual conference in May 1982 Gerbic used most of his speaking time to attack Anderton for publicly disagreeing with him over the SUP rather than advocating for the policy proposal to remove affiliates. Gerbic's speech finished with a more booing than applause. The conference delegates rejected the proposal and trade union affiliation remained in the Labour Party.

He had a portfolio shift in 1983 when David Lange replaced Rowling as leader, being instead appointed as spokesperson for industrial conciliation and accident compensation.

After the 1987 election he was appointed as an undersecretary to the Ministers of Immigration, Transport, Civil Aviation and Meteriological Services. Gerbic was later a Minister without Portfolio, outside of cabinet, towards the end of the Fourth Labour Government. He was associate Minister of Immigration, Transport, Civil Aviation and Meteriological Services from 9 February 1990 to 2 November 1990.

Parliamentary colleague Michael Bassett described Gerbic as a "boss' man" who would always take the side of whoever was leader. Jonathan Hunt said he had a very generous spirit and an infectious sense of humour. He retired from politics in 1990, after he was defeated by National's Grahame Thorne.

After leaving parliament Gerbic found himself centred in a political scandal when in September 1992 rebel National MP Gilbert Myles accused him of operating a graft while a minister. Myles, under Parliamentary privilege, alleged that Gerbic took financial donations in exchange for residency approvals in his capacity as associate Minister of Immigration and in support tabled a transcript of an alleged tape recorded conversation between two Auckland Labour Party members. Gerbic denied the allegations and maintained his innocence throughout. The claims were investigated by John McGrath QC who found no evidence of impropriety by Gerbic and dismissed Myles' claims.

=== Later life and death ===
Following politics he worked for an immigration consultancy firm with former National MP Aussie Malcolm. Malcolm described Gerbic as "very much part of the old Labour school that had the interests of the ordinary man at heart."

In the 1993 Queen's Birthday Honours, Gerbic was appointed a Member of the Order of the British Empire (civil division), for public services.

Gerbic died at his home in Hillsborough on 29 October 1995 whilst mowing his lawn.

== Notes ==
New Zealand Parliament
| Preceded by Frank Rogers | Member of Parliament for Onehunga; 1980–1990 | Succeeded by Grahame Thorne |
