= Hugh Watt =

New Zealand politician (1912–1980)

The Right Honourable Hugh Watt JP
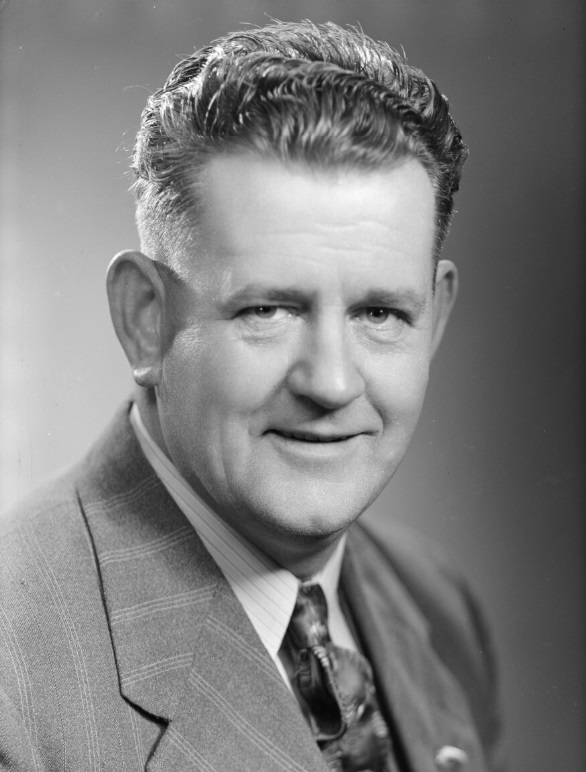
- Watt in 1951

Prime Minister of New Zealand
- Acting; 31 August 1974 – 6 September 1974
- Monarch: Elizabeth II
- Governor-General: Denis Blundell
- Deputy: Himself
- Preceded by: Norman Kirk
- Succeeded by: Bill Rowling

5th Deputy Prime Minister of New Zealand
- In office 8 December 1972 – 10 September 1974
- Prime Minister: Norman Kirk; Himself (acting); Bill Rowling
- Preceded by: Robert Muldoon
- Succeeded by: Bob Tizard

24th Minister of Labour
- In office 8 December 1972 – 10 September 1974
- Prime Minister: Norman Kirk; Himself (acting); Bill Rowling
- Preceded by: David Thomson
- Succeeded by: Arthur Faulkner

24th Minister of Works
- In office 10 September 1974 – 13 March 1975
- Prime Minister: Bill Rowling
- Preceded by: Arthur Faulkner
- Succeeded by: Mick Connelly
- In office 8 December 1972 – 29 August 1974
- Prime Minister: Norman Kirk
- Preceded by: Percy Allen
- Succeeded by: Arthur Faulkner
- In office 12 December 1957 – 12 December 1960
- Prime Minister: Walter Nash
- Preceded by: Stan Goosman
- Succeeded by: Stan Goosman

3rd Minister of Electricity
- In office 12 December 1957 – 12 December 1960
- Prime Minister: Walter Nash
- Preceded by: Stan Goosman
- Succeeded by: Stan Goosman

Member of the New Zealand Parliament for Onehunga
- In office 19 December 1953 – 29 November 1975
- Preceded by: Arthur Osborne
- Succeeded by: Frank Rogers

Personal details
- Born: 19 March 1912 Claremont, Western Australia, Australia
- Died: 4 February 1980 (aged 67) Auckland, New Zealand
- Party: Labour
- Spouses: Alice Merry Fowke (m. 1935; div. 1965) Frances Ray (m. 1968)
- Children: 4
- Profession: Engineer
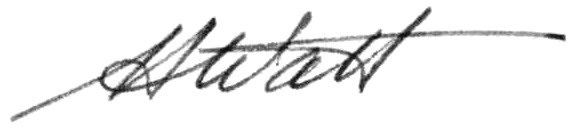
- Signature

Hugh Watt PC JP (19 March 1912 – 4 February 1980) was a New Zealand politician who was a Labour member of Parliament and the acting prime minister of New Zealand between 31 August and 6 September 1974, following the death of Prime Minister Norman Kirk. He had been the fifth deputy prime minister of New Zealand since 8 December 1972. Watt later served as high commissioner to the United Kingdom.

== Biography ==
=== Early life ===
Watt was born in Perth, Western Australia, in 1912. His father, William Watt, was a mining engineer, and his family emigrated to New Zealand in 1914, when he was two years old, settling in Auckland. His father lost an arm in Australia and moved back to New Zealand to take up a position as a watchman at the Auckland Harbour Board. Watt attended Remuera Primary School, where his headmaster was Sir Leslie Munro's father.

Watt attended Seddon Memorial Technical College, where he studied engineering and also played senior grade rugby for the Tech Old Boys' club. He became an apprentice engineer and joined the Engineers' Union, of which he was a member for 16 years. He enjoyed his union membership but never aspired to hold any office within it. He established his own engineering business in 1947. He was director of the business, Hugh Watt & Coy Ltd, which operated in both engineering operations and sheet metal working. He continued to run the business (even while a minister) until 1969, when he accepted a doctor's advice to lessen his workload. Previously, in 1962, he had also reduced his workload by resigning as executive director of the Auckland City Development Association after one year in the role. He was succeeded by Allan Highet (later a National MP).

Watt was married twice: first to Alice Merry Fowke from 1935 to 1965, when they divorced; and then to Irene Frances Ray from 1968. He had two sons and two daughters with his first wife. Watt was Australian-born, like Labour Party founders such as Harry Holland, Michael Joseph Savage, Bob Semple, and Paddy Webb, and later MPs such as Mabel Howard and Jerry Skinner. He was born on the same street where Australian Prime Minister John Curtin, of whom Watt was a great admirer, once lived.

=== Political career ===
==== Member of Parliament ====
New Zealand Parliament
Years	Term	Electorate	Party
1953–1954	30th	Onehunga	Labour
1954–1957	31st	Onehunga	Labour
1957–1960	32nd	Onehunga	Labour
1960–1963	33rd	Onehunga	Labour
1963–1966	34th	Onehunga	Labour
1966–1969	35th	Onehunga	Labour
1969–1972	36th	Onehunga	Labour
1972–1975	37th	Onehunga	Labour

Watt was the chairman of the Onehunga Labour Representation Committee and a member of the Labour Party's national executive. He stood unsuccessfully for Labour in Remuera in 1949 and in Parnell in 1951. His initial failures were to help his subsequent development as a politician, saying, "I learned early in my political life that you've got to take the kicks with the congratulations". At the 1953 local elections he was elected a member of the Auckland Harbour Board (his father's former employer) for the Onehunga, Newmarket, and combined districts. He was then successful in winning the parliamentary seat of Onehunga in a 1953 by-election after the death of Arthur Osborne, and held it until 1975.

==== Second Labour Government ====
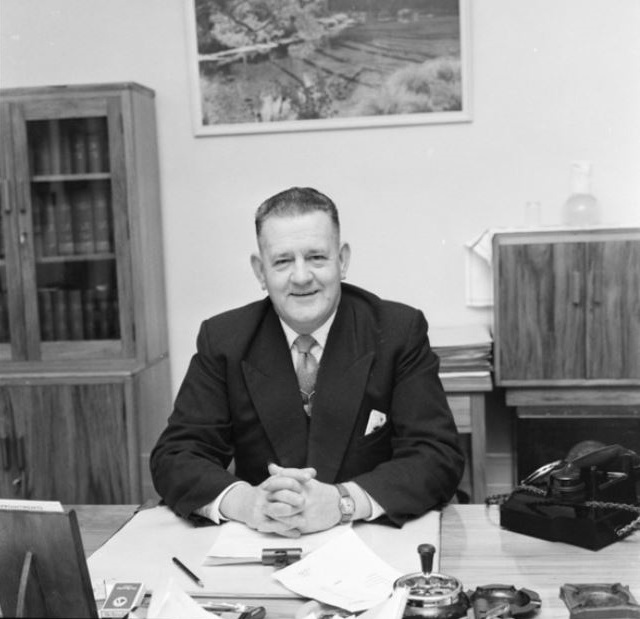
Watt in 1959

Watt was first appointed as a minister in the Second Labour Government led by Walter Nash; he was Minister of Works from 1957 to 1960, and additionally, Minister of Electricity from 1958 until 1960. He resigned from the Auckland Harbour Board in December 1957 after his appointment to the cabinet. As Minister of Works, he quickly became known for both his vitality and his genial style of inspecting infrastructure sites. During the Second Labour Government, he oversaw one of the most constructive and positive periods of public development New Zealand had seen. He started construction on the Benmore Dam and ensured that when it was completed it was £12 million under the original estimates. Watt was also the Chairman of the National Roads Board from 1957 to 1960. He thought his reform of the National Roads Board levy system was his biggest achievement in the government's term and saw a large improvement in urban motorways as a result of diversifying the board members to come from cities as well as rural areas.

In January 1960 Watt signed an agreement with Consolidated Zinc to establish an aluminium smelter to be built in Southland to make aluminium out of alumina shipped from Australia. The smelter was to be powered by a huge hydro-electric project at Lakes Manapouri and Te Anau. The decision was not without controversy as Watt received many letters of protest warning against damage to the scenery which would be caused by raising the lake levels. The New Zealand Scenery Preservation Society sent a deputation to meet with Nash and Watt. Watt quoted an assurance made by the company that the engineering works would be constructed so as to enhance the scenic effects, nor would the lake levels be raised so high as to endanger the town of Te Anau. Labour's manifesto at the 1957 election pledged industrialisation and the smelter was seen as following this pledge. Industrialisation was emphasised even more in Labour's manifesto at the 1960 election which Labour was to lose ending his role as a minister.

==== Opposition ====
Soon after the government's defeat, Watt was speculated as Labour's likely candidate for Mayor of Auckland at the 1962 local elections. Labour was putting up a full council ticket for the first time in several election cycles and thought that the Labour ticket should include a mayoral candidate as well to assist in publicity. Watt was already well known as an MP and former minister and thought ideal for the role. However, Watt ruled himself out stating he felt he could make a greater contribution to the city's development by remaining in national politics and that he wished to do so by serving in the cabinet of the next Labour government.

When Labour was in opposition, several previous ministers had either died or retired and Watt soon found himself as one of the party's most experienced MPs. He stood for the position of Deputy Leader in 1962 following the death of Jerry Skinner but was defeated by Fred Hackett. Following Hackett's own death in 1963 he stood again and was this time elected, narrowly ahead of Norman Kirk. At 11 years, 4 months and 12 days Watt is Labour's longest-serving deputy leader, first under Arnold Nordmeyer and then under Kirk. He was the Shadow Minister of Works and Electricity while Labour was in opposition. Watt, and the Labour Party as a whole, were opposed to the Vietnam War. Whilst acting Leader of the Opposition he boycotted an official welcome function for South Vietnamese leader Nguyễn Cao Kỳ during his visit to New Zealand in January 1967.

During this period Watt suffered several health scares. In 1962 he had an operation in Auckland Hospital for an undisclosed illness. Later, in 1967 he had his appendix removed and in 1969 he suffered a heart attack. Later that same year he was admitted to hospital yet again with both influenza and inflammation round the heart. He had also been a diabetic since 1955. Due to his precarious health there was much speculation that the Labour caucus might replace him as deputy leader. In February 1971, Arthur Faulkner and potentially Bill Rowling were contemplating standing against him, however neither did allowing Watt to be re-elected once again unopposed.

==== Third Labour Government ====
During the Third Labour Government, in the ministry led by Norman Kirk, he was Minister of Labour (1972–1974) and Minister of Works and Development (1972–1974). As the only member of the government with prior cabinet experience Watt carried a significant amount of responsibility handling both the strenuous Labour portfolio and had high demands in foreign relations as Deputy Prime Minister. Mike Moore, a backbencher at the time, said Watt had "carried the 1972–75 Labour government."

In the highly demanding role of Minister of Labour he offered an "open door policy" to all parties in industrial disputes. However he quickly found that this was causing excessive demands on his time by warring trade unions and employers and he found himself in a position of being "too accessible". From 1973 he was given an Under-Secretary in the Labour portfolio, Eddie Isbey, which eased his workload. Regardless, his tenure as Minister of Labour was seen as successful in keeping disruptive industrial disputes to a minimum.

As Deputy Prime Minister he made a "futile but necessary" trip to Paris in April 1973 to voice New Zealand's opposition to nuclear weapons testing in French Polynesia. He also visited London and met with Prime Minister Edward Heath in an attempt to win British support, even offering to let Heath skipper the protest vessel, but failed to persuade the British government to support New Zealand's stand.

Watt continued to have a high workload and Kirk mooted taking the Works and Development portfolio from him to help, however Watt was reluctant to drop Works and Development as he enjoyed the role. He preferred to give up the Labour portfolio, but Kirk wanted him to remain in it as he was "making his mark" in it. In early 1974 he announced that he would stay on as Minister of Labour "in the national interest" but would be replaced as Minister of Works and Development.

Following Kirk's sudden death on 31 August 1974, the government was left with a leadership vacancy. Watt, who was then serving as Deputy Prime Minister, acted as prime minister for six days before a new leader was elected. Watt was quick to declare his candidacy stating that he would be available for the leadership if asked stating "I have always said if the situation arose when I was called on to do the job I would not hesitate to put my name forward. Of course there is nothing to stop any other members of caucus doing the same." At the same time he also dispelled rumours that if successful he would just be an interim leader saying he would have every intention of leading Labour at the 1975 election. Although Watt was initially seen as the front-runner, the Minister of Finance and former party president Bill Rowling soon appeared to have more momentum than Watt. The party's National Executive and the Federation of Labour preferred Watt to Rowling and made their support known. Ultimately, on 6 September, Rowling was elected by the caucus to replace Kirk as Labour Party Leader and Prime Minister at the leadership election. After losing the leadership ballot Watt decided to retire as deputy leader. Though disappointed, Watt took the defeat graciously and fought back tears informing reporters he had been defeated, later admitting that losing the leadership vote was "the greatest, most tragic disappointment of my life, it knocked me tremendously". Most of the votes Watt received were from Labour's senior MPs such as Henry May who thought Watt deserved the leadership and that many backbenchers, who did not appreciate the administrative burden he carried, unfairly voted against him. However most in the parliamentary party felt at 61 he was too old and that Labour needed a younger leader.

In the Rowling ministry, Watt regained his cherished Works and Development portfolio and was also designated Minister in charge of Earthquake and War Damage Commission until March 1975, and was subsequently appointed to the Executive Council as a Minister without portfolio. In 1974, he was also appointed to the Privy Council of the United Kingdom alongside former Prime Minister Jack Marshall. Marshall said Watt's appointment (usually reserved only for Prime Ministers) was well deserved as "he had served the House for so long and so faithfully". Watt then decided to retire at the next general election in 1975 to be succeeded by Frank Rogers.

=== Diplomatic career ===
Watt was appointed New Zealand's High Commissioner to the United Kingdom effective from 22 March 1975 for three years. Controversially, he stayed on as a Member of Parliament and Cabinet minister. In June 1975, Watt was asked if he was about to resign as an MP. He stated that:

If I were to resign now as a Member of Parliament [for Onehunga] it would mean that I would lose my Cabinet status and the unique position that I have as High Commissioner with Executive Council rank that gives me access to British Government Ministers."

Upon arriving in London he encountered low staff morale due to a recent workplace restructuring. Watt made it a priority to boost confidence with employees by going out of his way to engage with people in person, gather groups to make decisions collectively and by attending all the staff training sessions himself. He was also shocked at how high a workload the post of high commissioner had, finding himself doing almost the same amount of work as he was when he was a minister. He also worked to advocate for New Zealand's trade interests in Britain, which were severely impacted by Britain's joining the European Communities (EC). During the British referendum (held to gauge support for continued EC membership) Watt was invited to speak at about 100 different gatherings during this period. When discussing the topic with Londoners he found there was still much demand for New Zealand products particularly lamb and butter.

Following the election of the Third National Government Watt was pressured to resign by new Prime Minister Robert Muldoon, it was widely speculated that his recall was purely for political reasons. In the midst of the dispute he warmly welcomed Brian Talboys, the Minister of Foreign Affairs, to London reinforcing his considerate, genial reputation. During his brief time at the High Commission he did a great deal to boost the morale of the staff and a senior official there told media that "His [Watt's] politics and mine do not coincide, but that has nothing to do with the job. He is one of the best high commissioners we have had here for many years". His most important diplomatic task while in London was relaying to Wellington the seriousness of New Zealand's 1976 rugby tour of South Africa and its potential impact on New Zealand's participation in the upcoming Olympic Games in Montreal. His confidential cables cautioned that the All Black tour was perceived abroad as giving tacit support to the apartheid regime in South Africa.

He served only fifteen months of his three-year contract and as part of a well publicised deal he relinquished the role of High Commissioner in exchange for the role of Commissioner of the Accident Compensation Corporation (ACC) in Wellington. He was replaced by Douglas Carter (a recently retired National MP) which served to strengthen the public perception that his removal was politically motivated. Upon his return to New Zealand over 300 people attended a function supporting Watt after his treatment by the new government.

=== Later life and death ===
In late 1977, after witnessing the Moyle Affair and generally depreciating state of politics under Muldoon, Watt put himself forward as a nominee for Onehunga once again stating that he felt that a man of his experience could guide MPs in conduct. Watt had intended to win the nomination again and only serve one term, using the time to lay the groundwork for Mike Moore, his friend and former MP for Eden, to succeed him. Watt had previously encouraged Moore to seek the Onehunga nomination when he retired in 1975, even offering to return from London to campaign on his behalf, but Moore declined. Watt later withdrew his nomination.

Watt gave up his position with ACC when his term ended in June 1979, opting not to renew it for another triennium. His health began to decline rapidly soon after his retirement and he was admitted to Auckland's Green Lane Hospital in October 1979 for surgery to drain a fluid buildup around his lungs. In December 1979 he was made a life member of the Labour Party with party president Jim Anderton visiting Watt in hospital to bestow him with the award.

Watt died on 4 February 1980 in Green Lane Hospital after a long illness, aged 67 years. He was survived by his wife, ex-wife and four children. His first wife Alice died in 1993 and his second wife Frances died in 2013.

== Honours and commemorations ==
Hugh Watt Drive, a road running along the Onehunga waterfront in Auckland, was named to commemorate Watt. The Labour Party purchased a property on Grey Street in Onehunga which became the headquarters of the local Labour Party and named Hugh Watt Hall in his honour. The hall was managed by the Onehunga Labour Society which was later renamed the Hugh Watt Society also in his honour.

== Notes ==
New Zealand Parliament
Preceded by Arthur Osborne	Member of Parliament for Onehunga; 1953–1975	Succeeded by Frank Rogers
Political offices
Preceded by Norman Kirk	Prime Minister of New Zealand; Acting; 1974	Succeeded by Bill Rowling
Preceded by Robert Muldoon	Deputy Prime Minister of New Zealand; 1972–1974	Succeeded by Bob Tizard
Preceded by David Thomson	Minister of Labour; 1972–1974	Succeeded by Arthur Faulkner
Preceded by Arthur Faulkner	Minister of Works; 1974–1975 1972–1974 1957–1960	Succeeded by Mick Connelly
Preceded by Percy Allen	Minister of Works; 1974–1975 1972–1974 1957–1960	Succeeded by Arthur Faulkner
Preceded by Stan Goosman	Minister of Works; 1974–1975 1972–1974 1957–1960	Succeeded by Stan Goosman
Preceded by Stan Goosman	Minister of Electricity; 1957–1960	Succeeded by Stan Goosman
Party political offices
Preceded by Fred Hackett	Deputy Leader of the Labour Party; 1963–1974	Succeeded by Bob Tizard
Diplomatic posts
Preceded by Terry McCombs	High Commissioner of New Zealand to the United Kingdom; 1975–1976	Succeeded by Douglas Carter
