= Onehunga (electorate) =

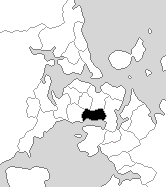
Onehunga electorate boundaries between 1993 and 1996

Onehunga, initially with the formal name of Town of Onehunga, is a former New Zealand parliamentary electorate in the south of the city of Auckland. Between 1861 and 1881, and between 1938 and 1996, it was represented by seven Members of Parliament. It was a stronghold for the Labour Party.

== Population centres ==
In the 1860 electoral redistribution, the House of Representatives increased the number of representatives by 12, reflecting the immense population growth since the original electorates were established in 1853. The redistribution created 15 additional electorates with between one and three members, and Onehunga was one of the single-member electorates. The electorates were distributed to provinces so that every province had at least two members. Within each province, the number of registered electors by electorate varied greatly.

The 1931 New Zealand census had been cancelled due to the Great Depression, so the 1937 electoral redistribution had to take ten years of population growth into account. The increasing population imbalance between the North and South Islands had slowed, and only one electorate seat was transferred from south to north. Five electorates were abolished, one former electorate (Onehunga) was re-established, and four electorates were created for the first time.

The electorate was urban, and comprised a number of suburbs in the southern part of Auckland.

== History ==
The electorate existed in the 19th century from 1861 to 1871 as Town of Onehunga, and then from 1871 to 1881 as Onehunga. For the whole period the seat was held by George O'Rorke, who became Speaker of the House of Representatives in 1879.

Onehunga was recreated in 1938, and lasted to 1996. With the introduction of MMP in 1996, Onehunga and Panmure were combined into the new electorate of Maungakiekie.

Except for 1990–1993, Onehunga was held by Labour from its 1938 recreation.

=== Members of Parliament ===
The Onehunga electorate was represented by seven Members of Parliament.

Key

Independent Labour National

Election	Winner
(electorate established as Town of Onehunga in 1860)
1861 election	George O'Rorke
1866 election	George O'Rorke
(electorate renamed Onehunga in 1871)
1871 election	George O'Rorke
1875 election	George O'Rorke
1879 election	George O'Rorke
(Electorate abolished 1881–1938)
1938 election	Arthur Osborne
1943 election	Arthur Osborne
1946 election	Arthur Osborne
1949 election	Arthur Osborne
1951 election	Arthur Osborne
1953 by-election	Hugh Watt
1954 election	Hugh Watt
1957 election	Hugh Watt
1960 election	Hugh Watt
1963 election	Hugh Watt
1966 election	Hugh Watt
1969 election	Hugh Watt
1972 election	Hugh Watt
1975 election	Frank Rogers
1978 election	Frank Rogers
1980 by-election	Fred Gerbic
1981 election	Fred Gerbic
1984 election	Fred Gerbic
1987 election	Fred Gerbic
1990 election	Grahame Thorne
1993 election	Richard Northey
(Electorate abolished in 1996; see Maungakiekie)

== Election results ==
=== 1993 election ===
1993 general election: Onehunga
Party	Candidate	Votes	%	±%
Labour	Richard Northey	7,183	35.54	
National	Grahame Thorne	6,776	33.53	−9.62
Alliance	Matt Robson	3,503	17.33	
NZ First	Ian Shearer	2,132	10.55	
Christian Heritage	Barrie Paterson	318	1.57	
McGillicuddy Serious	Richard Foster	110	0.54	
Natural Law	Bryan Lee	95	0.47	
Independent	Warwick Jordan	89	0.44	
Majority		407	2.01	
Turnout		20,206	84.44	+9.28
Registered electors		23,929		

=== 1990 election ===
1990 general election: Onehunga
Party	Candidate	Votes	%	±%
National	Grahame Thorne	8,290	43.15	
Labour	Fred Gerbic	7,678	39.96	−16.29
Green	Laurie Ross	1,909	9.93	
NewLabour	Mark Philip	1,016	5.28	
Social Credit	Janice Matthews	170	0.88	
Democrats	Arthur Drabble	148	0.77	
Majority		612	3.18	
Turnout		19,211	75.16	−9.22
Registered electors		25,557		

=== 1987 election ===
1987 general election: Onehunga
Party	Candidate	Votes	%	±%
Labour	Fred Gerbic	10,753	56.25	+5.01
National	Andrew Stanley	7,424	38.84	
Democrats	Thomas Keith Park	937	4.90	
Majority		3,329	17.41	−2.93
Turnout		19,114	84.38	−5.17
Registered electors		22,652		

=== 1984 election ===
1984 general election: Onehunga
Party	Candidate	Votes	%	±%
Labour	Fred Gerbic	11,354	51.24	+3.97
National	Carol Freeman	6,846	30.90	
NZ Party	Peter Blakeborogh	2,894	13.06	
Social Credit	Deborah Maree Terei	841	3.79	
Values	Ruth Helen Gardner Symons	137	0.61	
Independent	Stanley Lusby	83	0.37	
Majority		4,508	20.34	+9.69
Turnout		22,155	89.55	+1.54
Registered electors		24,740		

=== 1981 election ===
1981 general election: Onehunga
Party	Candidate	Votes	%	±%
Labour	Fred Gerbic	8,925	47.27	−0.85
National	Sue Wood	6,913	36.61	−2.63
Social Credit	Stuart Perry	3,040	16.10	+15.11
Majority		2,012	10.65	+1.78
Turnout		18,878	88.01	+37.78
Registered electors		21,451		

=== 1980 by-election ===
1980 Onehunga by-election
Party	Candidate	Votes	%	±%
Labour	Fred Gerbic	6,543	48.12	
National	Sue Wood	5,336	39.24	
Social Credit	Thomas Keith Park	1,535	11.29	−0.06
Independent	Stuart Perry	134	0.99	
Cheer Up	Vince Terreni	35	0.26	
Imperial British Conservative	Max Overton	17	0.13	
Majority		1,207	8.87	
Turnout		13,600	50.23	−10.04
Registered electors		27,071		
Labour hold		Swing		

=== 1978 election ===
1978 general election: Onehunga
Party	Candidate	Votes	%	±%
Labour	Frank Rogers	8,837	46.99	+0.86
National	Barrie Hutchinson	7,420	39.45	
Social Credit	Thomas Keith Park	2,135	11.35	
Values	Dianne Paton	390	2.07	
National Socialist	Colin King-Ansell	22	0.11	
Majority		1,417	7.53	+1.71
Turnout		18,804	60.27	−15.94
Registered electors		31,199		

=== 1975 election ===
1975 general election: Onehunga
Party	Candidate	Votes	%	±%
Labour	Frank Rogers	8,264	46.13	
National	Kevin O'Brien	7,220	40.30	
Social Credit	Judy Charlton	1,264	7.05	
Values	Jack Frost	1,129	6.30	
Socialist Unity	John Willis	35	0.19	
Majority		1,044	5.82	
Turnout		17,912	76.21	−10.46
Registered electors		23,501		

=== 1972 election ===
1972 general election: Onehunga
Party	Candidate	Votes	%	±%
Labour	Hugh Watt	10,053	58.67	−1.23
National	Peter Blakeborough	5,218	30.45	
Social Credit	Alf Benson	1,669	9.74	+1.15
New Democratic	Arthur Bree	194	1.13	
Majority		4,835	28.21	−0.19
Turnout		17,134	86.67	+0.01
Registered electors		19,767		

=== 1969 election ===
1969 general election: Onehunga
Party	Candidate	Votes	%	±%
Labour	Hugh Watt	9,574	59.90	+1.38
National	Daphne Double	5,035	31.50	+2.83
Social Credit	Alf Benson	1,373	8.59	
Majority		4,539	28.40	−1.45
Turnout		15,982	85.66	−1.86
Registered electors		18,657		

=== 1966 election ===
1966 general election: Onehunga
Party	Candidate	Votes	%	±%
Labour	Hugh Watt	8,361	58.52	−4.61
National	Daphne Double	4,096	28.67	
Social Credit	James Robinson	1,828	12.79	
Majority		4,265	29.85	−3.98
Turnout		14,285	83.80	−5.10
Registered electors		17,045		

=== 1963 election ===
1963 general election: Onehunga
Party	Candidate	Votes	%	±%
Labour	Hugh Watt	9,567	63.13	−1.96
National	J P Mason	4,440	29.29	
Social Credit	John Clarence Leitch	741	4.88	+0.93
Liberal	W F Lauder	274	1.80	
Communist	Stan Hieatt	132	0.87	
Majority		5,127	33.83	−1.03
Turnout		15,154	88.90	+9.73
Registered electors		17,045		

=== 1960 election ===
1960 general election: Onehunga
Party	Candidate	Votes	%	±%
Labour	Hugh Watt	8,785	65.09	−2.23
National	Paul Brian Phillips	4,080	30.23	
Social Credit	John Clarence Leitch	534	3.95	
Communist	Donald McEwan	97	0.71	
Majority		4,705	34.86	−4.39
Turnout		13,496	79.17	−14.48
Registered electors		17,045		

=== 1957 election ===
1957 general election: Onehunga
Party	Candidate	Votes	%	±%
Labour	Hugh Watt	9,752	67.32	+4.83
National	Donald Watson	4,066	28.07	
Social Credit	George Alexander Pealing	667	4.60	
Majority		5,686	39.25	+8.89
Turnout		14,485	93.65	+2.16
Registered electors		15,466		

=== 1954 election ===
1954 general election: Onehunga
Party	Candidate	Votes	%	±%
Labour	Hugh Watt	9,033	62.49	−4.50
National	Alfred E. Allen	4,644	32.12	
Social Credit	Ernest Richard James	777	5.37	
Majority		4,389	30.36	−3.61
Turnout		14,454	91.49	+28.01
Registered electors		15,797		

=== 1953 by-election ===
1953 Onehunga by-election
Party	Candidate	Votes	%	±%
Labour	Hugh Watt	6,868	66.99	
National	Leonard Bradley	3,385	33.01	−10.01
Informal votes		13	0.13	
Majority		3,483	33.97	
Turnout		13,749	63.48	−23.51
Registered electors		16,171		
Labour hold		Swing		

=== 1951 election ===
1951 general election: Onehunga
Party	Candidate	Votes	%	±%
Labour	Arthur Osborne	8,017	56.98	−0.31
National	Leonard Bradley	6,051	43.02	
Majority		1,966	13.97	−1.99
Turnout		14,068	86.99	−5.02
Registered electors		16,171		

=== 1949 election ===
1949 general election: Onehunga
Party	Candidate	Votes	%	±%
Labour	Arthur Osborne	8,255	57.29	−5.06
National	Alan A. Coates	5,955	41.33	
Communist	Roy Stanley	198	1.37	
Majority		2,300	15.96	−8.75
Turnout		14,408	92.01	−2.21
Registered electors		15,658		

=== 1946 election ===
1946 general election: Onehunga
Party	Candidate	Votes	%	±%
Labour	Arthur Osborne	8,639	62.35	+6.67
National	William Kenneth King	5,215	37.64	
Majority		3,424	24.71	+4.13
Turnout		13,854	94.22	+5.07
Registered electors		14,703		

=== 1943 election ===
1943 general election: Onehunga
Party	Candidate	Votes	%	±%
Labour	Arthur Osborne	8,993	55.68	−8.88
National	John Park	5,704	35.31	+0.36
Democratic Labour	Norman Douglas	1,099	6.80	
Real Democracy	Theodore Edwin Somerville	287	1.77	
People's Movement	Louis Edgar Read	67	0.41	
Informal votes		115	0.71	+0.21
Majority		3,324	20.58	−9.00
Turnout		16,150	89.15	−3.62
Registered electors		18,115		

=== 1938 election ===
1938 general election: Onehunga
Party	Candidate	Votes	%	±%
Labour	Arthur Osborne	9,412	64.56	
National	John Park	5,098	34.95	
Informal votes		73	0.50	
Majority		4,314	29.58	
Turnout		14,583	92.77	
Registered electors		15,718		
