= Frank Rogers (politician) =

New Zealand politician

Member of the New Zealand Parliament for Onehunga
- In office 29 November 1975 – 25 April 1980
- Preceded by: Hugh Watt
- Succeeded by: Fred Gerbic

Personal details
- Born: Frank Lewis Rogers; 27 December 1933 Auckland, New Zealand
- Died: 25 April 1980 (aged 46) Whangārei, New Zealand
- Party: Labour
- Children: 2
- Profession: Builder

Frank Lewis Rogers (27 December 1933 – 25 April 1980) was a New Zealand politician of the Labour Party.

== Biography ==
=== Early life and career ===
Rogers was born in Onehunga on 27 December 1933. He was raised in St Joseph's Orphanage in Takapuna. He lied about his age to leave school early and gained employment as an apprentice carpenter. He earned a small wage which went almost entirely on rent, not even leaving enough for tram tickets to and from work.

In 1965 he set up his own construction firm which employed 60 people at its peak, but the firm closed in 1979 after construction demand fell following the 1973–75 recession. He became an executive member of the Master Builders Association.

Rogers was an active sports enthusiast. He played third-grade rugby and played representative rugby league for Richmond. He also enjoyed running, tramping, deerstalking and skydiving. He was also the President of the Auckland Lions Club and President of the Auckland Caledonian Dancing Society.

=== Political career ===
New Zealand Parliament
Years	Term	Electorate	Party
1975–1978	38th	Onehunga	Labour
1978–1980	39th	Onehunga	Labour

Rogers joined the Labour Party in 1953 and held a number of executive positions in the party. He was vice-president of the Onehunga Central branch. In the 1974 local-body elections he stood as a Labour candidate for the Auckland Regional Authority in the Onehunga ward, but was unsuccessful. A year later he won nomination for the safe Labour seat of Onehunga following the retirement of former Deputy Prime Minister Hugh Watt who had been appointed New Zealand's High Commissioner to the United Kingdom. He won selection over 26 other aspirants including better known candidates such as Malcolm Douglas, Jack Elder and Barry Gustafson.

He served as the Member of Parliament for Onehunga from 1975 until 1980. In January 1976 he was appointed by Rowling as Shadow Minister of Statistics. In 1977 he was instead designated as Shadow Postmaster-General.

Rogers had a low-key approach to politics and did not make much of an impression in Parliament. Accordingly, ahead of the 1978 election there were several challengers amongst the local party for the Labour nomination in Onehunga (including his predecessor Hugh Watt). Rogers, who was supported by the party leadership, won reselection and was re-elected in 1978. Fellow Labour MP Michael Bassett described Rogers as a "lacklustre" MP who was a staunch supporter of then leader Bill Rowling.

=== Death ===
Rogers died on 25 April 1980 in Whangārei Hospital several days after having a stroke after stopping to help two people who survived a car crash in Northland. He was survived by his wife, son and daughter.

Following his death Fred Gerbic was elected to replace him in the ensuing by-election.

== Notes ==
New Zealand Parliament
Preceded by Hugh Watt	Member of Parliament for Onehunga; 1975–1980	Succeeded by Fred Gerbic
