= Kaimai (electorate) =

Kaimai is a former New Zealand parliamentary electorate, from 1978 to 1996. In 1996 the MP Robert Anderson was selected for the new seat of Coromandel, but retired due to illness, and was replaced by Murray McLean, who won the new seat.

== Population centres ==
The 1977 electoral redistribution was the most overtly political since the Representation Commission had been established through an amendment to the Representation Act in 1886, initiated by Muldoon's National Government. As part of the 1976 census, a large number of people failed to fill out an electoral re-registration card, and census staff had not been given the authority to insist on the card being completed. This had little practical effect for people on the general roll, but it transferred Māori to the general roll if the card was not handed in. Together with a northward shift of New Zealand's population, this resulted in five new electorates having to be created in the upper part of the North Island. The electoral redistribution was very disruptive, and 22 electorates were abolished, while 27 electorates were newly created (including Kaimai) or re-established. These changes came into effect for the 1978 election.

The Kaimai was established by incorporating some suburbs that had belonged to the Tauranga electorate, getting the southern part of the abolished Coromandel electorate, and gaining Te Puke from the abolished Bay of Plenty electorate. Other than Te Puke, population centres of the original electorate included Mount Maunganui, Katikati, Welcome Bay, Maungatapu, Papamoa, and Waihi Beach.

As a result of electoral redistribution prior to the 1996 election, the Kaimai electorate was abolished and its area split between the Tauranga, Bay of Plenty, and Coromandel electorates.

== History ==
National's Bruce Townshend was the Kaimai electorate's representative from its creation in 1978 to his death on 25 April 1987. Whilst general elections have since the 1957 election traditionally been held on the last Saturday in November and a by-election is required if the death of an MP occurs more than six months prior to an election, the 1987 was held in August and no by-election was triggered; the earlier election date was a result of Muldoon's July 1984 snap election. Robert Anderson replaced Townshend at the 1987 election. Anderson had been selected as National candidate for the Coromandel electorate in 1996, but withdrew due to cancer.

=== Members of Parliament ===
Key

National

Election	Winner
1978 election	Bruce Townshend
1981 election	Bruce Townshend
1984 election	Bruce Townshend
1987 election	Robert Anderson
1990 election	Robert Anderson
1993 election	Robert Anderson
Electorate abolished 1996; see Tauranga, Bay of Plenty, and Coromandel

== Election results ==
=== 1993 election ===
1993 general election: Kaimai
Party	Candidate	Votes	%	±%
National	Robert Anderson	6,570	33.17	−28.45
NZ First	Peter Brown	6,198	31.29	
Labour	Lois Davies	3,660	18.48	
Alliance	Ian Stephens	2,894	14.61	
Christian Heritage	Terry Chester	362	1.82	
Natural Law	Stephen Benner	66	0.33	
Independent	Harold Dassler	54	0.27	−1.61
Majority		372	1.87	−36.63
Turnout		19,804	82.31	+0.40
Registered electors		24,059		

=== 1990 election ===
1990 general election: Kaimai
Party	Candidate	Votes	%	±%
National	Robert Anderson	13,039	61.62	+5.92
Labour	Gordon Dickson	4,892	23.12	
Green	Laraine Johnstone	2,027	9.57	
NewLabour	Jonathan Read	564	2.66	
Social Credit	Harold Dassler	398	1.88	
McGillicuddy Serious	Roger Anthony Bullot	136	0.64	
Democrats	Peter David Langman	103	0.48	
Majority		8,147	38.50	+26.60
Turnout		21,159	81.91	−4.34
Registered electors		25,830		

=== 1987 election ===
1987 general election: Kaimai
Party	Candidate	Votes	%	±%
National	Robert Anderson	10,791	55.70	
Labour	Henry Uttinger	7,118	36.74	
Democrats	T A Powell	887	4.57	
NZ Party	W W Townsend	577	2.97	
Majority		2,307	11.90	
Turnout		19,373	86.25	−5.11
Registered electors		22,460		

=== 1984 election ===
1984 general election: Kaimai
Party	Candidate	Votes	%	±%
National	Bruce Townshend	9,242	42.58	−7.51
NZ Party	Leslie Dickson	5,546	25.55	
Labour	M A Tucker	5,355	24.67	
Social Credit	Vic Haines	1,422	6.55	
Values	C Corbett	137	0.63	
Majority		3,696	17.03	−7.01
Turnout		21,702	91.36	+3.92
Registered electors		23,752		

=== 1981 election ===
1981 general election: Kaimai
Party	Candidate	Votes	%	±%
National	Bruce Townshend	10,719	50.09	+4.38
Social Credit	Doug Conway	5,573	26.04	−0.88
Labour	Leo Mangos	4,750	22.19	
Values	Jon Mayson	278	1.29	−1.62
Independent	C B Watt	79	0.36	
Majority		5,146	24.04	+5.25
Turnout		21,399	87.44	+18.95
Registered electors		24,470		

=== 1978 election ===
1978 general election: Kaimai
Party	Candidate	Votes	%	±%
National	Bruce Townshend	8,457	45.71	
Social Credit	Doug Conway	4,981	26.92	
Labour	Henry Uttinger	4,521	24.43	
Values	Jon Mayson	540	2.91	
Majority		3,476	18.79	
Turnout		18,499	68.49	
Registered electors		27,009		
