= 2018 New Zealand First Party deputy leadership election =

2015 New Zealand First Party deputy leadership election
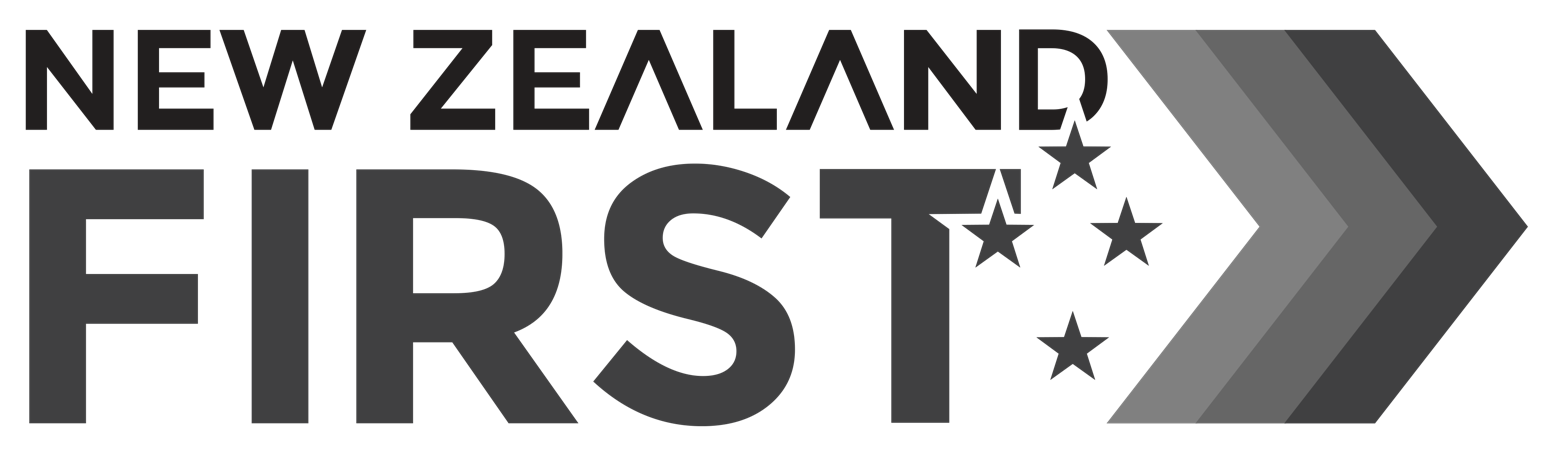
- 27 February 2018
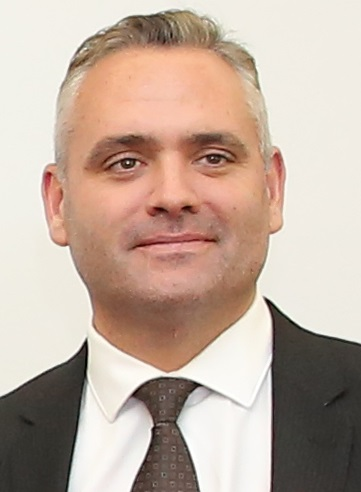

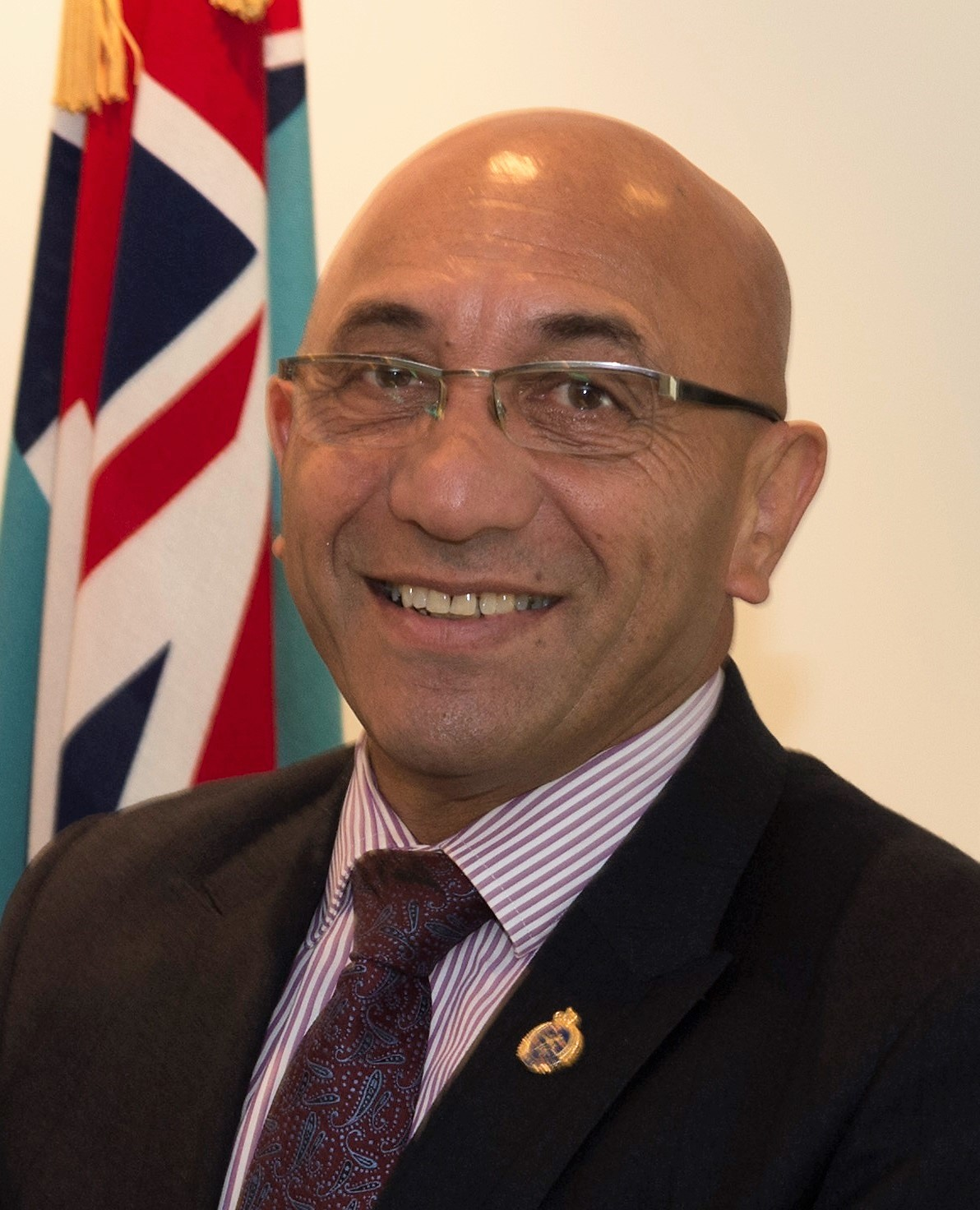
Candidate	Fletcher Tabuteau	Ron Mark
Popular vote	≥5	<5
Deputy Leader before election
Ron Mark
Deputy Leader after election
Fletcher Tabuteau

An election for the parliamentary Deputy leadership of the New Zealand First Party took place in the NZ First Party parliamentary caucus on 27 February 2018. Incumbent deputy leader and sitting List MP, Ron Mark was challenged for the position by fellow list MP Fletcher Tabuteau. In the election Tabuteau won the required number of votes and replaced Mark as deputy leader of the party.

== Background ==
Rumors that incumbent deputy leader Ron Mark, who had successfully challenged deputy leader Tracey Martin in 2015 was set to be rolled by a member of the NZ First caucus were first published in a Stuff.co.nz article on February 22, with the only candidate being list MP Fletcher Tabuteau. Other possible candidates Tracey Martin and Shane Jones had both ruled themselves out, both citing their heavy ministerial workloads that had taken on after the formation of the Coalition government at the 2017 New Zealand general election.

Prior to the leadership election, a change of hands seemed all but guaranteed, with Stuff citing that party leader Winston Peters, who was assumed to have voted for Mark's opponent Martin in the 2015 deputy leadership election, would probably be throwing his support behind Tabuteau, who was a close ally of his.

== Candidates ==
=== Declared ===
- Ron Mark – Incumbent deputy leader, List MP, Minister of Defence and for Veterans' Affairs.
- Fletcher Tabuteau – List MP, Parliamentary Under-Secretary for foreign affairs', disarmament and arms control and regional economic development.

=== Declined ===
- Shane Jones – List MP, Minister for Regional Economic Development, Infrastructure and Forestry.
- Tracey Martin – Former deputy leader, List MP, Minister of Internal Affairs.

== Aftermath ==
The deputy leadership election was held by the NZ First caucus on 27 February 2018, with Tabuteau, as expected, gaining the needed 5 caucus votes to roll Mark as deputy leader.

Following the election, Mark stated he was privileged to have held the role, and looked forward to being able to focus on his ministerial profiles of Veterans' Affairs and Minister of Defence, and that losing the deputy leadership freed him up to win the Wairarapa electorate come the 2020 New Zealand general election.
