= Shadow Cabinet of Chris Hipkins =

New Zealand shadow cabinet (2023–present)

- Shadow Cabinet of New Zealand
- 30 November 2023 – Present
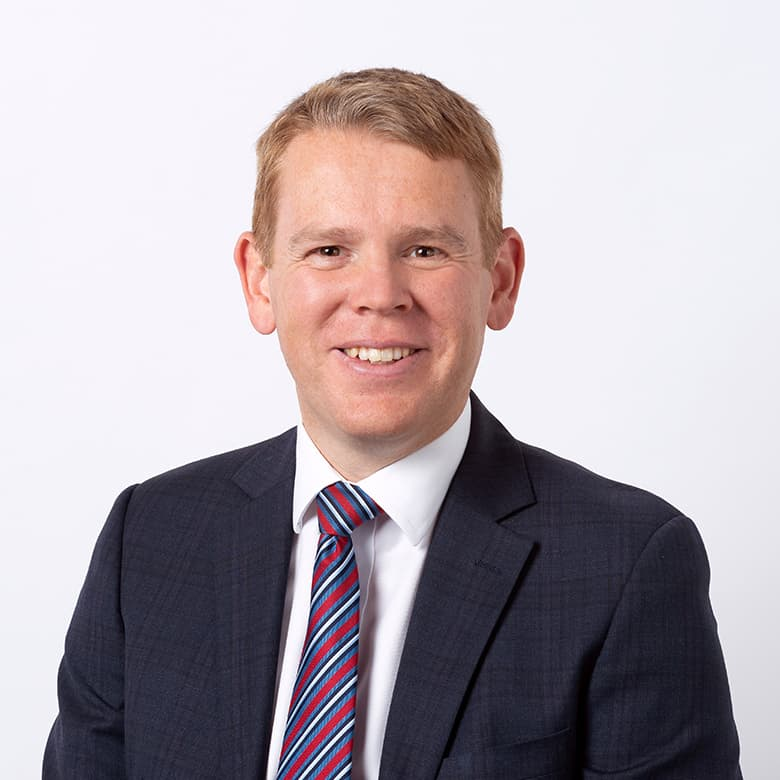
- Date formed: 30 November 2023

People and organisations
- Monarch: Charles III
- Leader of the Opposition: Chris Hipkins
- Deputy Leader of the Opposition: Carmel Sepuloni
- Member party: New Zealand Labour Party
- Status in legislature: Official Opposition

History
- Incoming formation: 2023 general election
- Legislature term: 54th New Zealand Parliament
- Predecessor: Shadow Cabinet of Christopher Luxon

The Shadow Cabinet of Chris Hipkins is the official Opposition in the 54th New Zealand Parliament. It comprises the members of the New Zealand Labour Party, which is the largest political party that is not a member of the government.

Labour leader Chris Hipkins announced his shadow cabinet on 30 November 2023, after the formation of the Sixth National Government.

== History ==
=== Formation ===
On 7 November 2023 the Labour caucus re-elected Hipkins as leader and elected Carmel Sepuloni deputy leader after Kelvin Davis declined to remain in the role. Labour's senior and junior whips, Tangi Utikere and Camilla Belich respectively, were re-elected. Hipkins deferred announcing portfolio assignments until after the incoming government was formed. On 29 November it was revealed that Grant Robertson and Ayesha Verrall would hold the finance and health portfolios, with the remainder to be announced the following day.

Many former ministers in the Hipkins-led Sixth Labour Government continued in their portfolios, but in opposition. These included Sepuloni in social development, Megan Woods in energy and resources, Willie Jackson in Māori development and broadcasting, Kieran McAnulty in local government and regional development, Ginny Andersen in police, Jan Tinetti in education and women, and Barbara Edmonds in economic development. Duncan Webb picked up the justice portfolio and David Parker became spokesperson for foreign affairs. McAnulty also secured the housing portfolio and was named Shadow Leader of the House. All 34 members of the caucus were assigned at least one portfolio but the highest-ranked member who had not previously served as a minister was senior whip Tangi Utikere, at 21, who was also assigned the transport portfolio.

=== Subsequent changes ===
On 15 December 2023, Kelvin Davis (spokesperson for Māori–Crown relations and Treaty of Waitangi negotiations) announced that he would retire from Parliament effective Waitangi Day on 6 February 2024. On 29 January 2024, Rino Tirikatene (spokesperson for corrections and land information) announced that he would retire from Parliament that weekend. The resignations of Tirikatene and Davis, both list MPs, allowed Tracey McLellan and Shanan Halbert to reenter Parliament. On 20 February 2024, Grant Robertson (spokesperson for finance and racing) announced that he would be resigning the following month to take up the position of Vice-Chancellor of the University of Otago. Robertson was succeeded as a list MP by Glen Bennett on 25 March 2024.

Hipkins addressed the three resignations in a single reshuffle on the same day as Robertson's resignation. The eleventh-ranked economic development and associate finance spokesperson Barbara Edmonds was promoted to the fourth rank and the lead finance portfolio, behind senior MP Megan Woods. The other MPs who gained new portfolios were Damien O'Connor (land information), Tangi Utikere (racing portfolios), Ginny Andersen (Treaty of Waitangi negotiations), Peeni Henare Māori–Crown Relations), Halbert (Auckland and rainbow issues), McLellan (corrections and associate health) and Bennett (economic development and associate energy).

In March 2025, Hipkins announced a reshuffle of the Cabinet with a focus on creating a team focused around the economy consisting of Barbara Edmonds, Ginny Andersen, Peeni Henare, Reuben Davidson and Cushla Tangaere-Manuel. Hipkins also gave a state of the nation address focusing on jobs, health and housing at the Auckland Business Chamber, which was attended by Chamber leader Simon Bridges, Mayor of Auckland Wayne Brown and several union and business leaders. Former chief whip and incoming local government spokesperson Tangi Utikere was promoted to the 12th rank and the whips team of Utikere, Camilla Belich and Arena Williams were succeeded by Glen Bennett, Tracey McLellan and Tangaere-Manuel. In a minor reshuffle following the retirement of David Parker in May 2025, Henare became foreign affairs spokesperson and Vanushi Walters rejoined Parliament as shadow attorney-general.

In March 2026, Hipkins further reshuffled his shadow Cabinet ahead of the 2026 general election and following the retirements of Adrian Rurawhe and Peeni Henare and the signalled retirement of Duncan Webb. Key changes included the appointment of Walters as foreign affairs spokesperson, Prime as social development spokesperson, Andersen as education spokesperson, and Belich as justice spokesperson.

=== 2026 election campaigning ===
During Labour's annual general meeting in late November 2025, Hipkins confirmed that the party would contest all seven Māori electorates at the 2026 New Zealand general election; six of which are held by Te Pāti Māori. The party has sought to exploit growing voter disillusionment with the National-led coalition government's handling of cost of living, health, economic and housing issues as well as infighting within Te Pāti Māori.

On 19 May, the Labour Party declined to release details of its Future Funds policy until after the 2026 general election, including the cost to the New Zealand Crown and which state assets would be merged into the fund. The party's finance spokesperson Barbara Edmonds said the delay was due to several state-owned enterprises having accompanying Treaty of Waitangi obligations.

On 8 June, Labour released its party list for the 2026 election. In response, Police Commissioner Richard Chambers criticised Superintendent Rakesh Naidoo, the New Zealand Police's ethnic, iwi and community relations manager, for not earlier disclosing his intention to stand as a Labour candidate. Chambers said that his Labour candidacy posed a conflict of interest, making it untenable for him to continue serving as a senior Police executive. The Police Commissioner also confirmed that the Police would investigate whether Naidoo had shared any sensitive information during the time he was being courted by Labour. In response, Hipkins defended Naidoo's candidacy while Labour's police spokesperson Ginny Andersen accused Police Minister Mark Mitchell of violating the New Zealand Police's independence by instructing Chambers to criticise Naidoo's Labour candidacy.

On 24 August Labour released its election slogan "Better Starts Now," with Hipkins stating that the party would campaign on changing the government. He also said that Labour's campaign would focus on the cost of living, jobs, housing and healthcare. On 27 September, Labour launched its election campaign on 27 September, with Hipkins promising that the Government would forgive 10 percent of eligible student loans at a cost of $583.4 million over the next four years.

On 7 October, Hipkins admitted that Labour would not commit to reversing the National-led government's law change preventing 18 and 19-year olds whose parents earned over $67,225 from receiving Jobseeker welfare benefits. He said that Labour had not costed the policy in its fiscal plan. In mid-October, Hipkins ruled out appointing Green and Te Pāti Māori ministers to the police and corrections portfolios in a future Labour government after several Green and TPM candidates and MPs fraternised with Mongrel Mob members during an election event. On 23 October, Labour candidate Kerrin Leoni was dis-endorsed by the Labour Party after footage of her campaigning at a Mongrel Mob event emerged. Since nominations for the 2026 general election had already closed, Leoni's name will remain on the ballot but without Labour's endorsement.

On 29 October, Labour released its 2026 election manifesto, entitled "What Better Means for New Zealand," which collated its election policy announcements.

== List of spokespersons ==
The list of portfolio spokespersons, as of 11 March 2026, is as follows.

Rank	Spokesperson	Portfolio
1	Rt Hon Chris Hipkins	Leader of the Opposition; Spokesperson for Ministerial Services; Spokesperson for National Security and Intelligence
2	Hon Carmel Sepuloni	Deputy Leader of the Opposition; Spokesperson for Auckland Issues; Spokesperson for Pacific Peoples; Spokesperson for Women
3	Hon Barbara Edmonds	Spokesperson for Finance; Spokesperson for the Economy, Savings and Investment
4	Hon Megan Woods	Spokesperson for Manufacturing and Industry; Spokesperson for Energy and Resources; Associate Spokesperson for Finance
5	Hon Willie Jackson	Spokesperson for Māori Development; Spokesperson for Māori Crown Relations; Associate Spokesperson for Health (Māori)
6	Hon Ayesha Verrall	Spokesperson for Health; Spokesperson for Wellington Issues
7	Hon Kieran McAnulty	Shadow Leader of the House; Spokesperson for Housing; Spokesperson for Infrastructure; Spokesperson for Public Investment
8	Hon Willow-Jean Prime	Spokesperson for Social Development; Spokesperson for Children; Associate Spokesperson for Education (Māori)
9	Hon Ginny Andersen	Spokesperson for Education; Spokesperson for Police; Spokesperson for Jobs and Income; Spokesperson for Treaty of Waitangi Negotiations
10	Hon Jan Tinetti	Spokesperson for Workplace Relations and Safety; Spokesperson for Social Investment; Spokesperson for Early Childhood Education; Spokesperson for Child Poverty Reduction
11	Tangi Utikere	Deputy Shadow Leader of the House; Spokesperson for Transport; Spokesperson for Local Government; Spokesperson for Racing; Spokesperson for State-Owned Enterprises
12	Vanushi Walters	Shadow Attorney-General; Spokesperson for Foreign Affairs Spokesperson for the NZSIS; Spokesperson for the GCSB
13	Reuben Davidson	Spokesperson for Economic Development; Spokesperson for Science, Technology and Innovation Spokesperson for Broadcasting, Media and Creative Economy
14	Hon Priyanca Radhakrishnan	Spokesperson for Conservation; Spokesperson for Disability Issues; Spokesperson for ACC
15	Hon Jo Luxton	Spokesperson for Agriculture; Spokesperson for Biosecurity; Spokesperson for Customs
16	Hon Deborah Russell	Spokesperson for Revenue; Spokesperson for Climate Change; Associate Spokesperson for Finance
17	Hon Rachel Brooking	Spokesperson for the Environment; Spokesperson for Food Safety; Spokesperson for Space; Spokesperson for RMA Reform
18	Hon Damien O'Connor	Spokesperson for Trade and Export Growth; Spokesperson for Defence; Spokesperson for Land Information; Spokesperson for Regional Development
19	Camilla Belich	Spokesperson for Justice; Spokesperson for Public Service
20	Cushla Tangaere-Manuel	Assistant Whip; Spokesperson for Emergency Management and Recovery; Spokesperson for the Natural Hazards Commission; Spokesperson for Sport and Recreation; Spokesperson for Forestry; Spokesperson for Māori Economy
21	Glen Bennett	Chief Whip; Spokesperson for Tourism and Hospitality
22	Tracey McLellan	Junior Whip; Spokesperson for Corrections; Spokesperson for Christchurch Issues
23	Hon Jenny Salesa	Spokesperson for Ethnic Communities; Spokesperson for Customs; Associate Spokesperson for Pacific Peoples
24	Arena Williams	Spokesperson for Commerce and Consumer Affairs; Spokesperson for Building and Construction; Spokesperson for Youth
25	Hon Phil Twyford	Spokesperson for Immigration; Spokesperson for Disarmament and Arms Control; Associate Spokesperson for Foreign Affairs
26	Greg O'Connor	Assistant Speaker of the House of Representatives; Spokesperson for Courts; Spokesperson for Veterans
27	Rachel Boyack	Spokesperson for Oceans and Fisheries; Spokesperson for Arts, Culture and Heritage; Spokesperson for Animal Welfare
28	Shanan Halbert	Spokesperson for Tertiary Education; Spokesperson for Whānau Ora
29	Helen White	Spokesperson for the Community and Voluntary Sector; Spokesperson for Prevention of Family and Sexual Violence
30	Ingrid Leary	Spokesperson for Seniors; Spokesperson for Mental Health
31	Lemauga Lydia Sosene	Spokesperson for Internal Affairs; Spokesperson for Statistics
32	Georgie Dansey	Spokesperson for Rainbow Issues; Spokesperson for Regulation
33	Dan Rosewarne	Spokesperson for Rural Communities; Spokesperson for Small Business
34	Hon Duncan Webb	

== Policies ==
=== Broadcast and media ===
- A streaming levy on foreign streaming companies like Netflix in order to invest in the New Zealand film industry.

=== Commerce ===
- Small business policies: promising faster invoice payments, tax relief on new equipment and reduced compliance costs.
- Banning major companies from charging excessive prices for goods and services.
- Forcing the two supermarket giants Foodstuffs and Woolworths New Zealand to separate their retail and wholesale operations to help small grocers and promote competition.
- "Fair go law": proposed ban on businesses from charging surprise fees, "worthless" insurance, hard to cancel subscriptions and "unreasonable" exit fees across a range of products and services.
- Consumer rights: Introducing On 5 October, Labour pledged to introduce a "right to repair" car manufacturing policy and strengthen scrutiny of fuel prices to combat overpricing.
- Banking: making it easier to establish new banking companies to compete with major Australian-owned banks including ANZ Bank New Zealand, ASB Bank, Bank of New Zealand and Westpac New Zealand.
- Aviation: Forcing airlines to advertise their "real prices" and to compensate passengers for cancelled flights or significant changes to travel itineraries.

=== Defence ===
- Opposition to New Zealand entering the non-nuclear component of the AUKUS alliance.

=== Education ===
- Reinstating school boards' Treaty of Waitangi obligations, reversing the National-led coalition government's curriculum changes, mandated testing and so-called "politicisation of the education system."
- Restoring the Apprenticeship Boost training scheme back to two years from 2028. Expanding the programme to include trades such as road construction, water treatment and hairdressing.
- Pausing some of the National-led government's education policies including its plans to abolish the National Certificate of Educational Achievement (NCEA).
- Create an independent body for reviewing the school curriculum and subjects.
- Eliminating 10 percent of eligible student loans at a cost of $583.4 million over the next four years.
- Restoring locally-made school lunches and rural school bus routes.
- School uniforms: Reducing the cost of school uniforms by limiting the number of branded uniform items families must buy, and offering more retailers to stock them.
- Teacher aides: Hiring 1,000 more teacher aides at a cost of $80 million over the next four years.

=== Employment and labour ===
- Pay equity: Restoring the former pay equity regime. Labour promised to immediately pay 65,000 care and support workers over the next four years, costed at $2.5 billion.
- International music tours: Requiring international musicians touring New Zealand to include a local supporting act in order to support the New Zealand music industry.

=== Energy ===
- Solar energy: Introducing subsidy and loan schemes to reduce the cost of installing solar technology in homes, including low and middle-income households.

=== Finance ===
- "NZ Future Fund" policy: seeks to stimulate economic investment in New Zealand and is modelled after Singapore's Temasek fund.
- Fiscal strategy: Six policies including aiming to achieve a surplus by 2029/2030, reducing debt to 20 percent of gross domestic product (GDP), keeping core Government expenditure and revenue at 33 percent of GDP, establishing an independent Parliamentary Budget Office to scrutinise government spending and election commitments, restoring the Reserve Bank of New Zealand's dual mandate and well-being reporting.

=== Foreign affairs and trade ===
- Extending diplomatic recognition to the State of Palestine.
- Banning imports from Israeli settlements, following a precedent set by the United Kingdom, France and Canada.
- Supporting the Government's New Zealand–India Free Trade Agreement's passage into law.
- Respect for international law including the United Nations Charter.
- Imposing economic sanctions on Israel and supporting South Africa's genocide case against Israel.
- Maintaining an "independent, principled and unafraid" foreign policy while balancing relations with the United States and China.

=== Health ===
- Free cervical cancer screenings for all women aged between 25 and 69 years. This scheme is estimated to cost NZ$21.6 million and would be funded through health baselines.
- Offering doctors and nurse practitioners low-interest loans to set up new practices or buy into existing ones.
- Free maternity scans as part of their proposed "Medicard" programme.
- Improving the quality of services in hospital emergency departments including shorter wait times.

=== Housing ===
- Raising the Crown guarantee for community housing builders' social bonds.
- Maintaining the Government's interest deductibility rules for landlords, who would instead be covered by a capital gains tax.
- Social housing policy: banning "no-cause" evictions, making rental homes warmer and safer and strengthening tenancy rights.

=== Immigration ===
- Extending visa-free travel to Pacific Island Forum member states.

=== Infrastructure ===
- Supporting the National-led government's Infrastructure Investment Summit, which was held in Auckland on 13 March 2025. Labour's finance spokesperson Barbara Edmonds gave a speech, titled "Investing in New Zealanders," advocating "inclusive and sustainable development" that benefitted New Zealanders. Despite this bipartisan approach to investment, Hipkins has indicated that Labour would not support the privatisation of health and education buildings.
- Investing NZ$4 billion in building at least 6,000 homes, improving classrooms, repairing hospitals and job creation over the next four years.
- Invest NZ$4 billion over the next four years in building new social housing, improving classrooms, repairing hospitals and job creation.

=== Internet and social media regulation ===
- Pledge to progress an under-16 social media ban to select committee level within the first 100 days of being elected into government.

=== Justice and lawmaking ===
- Repealing the contentious Regulatory Standards Act 2025 within its first 100 days of assuming government.
- Supporting the National Party's bipartisan legislation banning modern slavery.
- Scrapping the Government's "Military Style Academies" for youth offenders.
- Introducing a corporate homicide offence into law.

=== Sports and recreation ===
- Allocate $7 million a year into sports and recreational programmes for children and youths to combat Internet addiction.

=== Superannuation ===
- Superannuation policies: making employer contributions to KiwiSaver compulsory, raising the minimum employee contribution to six percent, maintaining KiwiSaver contributions when parents undergo maternity leave, and banning new total renumeration contracts that absorb superannuation contributions from employees into salaries.
- Supporting a cross-party accord on the future of superannuation policies.

=== Taxation ===
- Introducing a capital gains tax to subsidise three free doctors' visits a year. This would target 28% of property transactions while excluding the family home, farms and wealth.
- Introducing tax subsidies to support the domestic video game industry.

=== Transportation ===
- Capping public transport fees in Auckland, Wellington and Christchurch at $20 per week from July 2027. Capping transport fees in other regions and centres at $10 per week. While Labour estimated that its proposed public fares subsidy would cost $65 million a year, the economists Sam Warburton and Brad Olsen estimated that the programme would cost between $91 million and $112 million.
