= Casey Costello =

New Zealand politician

The Honourable Casey Costello MP
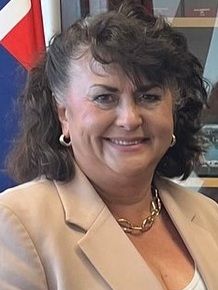
- Costello in 2024

67th Minister of Customs
- Incumbent
- Assumed office 27 November 2023
- Prime Minister: Christopher Luxon
- Preceded by: Jo Luxton

15th Minister for Seniors
- Incumbent
- Assumed office 27 November 2023
- Prime Minister: Christopher Luxon
- Preceded by: Ginny Andersen

Member of the New Zealand Parliament for New Zealand First party list
- Incumbent
- Assumed office 14 October 2023

Personal details
- Born: 1965 or 1966 (age 60–61)
- Party: New Zealand First (2022–present)
- Other political affiliations: ACT (2011); New Conservatives Party (2019–2022)
- Profession: Company manager

Cassandra Jane "Casey" Costello (born 1965 or 1966) is a New Zealand politician, lobbyist and former police officer. She was elected to the New Zealand House of Representatives, representing the New Zealand First party, in the 2023 New Zealand general election. She was appointed Minister of Customs, Minister for Seniors and Associate Minister of Health in the Sixth National Government of New Zealand.

== Early life and career ==
Costello's parents are racing journalist John Costello and New Zealand tennis representative Maryann Davis. She is one of six children. She is of Māori, Scottish and Irish descent. Her father's ancestors were British settlers who arrived in New Zealand in 1860. Her iwi affiliations, through her mother, are Ngātiwai, Ngāti Hau and Ngāpuhi; she is a relative of former politicians Kelvin Davis and Hone Harawira.

Costello's secondary schooling was at Marcellin College, Auckland. After leaving school, Costello worked in an ice cream parlour and also as a reporter with her father at the Counties Sport and News newspaper. In a 2023 interview, she stated that working as a crime reporter inspired her to join the New Zealand Police, which she did in 1986. Her fourteen-year, Auckland-based policing career included working the 1992 Schlaepfer family murders and a period as vice-president of the police union, being the first woman elected to that role.

She later became a security specialist and building services company manager in Auckland. In the 2000s, she was Parliament's manager of security and operations, overseeing a security upgrade.

== Lobbyist career ==
From 2016, Costello was a founding trustee of Hobson's Pledge with former ACT New Zealand leader Don Brash. Hobson's Pledge is a right-wing lobby group that disputes some constitutional powers of the Treaty of Waitangi and aims to nullify the partnership between the Crown and Māori. Costello was a prominent spokesperson for the lobby group. Costello's view is that any policies seeking to redress historical injustices against Māori are "racist and separatist." She campaigned against the creation of the Australian Indigenous Voice to Parliament at the 2023 referendum, writing in The Spectator Australia that New Zealand's equivalent to the Voice had "divided" New Zealanders.

Costello has also been involved in the New Zealand Taxpayers' Union, a right-wing lobby group, including as board chair. She resigned from the board so that she could stand in the 2023 general election. Costello is also a trustee of the Migrant Exploitation Relief Foundation, pushing for investigation of the exploitation of illegal immigrants.

== Political career ==
New Zealand Parliament
Years	Term	Electorate	List	Party
2023–2026	54th	List	3	NZ First
2026–present	55th	List	3	NZ First

=== Early political career ===
Costello first stood for parliament in 2011. Her brother, Dominic Costello, was the ACT New Zealand candidate in Te Atatū in the 2011 general election and encouraged her to stand for the party also. She contested the Māngere electorate and was ranked 34th on the party list, but was not elected.

In 2019, Costello was involved with the New Conservatives Party. She joined the party's board at the beginning of 2019, as did David Moffett.

=== 2023 general election ===
Three years later, Costello later shifted her party affiliation and was selected by New Zealand First to contest the Port Waikato electorate at the 2023 election. She was ranked third on the party list. At the New Zealand First conference where her candidacy was announced, Costello submitted a proposal that it should be party policy to remove the “exclusive authority of the Waitangi Tribunal to determine the meaning and effect” of the Treaty of Waitangi, along with other suggested changes to the Tribunal's authority. The proposal was approved, with the support of senior New Zealand First figures Winston Peters and Shane Jones. Costello also identified the removal of the Māori Health Authority as one of the first things she would like to accomplish if elected.

Costello was elected to parliament as a list MP on 14 October 2023, based on New Zealand First's 6.08% share of the party vote. The electorate vote in Port Waikato was cancelled on 9 October 2023 after ACT candidate Neil Christensen died. Costello was automatically renominated for the Port Waikato by-election held on 25 November 2023. Costello came second place in the by-election, gaining 2,864 votes.

=== First term, 2023–2026 ===
New Zealand First formed a coalition government with the National Party and ACT New Zealand. In late November 2023, Costello was appointed Minister of Customs, Minister for Seniors, and an associate minister in the health, immigration and police portfolios in the coalition government.

==== Associate health ====
As Associate Minister of Health, Costello is responsible for the government's policies on tobacco smoking, including the proposed repeal of the Smokefree Environments and Regulated Products (Smoked Tobacco) Amendment Act 2022, which would have restricted tobacco sales.

On 25 January 2024, Radio New Zealand (RNZ) reported that Costello had proposed a three year freeze on Consumer Price Index-related excise increases for smoked tobacco and removing the excise tax from smokeless tobacco products. Costello has denied having any links to the tobacco industry. Costello also proposed harsher penalties for selling vaping products to minors, including a NZ$30,000 fine for selling vapes to minors. Costello has disagreed with a prohibition on tobacco, instead advocating the decriminalisation of oral nicotine products such as snus and chewing tobacco.

Costello's proposed three-year tobacco tax freeze was criticised by Labour's health spokesperson Ayesha Verrall and anti-smoking advocates Health Coalition Aotearoa co-chairperson Boyd Swinburn, Asthma and Respiratory Foundation NZ chief executive Letitia Harding, Health Aotearoa Commission co-chairperson Leitu Tufuga, and Action on Smoking and Health (ASH) director Ben Youden as detrimental to efforts to combat smoking and improve public health.

In response to criticism, Health Minister Shane Reti expressed confidence in Costello's role as Associate Health Minister and reaffirmed the Government's commitment to reducing smoking rates and tobacco consumption. Luxon subsequently stated that Costello was only exploring smoking policy health options and has made a mistake during an interview. He also expressed confidence in Costello and confirmed that the Government would not pause increases to the tobacco tax. However, notes that Costello sent to health officials on reforming smoke free laws make it clear that a proposed freeze on excise tax for tobacco came from her office. The notes made the case that the tobacco industry is in real financial trouble, claiming "The tobacco industry in New Zealand is on its knees" and comparing the harm from nicotine to the harm from coffee, claiming "Nicotine is as harmful as caffeine.

On 27 February 2024, Costello confirmed that the Government would introduce the Smokefree Environments and Regulated Products Amendment Bill under urgency to repeal the three components of the Smokefree legislation: the retail reduction scheme, de-nicotisation and the smokefree generation measures. The Smokefree Amendment Bill passed its third reading on 28 February 2024. During the first reading, Costello described Labour's Smokefree policy as an "untested regime" focusing on prohibition and said the Government wanted a "practical, workable, and tested approach" to tobacco. She also claimed that vaping could help reduce tobacco addiction and reiterated the Government's commitment to combating smoking. Labour leader Chris Hipkins accused Costello of regurgitating the tobacco industry's talking points.

On 20 March 2024, Costello announced that the Government would introduce legislation to ban disposable vapes, and increase the maximum fine from selling to under-18s from $10,000 to $100,000.

On 11 July 2024, Costello was rebuked by the Chief Ombudsman Judge Peter Boshier and ordered to apologise to public broadcaster RNZ and University of Otago public health professor Janet Hoek for failing to provide them with Official Information Act (OIA) information about the Government's tobacco and vaping policies. Boshier said withholding the information was "unreasonable and contrary to law".

On 18 July, Casey Costello slashed the excise rate on heated tobacco products (HTPs) by 50 percent as part of a trial to reduce smoking rates. The Ministry of Health expressed disagreement, stating "there is no evidence to support HTPs use as a quit smoking tool".

On 19 September 2024, Costello was reprimanded again by the Chief Ombudsman Boshier for her handling of a mystery document containing tobacco-industry friendly ideas, which she passed to health officials to develop policy. On 3 October, Costello released five documents which constituted her "independent advice" on heated tobacco products. These documents did not support her premise that HTPs were an alternative to smoking.

On 21 October 2024, Costello announced that ambulance provider Hato Hone St John would receive an additional NZ$21 million in government funding. On 24 October, the Ministry of Health apologised to Costello after failing to inform her that one of its officials advising her on tobacco reform was the sister-in-law of Labour's health spokesperson Ayesha Verrall, which constituted a conflict of interest. NZ First leader Winston Peters and Prime Minister Christopher Luxon criticised the Health Ministry for not following its protocols.

As Associate Health Minister, Costello sponsored legislation in mid-December 2024 repealing the previous Labour Government's Therapeutic Products Act 2023, which would have increased regulatory oversight over therapeutic and medical products from 2026.

In mid April 2025, Radio New Zealand reported that Costello had directed Health New Zealand in late March 2025 to use "clear language" in its communications about health issues. Costello had stated: "Recent documents that have reached my office from the Ministry of Health have referred to women as 'pregnant people', 'people with a cervix' or 'individuals capable of childbearin' [sic]. Only women and people of the female sex can get pregnant and birth a child no matter how they identify." Costello's directive was criticised by Victoria University of Wellington senior lecturer George Parker and The Spinoff editor Madeleine Chapman for rolling back the use of "inclusive language" in official health communications.

In November 2025, Costello defended New Zealand's sharp decline in the Global Tobacco Industry Interference Index, which saw the country fall from second place in 2023 to 53rd. The report cited the government's repeal of the smokefree generation laws, a tax concession benefiting Philip Morris, and the movement of staff between politics and lobbying as factors in the drop. Costello called the index "ridiculous" and “absolutely ludicrous," saying she had been transparent in all dealings and that the comparison with higher-smoking countries was "nonsense." She maintained that the country still had one of the world's lowest smoking rates and described the Smokefree 2025 target as ambitious but achievable.

==== Customs and associate immigration ====
On 10 May 2025, Costello announced that the Government would allocate NZ$35 million from the 2025 New Zealand budget into combating drug smuggling, improving supply chain security and expanding the New Zealand Customs Service's overseas presence.

On 22 May 2026, Costello announced that the Government would allocate $70 million from the 2026 New Zealand budget to purchasing three new unmanned underwater vehicles (UUVs) for combating maritime smuggling. These UUVS will conduct checks below the waterline, reducing the need for diving crews.

On 24 June 2026, Costello announced that the Community Organisation Refugee Sponsorship scheme would be made permanent from July 2026 and also expanded to 200 spaces per year from 2027.

==== Associate police ====
On 20 February 2025, Costello announced that the Government had appointed an Advisory Group to combat transnational and serious organised crime in New Zealand. She said that the Advisory Group would operate for eight months and be funded through the proceeds of crime fund. The Advisory Group consisted of Meredith Connell senior partner Steve Symon, Craig Hamilton, John Tims and sociologist Jarrod Gilbert. On 9 April, the Advisory Group released its first report to Costello, warning that New Zealand was vulnerable to the increased presence of organised crime groups from China, Southeast Asia, Latin America and Australia including New Zealand 501 deportees from Australia. On 10 June, the Advisory Group released a third report warning that growing criminal networks in New Zealand made the country more vulnerable to corruption and "insider threats." In response, Costello expressed surprise that New Zealand was the only Five Eyes country to lack an anti-corruption strategy.

==== Seniors ====
In May 2025, Labour spokesperson for Seniors Ingrid Leary accused Costello of being "missing in action" in her role as Minister for Seniors, citing responses to Official Information Act requests and written parliamentary questions showing that she had not taken any papers under the Seniors portfolio to Cabinet between late 2023 and March 2025. Leary also noted that Costello had issued only one press release in the role and argued that she had done more to support the tobacco industry than to advance the interests of older New Zealanders.

Costello rejected the claims, saying they reflected a "shallow understanding" of the portfolio. She argued that the Office for Seniors is a small agency that does not typically generate Cabinet papers, and that much of the Seniors work programme involves cross-government coordination, including planning for aged-care improvements, changes enabling subsidiary dwellings, and the review of the Retirement Villages Act. Costello said older New Zealanders could be assured that all commitments to them in the NZ First–National coalition agreement would be delivered.

In October 2025, Costello responded to the release of Care in Crisis, a major NZ Nurses Organisation report based on interviews with aged-care workers that alleged widespread understaffing, missed care, and instances of neglect in residential aged-care facilities. The report described a sector "in crisis", citing inadequate staffing levels, delayed wound care, rationed incontinence products, rushed hygiene assistance, and unmet emotional and social needs. Costello disputed the findings, saying the accounts "paint a very distorted picture" and did not reflect the reality of most aged-care services. She argued the sector was not in crisis, highlighting $270 million in additional government funding over the preceding two years and stating that facilities she had visited were committed to high-quality care. Costello said broader reforms were underway, including work on a new system-level aged-care model and a forthcoming strategic vision for the sector.

=== Second term, 2026–present ===
During the 2026 New Zealand general election scheduled for 7 November, Costello contested the Port Waikato electorate for NZ First. She was ranked third place on the party list. Based on preliminary results, Costello came third place in the Port Waikato race with 4,334 votes. She was re-elected to Parliament on the NZ First party list.

== Personal life ==
In mid-April 2025, Costello was verbally accosted by former Te Pāti Māori candidate Pere Huriwai-Seger at a Wellsford food court, who justified his actions by alleging that bullying was allowed to happen in Parliament. This incident followed an earlier incident in which fellow NZ First MP Shane Jones's wife Dot Jones being allegedly assaulted at Auckland Airport and a report into increased harassment of female politicians.
