= Responses to the COVID-19 pandemic in July 2022 =

Aspect of viral disease pandemic

This article documents the chronology of the response to the COVID-19 pandemic in July 2022, which originated in Wuhan, China in December 2019. Some developments may become known or fully understood only in retrospect. Reporting on this pandemic began in December 2019.

== Reactions and measures in the Western Pacific ==
=== 1 July ===
- Health authorities in Niue have tested passengers on a flight from New Zealand and launched contact tracing after five passengers tested positive for COVID-19.

=== 14 July ===
On 15 July, New Zealand's COVID-19 Response Minister Ayesha Verrall announced that the Government would provide free masks and rapid antigen test kits. In addition, the New Zealand Government would make it easier for vulnerable patients to obtain a range of drugs including paxlovid, molnupiravir, and remdesivir.

== See also ==
- Timeline of the COVID-19 pandemic in July 2022
- Responses to the COVID-19 pandemic
