= Peter Fritz =

Australian businessman (born 1943)

Peter Fritz AO
- Peter Fritz
- Born: 4 January 1943 (age 83); Arad, Romania
- Education: University of Technology, Sydney
- Known for: Entrepreneur, businessman
- Title: Officer of the Order of Australia
- Board member of: Chair Small Business Council of Australia (1992–1995), Chair OECD SME Working Party (1993), Chair AGCCKC
- Website: www.tcg.net.au

Peter Adalbert Robert George Fritz AO (born 4 January 1943) is an Australian businessman and philanthropist. He was born in Arad, Romania and migrated to Australia in 1962. He has been Group managing director of the TCG Group of Companies since 1971 and chairman of institute for active policy Global Access Partners since 1997.

== Career ==
Peter is a co-founder of over 100 companies and several business accelerators, including Australia's oldest Australian-owned IT company, TCG. TCG Group is a group of businesses which over the last 50 years have produced many innovative solutions. They produced solutions in computer and communication technologies, data transmission, management structures and the food industry, including VOIP telephony (1998); design and manufacturing of plastic note sorting machines (1995); lottery ticket validation terminal (1988); mirror microwave communication technology and CT3 technology, first in the world (1986); BOW Memory unit for cash registers (1985); credit card validation system (pioneer technology in secure transmission) and MOX memory unit for building security (1984); low-cost fossil fuel power station simulator (1983); the first echo-free, hands-free telephone handset (1978); and online stock control system – the first real-time system in commercial use (1972).

Peter was a member of the board that led the development of the Australian Technology Park in 1991–1997. In 1998, the ATP Board established the National Incubator Companies Board which Peter chaired. He also co-founded the Joint Technology Partners incubator – a large investor in Australian technology start-ups.

In 1993, some of the 65 companies in the TCG Group were publicly floated on the Australian Stock Exchange as TechComm Group Limited, later renamed Utility Computer Services (UXC). In 2016, UXC was acquired by CSC for $430 million. Another former TCG company floated on the New York Stock Exchange in November 1997 for US$600m (AU$1 billion), making it the largest technology company to be established in Australia until that time. By 2010, the TCG companies, and entities with TCG roots, employ well over 6000 people with a turnover in excess of $1.5 billion annually. Today, the TCG Group encompasses some 50 companies with assets in the hundreds of millions of dollars.

Peter holds seven degrees and professional qualifications, and is an honorary member of the Hungarian Academy of Engineering 1998. He is a fellow of the Australian Computer Society, the Institute of Engineers Australia, and the Australian Society of Accountants. His many awards include a Member (AM, 1993) and an Officer (AO, 2020) of the Order of Australia (2020 Australia Day Honours), as well as the UTS Alumni Award for Excellence 2010. His books include 'The Possible Dream' (Penguin 1988), 'Beyond "Yes"' (HarperCollins 1998), 'The Profit Principle' co-authored by Jeanne-Vida Douglas (John Wiley and Sons 2010), 'Managing for Change' co-authored by Brad Howarth (TCG Publications 2014), 'Innovation is for Everyone' co-authored by Brad Howarth (TCG Publications 2019). and 'Times and Lives' co-authored by Marianne Szegedy-Maszak (Open Books 2023).

Peter chairs the Australian Government Consultative Committee on Knowledge Capital and serves on a number of private enterprise boards. He represented Australia on the OECD Small Medium Size Enterprise committee and is an active participant in OECD forums. As Chair of the Australian Government Small and Medium Sized Business Council, together with Prof Jennifer Davis, Peter was instrumental in the introduction of mediation into the Australian legal system.

Peter co-chaired the government-commissioned Working Group on Education and Training in Philanthropy and Social Investment (2007–2008) which led to the establishment of the Centre for Social Impact (CSI) in 2008, a national centre for philanthropy and social investment, with an Australian Government endowment of $12.4 million. The CSI is a joint collaboration between the business schools of the University of New South Wales, Melbourne Business School, Swinburne University of Technology and the University of Western Australia and provides managerial education, executive support and research for the not-for-profit sector.

Peter led the establishment of the OECD Working Party on SMEs and Entrepreneurship (1993), International Centre for Democratic Partnerships (2017), Society for Knowledge Economics (2005), Australian Society for Progress and Wellbeing (2014), National Small Business Centre (1992), International Institute for Negotiation and Conflict Management (1996), and many others.

Peter is a regular blogger on the issues of innovation and entrepreneurship on Open Forum (Australia).

== See also ==
- Catherine Fritz-Kalish, Australian Co-founder of Global Access Partners (GAP)
