= Centre for Social Impact =

Australian research collaboration across four universities

The Centre for Social Impact is an Australian research and education body created in 2008. It assesses and promotes integrated social change across a range of issues including health, children and young people, ageing and disability, financial inclusion and employment, population diversity and mobility, education and housing.

CSI was founded to meet the main recommendation of a Global Access Partners taskforce on philanthropy in higher education co-chaired by Peter Fritz AO and Professor Ian Young (academic) AO. Its inaugural CEO was Peter Shergold AC. As of 2022, the centre is headed by Arminé Nalbandian. It is a collaboration of academics and researchers based at four universities: UNSW Sydney, New South Wales; Swinburne University of Technology in Melbourne, Victoria; The University of Western Australia in Perth, Western Australia; and (since 2022) Flinders University in Adelaide, South Australia.

CSI is funded by an Australian Government endowment of A$12.5 million and matching funds from private partners, including the Macquarie Group Foundation, AMP, National Australia Bank and PwC.

CSI has worked with government agencies, commercial firms and not-for-profit organisations on over 30 research projects and has developed an extensive post-graduate program as part of its work in assessing the social impact of government and philanthropic activities. Its projects include a map of Australia's "Social Pulse" to assess national progress on social issues.
