= Minister for Seniors =

New Zealand minister of the Crown

- Coat of Arms of New Zealand

- Flag of New Zealand

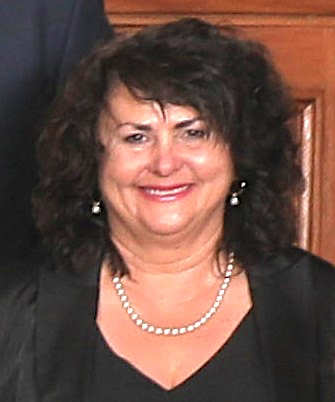
- Incumbent; Casey Costello since 27 November 2023
- Ministry of Social Development
- Style: The Honourable
- Member of: Cabinet of New Zealand; Executive Council
- Reports to: Prime Minister of New Zealand
- Appointer: Governor-General of New Zealand
- Term length: At His Majesty's pleasure
- Inaugural holder: Margaret Shields
- Formation: 24 July 1990
- Salary: $288,900
- Website: www.beehive.govt.nz

The Minister for Seniors is a minister in the New Zealand Government with responsibility for the rights and interests of senior citizens.

The post was established by the Fourth Labour Government on 24 July 1990. It was split from the Social Welfare portfolio.

== History ==
The following ministers have held the office of Minister for Seniors.

Key

Labour National NZ First

No.	Name	Portrait	Term of Office		Prime Minister
1	Margaret Shields		24 July 1990	2 November 1990	Palmer
1	Margaret Shields		24 July 1990	2 November 1990	Moore
2	Graeme Lee		2 November 1990	3 October 1991	Bolger
3	Wyatt Creech		3 October 1991	29 November 1993	Bolger
4	Peter Gresham		29 November 1993	16 December 1996	Bolger
5	Robyn McDonald		16 December 1996	31 August 1998	Bolger
5	Robyn McDonald		16 December 1996	31 August 1998	Shipley
6	David Carter		31 August 1998	10 December 1999	Shipley
7	Lianne Dalziel		10 December 1999	28 January 2003	Clark
8	Ruth Dyson		28 January 2003	19 November 2008	Clark
9	John Carter		19 November 2008	8 June 2011	Key
10	Craig Foss		8 June 2011	14 December 2011	Key
11	Jo Goodhew		14 December 2011	8 October 2014	Key
12	Maggie Barry		8 October 2014	26 October 2017	Key
12	Maggie Barry		8 October 2014	26 October 2017	English
13	Tracey Martin		26 October 2017	6 November 2020	Ardern
14	Ayesha Verrall		6 November 2020	1 February 2023	Ardern
14	Ayesha Verrall		6 November 2020	1 February 2023	Hipkins
15	Ginny Andersen		1 February 2023	27 November 2023	Hipkins
16	Casey Costello		27 November 2023	present	Luxon
