= Ginny Andersen =

New Zealand politician (born 1975)

The Honourable Ginny Andersen MP
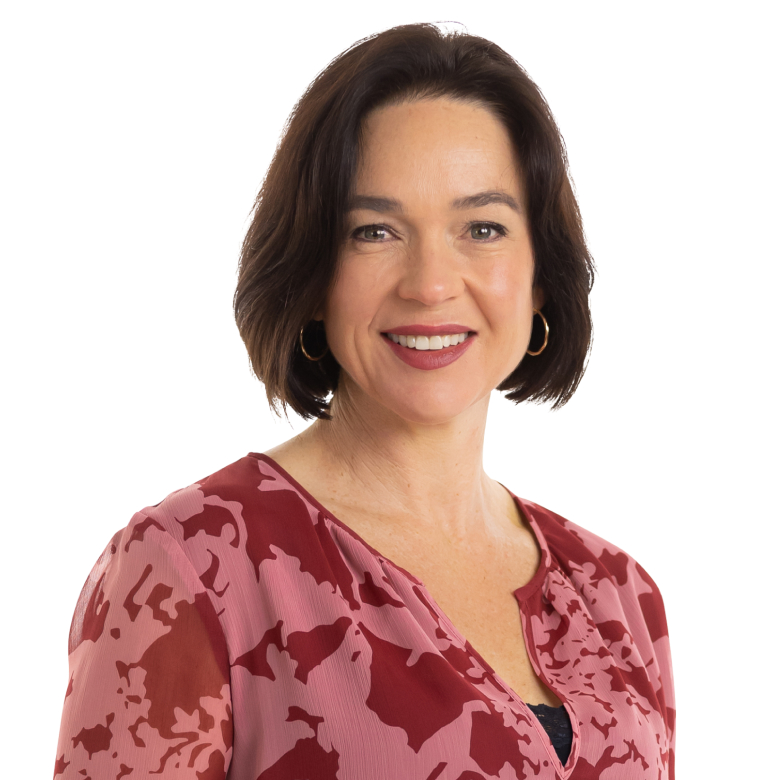
- Andersen in 2023

52nd Minister of Justice
- In office 24 July 2023 – 27 November 2023
- Prime Minister: Chris Hipkins
- Preceded by: Kiri Allan
- Succeeded by: Paul Goldsmith

42nd Minister of Police
- In office 20 March 2023 – 27 November 2023
- Prime Minister: Chris Hipkins
- Preceded by: Megan Woods
- Succeeded by: Mark Mitchell

2nd Minister for the Digital Economy and Communications
- In office 1 February 2023 – 27 November 2023
- Prime Minister: Chris Hipkins
- Preceded by: David Clark
- Succeeded by: Judith Collins

14th Minister for Seniors
- In office 1 February 2023 – 27 November 2023
- Prime Minister: Chris Hipkins
- Preceded by: Ayesha Verrall
- Succeeded by: Casey Costello

Member of the New Zealand Parliament
- Incumbent
- Assumed office 23 September 2017
- Constituency: List (2023–present); Hutt South (2020–23); List (2017–20)

Personal details
- Born: 1975 (age 50–51) New Zealand
- Party: Labour
- Spouse: Geoff Gwyn
- Relations: Bill Andersen (great-uncle)
- Children: 4
- Education: University of Canterbury
- Website: Labour Party profile

Virginia Ruby Andersen (born 1975) is a New Zealand politician. She has been a Member of Parliament in the House of Representatives for the Labour Party since the 2017 New Zealand general election.

Andersen held the offices of Minister of Police and Minister of Justice in the final months of the Sixth Labour Government.

== Early life and career ==
Andersen was born in 1975. Her parents were both teachers at low-decile schools around the country and her childhood was spent all over New Zealand including Great Barrier Island, Hawke's Bay, Wairarapa before settling in Christchurch where she attended Phillipstown School and later Avonside Girls' High School. Her high school principal was Marian Hobbs, who later became a cabinet minister under Helen Clark. Bill Andersen, a noted activist and trade union leader, was her great-uncle.

While living in the Christchurch suburb of Linwood, Anderson became aware of the negative social impacts of gangs and drugs which were present in the area. She "grew up with kids whose parents were on methadone" and "had friends who took their life at a really young age because the parents were ... addict[s]".

After leaving school, she studied political science and Māori at the University of Canterbury, becoming fluent in te reo Māori, before spending three years travelling overseas. On her return to New Zealand, she continued her studies completing a master's degree in political science in 2004. Her thesis addressed indigenous self-determination based on the Crown's Treaty settlement with Ngai Tahu.

Following that, she worked at the Office of Treaty Settlements, and in 2004, became private secretary for Margaret Wilson on treaty negotiations. After that, she became a political adviser for David Cunliffe and then Trevor Mallard.

Andersen wanted a family, which she felt was incompatible with the long work hours in Parliament, so in 2006, took a job with the New Zealand Police. She was employed as a policy unit manager focussing on gang problems, and organised crime. She became a strategic adviser on Māori, Pacific and ethnic services with a focus on reducing Māori reoffending. When John Key became prime minister, she was seconded to the Department of the Prime Minister and Cabinet to work on the Methamphetamine Action Plan. She also worked on the government's Vehicle Confiscation and Seizure Bill which enabled vehicles owned by boy racers to be crushed. In a 2023 interview, Andersen stated that working under Key's National Party government as a public servant was her inspiration to run for election as a Labour candidate.

== Early political career ==
At the 2008 election Andersen was a campaign volunteer for her former Beehive colleague Chris Hipkins, who was the Labour candidate in the Remutaka electorate. Hipkins was successful. Andersen was his campaign manager for the 2011 election. She was selected as a Labour candidate for the 2014 election, running in the Ōhāriu electorate and placed 37 on the Labour Party list. She was not elected, but her loss to the long-standing incumbent, Peter Dunne of United Future, was by only 710 votes, the third lowest margin in the country.

Andersen became the Labour Party's vice-president in 2015. In October 2016, she was selected as Labour's candidate for the electorate of Hutt South for the 2017 general election over Hutt City Councillor Campbell Barry and list candidate Sarah Packer. She replaced long-serving member of parliament Trevor Mallard as the Labour Party candidate who had, in July of that year, said he would serve as a list-only candidate for the election with the intention of becoming Speaker of the House. She stood down from the party vice-presidency in 2017 to focus on her parliamentary candidacy.

== Member of Parliament ==
New Zealand Parliament
Years	Term	Electorate	List	Party
2017–2020	52nd	List	28	Labour
2020–2023	53rd	Hutt South	45	Labour
2023–2026	54th	List	17	Labour
2026–present	55th	Hutt South	12	Labour

=== Sixth Labour Government, 2017–2023 ===
While Andersen lost the Hutt South election to National Party candidate Chris Bishop, she entered parliament via the party list, ranked at 28 for Labour. In her first term, Andersen was a member of the justice committee and the deputy chair of the governance and administration committee.

Andersen was responsible for the Holidays (Bereavement Leave for Miscarriage) Amendment Bill, a private member's bill that proposed allowing people who have suffered a miscarriage with three days paid bereavement leave. The bill was selected for debate in 2018 and passed unanimously in 2021. The bill made New Zealand one of the first countries in the world to provide specific paid leave for miscarriage bereavements.

In September 2020, controversy arose over the unusual arrangements for Andersen's office space rented by the Labour Party in Hutt South. Rent for MPs' offices are paid by Parliamentary Services. However, a sublease arrangement, which had been in place for decades under Andersen's predecessor Trevor Mallard, meant that Parliamentary Services (using public money) were paying the Labour Party $6,000 per annum to cover the rent, but the Labour Party was only paying the landlord, the New Zealand Professional Firefighters Union (NZPFU), $1,500 a year. The $4,500 overpayment went to the Labour Party which used it for campaigning and other expenses. Once the arrangement became public, Andersen cancelled it.

At the 2020 New Zealand general election, Andersen was again Labour's candidate for Hutt South, and defeated National's Chris Bishop by 3,777 votes. In her second term, Andersen was appointed the chair of the justice committee.

On 31 January 2023, in a Cabinet reshuffle marking the appointment of Chris Hipkins as prime minister, Andersen was promoted into the Cabinet. She was named Minister for the Digital Economy and Communications, Minister for Small Business, Minister for Seniors, Associate Minister of Immigration and the Associate Minister for Treaty of Waitangi Negotiations. Andersen picked up two additional appointments following scandals involving two other ministers. She became Minister of Police on 20 March 2023 following the dismissal of Stuart Nash and Minister of Justice following Kiri Allan's resignation on 23 July 2023.

As minister, Andersen oversaw the progress of reforms related to digital identity, legal aid, and public safety. Her ministerial tenure came after incidents of ram-raiding burglaries increased 400% over five years. As small business and police minister, Andersen was involved in the rollout of fog cannons to protect small business owners and introduced new legislation that made ram-raiding an offence under the Crimes Act 1961. As small business minister, she chaired a meeting of the OECD committee on SMEs and entrepreneurship in Paris in June 2023.

=== Opposition, 2023–present ===
In the 2023 general election, Andersen lost her Hutt South seat to National Party candidate Chris Bishop by a margin of 1,332 votes, but was re-elected to Parliament as a list MP. Labour lost the election and Andersen was assigned opposition spokesperson roles in the police, prevention of family and sexual violence, social investment, and associate social development portfolios.

In early November 2023, Andersen was the subject of a Labour Party investigation after a complaint that she had bullied a female teenaged Labour Party volunteer over a period of three years. Andersen yelled at the female volunteer and her brother at a Labour Party Lower Hutt election night event on 14 October. According to the complaint, Andersen was angry that the teenager had not knocked on enough doors during the 2023 election campaign. Andersen subsequently issued a statement apologising for the hurt that her comments had caused and resolved to fully engage in the process to resolve the matter. On 13 November, Andersen apologised to the complainant and her daughter. That same day, Andersen was the subject of a second complaint by a male volunteer, who alleged Andersen had bullied and "bodyshamed" him. Andersen disputed the bullying allegations.

On 5 December 2023, Andersen was granted retention of the title The Honourable, in recognition of her term as a member of the Executive Council.

On 21 February 2024, Andersen attracted media attention for remarks she made about National MP and cabinet minister Mark Mitchell during a Newstalk ZB interview hosted by Mike Hosking. When Mitchell talked about his work as a private security contractor in Iraq in 2004, Andersen questioned the nature of his work and asked if he had been "paid to kill people." In response, Mitchell accused Andersen and the left of engaging in character assassination. Andersen then asked Mitchell if he kept a tally on the number of people he shot and alleged that Mitchell's former employer British security company Control Risks made $4 million a year. Mitchell described her remarks as outrageous and demanded an apology. Andersen initially refused to apologise on free speech grounds. Later, Labour Party leader Chris Hipkins expressed his disagreement with her comments. Andersen subsequently stated that her remarks "went too far" and also sent an apology text message to Mitchell.

In early March 2025, Andersen became part of a new economic team following a cabinet reshuffle, gaining the Jobs and Incomes portfolio. She retained the Police and Treaty of Waitangi Negotiations portfolios but lost the prevention of family and sexual violence, social investment and associate social development portfolios.

On 11 March 2026, Andersen gained the education portfolio while retaining the jobs and incomes, police and Treaty of Waitangi portfolios. In late April 2026, she announced that Labour would campaign on reinstating school boards' Treaty of Waitangi obligations during the 2026 New Zealand general election, reversing the current National-led coalition government's curriculum changes, mandated testing and so-called "politicisation of the education system."

On 15 September 2026, Speaker Gerry Brownlee ordered Andersen to leave the House of Representatives' debating chamber for heckling National MP Carl Bates during Question Time.

During the 2026 New Zealand general election, Andersen was ranked 12th on the Labour Party list. She contested the Hutt South electorate. On 7 November, Andersen unseated National MP Chris Bishop by a margin of 889 votes based on preliminary results.

== Personal life ==
Andersen lives in Belmont, Lower Hutt. She enjoys practising yoga. She is married to Geoff Gwyn, a former police inspector, whom she met while working for the Police prior to becoming an MP. They have two children together, and also parent her husband's two older children from a previous relationship.

Political offices
Preceded by Megan Woods	Minister of Police; 2023	Succeeded by Mark Mitchell
Preceded by Ayesha Verrall	Minister for Seniors; 2023	Succeeded by Casey Costello
Preceded by David Clark	Minister for the Digital Economy and Communications; 2023	Succeeded by Judith Collins
Preceded by Stuart Nash	Minister for Small Business; 2023	Succeeded by Melissa Lee
New Zealand Parliament
Preceded by Chris Bishop	Member of Parliament for Hutt South; 2020–2023	Succeeded by Chris Bishop
Party political offices
Preceded by Robert Gallagher	Vice-President of the New Zealand Labour Party; 2015–2017	Succeeded by Beth Houston
