= 2015 New Zealand First deputy leadership election =

2015 New Zealand First Party deputy leadership election
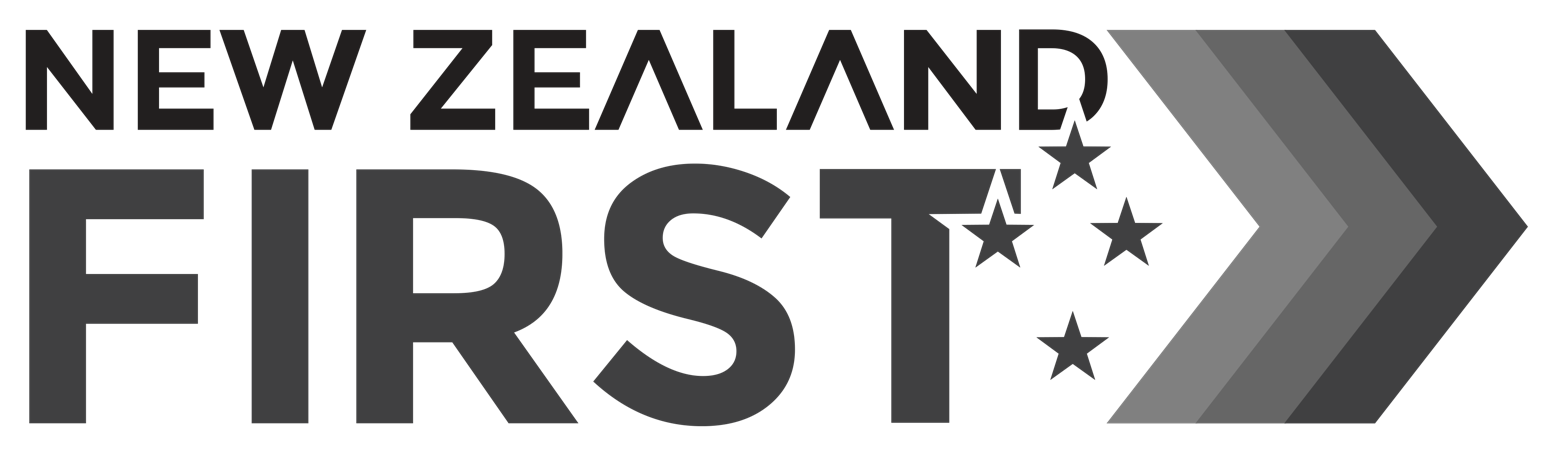
- 3 July 2015
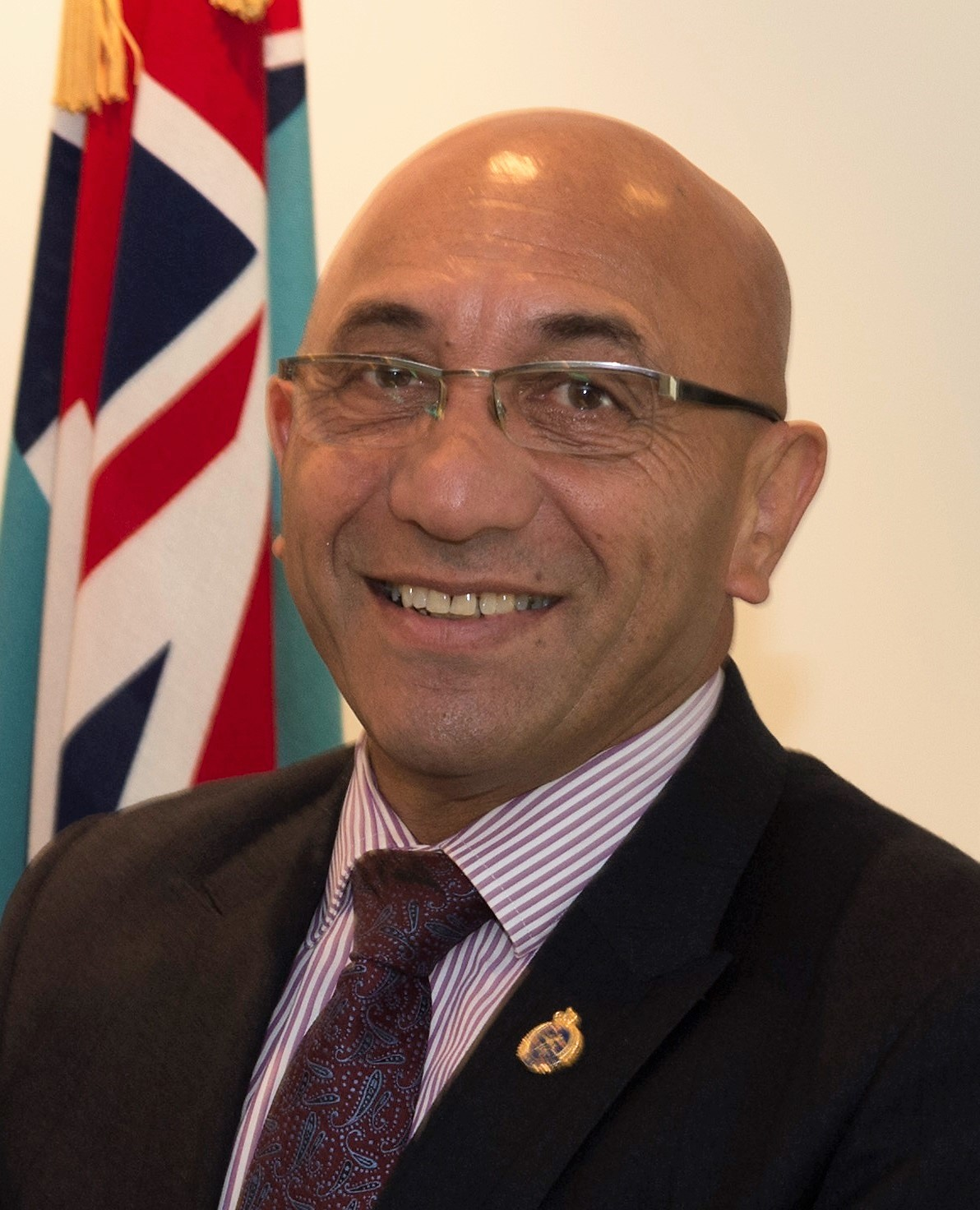

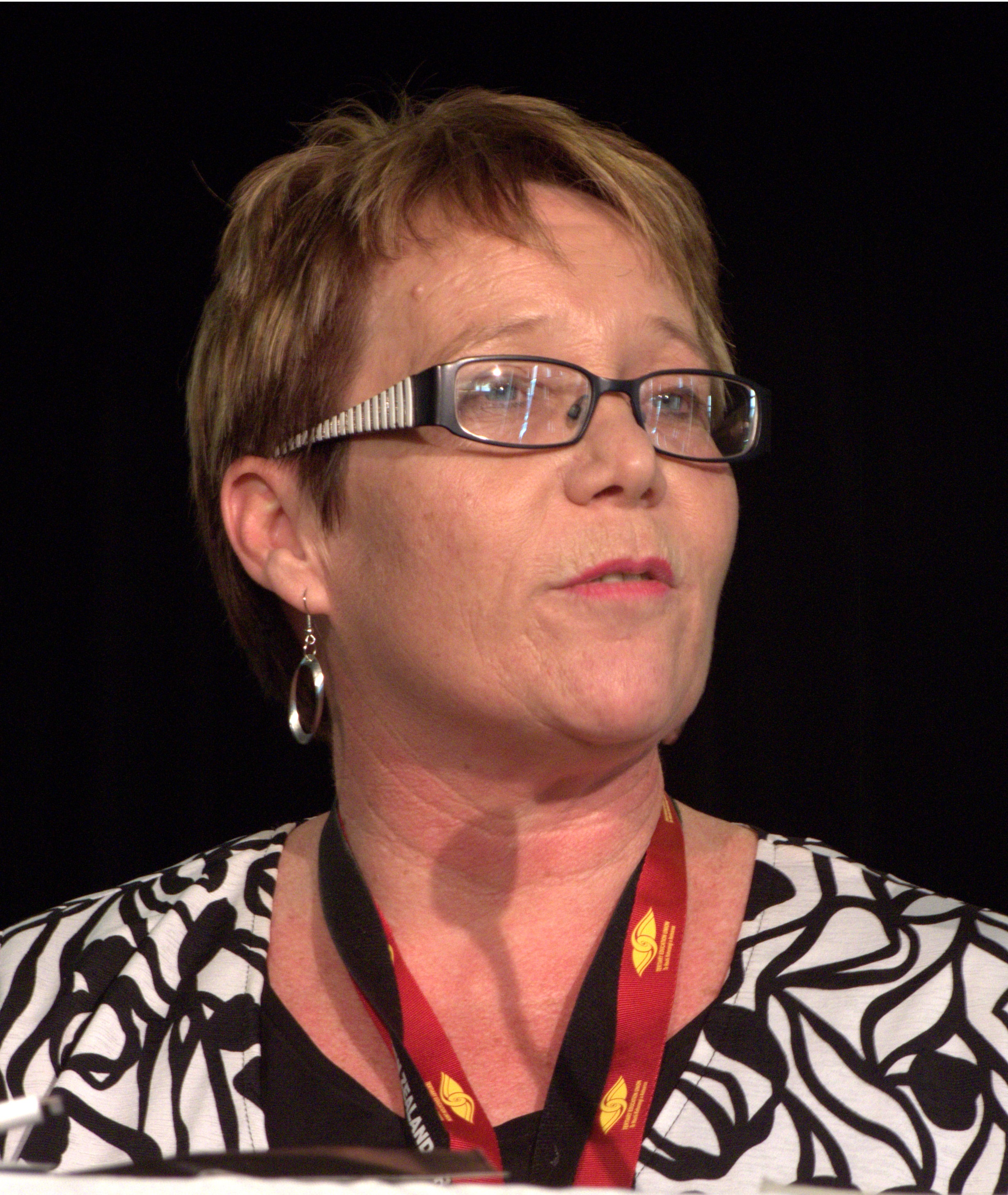
Candidate	Ron Mark	Tracey Martin
Popular vote	≥6	<6
Deputy Leader before election
Tracey Martin
Deputy Leader after election
Ron Mark

An election for the parliamentary deputy leadership of the New Zealand First Party took place in the NZ First Party parliamentary caucus on July 3, 2015. Incumbent deputy leader and sitting List MP, Tracey Martin was challenged for the position by fellow list MP Ron Mark. In the election Mark won the required number of votes and replaced Martin as deputy leader of the party.

== Background ==
Speculation that Mark would replace Martin as deputy leader of the party had been circulating since his return to Parliament at the 2014 New Zealand general election. On the first of July 2015 Mark publicly denied he was challenging Martin for the position, NZ First leader Winston Peters stated that leadership elections within the party were always held after general elections, although would not confirm whether he expected Martin to retain the position.

== Results ==
A deputy leadership election was held on July 3, with Mark gaining enough votes to replace Martin. While the way each MP voted has not been publicly released, it was later reported by media that Winston Peters likely voted for Martin and Richard Prosser for Mark.
