= Katrina Sharples =

New Zealand biostatistician

- Occupation: biostatistician

Academic background
- Education: University of Washington
- Thesis: Regression Analysis of Correlated Binary Data (1989)
- Doctoral advisor: Norman Breslow

Academic work
- Institutions: University of Otago
- Doctoral students: Ayesha Verrall

Katrina Jane Sharples is a New Zealand biostatistician. She is a full professor in the Department of Mathematics and Statistics at the University of Otago, and head of statistics at Otago.

Sharples completed a Ph.D. in statistics at the University of Washington in 1989. Her dissertation, Regression Analysis of Correlated Binary Data, was supervised by Norman Breslow.

Her research has included work on cattle-based spreading of leptospirosis in Tanzania, and a study of tuberculosis in Indonesia.

Sharples is also a viola player in the Dunedin Symphony Orchestra, and has performed in smaller string ensembles in Dunedin.
