= Fletcher Tabuteau =

New Zealand politician

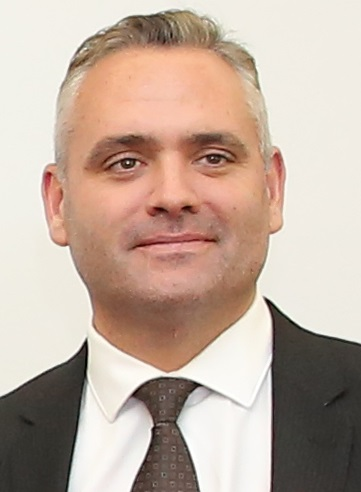
- Tabuteau in 2015

Parliamentary Under-Secretary for Foreign Affairs
- In office 26 October 2017 – 6 November 2020
- Prime Minister: Jacinda Ardern
- Minister: Winston Peters

Parliamentary Under-Secretary for Regional Economic Development
- In office 26 October 2017 – 6 November 2020
- Prime Minister: Jacinda Ardern
- Minister: Shane Jones

Parliamentary Under-Secretary for Disarmament and Arms Control
- In office 2 May 2018 – 6 November 2020
- Prime Minister: Jacinda Ardern
- Minister: Winston Peters

Member of the New Zealand Parliament for New Zealand First list
- In office 20 September 2014 – 17 October 2020

5th Deputy Leader of New Zealand First
- In office 27 February 2018 – 2020
- Leader: Winston Peters
- Preceded by: Ron Mark
- Succeeded by: Shane Jones

Personal details
- Born: Fletcher Hoporona Tabuteau; 1974 (age 51–52) Rotorua, New Zealand
- Spouse: Karen
- Children: 2
- Education: University of Waikato

Fletcher Hoporona Tabuteau (born 1974) is a New Zealand politician and former Member of Parliament. He was elected as a list MP for the New Zealand First party from 2014 to 2020 and was deputy leader of the party from 2018 to 2020.

== Early life and family ==
Tabuteau was born in 1974 to parents David Vaughan Tabuteau, a draper, and Maria Titaha Gear. Born and raised in Rotorua, Tabuteau is of Māori descent through his mother, affiliating to the Ngāti Ngāraranui, Ngāti Rangiwewehi, and Ngāti Whakaue iwi. Tabuteau is of French–Huguenot descent on his father's side of the family, although he was raised as a Roman Catholic. His younger sister, Stacey, died when she was 30 from a congenital heart defect.

Tabuteau is married to Karen, with whom he shares two children.

His whānau include senior New Zealand First party official Tommy Gear (who was Tabuteau's uncle) and New Zealand Police deputy commissioner Wally Haumaha.

== Education and career ==
Tabuteau attended Rotorua Boys' High School before completing tertiary study in business and teaching at Waiariki Institute of Technology and the University of Waikato. He taught mathematics and social studies at Rotorua Boys' for eight years and was also the careers adviser and senior dean.

He was an economics lecturer and head of the business school at Waiariki Institute of Technology from 2011 until his election to Parliament at the 2014 election.

== Member of Parliament ==
New Zealand Parliament
Years	Term	Electorate	List	Party
2014–2017	51st	List	4	NZ First
2017–2020	52nd	List	4	NZ First

Tabuteau is a long-standing member and supporter of New Zealand First. He joined the party as a teenager after his parents drove him from Rotorua to Auckland to attend the party's launch event in 1993. He has held various positions on the party's Rotorua branch committee including treasurer and chairman.

He stood unsuccessfully for the party in the Rotorua electorate during the 2002, 2005 and 2011. His party list rankings for those elections were 18, 17 and 11 respectively, and he failed to be elected as a list MP on any of those occasions.

Tabuteau was first elected into the New Zealand House of Representatives on the New Zealand First list during the 2014 general election. Ranked 4 on the party list, this was the highest position given to any non-incumbent. He was re-elected on the New Zealand First list during the 2017 general election.

=== First term, 2014–2017 ===
In Tabuteau's first term, New Zealand First was part of the opposition. He was the party's spokesperson on commerce, energy, revenue, tourism and trade and was a member of the foreign affairs, defence and trade committee. His member's bill, the Fighting Foreign Corporate Control Bill, was selected for first reading in March 2015. The bill was designed to limit New Zealand's ability to sign the Trans-Pacific Partnership trade agreement but failed its first reading when it was not supported by government parties. The main content of the bill became government policy after the change of government in 2017.

=== Coalition Government, 2017–2020 ===
Following the formation of a coalition government consisting of Labour, New Zealand First, and the Greens, Tabuteau was appointed as the Parliamentary Under-Secretary to the Minister of Foreign Affairs Winston Peters and the Minister for Regional Economic Development Shane Jones. He later gained further appointment as Parliamentary Under-Secretary to the Minister of Disarmament and Arms Control when that ministerial position was re-created (and assigned to Peters) in May 2018. As the coalition government had no associate ministers in the foreign affairs portfolio, Tabuteau's role included deputising for Peters as required. He also had delegated responsibility for the New Zealand Agency for International Development programme and supporting the delivery of regional economic action plans.

In addition to his roles in the executive government, Tabuteau was additionally his party's spokesperson for commerce, energy, insurance, revenue, superannuation and tourism and associate spokesperson for finance; the deputy chair of parliament's finance and expenditure committee; and, during the initial COVID-19 pandemic in New Zealand, a member of the epidemic response committee.

A second member's bill in Tabuteau's name, the KiwiFund Bill, was introduced in December 2017 and passed its first reading in February 2018. The Bill would have established an independent working group with the objective to set up a government-owned and operated KiwiSaver provider. However, it was withdrawn in August 2018 after the economic development, science and innovation committee recommended that the bill not be passed.

He succeeded Ron Mark as deputy leader of New Zealand First on 27 February 2018. He resigned that position in 2020 after the party's defeat in the 2020 New Zealand general election. Tabuteau unsuccessfully contested the Rotorua electorate for the sixth time, coming in fourth place. He and his fellow New Zealand First MPs lost their seats after the party's vote dropped to 2.6%, below the five percent threshold needed to enter Parliament.

Tabuteau has remained associated with New Zealand First, such as attending its 2022 party convention, co-emceeing the party's 30th birthday event in 2023, and training new NZ First MPs who will enter Parliament in 2023.

== Post-parliamentary career ==
In March 2021, Tabuteau began working for Rotorua District Council in a part-time economic development role. In July 2021, Tabuteau announced that he would be a candidate for the Rotorua mayoralty at the 2022 local elections, following the incumbent Steve Chadwick's decision not to stand again. He continued in his council role until January 2022. At the October 2022 elections, he gained the second-highest number of votes after Tania Tapsell.

In November 2023, Tabuteau joined lobbying company Capital as a director. The October 2023 general election put New Zealand First in a position to become part of the government, and Tabuteau said that his history with New Zealand First was significant to his hiring. In 2024, the government appointed Tabuteau as chair of the New Zealand Māori Arts and Crafts Institute Board.

Political offices
New office	Parliamentary Under-Secretary to the Minister of Foreign Affairs; 2017–2020	Office abolished
New office	Parliamentary Under-Secretary to the Minister for Regional Economic Development; 2017–2020	Office abolished
New office	Parliamentary Under-Secretary to the Minister for Disarmament and Arms Control; 2018–2020	Office abolished
Party political offices
Preceded by Ron Mark	Deputy leader of New Zealand First; 2018–2020	Succeeded by
