= Ron Mark =

New Zealand politician

The Honourable Ron Mark
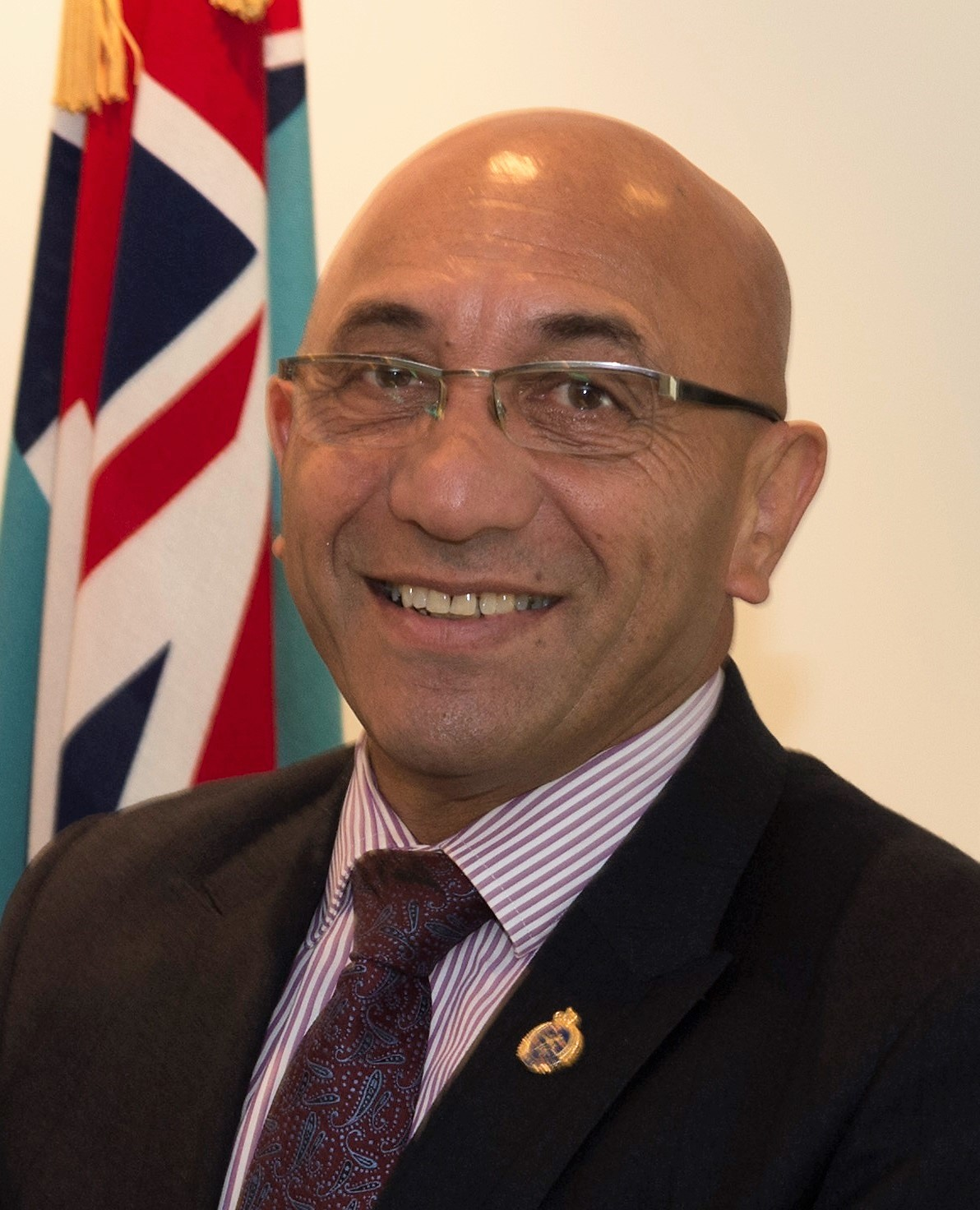

40th Minister of Defence
- In office 26 October 2017 – 6 November 2020
- Prime Minister: Jacinda Ardern
- Preceded by: Mark Mitchell
- Succeeded by: Peeni Henare

Member of the New Zealand Parliament for New Zealand First list
- In office 20 September 2014 – 17 October 2020
- In office 12 October 1996 – 8 November 2008

Mayor of Carterton District
- In office 8 October 2022 – 29 October 2025
- Preceded by: Greg Lang
- Succeeded by: Steve Cretney
- In office 9 October 2010 – September 2014
- Preceded by: Gary McPhee
- Succeeded by: John Booth

4th Deputy Leader of New Zealand First
- In office 3 July 2015 – 27 February 2018
- Leader: Winston Peters
- Preceded by: Tracey Martin
- Succeeded by: Fletcher Tabuteau

Personal details
- Born: 29 January 1954 (age 72) Masterton, New Zealand
- Party: Labour (1990–1993); New Zealand First (1996–present)
- Spouses: Gail Mark (separated); Christine Tracey (current)
- Children: 5
- Occupation: Business owner/operator

Military service
- Allegiance: New Zealand; Oman
- Branch/service: New Zealand Army; Sultan's Special Forces
- Years of service: 1971–1986; 1985–1990
- Rank: Captain
- Unit: Multinational Force and Observers
- Awards: New Zealand Operational Service Medal; New Zealand General Service Medal (Sinai); New Zealand Defence Service Medal; Multinational Service Medal and Bar; Order of the Special Royal Emblem for expatriate officers The Oman Peace Medal; The Glorious Fifteenth National Day Medal

Ron Stanley Mark (born 29 January 1954) is a New Zealand politician of the New Zealand First party, and former soldier, who served as Minister of Defence between October 2017 and November 2020. He served as mayor of Carterton from 2010 to 2014, and again between 2022 and 2025.

== Early life and family ==
Mark was born in Masterton on 29 January 1954, the son of Apiti Stanley Maaka and Te Aroha Maaka (née Grace). He was fostered with six Pākehā foster families in Pahiatua, saying "I wouldn’t have survived without them". He was educated at Tararua College from 1968 to 1970. Mark's first wife was Gail (née Berry) Mark, and the couple had four children. On 12 February 2012, Mark told The New Zealand Herald that his partner of seven years, Christine Tracey, had made a leap year proposal. Marama Fox, formerly a Māori Party MP, is a cousin of Mark.

== Military and professional careers ==
Mark pursued a military career between 1971 and 1990, initially serving in the New Zealand Army. His first unit was the Royal New Zealand Electrical and Mechanical Engineers before moving to 2/1 Battalion, 3 and 10 Tpt Regiments and Queen Alexandra's Mounted Rifles before passing New Zealand Special Air Service selection. Mark served a 13-month tour of duty in the Sinai with the Multinational Force and Observers in 1982–83. After being refused entry into the NZSAS, he was contracted to the Sultanate of Oman as a technical staff officer from 1985 to 1986, and then joined the Sultan of Oman's Armed Forces becoming an electrical and mechanical engineering officer in the Sultan's Special Force Electrical and Mechanical Engineers between 1986 and 1990.

Between 1990 and 1996, Mark was a commercial consultant, ran an import and export business, and was an amusement park operator.

== Member of Parliament, 1996–2008 ==
New Zealand Parliament
Years	Term	Electorate	List	Party
1996–1999	45th	List	11	NZ First
1999–2002	46th	List	4	NZ First
2002–2005	47th	List	4	NZ First
2005–2008	48th	List	4	NZ First
2014–2017	51st	List	9	NZ First
2017–2020	52nd	List	2	NZ First

In the 1993 election he was the Labour candidate for the Selwyn electorate. He was later involved in the discussions about the formation of the New Zealand Democratic Coalition. When these failed, he joined New Zealand First. He was a list MP from the 1996 election until his party's failure to retain any seats in the 2008 election. During the (1996–98) coalition between New Zealand First and the National Party, he was the government's Senior Whip.

The New Zealand television channel TV3 was banned for three days from filming in Parliament in August 2006 for showing Mark repeatedly giving the finger to another MP.

In 2009, Mark told media that while he still had a subscription with New Zealand First, he was "not active", and that he would not rule out standing for Parliament with another party.

== Mayor of Carterton, 2010–2014 ==
In 2010, Mark was elected Mayor of Carterton in the Wairarapa. He succeeded outspoken mayor Gary McPhee who retired after two terms. In the 2013 local elections, Mark was returned as mayor unopposed.

== Return to Parliament, 2014–2020 ==
=== Fourth term, 2014–2017 ===
Mark stood as a New Zealand First candidate at the 2014 general election, finishing third in the Wairarapa electorate. However, his ninth placing on the New Zealand First list saw him returned to Parliament, and he resigned as Mayor of Carterton, and was replaced by John Booth.

When the new Parliament was sworn in on 20 October 2014, Mark was one of two MPs nominated for the position of Speaker of the House of Representatives. He received 13 votes, coming second to incumbent Speaker David Carter.

In Parliament, Mark was noted for being critical of attacks on private military contractors like himself, and critical of what he considered terrorist organizations like the African National Congress and those who fought against the government of Southern Rhodesia.

On 3 July 2015, he replaced Tracey Martin as deputy leader of New Zealand First.

In November 2015, Mark told National MP Melissa Lee to go back to Korea in parliament.

=== Fifth term, 2017–2020 ===
During the 2017 election, Mark contested Wairarapa, finishing third place. However, he was re-elected into Parliament on New Zealand First's party list.

Following the 2017 general election, Mark was appointed Minister of Defence and Veterans following the formation of a coalition government consisting of the Labour Party, New Zealand First, and the Green Party. Mark was succeeded as New Zealand First deputy leader by Fletcher Tabuteau on 27 February 2018.

During the 2020 general election held on 17 October, Mark contested the Wairarapa electorate, coming third place behind Labour's candidate Kieran McAnulty and National's candidate Mike Butterick. He and his fellow NZ First MPs lost their seats after the party's vote dropped to 2.6%, below the five percent threshold needed to enter Parliament.

On 9 November 2020, Mark was granted retention of the title "The Honourable" for life, in recognition of his term as a member of the Executive Council.

== 2020–present ==
Mark and other former New Zealand First MPs were approached by the media ahead of the party's AGM in June 2021. He said that he would not be attending the meeting or renewing his party membership, as he was finished with politics and not interested in returning to Parliament. Mark travelled to Ukraine to assist with humanitarian efforts during the 2022 Russian invasion of Ukraine.

=== Mayor of Carterton, 2022–2025 ===
Mark was re-elected as Mayor of Carterton in the 2022 New Zealand local elections. He ran on a campaign for more scrutiny of council operations to avoid previous "cost blowouts", also drawing attention to what he described as "some political parties...pushing for central control over everything, whether by asset stripping first or imposing more and more legislative requirements". He later clarified his concerns that this was [an]..."ideological drive to centralise and put everything under the control of the government", citing the Three Waters reform programme as an example of this "collectivism". Mark also expressed some concerns about the voting process due to high numbers of people not receiving their voting papers, or votes going missing in the mail, stating that "constitutionally...[this]...is open to questioning by every court of law."

In August 2023, Mark expressed concern that a government review recommending that New Zealand's 67 city and district councils and 11 regional councils be reorganised into 15 regional groupings could "to a more centralised socialist viewpoint, disempowering our people." While serving as Mayor of Carterton between 2010 and 2014, Mark had supported the amalgamation of local government bodies. In April 2021, the Minister of Local Government Nanaia Mahuta had commissioned a review into the future of local government in New Zealand. A draft report was released on 28 October 2022 while the final report was released in July 2023.

In early July 2024, Mayor Mark urged other local councils to consider amalgamating into larger entities due to the financial costs of the Sixth National Government's "Local Water Done Well" programme, stating "there was no room for fiefdoms doing their own thing in the future." Mayor of South Wairarapa Martin Connelly expressed disagreement with Mark, saying that "it is far too early to know what the long-term effects will be."

Mark chose not to contest the 2025 Carterton mayoral election and was succeeded by Steve Cretney as Mayor of Carterton.

=== Waitangi Tribunal ===
In mid January 2025, Mark was appointed to the Waitangi Tribunal by Minister for Māori Development Tama Potaka.

=== 2026 general election ===
In early August 2026, New Zealand First confirmed that Mark would be standing as one of their candidates for the 2026 New Zealand general election. He contested the Wairarapa electorate and was ranked 16th place on the party list.

In late October 2026, Mark drew media attention and controversy after posting a social media campaign video suggesting that the woke "woke b******t of diversity, equity and inclusiveness" contributed to the 2024 sinking of HMNZS Manawanui, which was captained by Commander Yvonne Gray. In response to criticism, Mark denied that his campaign advertisement was misogynistic, saying that:

I have had the privilege to serve alongside of some outstanding officers - who were also females - who performed with absolute distinction, and I had the privilege of appointing certain a certain woman upon request of a Foreign Nation to a job that no man has ever done, and it was a high-level intelligence job.

Mark also said that NZ First's defence policy and six-year defence plan had clauses protecting "female-specific roles" including intelligence gathering. In response, Prime Minister Christopher Luxon defended the New Zealand Defence Force's personnel and suggested that Mark was trying to cosplay the controversial United States Secretary of Defense Peter Hegseth. By contrast, NZ First leader Winston Peters defended the content of Mark's advertisement, alleging that the Manwanui's commander Gray was hired under a "DEI" programme.

On 7 November, Mark came third place in the Wairarapa race, gaining 3,555 votes based on preliminary results. Due to his lower list ranking, he was not elected into Parliament via the NZ First party list.

Political offices
Preceded by Mark Mitchell	Minister of Defence; 2017–2020	Succeeded by Peeni Henare
Party political offices
Preceded by Tracey Martin	Deputy leader of New Zealand First; 2015–2018	Succeeded by Fletcher Tabuteau
