= OECD Working Party on SMEs and Entrepreneurship =

The Working Party on SMEs and Entrepreneursip (WPSMEE) is a Working Party of the Organisation for Economic Cooperation and Development (OECD), which offers advice to member countries on the design and implementation of small and medium-sized enterprises and entrepreneurship policies. It is a body of the Committee for Industry, Innovation and Entrepreneurship (CIIE).

== Formation ==
Initially known as the OECD Working Party on SMEs (WPSME – until 2002), the group was created in 1993 after Australian businessman and philanthropist Peter Fritz advocated the establishment of a body that focused on SMEs during meetings with OECD representatives in Australia earlier in the year.

At a meeting in the Australian Embassy in Paris, OECD representatives agreed to create the Working Group, and its draft mandate was published in March.

== Early years (1993-2000): accumulation of SME analysis ==
The group initially undertook a comprehensive analysis of SME policies and issues at both the national and international level. This led to the creation of a comprehensive analytical framework identifying best practice policies in member states which informed a series of reports, including the OECD Manual for the Evaluation of SME and Entrepreneurship Policies.

The Working Party also focused on the potential and promotion of women's entrepreneurship and published a report on this topic in 1997. A complementary international conference was also organised to assess national issues in member states and develop best practice policies.

== Bologna Process ==
The research published by the WPSMEE led to the first Ministerial Conference on SMEs in Bologna, Italy, from June 14–15, 2000. The conference, entitled “Enhancing the competitiveness of SME’s in the Global Economy: Strategies and Policies”, focused on innovation, Ecommerce, and SME exporterss in developing countries. Forty-nine countries participated and SME and Industry ministerial representatives adopted the Bologna Charter on SME policies.

‘The Bologna Process’. gained momentum with the second Ministerial Conference, held in Istanbul in June 2004. This conference saw 72 countries participate, with Ministers committing to the ‘Istanbul Ministerial Declaration on Fostering the Growth of Innovative and Internationally Competitive SMEs’. The Ministerial Conference in Istanbul led to the development of an evaluation framework of SME programmes and policies, the improvement of SME data and statistics with an emphasis on female entrepreneurship, and additional work on SME globalisation.

Since the second Ministerial Conference, the Working Party has organised further high-level events under the auspices of the Bologna Process. These include:

- The OECD Global Conference on ‘Better Financing for entrepreneurship and SME growth’ (2006, Brasilia)
- The OECD Global Conference on ‘Enhancing the role of SMEs in Global Value Chains’ (2007, Tokyo)
- ‘Bologna +10 high-level meeting on SMEs and entrepreneurship’ (2010, Paris)

== Recent and ongoing initiatives ==
Since the Bologna +10 meeting, the Working Party has published numerous reports, comparative notes and policy briefs:

- Financing SMEs and Entrepreneurs – an OECD Scoreboard

Now in its ninth edition, the Financing Scoreboard provides data from 48 countries on SME lending, financing conditions and policy initiatives.

- OECD SME and Entrepreneurship Outlook

The report presents the latest trends in the performance of SMEs and entrepreneurs, and it provides a comprehensive overview of the business conditions and policy frameworks that can enable them to thrive in a digitalised and globalized world.

- OECD Strategy for SMEs

In 2019, the WPSMEE develop a new project to assist economies in developing effective SME policy, reporting on global megatrends, economic and institutional contexts and financial measures.

- OECD Policy Note on Responses towards SMEs in the context of COVID-19

During the COVID-19 pandemic, the WPSMEE prepared periodically updated notes on the economic outlook for SMEs and analysis of emergency support measures and SME policy approaches in OECD member nations.

== Level 1 Committee on SMEs and Entrepreneurship ==
On 27 April 2021 the OECD Council, the Organisation's governing body, took the decision to elevate the Working Party on SMEs and Entrepreneurship to a full Committee reporting directly to Ambassadors, thus signaling the critical role SMEs can play in driving a sustainable, inclusive, green and resilient post-COVID recovery.
