= Ayesha Verrall =

New Zealand politician, physician and infectious-diseases researcher (born 1979)

The Honourable Ayesha Verrall MP FRACP
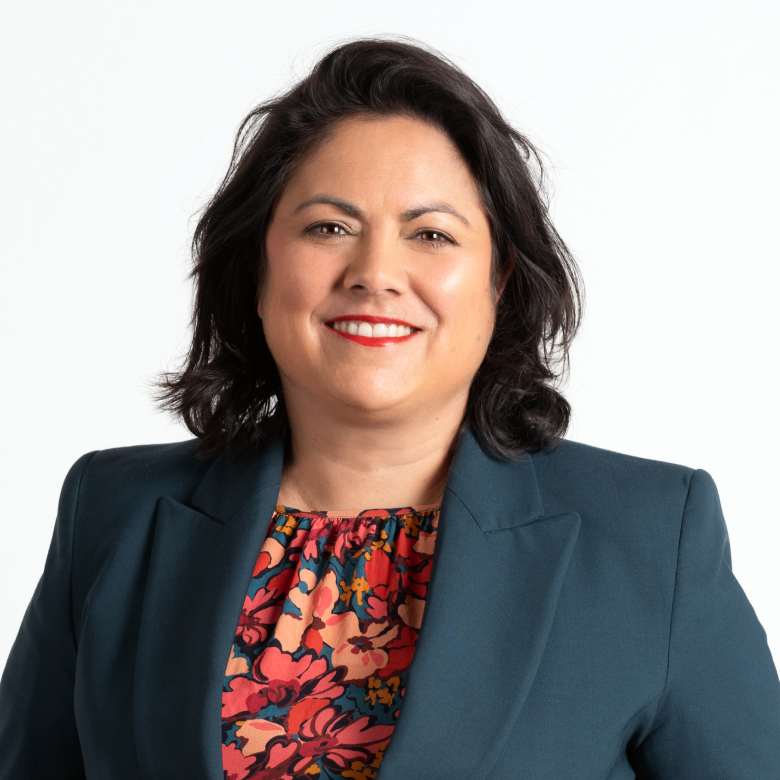
- Verrall in 2023

43rd Minister of Health
- In office 1 February 2023 – 27 November 2023
- Prime Minister: Chris Hipkins
- Preceded by: Andrew Little
- Succeeded by: Shane Reti

2nd Minister for COVID-19 Response
- In office 14 June 2022 – 1 February 2023
- Prime Minister: Jacinda Ardern; Chris Hipkins
- Preceded by: Chris Hipkins
- Succeeded by: Position abolished

27th Minister for Research, Science and Innovation
- In office 14 June 2022 – 27 November 2023
- Prime Minister: Jacinda Ardern; Chris Hipkins
- Preceded by: Megan Woods
- Succeeded by: Judith Collins

14th Minister for Seniors
- In office 6 November 2020 – 1 February 2023
- Prime Minister: Jacinda Ardern; Chris Hipkins
- Preceded by: Tracey Martin
- Succeeded by: Ginny Andersen

8th Minister for Food Safety
- In office 6 November 2020 – 14 June 2022
- Prime Minister: Jacinda Ardern
- Preceded by: Damien O'Connor
- Succeeded by: Meka Whaitiri

Member of the New Zealand Parliament for Labour party list
- Incumbent
- Assumed office 17 October 2020

Personal details
- Born: Ayesha Jennifer Verrall; 1979 (age 46–47) Invercargill, New Zealand
- Party: Labour
- Spouse: Alice
- Children: 1
- Relatives: Mohamed Nasheed (cousin)
- Education: University of Otago (MB ChB, PhD); London School of Hygiene & Tropical Medicine (MSc); Gorgas Institute (DipTropMedH)
- Website: University of Otago profile
- Scientific career
- Fields: Infectious diseases
- Workplaces: University of Otago, Wellington
- Thesis: Innate Factors in Early Clearance of Mycobacterium tuberculosis (2018)
- Doctoral advisors: Philip Hill; Katrina Sharples; Reinout van Crevel; Bachti Alisjahbana

Ayesha Jennifer Verrall (/ˈaɪʃə/ EYE-shə; born 1979) is a New Zealand politician, infectious-diseases physician and researcher with expertise in tuberculosis and international health. Since 2020, she has been a Member of the New Zealand House of Representatives for the Labour Party.

Verrall was previously a senior lecturer in pathology and molecular medicine at the University of Otago. She came to public attention during the COVID-19 pandemic when, after criticising the Government's pandemic response, she was commissioned to audit the contact tracing system. Soon after, she was elected to Parliament and appointed to the Cabinet. She served as Minister for Food Safety, Minister for Research, Science and Innovation, Minister for Seniors, and Minister of Health in the Sixth Labour Government.

== Early life and education ==
Verrall was born in Invercargill to Lathee and Bill Verrall. She was raised in Te Anau. Her mother was born in the Maldives and was the first Maldivian to pass Cambridge examinations in English and study in New Zealand on a Colombo Plan scholarship. Verrall is named after her grandmother, who died when Lathee was two years old. In 1997, she was a member of the New Zealand Youth Parliament, selected to represent Clutha-Southland MP Bill English.

After her secondary education at Fiordland College, Verrall obtained a Bachelor of Medicine, Bachelor of Surgery (MBChB) in 2004 from the University of Otago Dunedin School of Medicine. She became the president of the Otago University Students' Association in 2001. While in this role she lobbied for interest-free student loans. In 2003, Verall led the formation of the New Zealand Medical Student Journal (NZMSJ).

During the next decade, Verrall trained in tropical medicine, bioethics and international health in the United Kingdom, Singapore, and Peru. She graduated with a Master of Science from the London School of Hygiene & Tropical Medicine and a Diploma in Tropical Medicine and Hygiene from the University of Alabama through the Gorgas Institute in Lima, Peru.

In 2018, Verrall completed her PhD in tuberculosis epidemiology at the University of Otago, in collaboration with Padjadjaran University in Indonesia and Radboud University Nijmegen in the Netherlands. Her research investigated the early clearance immune response to the Mycobacterium tuberculosis infection among Indonesian people who were highly exposed to the bacteria yet remained uninfected. She developed the Innate Factors in Early Clearance of M. tuberculosis (INFECT) cohort as part of her dissertation.

== Professional career ==
Before entering national politics, Verrall was a senior lecturer at the University of Otago in the Department of Pathology and Molecular Medicine. She taught microbiology to medical students and researched tuberculosis epidemiology, immunology, and host-pathogen interactions. She was also an infectious diseases physician at the Capital and Coast District Health Board in Wellington and became an elected member of its board in the 2019 local elections. She stood representing the Labour Party and was appointed as the board's deputy chair.

During the 2019–2020 New Zealand measles outbreak, Verrall advocated for a more strategic approach to allocating government resources to increase vaccination rates for measles and prevent future outbreaks.

In March 2020, during the COVID-19 pandemic, Verrall called for the government to urgently improve its data on the community spread of COVID-19 by expanding the testing criteria beyond sick people and increasing laboratory testing and contact tracing capabilities to reach 1000 people per day. At the time, contact tracing was only carried out for 50 cases per day. Subsequently, Verrall was commissioned by the ministry to provide an independent audit of its contact tracing program. Her report was submitted in early April and made public on 20 April. It concluded that although the quality of contact tracing was good, the health sector was "understaffed and lacked cohesion," relied on slow, manual processes and hard to scale up. The ministry accepted Verrall's recommendations. In June 2020, Verrall was invited by the World Health Organization to share her audit report as an example of best practice.

== Political career ==
New Zealand Parliament
| Years | Term | Electorate | List | Party |
|---|---|---|---|---|
| 2020–2023 | 53rd | List | 17 | Labour |
| 2023–2026 | 54th | List | 7 | Labour |
| 2026–present | 55th | List | 6 | Labour |

The Labour Party announced its list candidates for the October 2020 general election on 15 June. Verrall was ranked 17th as a list-only candidate, the highest-ranked newcomer, positioned behind Cabinet ministers and the Speaker but ahead of other sitting MPs. With that winnable position, she was immediately identified as a future health minister (David Clark, who had held that office since 2017, had been recently demoted amid several scandals). Verrall said the COVID-19 pandemic was her "push" to move from academia and medicine into politics. Her election as a list MP was confirmed in November and she gave her maiden statement in Parliament on 8 December 2020.

=== Sixth Labour Government, 2020–2023 ===
Verrall was appointed as a new minister in the continuing Sixth Labour Government's Cabinet, as Minister for Seniors, Minister for Food Safety, Associate Minister of Health and Associate Minister of Research, Science and Innovation. Verrall also became Acting Minister of Conservation in April 2021 when Kiri Allan went on medical leave and Associate Minister for COVID-19 Response in February 2022.

As Associate Minister of Health, Verrall unveiled the Government's new Smokefree 2025 plan in early December 2021. As part of the plan, the Government introduced legislation banning anyone under the age of 14 from legally purchasing tobacco for the rest of their lives. Older generations would only be permitted to buy tobacco products with very low-levels of nicotine while fewer shops will be allowed to sell tobacco products. The law changes, passed in 2022, were reversed by the Sixth National Government in 2024 before they came into effect.

In a June 2022 reshuffle, Verrall was reappointed as Minister for Seniors and Associate Minister of Health and newly appointed as Minister for COVID-19 Response and Minister for Research, Science and Innovation. Another reshuffle, in February 2023, saw her promoted to be Minister of Health, retaining the research, science and innovation portfolio. In a retrospective interview in 2025, Verrall said her priorities as Minister of Health had been "workforce, wait lists and winter."

=== Opposition, 2023–present ===
During the 2023 New Zealand general election held on 14 October, Verrall was re-elected to Parliament on the Labour Party list. Labour lost the election and in late November 2023 Verrall assumed the health, public service and Wellington issues shadow portfolios in the Shadow Cabinet of Chris Hipkins.

On 5 December 2023, Verrall was granted retention of the title The Honourable, in recognition of her term as a member of the Executive Council.

As Labour's health spokesperson, Verrall was critical of the appointment of Health New Zealand commissioner Lester Levy and his financial management of the public health service.

In a shadow cabinet reshuffle in early March 2025, Verrall lost her public service portfolio but retained the health and Wellington issues portfolios.

Verrall was selected as the Labour candidate for the Wellington North electorate in a November 2025 preselection vote. She was ranked sixth on the Labour Party list. On 7 November, Verrall came second place in Wellington North with 13,658 votes, based on preliminary results. She was re-elected to Parliament on the Labour Party list.

== Awards and honours ==
Verrall is a Fellow of the Royal Australasian College of Physicians (FRACP).

The Verrall Award, granted by the New Zealand Medical Student Journal, is named after her, to honour her efforts to form and secure funding for the journal in 2003.

== Personal life ==
Verrall has one daughter with her partner Alice. Maldivian politician Mohamed Nasheed is her cousin.

== Selected works and publications ==
- Verrall, Ayesha J.; Alisjahbana, Bachti; Apriani, Lika; Novianty, Novianty; Nurani, Andini C.; van Laarhoven, Arjan; Ussher, James E.; Indrati, Agnes; Ruslami, Rovina; Netea, Mihai G.; Sharples, Katrina (28 March 2020). "Early clearance of Mycobacterium tuberculosis: the INFECT case contact cohort study in Indonesia". The Journal of Infectious Diseases. 221 (8): 1351–1360. doi:10.1093/infdis/jiz168. ISSN 0022-1899. PMID 31298280.
- Verrall, Ayesha J; Chaidir, Lidya; Ruesen, Carolien; Apriani, Lika; Koesoemadinata, Raspati C; van Ingen, Jakko; Sharples, Katrina; van Crevel, Reinout; Alisjahbana, Bachti; Hill, Philip C; on behalf of the INFECT study group (8 January 2020). "Lower BCG protection against Mycobacterium tuberculosis infection after exposure to Beijing strains". American Journal of Respiratory and Critical Care Medicine. 201 (9): rccm.201912–2349LE. doi:10.1164/rccm.201912-2349LE. hdl:2066/220108. ISSN 1073-449X. PMID 31914319. S2CID 210122235.
- Koeken, Valerie A. C. M.; Verrall, Ayesha J.; Ardiansyah, Edwin; Apriani, Lika; dos Santos, Jéssica C.; Kumar, Vinod; Alisjahbana, Bachti; Hill, Philip C.; Joosten, Leo A. B.; van Crevel, Reinout; van Laarhoven, Arjan (2020). "IL-32 and its splice variants are associated with protection against Mycobacterium tuberculosis infection and skewing of Th1/Th17 cytokines". Journal of Leukocyte Biology. 107 (1): 113–118. doi:10.1002/JLB.4AB0219-071R. ISSN 1938-3673. PMC 6972663. PMID 31378983.
- Steigler, Pia; Verrall, Ayesha J.; Kirman, Joanna R. (2019). "Beyond memory T cells: mechanisms of protective immunity to tuberculosis infection". Immunology & Cell Biology. 97 (7): 647–655. doi:10.1111/imcb.12278. ISSN 1440-1711. PMID 31141205.

Political offices
| Preceded by Tracey Martin | Minister for Seniors; 2020–2023 | Succeeded by Ginny Andersen |
| Preceded by Damien O'Connor | Minister for Food Safety; 2020–2022 | Succeeded by Meka Whaitiri |
| Preceded by Chris Hipkins | Minister for COVID-19 Response; 2022–2023 | Position abolished |
| Preceded by Megan Woods | Minister for Research, Science and Innovation; 2022–2023 | Succeeded by Judith Collins |
| Preceded by Andrew Little | Minister of Health; 2023 | Succeeded by Shane Reti |
