= Tracey Martin =

New Zealand politician (born 1964)

The Honourable Tracey Martin
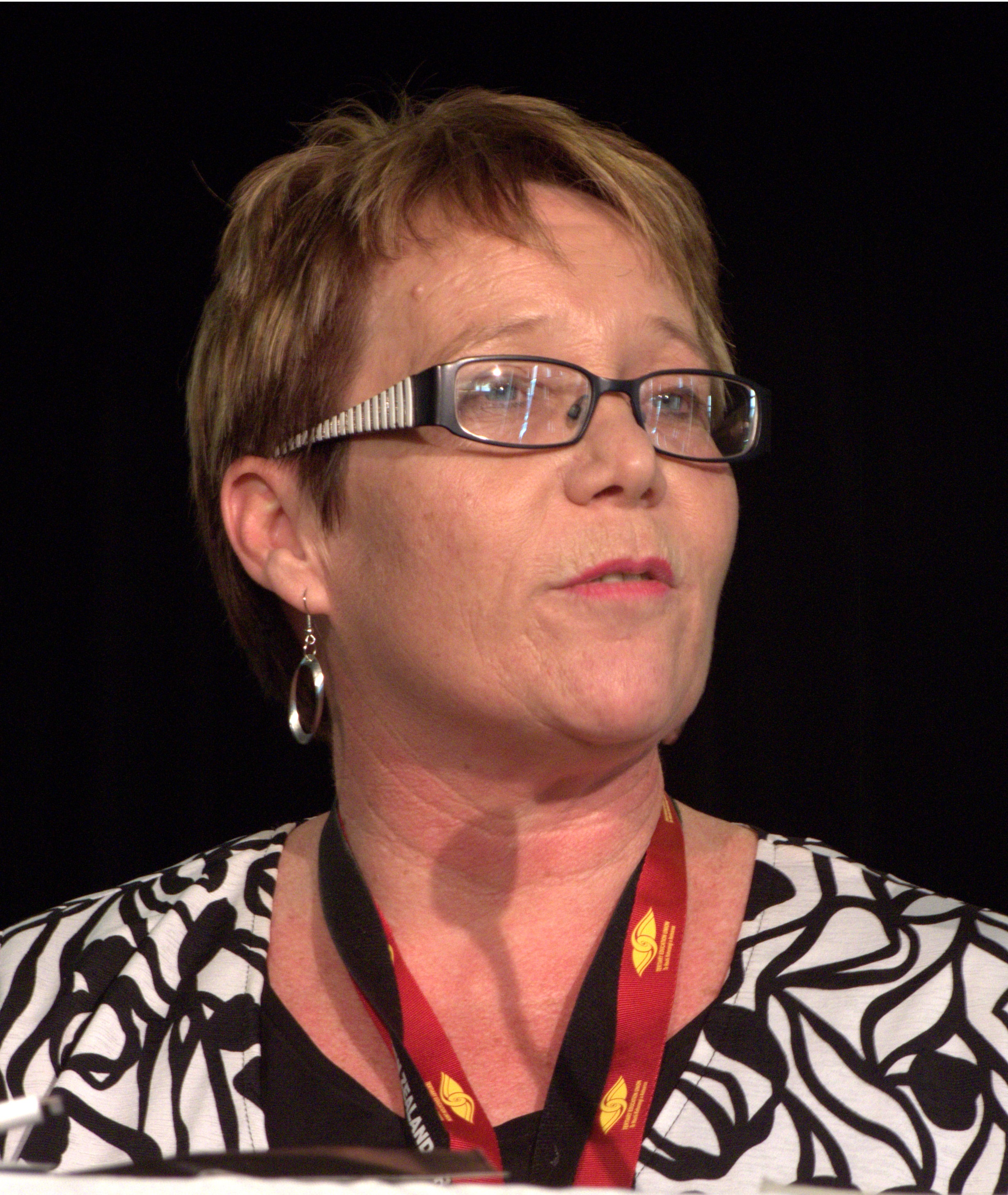
- Martin in 2014

35th Minister of Internal Affairs
- In office 26 October 2017 – 6 November 2020
- Prime Minister: Jacinda Ardern
- Preceded by: Peter Dunne
- Succeeded by: Jan Tinetti

2nd Minister for Children
- In office 26 October 2017 – 6 November 2020
- Prime Minister: Jacinda Ardern
- Preceded by: Anne Tolley
- Succeeded by: Kelvin Davis

13th Minister for Seniors
- In office 26 October 2017 – 6 November 2020
- Prime Minister: Jacinda Ardern
- Preceded by: Maggie Barry
- Succeeded by: Ayesha Verrall

3rd Deputy Leader of New Zealand First
- In office 23 October 2013 – 3 July 2015
- Leader: Winston Peters
- Preceded by: Peter Brown
- Succeeded by: Ron Mark

Member of the New Zealand Parliament for New Zealand First party list
- In office 26 November 2011 – 17 October 2020

Personal details
- Born: Tracey Anne Martin; 1 July 1964 (age 62) Levin, New Zealand
- Party: New Zealand First (1993–2021)
- Spouse: Ben
- Children: 3

Tracey Anne Martin (born 1 July 1964) is a New Zealand former politician. She was a member of the New Zealand House of Representatives between 2011 and 2020, representing the New Zealand First Party.

Martin was deputy leader of New Zealand First from 2013 to 2015. She served as Minister for Children, Minister for Seniors, Minister of Internal Affairs and Associate Minister of Education from 2017 to 2020.

== Early life and career ==
Tracey Martin was born in Levin on 1 July 1964. Her mother, Anne Martin (née Williams) was a primary school teacher and political activist with the Social Credit Party and New Zealand First, including as secretary and president of New Zealand First. Martin has described her mother as the New Zealander that she most admires as a brave woman who has not been afraid to stand up for her belief and opinions. Her father was Burnett Martin. Martin has Māori ancestry through her maternal grandfather, with ties to Ngāti Kahungunu.

Martin married Ben Dugdale, a winemaker, with whom she has three children. Before starting her family, she worked as a debt collector. For 15 years, Martin was a stay-at-home parent and was active in the Warkworth community. She was involved in parent-based fundraising and volunteer committees for Mahurangi Kindergarten, Warkworth Primary School and Mahurangi College. She served as the chair of the board of trustees at Mahurangi College for over a decade, before resigning when she became the Associate Minister for Education in 2018.

== Political career ==
=== Early years ===
Martin has been involved with New Zealand First since the party started in 1993, and became a member of its board of directors in 2008. She was selected as a candidate for the 2008 general election, running unsuccessfully in Rodney and ranked 13th on the party list. She said she decided to get involved with politics due to her dissatisfaction with then-local MP, Lockwood Smith.

She successfully stood for the Rodney Local Board during the 2010 Auckland Council elections. Martin continued on the local board until 2013.

New Zealand Parliament
Years	Term	Electorate	List	Party
2011–2014	50th	List	2	NZ First
2014–2017	51st	List	2	NZ First
2017–2020	52nd	List	3	NZ First

=== Opposition, 2011–2017 ===
Martin contested the Rodney electorate for a second time in the 2011 general election, where she was defeated by newcomer Mark Mitchell. She had been ranked second on the New Zealand First party list, and was elected when the party secured 6.59% of the vote. In 2013, she was elected the deputy leader of New Zealand First. After being re-elected to Parliament in 2014, Martin lost the deputy leadership to Ron Mark in 2015.

In her first and second term, Martin was the party's spokesperson for education, broadcasting, and women's affairs. She was critical of the National government's introduction of charter schools and changes to teacher training.

In 2012, Martin sponsored the Social Security (Clothing Allowances for Orphans and Unsupported Children) Amendment Bill. The bill gave unsupported child or orphan clothing allowance parity with foster children and passed unanimously into law in 2015. Martin advocated for the expansion of this allowance so that it can be accessed by kin carers.

=== Minister in Sixth Labour Government, 2017–2020 ===
During the 2017 election, Martin was re-elected on the New Zealand First party list. The party won 7.2 percent of the vote and nine seats. Following the formation of a coalition government led by the Labour Party with New Zealand First and the Greens, Martin was appointed as Minister for Children, Minister of Internal Affairs, Minister for Seniors, and Associate Minister of Education.

Within the coalition, Martin was seen by Labour MPs as a favourite to work with, and was often asked to act as a go-between for other MPs who were having trouble reaching resolutions. Martin also ensured appropriate people were involved in coalition management, including policy adviser and Martin's sister Kirsty Christison. In an interview after the coalition, Martin said, "We realised early in that we needed to get the conversations between NZ First, Labour and the Greens really tight. It had to be people who knew the party's stand and policies and could speak with confidence about what the party was likely to accept and not accept, but were very apolitical. For NZ First, that person ended up being Kirsty."

Following an attempted "uplifting" by Oranga Tamariki social workers of a child in Hastings in June 2019, Martin (as Minister for Children) met with local iwi Ngāti Kahungunu and the Māori Council. She also announced that the Government would be conducting a review into the Hawkes Bay attempted uplifting incident. In early August 2019, Martin announced that the Government would be scrapping its Children's Teams task forces in response to the uplifting controversy but rejected comparisons with the Australian "Stolen Generations".

According to media reports, Martin participated in several months of negotiations with the Labour Party over the Government's proposed Abortion Legislation Bill, which seeks to remove abortion from the Crimes Act 1961. Despite initially ruling out a referendum, NZ First leader Winston Peters surprised both Martin and Labour by demanding a binding referendum on abortion reform in return for supporting the legislation through Parliament. Peters' actions were criticised by both the Minister of Justice Andrew Little, who initiated the legislation, opposition National MP Amy Adams, and left-wing blogger Martyn Bradbury. Martin voted in favour of the Government's abortion legislation bill, which passed its first reading on 8 August 2019.

On 14 March 2020, it was reported that Martin was one of the first New Zealand MPs to be self-isolating and tested for the COVID-19 virus after meeting with Australian Home Affairs Minister Peter Dutton, who had tested positive for the COVID-19 virus, during a Five Eyes ministerial meeting in Washington, D.C. the previous week.

During the 2020 New Zealand general election held on 17 October, Martin contested Ōhāriu, coming fifth place. She and her fellow NZ First MPs lost their seats after the party's vote dropped to 2.6%, below the five percent threshold needed to enter Parliament.

On 9 November 2020, Martin was granted retention of the title "The Honourable" for life, in recognition of her term as a member of the Executive Council.

== Post-parliamentary life ==
In late January 2021, Martin along with fellow former MP Jenny Marcroft left New Zealand First, stating that the party needed to return to its roots and rebuild. In a 2022 interview Martin revealed she felt relief at New Zealand First's failure to be re-elected as she was contemplating leaving the party due to increasing policy differences. She stated that she was now far closer to Labour politically than the majority of the New Zealand First caucus. She described Labour as having moved "to where [her] belief structure was", rather than a realignment of her own values.

Martin was appointed to a number of governance roles by the Labour Government, including as the chair of the New Zealand Qualifications Authority and a board member for the NZ Transport Agency. She was chair of the Strong Public Media business case governance group and Public Media Entity establishment board. In 2021, she was appointed a residents' representative on the governing group of the Retirement Villages Association. In 2023, Martin finished a two-year term as independent chair of the Wellington Regional Leadership Committee.

In mid April 2025, New Zealand First leader Winston Peters criticised Martin during an interview with Radio New Zealand, accusing her of advancing the Births, Deaths, Marriages, and Relationships Registration Act 2021 behind his back. In response, Martin accused Peters of circulating disinformation, stating: "Before you decide to insult people and question their honesty and integrity, you might want to get the facts."

== Political and social views ==
Along with all other New Zealand First MPs, Martin voted against the Marriage (Definition of Marriage) Amendment Bill, which legalised same-sex marriage in New Zealand, in 2013. New Zealand First requested that the bill become a referendum issue however the request was denied. Five years later, Martin said she maintained the view that a referendum should have been required.

Martin took a pro-choice stance on abortion, supporting efforts to remove it from the Crimes Act 1961. Martin's views on abortion were affected by the death of her grandmother Beverley Williams during a backstreet abortion. In October 2020, The Spinoff online magazine described her as a liberal feminist and potential successor to Winston Peters who could broaden the party's appeal to women.

Political offices
Preceded by Peter Dunne	Minister of Internal Affairs; 2017–2020	Succeeded by Jan Tinetti
Preceded by Maggie Barry	Minister for Seniors; 2017–2020	Succeeded by Ayesha Verrall
Preceded by Anne Tolley	Minister for Children; 2017–2020	Succeeded by Kelvin Davis
Party political offices
Preceded by Peter Brown	Deputy leader of New Zealand First; 2013–2015	Succeeded by Ron Mark
