= Finance and Expenditure Committee =

Select committee of the New Zealand Parliament

The Finance and Expenditure Committee (known as the Public Accounts Committee until 1962, and as the Public Expenditure Committee, from 1962) is a select committee of the House of Representatives, the unicameral chamber of the New Zealand Parliament, responsible for matters relating to the audit of the financial statements of the Government and departments, Government finance, revenue, and taxation. The committee is currently established by Standing Order 189.

== History ==
Following a reform of the former Public Accounts Committee in 1962, the Public Expenditure Committee was established and became the most influential parliamentary committee in New Zealand, establishing "a strong reputation for itself, principally because it enjoyed powers of investigation not granted to other committees and because it attracted able and ambitious members. It was the only committee able to set up its own inquiries (without reference from the House), had subcommittees chaired by opposition members, and enjoyed the support of staff from the Legislative department (now the Office of the Clerk) as well as the Audit Office."

== Jurisdiction ==
This committee looks at business related to economic and fiscal policy, taxation, revenue, banking and finance, superannuation, insurance, Government expenditure and financial performance, and public audit.

=== Ministers answerable ===
The wide scope of the committee's oversight means a number of government ministers are answerable to the committee. The table below lists them, and their position:

Minister	Portfolio
Hon. Nicola Willis	Minister of Finance
Hon. Simon Watts	Minister of Revenue
Hon. Louise Upston	Minister of Social Development and Employment
Hon. Casey Costello	Minister for Seniors

== Membership ==
=== 54th Parliament ===
The following table lists the membership of the committee during the 54th Parliament:

New Zealand House Finance and Expenditure Committee
Majority: Government (6/5)
Party	Member	Electorate	Tenure
National	Nancy Lu	List (30)	20 December 2023 – Present
National	Cameron Brewer (Chairperson)	Upper Harbour	29 January 2025 – Present
National	Ryan Hamilton (Deputy chairperson)	Hamilton East	22 May 2024 – Present
National	Dan Bidois	Northcote	29 January 2025 – Present
ACT	Todd Stephenson	List (4)	13 December 2023 – Present
NZ First	Jamie Arbuckle	List (6)	13 December 2023 – Present
Labour	Barbara Edmonds	Mana	13 December 2023 – Present
Labour	Deborah Russell	List (22)	13 December 2023 – Present
Labour	Megan Woods	Wigram	27 March 2024 – Present
Green	Chlöe Swarbrick	Auckland Central	13 December 2023 – Present
Te Pāti Māori	Rawiri Waititi	Waiariki	13 December 2023 – Present
Previous members
National	Stuart Smith	Kaikōura	13 December 2023 – 29 January 2025
National	Catherine Wedd	Tukituki	13 December 2023 – 29 January 2025
National	David MacLeod	New Plymouth	13 December 2023 – 22 May 2024
Labour	Camilla Belich	List (26)	Unknown date – 27 March 2024
National	Scott Simpson	Coromandel	13 December 2023 – 20 December 2023

=== 53rd Parliament ===
The following table lists the membership of the committee at the conclusion of the 53rd Parliament:

New Zealand House Finance and Expenditure Committee
Majority: Government (7/4)
Party	Member	Electorate
Labour	David Clark (Deputy chairperson)	Dunedin
Labour	Ingrid Leary (Chairperson)	Taieri
Labour	Anna Lorck	Tukituki
Labour	Dan Rosewarne	List (56)
Labour	Phil Twyford	Te Atatū
Labour	Helen White	List (48)
Green	Chlöe Swarbrick	Auckland Central
National	Andrew Bayly	Port Waikato
National	Simon Watts	North Shore
National	Nicola Willis	List (13)
ACT	Damien Smith	List (10)

=== 52nd Parliament ===
The following table lists the membership of the committee during the 52nd Parliament:

New Zealand House Finance and Expenditure Committee
Majority: Government (7/6)
Party	Member	Electorate
Labour	Kiri Allan	List (21)
Labour	Tāmati Coffey	Waiariki
Labour	Greg O'Connor	Ōhāriu
Labour	Deborah Russell (Chairperson)	New Lynn
Labour	Jamie Strange	List (36)
Labour	Duncan Webb	Christchurch Central
NZ First	Fletcher Tabuteau (Deputy chairperson)	List (4)
National	Andrew Bayly	Hunua
National	David Carter	List (3)
National	Paul Goldsmith	List (18)
National	Todd McClay	Rotorua
National	Michael Woodhouse	List (10)
ACT	David Seymour	Epsom

=== 50th Parliament ===
The following table lists the membership of the committee during the 50th Parliament:

New Zealand House Finance and Expenditure Committee
Majority: Government (6/5)
Party	Member	Electorate
National	Maggie Barry	North Shore
National	David Bennett	Hamilton East
National	Paul Goldsmith (Deputy chairperson)	List (30)
National	John Hayes	Wairarapa
National	Todd McClay (Chairperson)	Rotorua
National	Nick Smith	Nelson
Labour	David Clark	Dunedin North
Labour	Clayton Cosgrove	List (8)
Labour	David Parker	List (4)
NZ First	Winston Peters	List (1)
Green	Russel Norman	List (2)

=== 44th Parliament ===
The following table lists the membership of the committee during the 44th Parliament:

New Zealand House Finance and Expenditure Committee
Majority: Government (4/3)
Party	Member	Electorate
National	Max Bradford	Tarawera
National	Ian Revell	Birkenhead
National	Ruth Richardson (Chairperson)	Selwyn
National	Tony Ryall	Eastern Bay of Plenty
Labour	Michael Cullen	St Kilda
Labour	Peter Dunne	Ohariu
Labour	Elizabeth Tennet	Island Bay

Richardson resigned in July 1994 and was replaced by John Robertson as a member and Bradford as chairperson.

=== 43rd Parliament ===
The following table lists the membership of the committee during the 43rd Parliament:

New Zealand House Finance and Expenditure Committee
Majority: Government (4/3)
Party	Member	Electorate
National	Max Bradford	Tarawera
National	Peter Gresham	Waitotara
National	Murray McCully	East Coast Bays
National	Gail McIntosh	Lyttelton
Labour	David Caygill	St Albans
Labour	Peter Dunne	Ohariu
Labour	Elizabeth Tennet	Island Bay

=== 42nd Parliament ===
The following table lists the membership of the committee during the 42nd Parliament:

New Zealand House Finance and Expenditure Committee
Majority: Government (3/2)
Party	Member	Electorate
Labour	Clive Matthewson	Dunedin West
Labour	Jim Sutton (Chairperson)	Waitaki
Labour	Elizabeth Tennet	Island Bay
National	Doug Kidd	Marlborough
National	Ruth Richardson	Selwyn

=== 41st Parliament ===
The following table lists the membership of the committee during the 41st Parliament:

New Zealand House Finance and Expenditure Committee
Majority: Government (7/5)
Party	Member	Electorate
Labour	Jim Anderton	Sydenham
Labour	David Butcher	Hastings
Labour	Peter Dunne	Ohariu
Labour	Fred Gerbic	Onehunga
Labour	Annette King	Horowhenua
Labour	Peter Nielson (Chairperson)	Miramar
Labour	Fran Wilde	Wellington Central
National	Warren Cooper	Otago
National	Michael Cox	Manawatu
National	John Falloon	Pahiatua
National	Don McKinnon	Rodney
National	Robert Muldoon	Tāmaki

=== 40th Parliament ===
The following table lists the membership of the committee during the 40th Parliament:

New Zealand House Finance and Expenditure Committee
Majority: Government (7/5)
Party	Member	Electorate
National	John Banks	Whangarei
National	Philip Burdon	Fendalton
National	Michael Cox	Manawatu
National	Pat Hunt	Pakuranga
National	Don McKinnon	Rodney
National	Ian McLean (Chairperson)	Tarawera
National	Marilyn Waring	Waipa
Labour	David Butcher	Hastings
Labour	Ann Hercus	Lyttelton
Labour	Peter Nielson	Miramar
Labour	Stan Rodger	Dunedin North
Labour	Bob Tizard	Otahuhu

=== 39th Parliament ===
The following table lists the membership of the committee during the 39th Parliament:

New Zealand House Finance and Expenditure Committee
Majority: Government (6/4)
Party	Member	Electorate
National	Michael Cox	Manawatu
National	Dail Jones	Helensville
National	Doug Kidd	Marlborough
National	Don McKinnon	Rodney
National	Ian McLean	Tarawera
National	Marilyn Waring (Chairperson)	Waipa
Labour	Kerry Burke	West Coast
Labour	Mick Connelly	Yaldhurst
Labour	Roger Douglas	Manurewa
Labour	Ann Hercus	Lyttelton

=== 37th Parliament ===
The following table lists the membership of the committee during the 37th Parliament:

New Zealand House Finance and Expenditure Committee
Majority: Government (6/4)
Party	Member	Electorate
Labour	Roger Drayton	St Albans
Labour	Jonathan Hunt	New Lynn
Labour	Brian MacDonell	Dunedin Central
Labour	Jack Ridley	Taupo
Labour	Bill Rowling	Tasman
Labour	Murray Smith	Whangarei
National	George Gair	North Shore
National	Frank Gill	East Coast Bays
National	Peter Gordon	Clutha
National	Robert Muldoon	Tāmaki

== See also ==
- New Zealand House of Representatives committees
