= Puni =

Puni may refer to:

== Places ==
- Puni, Afghanistan
- Kampong Puni, a village in Brunei
- Puni, New Zealand
- Dominick Puni (born 2000), American football player
- Honiana Te Puni (died 1870), Te Ati Awa leader, government adviser
- Ivan Puni (1894–1956), Russian avant-garde artist
- Linda Te Puni, diplomat from New Zealand

== See also ==
- Puni Puni Poemy, an anime
