= Nancy Lu =

New Zealand National Party politician

Nancy Lu MP
- 陸楠
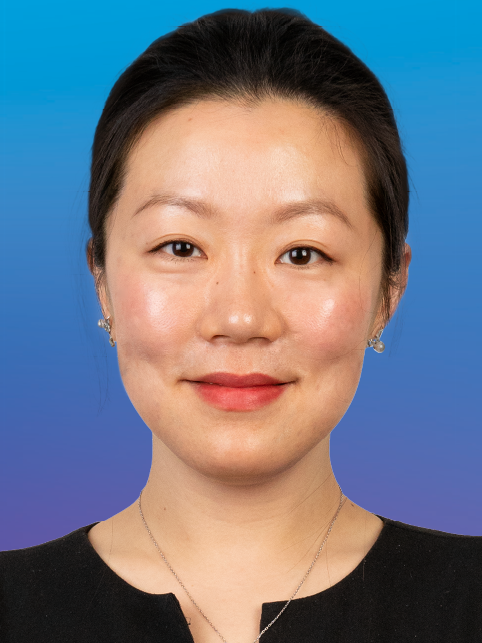
- Lu in 2023

Member of the New Zealand Parliament for National party list
- In office 25 November 2023 – 7 November 2026
- Preceded by: Andrew Bayly

Personal details
- Born: 1987 (age 38–39) Guangzhou, Guangdong, China
- Party: National

Nancy Nan Lu (Chinese: 陸楠; pinyin: Lù Nán; born 1987) is a New Zealand politician and Member of Parliament in the House of Representatives for the National Party.

== Personal life ==
Lu was born in Guangzhou, China, in 1987. She moved to New Zealand with her parents in 1997. She received her New Zealand education from Avondale Primary School, Pakuranga Intermediate, and Macleans College. She then attended Auckland University, from where she graduated with a Bachelor of Commerce in international business and accounting as a double major. Lu graduated with a Masters in Public Administration from Harvard Kennedy School of Government in May 2023. She is married with two daughters.

== Career ==
After university, Lu worked as a chartered accountant for PwC, EY, Fonterra, among others, and was based in New Zealand, Hong Kong and China. She now lives in Auckland, New Zealand. She has been a board member for the Chinese New Settlers Services Trust, an organisation that supports new Chinese immigrants in New Zealand. Lu has been a board member on ContainerCo (NZ) Ltd in New Zealand.

== Member of Parliament ==
New Zealand Parliament
Years	Term	Electorate	List	Party
2023–2026	54th	List	20	National

Lu stood as a list-only candidate for the National Party in the 2020 election, ranked 26th on the party list. She was the highest-ranking new candidate for National, ranked ahead of 17 sitting National MPs, and was given one of the few list-only slots that National allowed for. Lu was National's only candidate of Chinese ethnicity in 2020. National did not perform strongly enough for Lu to be elected.

The National Party released its list for the 2023 general election on 19 August 2023. Lu was ranked 20th, the highest-ranked candidate not already in parliament. After the election, she was the highest ranked National list candidate not elected. Andrew Bayly had been expected to win the Port Waikato seat, but another candidate for Port Waikato died after advance voting had started, so the electorate votes were not counted and Bayly was elected from the list ahead of Lu. Bayly then won a by-election for Port Waikato held on 25 November 2023 and vacated his list seat, which was taken by Lu.

Lu is a member of the Finance and Expenditure Committee and since January 2025 has been deputy chair of the Regulations Review Committee.

During the 2026 New Zealand general election, Lu was ranked 15th on the National Party list. She opted not to contest an electorate seat. Hence she was not returned to Parliament despite her improved list ranking of 15th.
