= 2023 Port Waikato by-election =

New Zealand by-election

- 25 November 2023

Port Waikato constituency of the House of Representatives
- Turnout: 18,728 (35.69%)
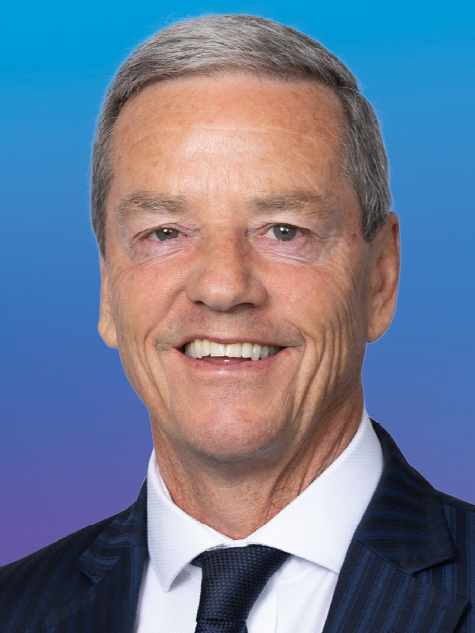

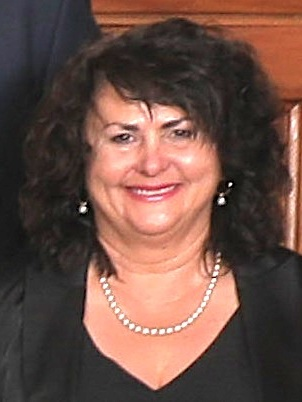
	First party	Second party
Candidate	Andrew Bayly	Casey Costello
Party	National	NZ First
Popular vote	14,296	2,864
Percentage	76.33%	15.30%
- Bayly: 50–60% 60–70% 70–80% 80–90% No polling places
MP before election
Andrew Bayly
National
Elected MP
Andrew Bayly
National

The 2023 Port Waikato by-election was held on 25 November 2023. The by-election was triggered by the death of Neil Christensen, who was a candidate for the ACT Party. Christensen's death occurred after the close of candidate nominations for the 2023 New Zealand general election, but before polling day. The by-election was won by National incumbent Andrew Bayly, who has held the Port Waikato seat and its predecessor Hunua since 2014.

== Background ==
=== 2023 general election ===
Advance voting for the 2023 general election started on 2 October 2023. Christensen's death was announced on 9 October 2023, one week into the advanced voting period. Because New Zealand uses a mixed-member proportional voting system, Port Waikato constituents continued to cast a party vote in the general election, but the electorate vote was suspended and any electorate votes already cast were nullified. It was the first time since the 1957 election that an electorate vote had been delayed due to the death of a candidate.

One of the effects of the by-election will be that the winner will add another seat to Parliament beyond those elected at the general election. At the general election, the seat that would have been filled by the Port Waikato winner was instead filled by a list MP. The winner of the by-election will also enter parliament without ejecting any existing MP.

=== Electorate ===
The Port Waikato electorate was first established in 1996, ahead of the first MMP election. The electorate was abolished in 2008 and reinstated for the 2020 election. It stretches from the Manukau Heads at the southern entrance to the Manukau Harbour, south past the eponymous settlement of Port Waikato, to Matira and Pepepe, and inland to Mangatāwhiri and the Maramarua Forest. Pukekohe is the largest population centre in the electorate. Other significant towns include Pōkeno, Te Kauwhata, Tuakau and Waiuku. The electorate includes the New Zealand Steel mill at Glenbrook, and the lower reaches of the Waikato River.

Between the 2013 and 2018 censuses, the Port Waikato electorate experienced annual average population growth of 3.3%, considerably higher than the annual average rate for New Zealand as a whole (2.1%). The electorate is predominantly European (78.2%) and Maori (19.0%), with the shares of those identifying as Asian (8.8%), and Pacific Peoples (6.1%), somewhat lower than the average for New Zealand as a whole. Over a quarter (26.3%) of families had a combined income between $100,000 and $150,000 per year – the second-largest among general electorates.

=== Election schedule ===
Key dates relating to the by-election are as follows:

10 October (Tuesday)	Port Waikato electorate by-election dates formally announced
16 October (Monday)	Writ Day Governor General issues writ directing the Electoral Commission to hold the Port Waikato by-election
20 October, noon (Friday)	Nominations close for candidates in the Port Waikato by-election
20 October (Friday)	Port Waikato by-election candidates announced by the Electoral Commission
21 October (Saturday)	Ballot paper printing starts
8 November (Wednesday)	Overseas voting starts
13 November (Monday)	Advance voting starts
24 November (Friday)	All political advertising ceases and election signs taken down by midnight
25 November (Saturday)	Election day for Port Waikato by-election Voting places open from 9am to 7pm
25 November (Saturday)	Preliminary Results progressively available from 7pm
6 December (Wednesday)	Official Results declared (including special declaration and overseas votes)
11 December (Monday)	Deadline for applications for judicial recount
12 December (Tuesday)	Return of Writ by Electoral Commission naming successful candidate (presuming no recount)
26 March 2024 (Tuesday)	Deadline for Returns of Candidate Election Expenses and Donations to Electoral Commission

== Candidates ==
All candidates had nominated to contest Port Waikato at the 2023 general election were re-nominated, unless they withdrew. On 20 October, the Labour Party announced that its candidate, Gwendoline Keel, would not contest the by-election, because the party viewed it as "unwinnable" and sought to focus on building a strong opposition against the newly elected government. Green Party candidate Karla Buchanan also withdrew her nomination, while ACT did not nominate a replacement candidate.

Party	Candidate	Background
National	Andrew Bayly	Incumbent MP for Port Waikato; originally nominated for the general election
DemocracyNZ	Scotty Bright	Originally nominated for the general election
NZ First	Casey Costello	Originally nominated for the general election
Independent	Gordon Dickson	New nomination; stood in East Coast at the general election.
NewZeal	Alfred Ngaro	New nomination; originally nominated as a list-only candidate for the general election
Women's Rights	Jill Ovens	New nomination; originally nominated as a list-only candidate for the general election
Animal Justice	Anna Rippon	Originally nominated for the general election
Vision NZ	Vijay Sudhamalla	Originally nominated for the general election
NZ Loyal	Kim Turner	Originally nominated for the general election

Andrew Bayly has held the seat since 2014. About a week before polling day, 1News described Andrew Bayly as "a clear favourite", but that he was "facing a strong challenge from NZ First's Casey Costello".

== Campaign ==
The Democracy NZ candidate, Scotty Bright, stopped campaigning and endorsed the New Zealand First candidate, Casey Costello, saying "It's about Port Waikato being represented by the best party, and we think NZ First has the best ability to do that."

== Results ==
An estimated 18,759 votes were cast in the by-election, with an estimated turnout of 35.8% of the electorate. This compares to a turnout of 78.2% for the 2023 general election.

Final results show Andrew Bayly of the National party winning with a 11,432 vote margin over his nearest rival, Casey Costello of New Zealand First.

As Bayly had already been elected as a list MP in the 2023 general election, his win meant that National elected an additional MP from its list, Nancy Lu, who became the 123rd member of parliament.

The following table shows the final results of the by-election.

2023 Port Waikato by-election
Notes: Blue background denotes the winner of the by-election. Pink background denotes a candidate elected from their party list prior to the by-election. Yellow background denotes the winner of the by-election, who was a list MP prior to the by-election. A ✓ or ✗ denotes status of any incumbent, win or lose respectively.
Party	Candidate	Votes	%	±%
National	✓ Andrew Bayly	14,296	76.33	+37.48
NZ First	Casey Costello	2,864	15.30	
NewZeal	Alfred Ngaro	409	2.18	+1.74
Animal Justice	Anna Rippon	297	1.58	
NZ Loyal	Kim Turner	237	1.27	
DemocracyNZ	Scotty Bright	225	1.20	
Women's Rights	Jill Ovens	188	1.00	
Independent	Gordon Dickson	88	0.47	
Vision NZ	Vijay Sudhamalla	48	0.26	
Informal votes		76	0.41	–1.26
Majority		11,432	61.03	+50.35
Turnout		18,728	35.69	
National hold		Swing		
