= Clevedon (disambiguation) =

Clevedon is a town and civil parish in the unitary authority of North Somerset, England.

Clevedon may also refer to:

- Clevedon, New Zealand, a rural town in New Zealand
  - Clevedon (New Zealand electorate), a former electorate, 1987–1993 and 2002–2008
- Clevedon, Queensland, an area within the City of Townsville, Queensland, Australia

== See also ==
- Cliveden
