= Norman Douglas (politician) =

New Zealand politician

Norman Douglas QSO
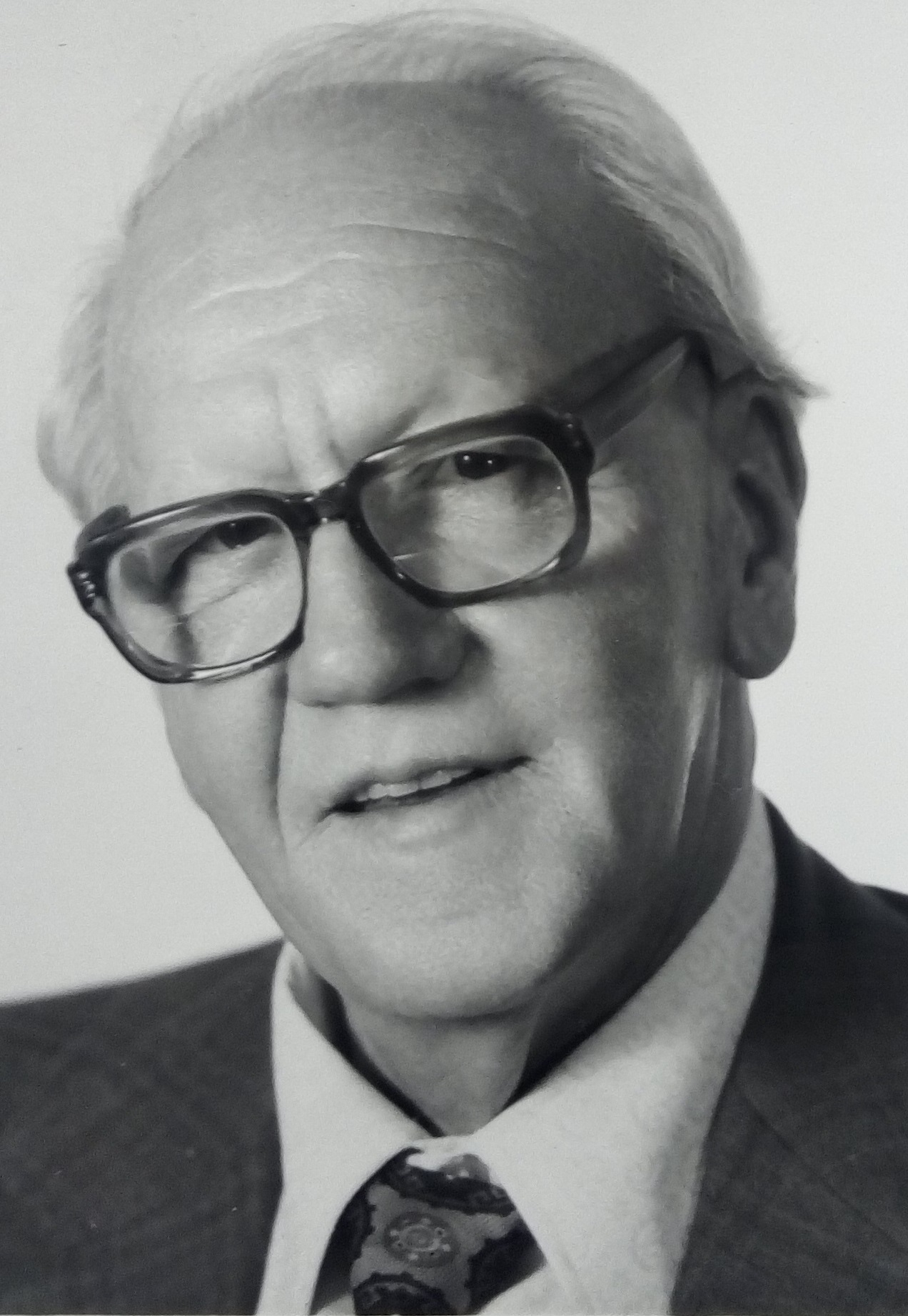
- Douglas in 1969

21st President of the Labour Party
- In office 11 May 1966 – 5 May 1970
- Vice President: Henry May; Bill Rowling
- Preceded by: Norman Kirk
- Succeeded by: Bill Rowling

Member of the New Zealand Parliament for Auckland Central
- In office 12 December 1960 – 29 November 1975
- Preceded by: Bill Anderton
- Succeeded by: Richard Prebble

Personal details
- Born: 15 March 1910 Hikurangi, New Zealand
- Died: 26 August 1985 (aged 75) Auckland, New Zealand
- Party: Labour (1932-40; 1952-85)
- Other political affiliations: Democratic Labour (1940-43)
- Spouse: Dorothy Jennie Anderton
- Children: 4 (including Roger and Malcolm Douglas)

Norman Vazey Douglas QSO (15 March 1910 – 26 August 1985) was a New Zealand trade unionist and left-wing politician. He joined the New Zealand Labour Party in 1932, but when John A. Lee was expelled from the party in 1940, Douglas followed to join the new Democratic Labour Party. He rejoined the Labour Party in 1952 and represented the Auckland Central electorate in Parliament from 1960 until his retirement in 1975, serving time on the Opposition front bench.

== Biography ==
=== Early life ===
Douglas was born in Hikurangi in 1910, the son of a policeman. He was raised in a series of several small towns due to his father's job transfers. In 1925 he left school whilst in Mercer and became an apprentice baker. He lost his left arm in a duck-shooting accident in May 1927 leading him to give up baking and undertake secondary schooling at Pukekohe Technical High School for two years. There he became an avid reader and came under the influence of his teacher, Norman Shields, who introduced Douglas to left-wing ideology.

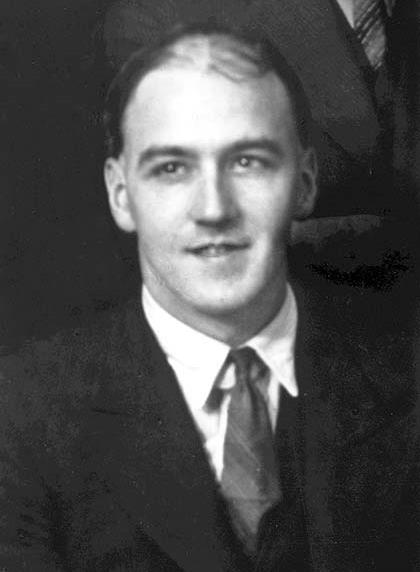
Douglas in 1938

In 1929, following his father's death, Douglas and his family moved to the Auckland suburb of Grey Lynn. There he spent one year studying a basic accountancy course via correspondence and attained a position as a clerk. This was short-lived however as after the onset of the Great Depression he was to spend four years either unemployed or underemployed. In 1934 he was eventually employed in a part-time clerical position at the Department of Labour.

=== Early political career ===
Whilst he was unemployed Douglas joined the Grey Lynn branch of the Labour Party in 1932, he became a close friend of member of parliament (MP) John A. Lee (who lost his left arm in World War I). He became president of the branch in 1935. In May of that same year he was elected to the Auckland City Council as a Labour Party candidate. He served three years as a councillor, chairing the council's library committee, until he was defeated standing for re-election in 1938. He then became the assistant secretary of the Auckland Coach and Car Builders' Union and the Auckland Brewers', Wine and Spirit Merchants' Employees' Union in 1936, and then secretary of both unions the following year, remaining in that post for the latter union until 1963. He was secretary of the Auckland Trades Council from 1939 to 1941 and led the Labour Party's Junior Labour League. He was later also secretary of the Auckland Journalists' Union.

When Lee was expelled from the Labour Party in 1940, Douglas left also and helped him set up the Democratic Labour Party (DLP). Soon after the DLP was created the party had an opportunity to gain another seat in parliament at a 1940 by-election in Auckland West. Douglas was approached by the DLP membership to contest the by-election in an effort to boost the new party's publicity, but he declined to stand. He was a member of the party's national executive and edited John A. Lee's Weekly. He ran for Parliament in a 1941 by-election in Waitemata and in the 1943 election for the Onehunga electorate as a DLP candidate but was defeated. He then operated a bookselling business for about 15 years from 1944, first with Lee and then on his own after he and Lee fell out in 1954.

=== Member of Parliament ===
New Zealand Parliament
Years	Term	Electorate	Party
1960–1963	33rd	Auckland Central	Labour
1963–1966	34th	Auckland Central	Labour
1966–1969	35th	Auckland Central	Labour
1969–1972	36th	Auckland Central	Labour
1972–1975	37th	Auckland Central	Labour

Douglas was re-admitted to the Labour Party in 1952. He proceeded to become secretary of the Auckland Central branch of which his father-in-law Bill Anderton was the sitting MP for. As secretary Douglas undertook much constituency work on Anderton's behalf. Once Anderton had done everything in his power to ensure Douglas would succeed him as Labour's nominee in Auckland Central, he announced his retirement from Parliament in August 1960. In October of that year Douglas was selected to replace him in the seat. Despite Douglas being fully qualified and experienced of his subsequent nomination, many in the Labour Party regarded his succession to Anderton as an act of nepotism.

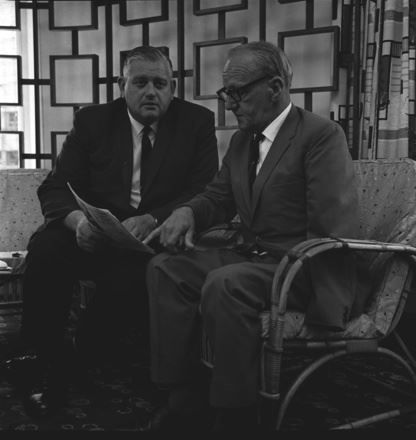
Norman Kirk (left) and Douglas (right) in 1967

In December 1965 he stood for the deputy leadership of the Labour Party, but gained only 2 votes. Douglas was elected as president of the Labour Party in May 1966. He retained the position until 1970 when he did not seek re-election. Douglas also sat on the Opposition front bench. He served as spokesperson for a succession of portfolios from 1967 to 1972 including education, social security and industrial relations and immigration. Douglas was downhearted by Labour's shock defeat at the 1969 election and he notified national secretary of the party that he would not seek re-election at the 1972 election, a decision which he later reneged.

When Labour finally came to power in 1972, Douglas missed out on selection for cabinet and took himself to the back benches in disappointment. His son, and parliamentary colleague, Roger, only 34, did win a place in the ballot for Cabinet. Douglas did not hide his bitter resentment. The day of the ballot, Prime Minister Norman Kirk was so concerned by the extremity of Douglas' reaction, and its effects on his son, that he called Douglas' wife Jennie to enlist her help regarding Douglas' lack of consideration for Roger's feelings. Kirk told his secretary Margaret Hayward, "It should have been the best day of Roger's life but instead it was the worst". For months afterwards Douglas was inconsolable and declined Kirk's offer of a position as an under-secretary. Following Kirk's sudden death in 1974 a complete re-selection of cabinet occurred and Douglas put himself forward once again. Another narrow defeat ensued, however this time he accepted it with comparative tranquility. He did derive fulfillment in his final term in parliament out of chairing the select committee which brought down a landmark report in June 1975 about the discrimination against women in New Zealand and their role in society.

He then retired from Parliament at the 1975 general election. In 1975 he was appointed a member of the Winston Churchill Memorial Trust Board.

=== Later life and death ===
In retirement Douglas worked at his family's herbal product business, Red Seal Laboratories. In the 1976 New Year Honours, Douglas was appointed a Companion of the Queens Service Order for public services.

He remained politically active and at the 1978 general election he was fervently involved in his son Malcolm's successful campaign for the Hunua electorate.

Douglas was briefly admitted to hospital in May 1983, after which his health steadily began to decline. He died in Auckland in 1985, aged 75. His funeral service was held at the Auckland Trades Hall which was attended by Prime Minister David Lange and Auckland Central MP Richard Prebble who gave a eulogy.

== Personal life ==
Douglas married Dorothy Jennie Anderton, a daughter of fellow politician Bill Anderton, in 1937. They had one daughter and three sons. Two sons, Roger Douglas and Malcolm Douglas, also became Labour MPs, the former becoming Minister of Finance and later founder and leader of the right-wing ACT New Zealand party.

== Notes ==
New Zealand Parliament
Preceded by Bill Anderton	Member of Parliament for Auckland Central; 1960–1975	Succeeded by Richard Prebble
Party political offices
Preceded by Norman Kirk	President of the Labour Party; 1966–1970	Succeeded by Bill Rowling
