= Paul Hutchison (politician) =

New Zealand politician

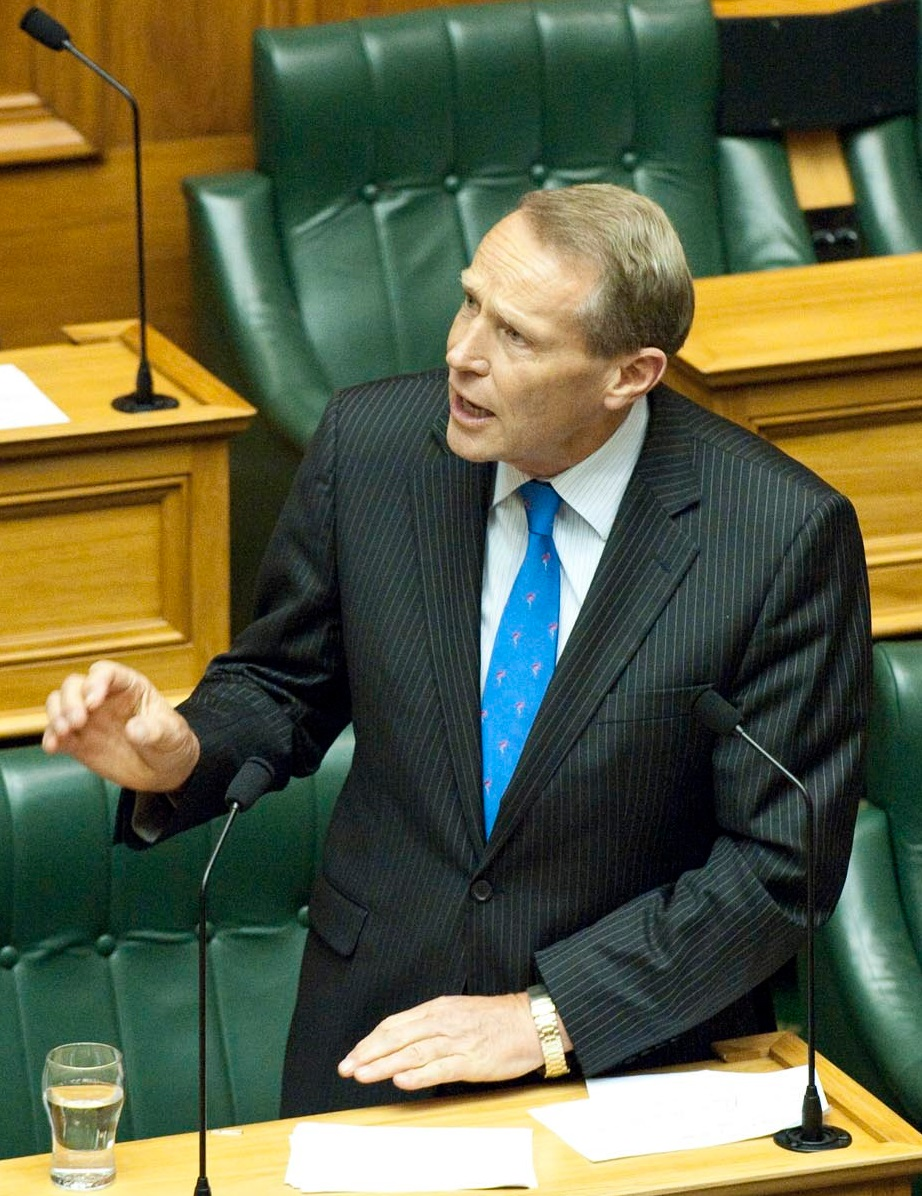
- Paul Hutchison in 2013

Member of the New Zealand Parliament for Hunua
- In office 8 November 2008 – 14 August 2014
- Succeeded by: Andrew Bayly
- Majority: 15,858 (46.60%)

Member of the New Zealand Parliament for Port Waikato
- In office 27 November 1999 – 8 November 2008
- Preceded by: Bill Birch
- Majority: 13,498 (37.65%) (Note: At 2005 election)

Personal details
- Born: 1947 (age 78–79) Wellington
- Party: National
- Website: drpaulhutchison.co.nz

Charles Paul Telford Hutchison, known as Paul Hutchison (born 1947) is a New Zealand politician, health professional, and current Honorary Consul in New Zealand for Papua New Guinea. He is a member of the National Party, which he represented in the House of Representatives from 1999 to 2014.

== Early years ==
Hutchison was born in Wellington, and attended Khandallah School and Onslow College. He is a graduate of the University of Otago with an MB ChB in 1970, and was a consulting specialist in obstetrics and gynaecology with his pre parliament medical career spanning almost 30 years.

== Member of Parliament ==
New Zealand Parliament
Years	Term	Electorate	List	Party
1999–2002	46th	Port Waikato	38	National
2002–2005	47th	Port Waikato	27	National
2005–2008	48th	Port Waikato	23	National
2008–2011	49th	Hunua	23	National
2011–2014	50th	Hunua	26	National

Hutchison was first elected to Parliament as the MP for Port Waikato in the 1999 election, and was re-elected in the 2002 election and 2005 election, and for Hunua in the 2008 and 2011 elections, with increasing majorities each time.

As an MP he has held a number of health-related roles, including opposition Spokesperson for Health, and Chairperson of the Health Committee. He was one of only two National Party MPs to support the successful Smokefree Environments Amendment Act 2003. He voted against the Death with Dignity euthanasia bill, also in 2003.

He was seen reading while driving by a motorist in September 2009, prompting Acting Prime Minister Bill English to warn MPs to adhere to driving regulations.

As Chairman of the Health select committee (2009 to 2014), Hutchison steered five significant inquiries, including on Immunisation, prostate cancer, and "Improving Child health outcomes and preventing child abuse from preconception until 3 years of age." The latter had strong bipartisan support and a special parliamentary debate was held to emphasise its importance.

Hutchison announced in October 2013 that he was going to retire from Parliament at the 2014 general election.

Following his retirement Dr Hutchison was honoured by the New Zealand Medical Association with the chairman's award for making ,"an outstanding contribution to health in New Zealand", and for his services as chair of the Health Select Committee.

Hutchison was succeeded as the MP for Hunua by Andrew Bayly also of the New Zealand National Party.

== Post Parliament Career ==
Following retirement from Parliament, Dr Hutchison remains very active in a number of roles.

He continues to practice medicine in a high needs practice in South Auckland and is on the board of a number of private and public companies including as a Trustee for Entrust and a director of Vector. With his family, he has a conservation block in Northland where he has planted over 26000 native trees.

Hutchison is married with four daughters.

New Zealand Parliament
Preceded by Bill Birch	Member of Parliament for Port Waikato; 1999–2008	Vacant Constituency abolished, recreated in 2020 Title next held by Andrew Bayly
Vacant Constituency recreated after abolition in 2002 Title last held by Warren Kyd	Member of Parliament for Hunua; 2008–2014	Succeeded by Andrew Bayly
