= Puni, New Zealand =

Puni
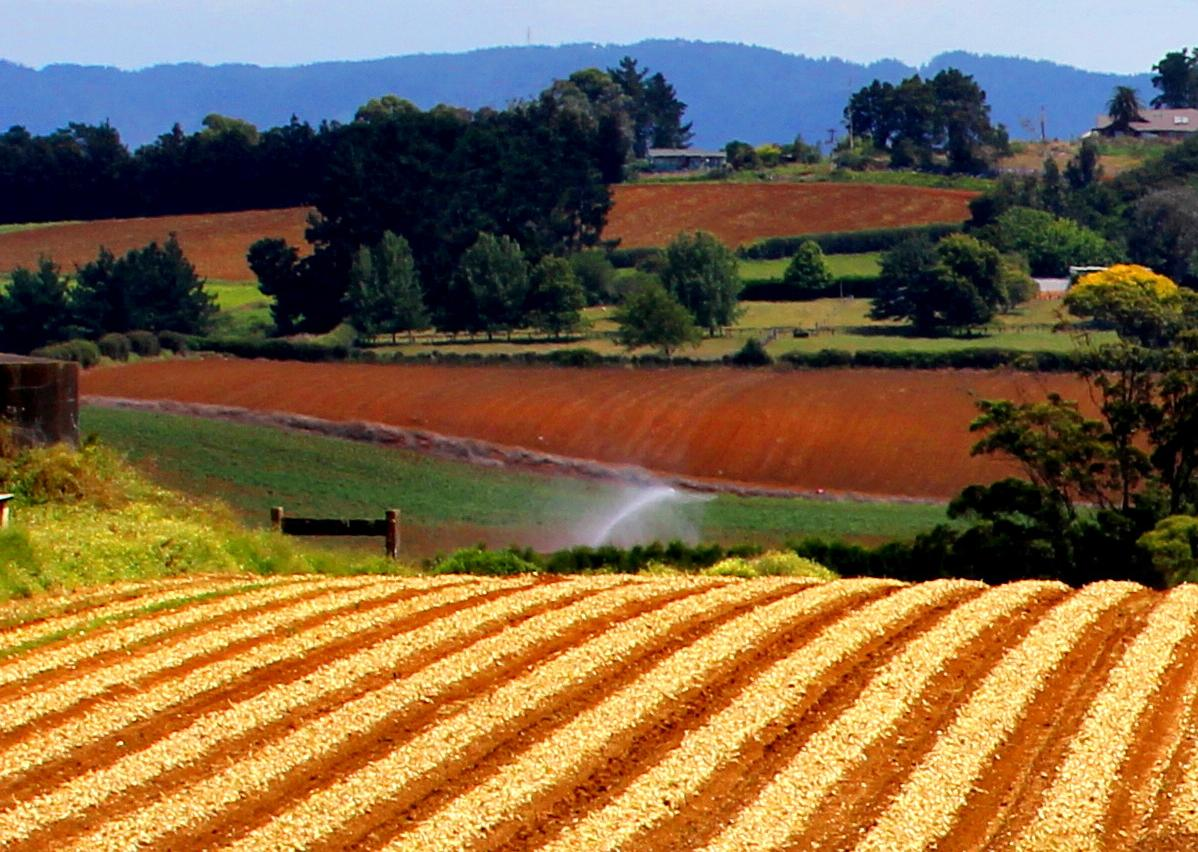
- An onion field in Puni
- Interactive map of Puni
- Coordinates: 37.2330°S 174.8556°E
- Country: New Zealand
- Region: Auckland Region
- Ward: Franklin ward
- Board: Franklin Local Board
- Electorates: Port Waikato; Hauraki-Waikato (Māori)

Government
  - Territorial Authority: Auckland Council
  - Mayor of Auckland: Wayne Brown
  - Port Waikato MP: Andrew Bayly
  - Hauraki-Waikato MP: Hana-Rawhiti Maipi-Clarke

Area
  - Total: 39.22 km^{2} (15.14 sq mi)

Population (June 2025)
  - Total: 1,680
  - Density: 42.8/km^{2} (111/sq mi)

Puni is a rural locality in the Franklin ward of Auckland in the North Island of New Zealand. It is predominantly a dairy farming and market gardening area. The main type of crops grown are potatoes, carrots, and onions.

Puni is located between the larger towns of Pukekohe and Waiuku.

== Demographics ==
Puni covers 39.22 km^{2} (15.14 sq mi) and had an estimated population of 1,680 as of June 2025, with a population density of 43 people per km^{2}.

Historical population
Year	Pop.	±% p.a.
2006	1,461	—
2013	1,593	+1.24%
2018	1,653	+0.74%
2023	1,635	−0.22%
The 2006 population is for a smaller area of 38.19 km^{2}. Source:

Puni had a population of 1,635 in the 2023 New Zealand census, a decrease of 18 people (−1.1%) since the 2018 census, and an increase of 42 people (2.6%) since the 2013 census. There were 837 males, 792 females and 6 people of other genders in 504 dwellings. 2.6% of people identified as LGBTIQ+. The median age was 42.2 years (compared with 38.1 years nationally). There were 276 people (16.9%) aged under 15 years, 312 (19.1%) aged 15 to 29, 744 (45.5%) aged 30 to 64, and 303 (18.5%) aged 65 or older.

People could identify as more than one ethnicity. The results were 71.4% European (Pākehā); 13.8% Māori; 8.8% Pasifika; 16.7% Asian; 0.6% Middle Eastern, Latin American and African New Zealanders (MELAA); and 2.9% other, which includes people giving their ethnicity as "New Zealander". English was spoken by 94.3%, Māori language by 2.2%, Samoan by 0.6%, and other languages by 17.4%. No language could be spoken by 2.6% (e.g. too young to talk). New Zealand Sign Language was known by 0.4%. The percentage of people born overseas was 21.5, compared with 28.8% nationally.

Religious affiliations were 30.3% Christian, 3.7% Hindu, 0.9% Islam, 0.7% Māori religious beliefs, 0.7% Buddhist, 0.2% New Age, and 2.8% other religions. People who answered that they had no religion were 51.6%, and 9.5% of people did not answer the census question.

Of those at least 15 years old, 207 (15.2%) people had a bachelor's or higher degree, 789 (58.1%) had a post-high school certificate or diploma, and 363 (26.7%) people exclusively held high school qualifications. The median income was $45,200, compared with $41,500 nationally. 165 people (12.1%) earned over $100,000 compared to 12.1% nationally. The employment status of those at least 15 was that 762 (56.1%) people were employed full-time, 183 (13.5%) were part-time, and 33 (2.4%) were unemployed.

== Education ==
Puni School is a contributing primary school (years 1–6) with a roll of 206. The school was founded in 1878.

Mauku School is a contributing primary school (years 1–6) with a roll of 154. It is a little more than 4 km northwest of Puni School, and was opened in 1883.

Both schools are coeducational. Rolls are as of July 2026.
