= Malcolm Douglas (politician) =

New Zealand politician

Member of the New Zealand Parliament for Hunua
- In office 25 November 1978 – 24 May 1979
- Preceded by: New electorate
- Succeeded by: Winston Peters

Personal details
- Born: 1941 (age 84–85) Auckland, New Zealand
- Party: Labour
- Relations: Bill Anderton (grandfather); Norman Douglas (father); Roger Douglas (brother)
- Education: University of Auckland
- Occupation: Lawyer

Malcolm Douglas (born 1941) is a former New Zealand politician who represented the Labour Party. He lives in Karaka south of Auckland.

== Biography ==
=== Early life and career ===
Before entering parliament Douglas was a lawyer. He had studied law at University of Auckland and after graduating was employed as a law clerk at Haigh, Charters & Carthy. He was also the coach of the Manurewa Marlins rugby league team.

=== Political career ===
New Zealand Parliament
Years	Term	Electorate	Party
1978–1979	39th	Hunua	Labour

While studying law at university he was a member of Princes Street Labour. Douglas made his first foray into politics in 1975 when he unsuccessfully sought the Labour Party candidacy for Onehunga following the retirement of Hugh Watt. In early 1977 he contemplated standing as a candidate for the Labour Party nomination in the Mangere by-election, however he ultimately decided to withdraw from the candidacy race.

He then put his name forward for the newly created seat in south Auckland, Hunua, defeating former cabinet minister Colin Moyle to win nomination. He won the election and represented the Hunua electorate from 25 November 1978 after the 1978 general election, until 24 May 1979, when he was unseated by a decision of the Electoral Court in favour of National Party candidate Winston Peters. The court declared Peters elected on election night. The petition involved the methods of voting allowable, 'ticks and crosses'.

Following his ejection from Parliament, Douglas then unsuccessfully stood for the Labour nomination at the 1980 Onehunga by-election. Douglas garnered much support among local members and quickly became a frontrunner in the race and won the floor vote of members at the selection meeting, with over twice as many votes as the next two candidates (Dorothy Jelicich and Fred Gerbic) combined. However he still ended up losing, with Gerbic getting the nod. Later in 1980 he put his name forward to replace long serving MP Warren Freer in the safe Labour seat of Mount Albert, but missed out on the nomination to Helen Clark. In 1981 he stood for nomination in the Roskill electorate, losing out on nomination to Phil Goff.

In 1990, Douglas was awarded the New Zealand 1990 Commemoration Medal.

He is a son of Norman Douglas and a brother of Roger Douglas, both (ex) Labour Party politicians. Malcolm Douglas managed his brother's 2008 election campaign in the Hunua electorate when he stood for ACT New Zealand; he came third in the electorate, but was elected as number three on the party list.

== Notes ==
New Zealand Parliament
New constituency	Member of Parliament for Hunua; 1978–1979	Succeeded by Winston Peters
