= Bill Anderton =

New Zealand politician

The Honourable Bill Anderton
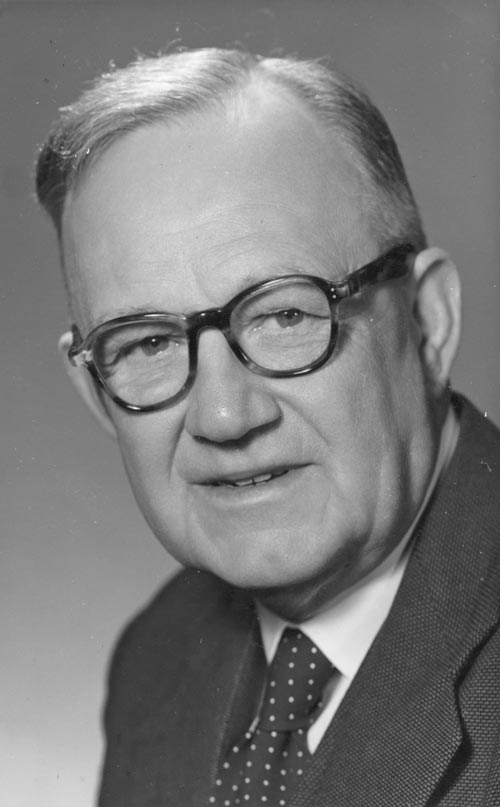

16th Minister of Internal Affairs
- In office 12 December 1957 – 12 December 1960
- Prime Minister: Walter Nash
- Preceded by: Sid Smith
- Succeeded by: Leon Götz

Member of the New Zealand Parliament for Eden
- In office 27 November 1935 – 27 November 1946
- Preceded by: Arthur Stallworthy
- Succeeded by: Wilfred Fortune

Member of the New Zealand Parliament for Auckland Central
- In office 27 November 1946 – 12 December 1960
- Preceded by: Bill Parry
- Succeeded by: Norman Douglas

Personal details
- Born: William Theophilus Anderton; 16 March 1891 West Bromwich, Staffordshire, England
- Died: 20 January 1966 (aged 74) Ōrākei, Auckland, New Zealand
- Party: Labour
- Spouse: Annie Gertrude Mason (m. 1913)
- Relations: Norman Douglas (son-in-law); Malcolm Douglas (grandson); Roger Douglas (grandson)
- Children: Two daughters, one son

Military service
- Allegiance: British Army
- Branch/service: Royal Artillery
- Battles/wars: World War I

William Theophilus Anderton (16 March 1891 – 20 January 1966) was a New Zealand politician of the Labour Party. He served as Minister of Internal Affairs in the second Labour Government, from 1957 to 1960.

== Early life ==
Anderton was born in West Bromwich, Staffordshire, England. He married Annie Gertrude Mason in 1913, and they had two daughters and one son. He served in the British Army (Royal Artillery) in World War I. The family arrived in New Zealand in 1921 and settled in Christchurch for a year, before moving to Auckland.

== Political career ==
New Zealand Parliament
Years	Term	Electorate	Party
1935–1938	26th	Eden	Labour
1938–1943	28th	Eden	Labour
1943–1946	27th	Eden	Labour
1946–1949	28th	Auckland Central	Labour
1949–1951	29th	Auckland Central	Labour
1951–1954	30th	Auckland Central	Labour
1954–1957	31st	Auckland Central	Labour
1957–1960	32nd	Auckland Central	Labour

In 1933 Anderton was elected to the Auckland City Council on a Labour Party ticket. He was re-elected in both 1935 and 1938 but was defeated in 1941. In 1944 he was Labour's candidate for Mayor of Auckland City, but was defeated by John Allum in an election which saw all Labour candidates defeated.

Anderton was one of five candidates for the Eden electorate in the 1931 election, and came second after the incumbent, Arthur Stallworthy of the United Party. He represented the Eden electorate from 1935 to 1946, and then the Auckland Central electorate from 1946 to 1960, when he retired.

In 1947 Anderton was one of three Labour MPs who supported Frank Langstone's contentious proposal that the government make the state-owned Bank of New Zealand the sole legal issuer of bank credit over loans and overdrafts in an attempt to secure state control over the means of exchange. The proposal was rejected as too radical however.

In 1953, Anderton was awarded the Queen Elizabeth II Coronation Medal.

Anderton was an agitator against the leadership of Walter Nash during Labour's spell in opposition in the 1950s. He was one of the main instigators of the challenge to Nash in June 1954, which was unsuccessful. As a result, Anderton together with Phil Connolly and Arnold Nordmeyer were called before Labour's National Executive and given warnings about the threat of divisiveness to the party.

After Labour won the 1957 election Anderton was nominated as a candidate for the position of Speaker of the New Zealand House of Representatives, but lost the caucus ballot to Christchurch mayor Robert Macfarlane. He was then nominated to stand for a seat in cabinet in the Second Labour Government. In the third ballot for the final seat he was tied with Mount Albert MP Warren Freer. Freer cast his own vote in the next ballot for the 66 year old Anderton out of gratitude as he had helped Freer into politics years earlier.

He was appointed as Minister of Internal Affairs and Minister of Civil Defence from 1957 to 1960 in the Second Labour Government.

== Private life ==
Anderton was the father-in-law of Labour MP Norman Douglas. Two of Anderton's grandchildren, brothers Malcolm and Roger Douglas, also became MPs. He died in the Auckland suburb of Ōrākei in 1966.

== Notes ==
Political offices
Preceded by Sid Smith	Minister of Internal Affairs; 1957–1960	Succeeded by Leon Götz
New Zealand Parliament
Preceded by Arthur Stallworthy	Member of Parliament for Eden; 1935–46	Succeeded by Wilfred Fortune
Preceded by Bill Parry	Member of Parliament for Auckland Central; 1946–60	Succeeded by Norman Douglas
