= Clevedon (New Zealand electorate) =

Clevedon was a New Zealand parliamentary electorate from 1987 to 1993 and then from 2002 to 2008. For the first six-year period the electorate was represented by Warren Kyd. For the second six-year period, the electorate was represented by Judith Collins.

== Population centres ==
The 1987 electoral redistribution took the continued population growth in the North Island into account, and two additional general electorates were created, bringing the total number of electorates to 97. In the South Island, the shift of population to Christchurch had continued. Overall, three electorates were newly created (including Clevedon), three electorates were recreated, and four electorates were abolished. All of those electorates were in the North Island. Changes in the South Island were restricted to boundary changes. These changes came into effect with the 1987 election.

Clevedon took in the urban population centres of Flat Bush, Botany Downs and Dannemora to the west, Beachlands and Maraetai to the north and the sparsely populated Hunua Ranges to the east. Under finalised boundary changes for the 2008 general election, the Clevedon electorate ceased to exist, with its population centres being distributed among the new Botany electorate, a redrawn and renamed electorate of Papakura and the resurrected Hunua electorate.

== History ==
The Clevedon electorate was first created in 1987. Warren Kyd of the National Party was the electorate's first representative. When the electorate was abolished in 1993, Kyd transferred to the Hauraki electorate.

The electorate was recreated for the 2002 election, replacing the Hunua electorate, where Kyd had been the incumbent. In a rare event for the National Party, an incumbent was successfully challenged by newcomer Judith Collins, with allegations being made that controversial party president Michelle Boag played a part in the decision. Collins won the nomination and the subsequent election. After the Clevedon electorate was abolished for the 2008 election, Collins won the Papakura electorate.

=== Members of Parliament ===
Key

National

Election	Winner
1987 election	Warren Kyd
1990 election	Warren Kyd
(Electorate abolished 1993–2002; see Hauraki and Hunua)
2002 election	Judith Collins
2005 election	Judith Collins
(Electorate abolished in 2008; see Papakura)

=== List MPs ===
Election	Winner
2002 election	Brent Catchpole
2002 election	Dave Hereora
2005 election	Dave Hereora

== Election results ==
=== 2005 election ===
2005 general election: Clevedon
Notes:	Blue background denotes the winner of the electorate vote. Pink background denotes a candidate elected from their party list. Yellow background denotes an electorate win by a list member, or other incumbent. A ✓ or ✗ denotes status of any incumbent, win or lose respectively.						
Party	Candidate	Votes	%	±%	Party votes	%	±%
National	✓ Judith Collins	21,828	59.23	+21.54	19,527	51.82	+27.39
Labour	Dave Hereora	8,957	24.31	−3.25	11,866	31.61	−2.19
NZ First	Brent Catchpole	2,010	5.45	−6.40	2,523	6.72	−6.99
Green	Steve Bayliss	1,424	3.86	−0.77	924	2.46	−1.41
United Future	John L. Walker	882	2.39		808	2.51	−4.67
ACT	Iain Ogilvie	500	1.36	−4.85	903	2.41	−8.85
Progressive	Brenda Hill	450	1.22	+0.12	381	0.37	−0.64
Destiny	Mason Chet Lee	390	1.06		218	0.58	
Māori Party	David Sinclair King	311	0.84		199	0.53	
Family Rights	Lale Ene-Ulugia	56	0.15		17	0.05	
Direct Democracy	Leanne Martinovich	42	0.11		16	0.04	
Legalise Cannabis					68	0.18	−0.20
Christian Heritage					48	0.13	−1.21
Libertarianz					16	0.04	
Alliance					11	0.03	−0.66
Democrats					7	0.02	
99 MP					5	0.01	
One NZ					4	0.01	−0.03
RONZ					3	0.01	
Informal votes		401			140		
Total valid votes		36,850			37,544		
National hold	Majority	12,871	34.93				

=== 2002 election ===
2002 general election: Clevedon
Notes:	Blue background denotes the winner of the electorate vote. Pink background denotes a candidate elected from their party list. Yellow background denotes an electorate win by a list member, or other incumbent. A ✓ or ✗ denotes status of any incumbent, win or lose respectively.						
Party	Candidate	Votes	%	±%	Party votes	%	±%
National	Judith Collins	11,627	37.69		7,764	24.43	
Labour	Dave Hereora	8,500	27.56		10,739	33.80	
NZ First	Brent Catchpole	3,655	11.85		4,355	13.71	
Independent	Glenn Archibald	2,263	7.34				
ACT	John Thompson	1,914	6.21		3,578	11.26	
Green	Sue Cowie	1,427	4.63		1,229	3.87	
Christian Heritage	David Arvidson	891	2.89		426	1.34	
Progressive	Arthur Toms	340	1.10		320	1.01	
Alliance	Nick Corlett	229	0.74		218	0.69	
United Future					2,281	7.18	
ORNZ					350	1.10	
Legalise Cannabis					122	0.38	
One NZ					14	0.04	
Mana Māori					13	0.04	
NMP					6	0.02	
Informal votes		359			70		
Total valid votes		30,846			31,775		
National win new seat	Majority	3,127	10.14				

=== 1990 election ===
1990 general election: Clevedon
Party	Candidate	Votes	%	±%
National	Warren Kyd	10,851	55.1	+4.7
Labour	Ann Batten	6,119	31.0	
Green	Jacqui Burgess	1,831	9.3	
NewLabour	So'otaga So'otaga	476	2.4	
Social Credit	Tania Carr	231	1.1	
Democrats	Huia Mitchell	165	0.8	
Majority		4,732	24.0	+19.5
Turnout		19,681		

=== 1987 election ===
1987 general election: Clevedon
Party	Candidate	Votes	%	±%
National	Warren Kyd	9,129	50.4	
Labour	Lee Goffin	8,302	45.9	
Democrats	G C Pilgrim	664	3.7	
Majority		827	4.5	
Turnout		20,928	89.7	
