= Warren Kyd =

New Zealand politician

Warren James Kyd MNZM (born 21 November 1939) is a lawyer and former New Zealand politician.

== Early life ==
Kyd was born in Auckland and educated at Mount Albert Grammar School and the University of Auckland. Before entering politics, Kyd was a lawyer. He has four children.

== Politics ==
New Zealand Parliament
| Years | Term | Electorate | List | Party |
|---|---|---|---|---|
| 1987–1990 | 42nd | Clevedon | | National |
| 1990–1993 | 43rd | Clevedon | | National |
| 1993–1996 | 44th | Hauraki | | National |
| 1996–1999 | 45th | Hunua | 40 | National |
| 1999–2002 | 46th | Hunua | none | National |

Kyd was a member of parliament from 1987 to 2002 for the National Party. He was first elected to Parliament in the 1987 election, becoming MP for Clevedon. He held this seat until the 1993 election, when he became MP for Hauraki. In the 1996 election, he became MP for Hunua. In the 2002 election, the Hunua seat was abolished, and Kyd put himself forward for selection as National's candidate in the restored Clevedon seat. Despite a tradition that sitting MPs are not challenged if they seek re-selection, Kyd was defeated by newcomer Judith Collins, with allegations being made that controversial party president Michelle Boag played a part in the decision. Compared to some, Kyd was relatively accepting of his defeat – Brian Neeson, another MP who was not re-selected, eventually quit the National Party to stand as an independent. While in Parliament, Kyd served for a time as a Parliamentary Undersecretary.

== After politics ==
In the 2003 Queen's Birthday Honours, Kyd was appointed a Member of the New Zealand Order of Merit, for public services as a Member of Parliament In 2004, he was appointed chairman of the Auckland Energy Consumer Trust.

New Zealand Parliament
| Vacant Constituency recreated after abolition in 1987 Title last held by Graeme Lee (politician) | Member of Parliament for Hauraki; 1993–1996 | Constituency abolished |
