= Andrew Bayly =

New Zealand politician

The Honourable Andrew Bayly FRGS MP
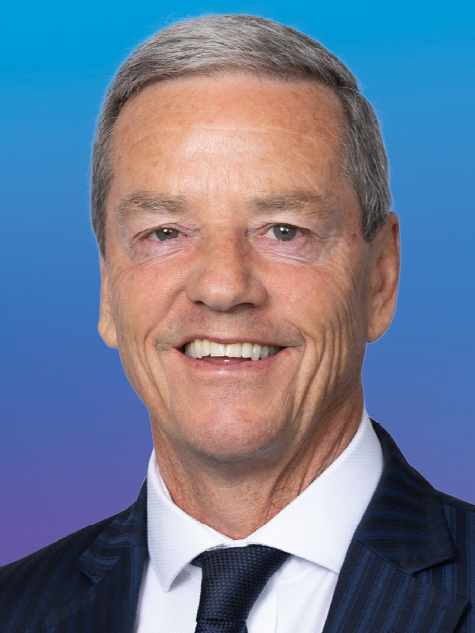
- Bayly in 2023

16th Minister of Commerce and Consumer Affairs
- In office 27 November 2023 – 24 February 2025
- Prime Minister: Christopher Luxon
- Preceded by: Duncan Webb
- Succeeded by: Scott Simpson

18th Minister for ACC
- In office 24 January 2025 – 24 February 2025
- Prime Minister: Christopher Luxon
- Preceded by: Matt Doocey
- Succeeded by: Scott Simpson

1st Minister for Small Business and Manufacturing
- In office 27 November 2023 – 24 January 2025
- Prime Minister: Christopher Luxon
- Preceded by: Office established
- Succeeded by: Chris Penk

33rd Minister of Statistics
- In office 27 November 2023 – 24 January 2025
- Prime Minister: Christopher Luxon
- Preceded by: Deborah Russell
- Succeeded by: Shane Reti

Member of the New Zealand Parliament for Port Waikato Hunua (2014–2020)
- Incumbent
- Assumed office 25 November 2023
- In office 20 September 2014 – 14 October 2023
- Preceded by: Paul Hutchison

Member of the New Zealand Parliament for National party list
- In office 14 October 2023 – 25 November 2023
- Succeeded by: Nancy Lu

Personal details
- Born: 1962 (age 63–64) Whanganui, New Zealand
- Party: National
- Education: Massey University
- Profession: Merchant banker

Andrew Henry Bayly FRGS MP (born 1962) is a New Zealand businessman, adventurer, and politician. He was elected to the New Zealand Parliament at the 2014 general election as the MP for Hunua, representing the New Zealand National Party. He is currently the MP for Port Waikato.

He was Minister of Commerce and Consumer Affairs, Minister of Statistics, and Minister for Small Business and Manufacturing in the Sixth National Government. He resigned his ministerial portfolios in February 2025 after he physically touched a staff member during an argument. In March 2026, Bayly confirmed he would not contest the Port Waikato seat but would seek to stand as a List MP. In June 2026, he confirmed that he would be retiring from Parliament at the 2026 New Zealand general election.

== Early life and family ==
Bayly was born in Whanganui and has a twin brother. He attended Wanganui Collegiate School and graduated with a degree in accounting and finance from Massey University. He was a merchant banker and is a Fellow of Chartered Accountants Australia and New Zealand, the NZ Institute of Management, the NZ Chartered Institute of Corporate Management, and the UK Chartered Association of Certified Accountants.

In the 1970s, while a student, Bayly accidentally shot his brother in the leg while climbing a fence with a gun. While his brother was left with heavy scarring, his leg was saved.

Bayly was an officer in the New Zealand Army Territorials and also served in the British Parachute Regiment. He is a Fellow of the Royal Geographical Society in London.

Bayly is married and has three children.

== Business career ==
Bayly worked as a merchant banker, founding the Cranleigh firm with his brother Paul, where he offered corporate advisory and capital markets advice to a range of government entities, local authorities and corporate clients. Cranleigh has offices in New Zealand, Australia and Singapore.

He was a director of numerous companies, the chair of the board of New Zealand Financial Planning and a trustee of the Enterprise Franklin Development Trust, the economic development arm of the Franklin Council.

Bayly is a former director of Envirofert, an organic compost product company that received the prestigious “Green Ribbon Award” in 2010 for making an outstanding contribution to protecting the environment. Envirofert receives around 40,000 tonnes of green waste and building products every year, and turns most of it into beneficial products, including compost and gypsum.

== Adventurer ==
Bayly had a long career in adventure racing, including competing in three Coast to Coast events, marathons and Ironman events. He is a mountaineer and has climbed Aoraki / Mount Cook, Mount Aspiring / Tititea, and four mountains in Antarctica, including Vinson Massif, the highest mountain in Antarctica. In the summer of 2012/13, he dragged a sled 112 kilometres (70 mi) to the South Pole. In 2016, he and one of his children dragged sledges 120 kilometres (75 mi) to the North Pole, raising $10,000 for the Kōkako Recovery Programme in the Hunua Ranges.

In January 2019, Bayly and one of his children spent a month on a guided trek of 500 kilometres (310 mi) across Jordan on camels, retracing the routes of Lawrence of Arabia when he worked with Arab forces during the First World War, as described in his book, Seven Pillars of Wisdom. travelling and eating with some Bedouin, Bayly was able to confirm a number of the claims made by Lawrence. However, Bayly disputed Lawrence’s claim that he could ride his camels up to 80 to 120 miles a day. Taking into account the time involved in collecting firewood and cooking and time for prayers, Bayly’s experience was that a fully laden camel could ably cover up to 50 to 80 kilometres (31 to 50 miles) in a day, but only for a few days at most. Bayly’s article about their experience was published in the T. E. Lawrence Society journal, August 2019 edition.

In late December 2022, Bayly travelled to the northernmost province of Mongolia with one of his children to spend time with the Dukha people, one of the last groups of nomadic reindeer herders in the world. They spent two weeks living with a Dukha family, riding reindeer 20–30 kilometres (12–19 mi) a day, herding the reindeer and protecting them from attacks by wolves. One of the aims of the trip was to raise awareness of the Dukha and the precarious nature of their lives. Climate change has adversely affected the terrain inhabited by the Dukha and has led to a decline in reindeer herds. Given the harsh realities of their life and the reducing herds, the Dukha are unlikely to continue their nomadic way of life, and the tradition is likely to die over the next couple of decades. Bayly engaged a New Zealand film producer and arranged for a Mongolian cameraman to accompany them to record the trip, with a view to making a documentary that will eventually be promoted overseas.

In June 2024, Bayly participated in the NZ Cancer Society's Jump For Cancer 2024 campaign, jumping out of a plane at 16,000 feet and raising over $30,000 in donations. The campaign's funds support cancer patients and their families, from diagnosis through to post-treatment, and support cancer prevention policy and life-saving cancer research.

== Political career ==
New Zealand Parliament
Years	Term	Electorate	List	Party
2014–2017	51st	Hunua	55	National
2017–2020	52nd	Hunua	39	National
2020–2023	53rd	Port Waikato	17	National
2023	54th	List	15	National
2023–present	54th	Port Waikato		National

=== In Government, 2014–2017 ===
Bayly was elected to Parliament at the 2014 general election, as the National MP for Hunua with a majority of 17,376 votes. He replaced Paul Hutchison who retired. He had the fourth highest majority of all electorate seats in New Zealand. During the 51st New Zealand Parliament, Bayly served as a member of the Finance and Expenditure Committee and the Transport and Industrial Relations Committee, as deputy chair of the Regulations Review Committee, and as chair of the Local Government and Environment Committee.

In September 2016, Bayly proposed a private member's bill to Parliament that would give landlords more power to test and remedy their rental properties of dangerous levels of methamphetamine contamination. The bill would have placed an obligation on the landlord to provide rental accommodation free of methamphetamine contamination while giving them more power to confront the problem in their properties. While it was not selected for introduction, a similar bill was introduced by the National Government in 2017 and was later passed unanimously by Parliament under the Labour Government in 2019.

Bayly also successfully steered the Arbitration Amendment Bill through Parliament which passed through the House unanimously and which significantly enhanced arbitration proceedings and how they are conducted in New Zealand.

=== In Opposition, 2017–2023 ===
At the 2017 general election, Bayly retained Hunua by a margin of 19,443 votes. However, National did not win the election. Bayly held various party spokesperson roles under National's four leadership configurations that term. These included building regulation under Bill English; revenue, building and construction under Simon Bridges; revenue, commerce, and state-owned enterprises under Todd Muller and Judith Collins. He was also an associate finance spokesperson under the final three leaders. In the 2017–2020 term, Bayly continued as a member of the Finance and Expenditure Committee.

In September 2019, Bayly was ejected from Parliament for attempting to disrupt Parliamentary proceedings during his questioning of Housing Minister Megan Woods about the Ihumātao dispute.

For the 2020 general election, Bayly's electorate of Hunua was disestablished. A new electorate, Port Waikato, comprising part of the old Hunua electorate and part of the old Waikato electorate, was created. Bayly contested Port Waikato and was re-elected by a margin of 4,313 votes.

Bayly was regarded as a "close ally" to National leader Judith Collins. When she reshuffled her shadow cabinet on 11 November 2020 and promoted Bayly to third rank with the positions of shadow treasurer (senior to the finance spokesperson Michael Woodhouse) and National Party spokesperson for infrastructure and statistics. This was a promotion of 14 places in National's shadow cabinet, and Bayly was described by reporters as the "big winner" in the reshuffle, but also as "relatively unknown" and "little-known." Some media comment focussed on Bayly's title of shadow treasurer, despite there being no person in the Government with the role of Treasurer to shadow, although Collins suggested re-establishing that role if National were to win the next general election. Bayly was given responsibility for revenue policy, budget preparation and review, monetary policy, KiwiSaver and the New Zealand Superannuation Fund. However, Bayly was criticised for being "invisible" and ineffective.

On 10 November 2021, the New Zealand Superannuation and Retirement Income (Fair Residency) Amendment Bill was passed. This was a member's bill in Bayly’s name, although it had been introduced by former New Zealand First MP Mark Patterson in the previous term of Parliament. The bill changes the criteria for New Zealand superannuation so that older migrants, and New Zealanders who spent large portions of their lives overseas, must wait longer to qualify.

Following the appointment of Christopher Luxon as party leader on 30 November 2021 and a subsequent reshuffle of the shadow cabinet in early December, Bayly was demoted to 15th position and given responsibility for revenue, small business, commerce and consumer affairs, building and construction, and manufacturing.

=== In Government, 2023–2026 ===
Bayly contested Port Waikato in the October 2023 general election, but the electorate vote was postponed to a by-election in November after another candidate died. In the interim, Bayly was elected as a list MP. He won the by-election with a margin of 11,432 votes over New Zealand First candidate Casey Costello.

In the Sixth National Government, which formed during the by-election period, Bayly was appointed as a minister outside Cabinet with responsibility for commerce and consumer affairs, statistics, and small business and manufacturing.

In October 2024 Bayly apologised after telling a worker at an export business he had visited to "take some wine and fuck off", and calling him a "loser". The worker wrote a formal letter of complaint after the incident. Bayly described his behaviour at the visit as "unbecoming of a government minister", and denied being intoxicated.

Following a cabinet reshuffle on 19 January 2025, Bayly became the Minister responsible for the Accident Compensation Corporation (ACC). He continued as commerce minister, but lost responsibility for statistics and small business and manufacturing.

In February 2025, Bayly resigned as a Minister after an "animated discussion" where he placed his hand on a staff member's upper arm. He issued a public apology for his actions. Bayly's commerce and ACC portfolios were assumed by fellow National MP Scott Simpson. While Prime Minister Christopher Luxon defended the National Party's handling of the incident, Labour leader Chris Hipkins criticised Luxon's perceived slow response to an earlier bullying incident in 2024.

On 5 March 2025, Bayly was granted retention of the title The Honourable, in recognition of his term as a member of the Executive Council. On 10 March, Radio New Zealand reported that Bayly had taken two weeks' leave from Parliament to trek to Mount Everest's base camp in Nepal. A spokesperson for Luxon stated it was rare for National to grant personal leave while Parliament was sitting, with requests being considered on a case-by-case basis. Bayly returned to Parliament at the end of March and in April was appointed the chair of the Justice committee.

In October 2025, Bayly claimed he was misled about the allegations against him before he resigned as a cabinet minister. No formal complaint was ever made against Bayly, and no formal investigation was conducted by the Department of Internal Affairs (DIA). While the staff member he had touched in February 2025 had not filed a complaint, the DIA had said that three staff members at the meeting had corroborated the misconduct allegation against him. Based on this premise, Bayly had decided to resign. One of these staff members subsequently disputed the DIA's account of the incident.

In December 2025, Bayly hosted 22 parliamentarians and other representatives from 20 countries at the third Antarctic Parliamentarians Assembly in Wellington. Delegates heard from scientists and discussed current issues affecting Antarctica. Bayly will chair the steering committee for the next Parliamentarians Assembly, set for 2027.

In March 2026, Bayly announced he would not contest the Port Waikato electorate at the 2026 election, as he was moving to the South Island, and would instead explore a placement on the National Party list. On 20 June 2026, Bayly confirmed that he would not be seeking a place on the National list and would leave Parliament at the election.

During his valedictory speech in early September 2026, Bayly advocated several pension reforms including gradually raising the superannuation age to 68 years by 2065, increasing superannuation payments and allowing people with poorer health, shorter life expectancies and hazardous occupations to access their pensions earlier.

New Zealand Parliament
Preceded by Paul Hutchison	Member of Parliament for Hunua; 2014–2020	Constituency abolished
Vacant Constituency recreated after abolition in 2008 Title last held by Paul Hutchison	Member of Parliament for Port Waikato; 2020–present	Incumbent
Political offices
Preceded by Duncan Webb	Minister of Commerce and Consumer Affairs; 2023–2025	Succeeded by Scott Simpson
New office	Minister for Small Business and Manufacturing; 2023–2025	Succeeded by Chris Penk
Preceded by Deborah Russell	Minister of Statistics; 2023–2025	Succeeded by Shane Reti
