= Roger Douglas =

New Zealand politician

The Honourable Sir Roger Douglas
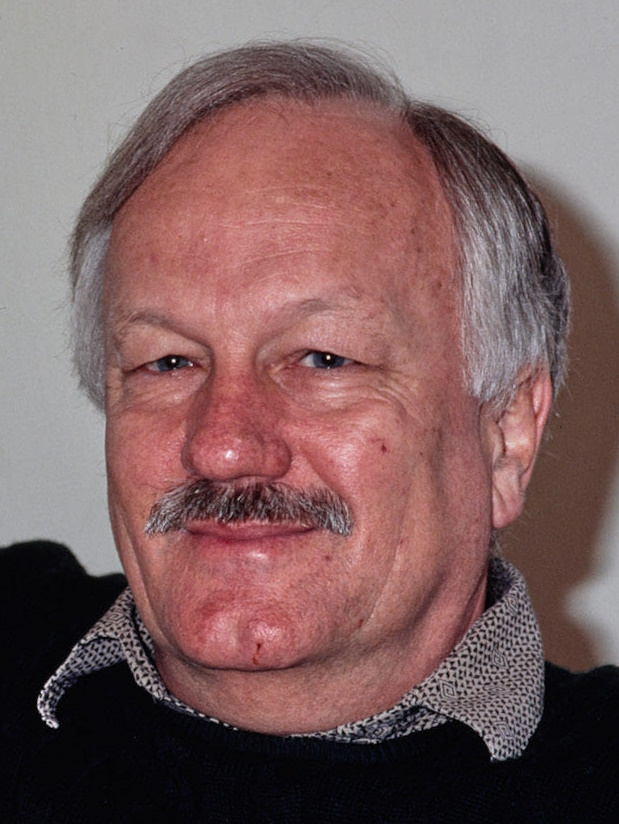
- Douglas as a cabinet minister

35th Minister of Finance
- In office 26 July 1984 – 14 December 1988
- Prime Minister: David Lange
- Preceded by: Robert Muldoon
- Succeeded by: David Caygill

17th Minister of Revenue
- In office 26 July 1984 – 24 August 1987
- Prime Minister: David Lange
- Preceded by: John Falloon
- Succeeded by: Trevor de Cleene

45th Minister of Customs
- In office 13 March 1975 – 12 December 1975
- Prime Minister: Bill Rowling
- Preceded by: Mick Connelly
- Succeeded by: Peter Wilkinson

10th Minister of Housing
- In office 10 September 1974 – 12 December 1975
- Prime Minister: Bill Rowling
- Preceded by: Bert Walker
- Succeeded by: Fraser Colman

12th Minister of Broadcasting
- In office 8 December 1972 – 12 December 1975
- Prime Minister: Norman Kirk; Bill Rowling
- Preceded by: Bert Walker
- Succeeded by: Hugh Templeton

42nd Postmaster-General
- In office 8 December 1972 – 10 September 1974
- Prime Minister: Norman Kirk
- Preceded by: Bert Walker
- Succeeded by: Fraser Colman

Member of the New Zealand Parliament for Manurewa
- In office 25 November 1978 – 27 October 1990
- Preceded by: Merv Wellington
- Succeeded by: George Hawkins

Member of the New Zealand Parliament for Manukau
- In office 29 November 1969 – 25 November 1978
- Preceded by: Colin Moyle

1st Leader of ACT New Zealand
- In office 1994 – 24 March 1996
- Succeeded by: Richard Prebble

Member of the New Zealand Parliament for ACT Party List
- In office 8 November 2008 – 26 November 2011

Personal details
- Born: 5 December 1937 (age 88) Auckland, New Zealand
- Party: ACT (1993–c. 2023); Labour (until 1990)
- Relations: Bill Anderton (grandfather); Norman Douglas (father); Malcolm Douglas (brother)
- Profession: Accountant

Sir Roger Owen Douglas (born 5 December 1937) is a retired New Zealand politician, economist and accountant who served as a minister in two Labour governments. He is most recognised for his key involvement in New Zealand's radical economic restructuring in the 1980s, when the Fourth Labour Government implemented the neoliberal policy that became known as "Rogernomics".

Douglas served as a Labour Member of Parliament from 1969 to 1990. During his time as Minister of Finance (1984 to 1988), the government floated the New Zealand dollar, introduced corporate practices to state services, sold off state assets, and removed a swathe of regulations and subsidies. Some Labour Party supporters regarded Douglas's economic policies as a betrayal of Labour's left-wing policy-platform, and the moves became deeply unpopular with the public and with ordinary party members. His supporters defended the reforms as necessary to revive the economy, which had been tightly regulated under National's Robert Muldoon (Minister of Finance from 1975 to 1984). As a result of his flat tax proposal, Douglas came into conflict with Prime Minister David Lange, and he eventually resigned as Finance Minister; when Douglas was re-elected to Cabinet in 1989, Lange himself resigned as Prime Minister, signalling the demise of the Labour government.

In 1993, Douglas and Derek Quigley founded the Association of Consumers and Taxpayers (the forerunner of the ACT New Zealand party) as a means to further his policy ideas. Douglas returned to Parliament as an ACT backbencher in 2008 before retiring in 2011.

== Early life and background ==
Douglas was born on 5 December 1937. His family had strong ties with the trade-union movement, and actively engaged in politics. His grandfather, William Theophilus "Bill" Anderton, (1891–1966), was a left-wing Methodist local preacher and small business owner in Birmingham, England, who migrated to New Zealand with his wife in 1921. Anderton served as MP for Eden from 1935–1946, then as MP for Auckland Central from 1946–1960. He was Minister of Internal Affairs in the 1957–1960 Second Labour Government, establishing the Arts Council.

Roger Douglas's father, Norman Vazey Douglas, (1910–1985), a former trade union secretary, served as MP for Auckland Central from 1960–1975, and as opposition spokesman for labour, education, and social security from 1967–1972. Roger's brother Malcolm Douglas was briefly Labour MP for Hunua 1978–1979. Douglas grew up in a state house in Ewenson Avenue, One Tree Hill, Auckland. He attended Ellerslie Primary School, excelling in arithmetic and sports. Douglas attended Auckland Grammar School between 1950 and 1955, where he was a prefect and an avid cricket and rugby player.

Douglas had a summer job at the Auckland accounting firm Mabee, Halstead and Kiddle, accepting a job there at the end of 1952. He gained a degree in accountancy from Auckland University College in 1957. Afterwards, he was hired by Bremworth Carpets in South Auckland as company secretary. He married Glenis June Anderson and moved to Māngere in 1961, becoming President of the Manukau Labour Electorate Committee. He began to run the Bremworth division individually after the company's sale to UEB in the mid-1960s. He also served as campaign manager for successful Labour candidate Colin Moyle in 1963.

== Political career ==
After some experience in local body politics as a member of the Manukau City Council between 1965 and 1969, where he had been instrumental in the plans to purchase the land where the Manukau City Centre now stands, Douglas began his career in national politics in 1969 when he won election to parliament as the Labour Member of Parliament for Manukau. He gave his maiden speech in the Address-in-Reply debate on 7 April 1970. He devoted the greater part of his speech to the case against foreign investment in the domestic economy. His case for external protection of the domestic economy and government involvement in investment was characteristic of the Labour Party of the time. Douglas became involved in the party's policies on industry and economics. He served as the MP for Manukau from 1969 to 1978, and then for Manurewa from 1978 to 1990.

=== Cabinet Minister (1972–1975) ===
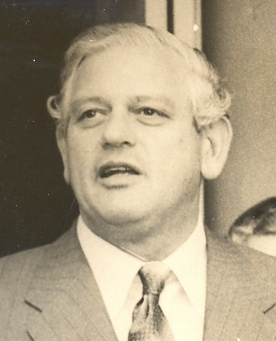
Labour Prime Minister Norman Kirk (pictured in 1972) appointed Douglas as Postmaster-General in his Cabinet; this was Douglas's first ministerial role.

Labour under Norman Kirk won the 1972 election, and the Labour parliamentary caucus elevated Douglas, then aged 34, to Cabinet rank. Thus, Douglas became the youngest Cabinet minister in 50 years. His father, and parliamentary colleague, Norman Douglas, then 62, failed to win a place in the ballot for Cabinet, and did not hide his bitter disappointment. On the day of the ballot, Kirk was so concerned by the extremity of Norman Douglas's reaction, and its effects on his son, that he called Douglas's mother to enlist her help. Kirk told his secretary, "It should have been the best day of Roger's life but instead it was the worst".

During the Third Labour Government, Douglas served as Postmaster-General and Minister of Broadcasting until the unexpected death of Kirk in 1974. Kirk's successor Bill Rowling appointed Douglas Minister of Housing. He remained Minister of Broadcasting until 1975, when the portfolio was disestablished. Douglas was Minister of Housing and Minister of Customs until Labour's defeat by the National Party under Robert Muldoon in the 1975 election. Douglas was the most junior member of Cabinet, but soon earned a reputation for hard work and competence. His appointment as Minister of Housing in 1974 marked him publicly as a talent in the Cabinet. It was a significant and, in political terms, a sensitive portfolio.

New Zealand Parliament
Years	Term	Electorate	List	Party
1969–1972	36th	Manukau		Labour
1972–1975	37th	Manukau		Labour
1975–1978	38th	Manukau		Labour
1978–1981	39th	Manurewa		Labour
1981–1984	40th	Manurewa		Labour
1984–1987	41st	Manurewa		Labour
1987–1990	42nd	Manurewa		Labour
2008–2011	49th	List	3	ACT

As Minister of Broadcasting, Douglas devised an administrative framework to allow for the introduction of a second television channel. It replaced the monopoly New Zealand Broadcasting Corporation with two competing publicly owned television channels, Television One, and Television Two (later called South Pacific Television) a corporation to manage public radio, Radio New Zealand, and a new Broadcasting Council. After public consultation, the scheme was implemented on 1 April 1975. However, the government of Muldoon merged the three broadcasters into a single Broadcasting Corporation of New Zealand in 1977, with the two television channels being merged into Television New Zealand in 1980.

Douglas was an early and enthusiastic promoter of the government's plans for a compulsory contributory superannuation scheme that would supplement the old age pension. In 1972, while still in opposition, he introduced a private member's bill that provided for a form of compulsory superannuation. In Cabinet, Rowling, who was then Minister of Finance, and Douglas were largely responsible for a 1973 White Paper setting out the government's proposals for superannuation. As well as augmenting individual provision for retirement, the scheme was intended to be a source of capital for investment in the domestic economy. The scheme became law in the form of the New Zealand Superannuation Act 1974.

Douglas was among the designers of the Dependent Minders' Allowance, which was part of Labour's platform in the 1975 election. Originally intended as a means of compensating women whose absence from the workforce reduced their superannuation contributions, the scheme offered a cash payment to women on the birth of their first and second children, or the first two children born after the election. It was immediately dubbed the "baby bonus" by Muldoon.

Margaret Hayward, who was Norman Kirk's private secretary, notes that during the Third Labour Government,

[Douglas] was the exact opposite of what he later became. He was one of the most interventionist and pro-state figures around: as a minister, he even wanted women to be given what became known as baby bonuses, effectively extra cash from the state for producing children, which all seems very Eastern bloc, looking back.

Conversely, Douglas did not attempt radical reform of his other ministerial responsibility, the Post Office, except for an attempt to make the Post Office 'market' two of its businesses – the Philatelic Bureau and the yellow pages. However, he had little opportunity to do anything else as he was elevated into the role of Minister of Housing after the death of Norman Kirk in 1974.

=== Opposition (1975–1984) ===
Douglas was critical of Labour's performance in government between 1972 and 1975. Labour's defeat in the 1975 election was the greatest electoral reversal since 1928. A Labour majority of 23 seats in a parliament of 87 members became a National majority of the same number. The Third Labour Government attempted to cushion economic contraction by borrowing abroad, but while it held unemployment to the level it had inherited, the rate of inflation trebled to an annual rate of 15 per cent and a surplus in the balance of payments became a deficit, exacerbated by the 1973 oil crisis. Labour lost credibility as an economic manager by 1975.

A series of scandals and misadventures, incompetence among some ministers, and Rowling's inability to counter Muldoon's populism contributed to the defeat. The nature of the defeat widened a division that already existed between the older and younger members of the Labour caucus.

In opposition after 1975, Douglas became successively Labour's spokesperson on housing, special projects, consumer affairs and transport. In 1980, he published a series of proposals for future economic development under the title an "Alternative Budget". The proposals were not Labour policy and their publication was seen by the party leader Rowling as a challenge to his authority. Rowling demoted Douglas from the parliamentary front bench and he lost his responsibility for transport. In 1981, he became spokesperson for trade and industry.

Douglas argued that the Labour Party's approach to economic policy was fragmented and based on unrealistic promises. He also believed that the party leadership should be revitalised, and supported David Lange's unsuccessful bid for the leadership in 1980. In informal Labour caucus politics, Douglas became a member of the so-called "Fish and Chip Brigade", which included Rowling's leading caucus opponents. He identified his closest colleagues as Richard Prebble, Mike Moore, and Michael Bassett.

The failure of Lange's leadership bid, continuing dissatisfaction with Labour's approach to economic policy, and his difficult relationship with leading figures in the party led Douglas to declare his intention to retire from Parliament at the 1981 general election. Lange was among those who persuaded him to reconsider. Lange believed that Douglas was a moderniser. He saw Douglas as sometimes obstinate and limited, but in Lange's view he had drive, and the ability to break from the traditions that had kept Labour so long in opposition. In March 1983, after Lange became leader of the Labour Party, he made Douglas the Labour spokesperson for finance.

At the time of his appointment, Douglas had a reputation as a radical but his thinking on economic issues remained within the boundaries of Labour's Keynesian approach to economic management. By the end of 1983, his thinking had shifted markedly to the economic right.

In late 1983, Labour's Caucus Economic Committee adopted a paper that Douglas named the economic policy package. The committee's support was not unanimous. The Douglas paper polarised opinion in the caucus. Several members of the caucus presented an alternative draft economic policy to the Labour Party's Policy Council.

The Policy Council was divided. Its members could not agree on the party's economic platform. When disagreement became increasingly a matter of public knowledge, and the 1984 general election drew closer, the party's deputy leader Geoffrey Palmer drafted a compromise proposal that combined elements of both sides of the argument. Lange doubted that Palmer's paper satisfied either side. When Muldoon unexpectedly called an early election, the Palmer document became part of Labour's election policy platform.

A critical element of Douglas's economic policy package, but not the Labour Party's policy document, was a 20 per cent devaluation of the New Zealand dollar. This was a sensitive subject. If it was widely known that an incoming government would devalue the dollar, dealers would seek profit by selling the dollar at its higher price before the election, and buying it back at its lower price afterwards. The difference, which might amount to hundreds of millions of dollars if there was a run on the currency, would be met by the taxpayer. Soon after Muldoon called the election, Douglas held a public meeting in his electorate and distributed copies of his economic policy package, which made the case for a 20 per cent devaluation. Muldoon obtained a copy and released it to the news media, intending to embarrass the Labour Party. Douglas acknowledged that devaluation was not part of Labour policy and accepted responsibility for the mistake. Although Lange believed that the error cast doubt on Douglas's judgement, he did not accept Douglas's resignation because he did not wish to appoint a new finance spokesperson so close to the election.

=== Minister of Finance (1984–1988) ===
Labour returned to power in the election of 1984 and formed the Fourth Labour Government. Lange became Prime Minister and Douglas became Minister of Finance. At Douglas's request, Lange appointed two senior ministers as associate finance ministers: David Caygill, who was also Minister of Trade and Industry, and Richard Prebble, who was also Minister of Transport. Douglas and his associate ministers became known as the "Treasury Troika" or simply the "Troika".

Soon after the election, the outgoing government carried out the devaluation that Douglas supported. The heads of Treasury and the Reserve Bank advised that devaluation was the only way to stop the currency crisis that followed the announcement of an early election.

The unsettled political climate around the early election and the currency crisis gave Douglas a powerful position in the Cabinet. Lange said in 1986 that the economic and political climate in 1984 gave Douglas influence he would not have had if the government had been elected in November 1984 and presented its first budget in June 1985. "When the crisis hit in July 1984, it was Roger Douglas who, above all, had thought through the economic issues – so when the Cabinet needed to fall back on an economic philosophy, it was Douglas who had one."

Labour promised during the election campaign to "open the books", largely as a challenge to Muldoon's supposedly secretive and ad hoc approach to economic management. Douglas responded by agreeing to the publication of Treasury's briefing to the incoming government, which appeared under the title Economic Management.

Douglas took a limited part in the Economic Summit Conference that began on 11 September 1984 because he was already at work on his first budget. He saw the summit as preparing the country to accept change, but noted the possibility that it might heighten expectations of continued consensus and involvement. He later stated that he had taken up the finance portfolio with a plan for economic restructuring already in mind, and described the budget he delivered in November 1984 as "an amalgam of what I had originally envisaged and fresh options presented in briefing papers and in debate with fellow ministers and Treasury officials."

Douglas's insistence that economic policy was the product of a plan conceived by him as early as 1980 and not a response to crisis left the government open to charges of bad faith.

The 1984 budget was a radical departure from Labour's established approach to economic management. Douglas answered criticism that the government's intentions had not been made clear to the electorate by saying that he had spelled out his whole programme to the Policy Council, which, he said, had understood and endorsed his intentions. He maintained that the detail was not made available to the public because it did not have the capacity to absorb it in the short time available.

The budget owed almost nothing to Labour's manifesto. Its content closely matched the Treasury view set out in Economic Management. Douglas's identification with Treasury was complete by 1985. Treasury initiatives adopted by the government that were not signalled before the 1984 election included the introduction of a comprehensive tax on consumption (GST), the floating of the dollar (which Douglas opposed until 1984) and the corporatisation of the government's trading activities, announced at the end of 1985.

Treasury's view of economic policy was neoclassical and monetarist, and used commercial criteria as the basis for decision-making. Douglas did not concede that his advocacy of these views placed him on the right of the political spectrum. He maintained that the government's social goals were the same as those of the First Labour Government and that changed circumstances required Labour to use different economic means to achieve its ends. He defended Treasury from the charge that its advice was at odds with Labour policy by arguing that its role was to give advice based on the interests of the nation as a whole. In his view, Treasury had no duty to help a government implement its manifesto because its responsibility was to advise its minister in a way that was free of party politics or ideology.

The coinage "Rogernomics" was used from at least 1985 onwards as shorthand for the Fourth Labour Government's economic reform policies. Douglas's public profile rose, and he built wide support for the government among the business community.

Douglas was reappointed to the finance portfolio after Labour's victory in the 1987 general election and remained finance minister until December 1988. His second term in office was marked by conflict with the prime minister Lange.

=== Lange and Douglas (1984–1989) ===
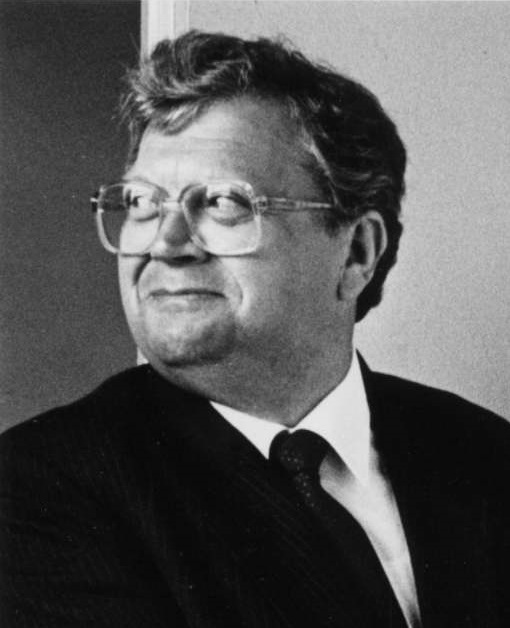
Labour leader David Lange (pictured) was an early supporter of Douglas's reforms, but became unsettled by the mounting social cost of Rogernomics.

The conflict between Lange and Douglas mirrored the inconsistency at the heart of the government. Lange's talk of consensus and inclusiveness during the 1984 general election campaign echoed Labour's social-democratic history. Douglas personified radical change.

Lange strongly supported the 1984 budget, and promoted it to party and public. Douglas and Lange were a formidable political combination, both in Cabinet and in public, where Lange's humour and rhetoric complemented the determination and single-mindedness embodied in Douglas's commitment to economic restructuring.

Lange valued Douglas's doggedness in the government's first term of office, when "urgency was needed and boldness was at a premium", but believed he was limited by an inability to accept or understand interests that were not in tune with his. In 1986, the two took opposing sides in Cabinet debates about the establishment of a royal commission on social policy, which Lange saw as an intellectual counterweight to Treasury. At the beginning of 1987, relations between the Douglas and Lange offices were strained when Douglas and his ally Richard Prebble persuaded Cabinet to reject Lange's wish to accept the resignation of the Minister of Māori Affairs, Koro Wētere, following the Māori loan affair.

Douglas shocked Lange in April 1987 by telling him that his preferred option for the 1987 budget included a rise in GST from a rate of 10% to 15%, the extension of user charges in public health and education and the sale of most government assets, and the eventual achievement of a flat rate of income tax at 15 per cent. Lange wrote that "it was an unaccustomed addition to the burdens of office to have the finance minister take leave of his senses". After discussions with Lange and senior colleagues, Douglas did not pursue his proposals.

In the 1987 election campaign, Douglas underlined the need for continuing radical reform, while Lange said that radical economic reform was largely complete. Douglas's appeal to commercial interests was reflected in the large amounts of money (including $250,000 given by Auckland businessman Alan Hawkins) he collected for the campaign from the business community. He did not convey the money he raised to the Labour Party organisation, but chose to manage it himself, allocating funds for purposes like television advertising.

Lange's campaign was lacklustre, and Douglas appeared to have contributed more to Labour's victory in 1987. Mike Moore, then a senior member of Cabinet, said that Lange had won the 1984 election, but Douglas won in 1987. Labour increased its parliamentary majority. Votes swung to Labour in National's safest seats and swung to National in seats that traditionally voted Labour.

Immediately after the election, Lange reshuffled the Cabinet without consulting Douglas. He wrote later that he no longer trusted Douglas and wished to use the reallocation of portfolios to put some restraints on him.

Douglas continued to work on the radical proposals he signalled earlier in 1987. A worldwide fall in share markets in October 1987 gave his work greater urgency. In December 1987, the Cabinet agreed, in spite of Lange's reservations, to a statement of principle that supported a flat rate of income tax and a new form of income assistance called guaranteed minimum family income (GMFI). GMFI was a Douglas initiative and for reasons of urgency he did not inform colleagues of Treasury advice that the proposals were a fiscal risk.

The announcement on 17 December 1987 of the government's intention to introduce GMFI and a flat rate of income tax marked the high tide of Rogernomics but did nothing to settle growing tension between Douglas and Lange. Douglas refused to accept Lange's contention that his proposals were unworkable. Douglas was in Europe in January 1988 when Lange told a press conference that officials had been unable to resolve the practical difficulties of the flat tax/GMFI proposals and that the government would have to reconsider them. Douglas, believing that he had the support of a majority of Cabinet, immediately returned from Europe, and the rift between prime minister and finance minister became a matter of public knowledge.

Although Cabinet abandoned GMFI and reached a compromise about tax scales, the government's standing did not recover from the division between Douglas and Lange, which worsened and became more open as the year went on. Lange believed that David Caygill was Douglas's only tenable successor as finance minister, but Caygill refused to serve if Lange sacked Douglas. In December 1988, Douglas wrote to Lange to tell him that he intended to tell the Labour caucus he could no longer serve in a government led by him. Lange construed this letter as a resignation and replaced Douglas with Caygill.

In August and September 1988, some Labour Party members founded the Backbone club, a ginger group within the party that support Douglas in his financial reforms. Douglas himself continued his campaign against Lange through public statements, the unauthorised release of cabinet papers and on 21 December 1988 an unsuccessful challenge against Lange's leadership in the Labour caucus. In June 1989 his supporters in caucus moved a motion of no-confidence in Lange, which Lange only narrowly won. On 3 August 1989, the Labour caucus voted to return Douglas to Cabinet. Lange, who saw the vote as a choice between him and Douglas, resigned his office almost immediately afterwards.

Lange insisted that policy differences were behind his disagreement with Douglas, telling a press conference following his resignation that "Now is the time for the principle to replace the personality". He was critical of Douglas's conduct: "But with Roger his resolution, and his particular absolutely relentless pursuit of what he conceived to be an agenda worth pursuing, overrode all considerations of loyalty and in the end all manifestations of friendship." Douglas did not accept that there were any philosophical differences at issue, and attributed other motives to Lange: "In my mind he created the division that in my mind was never there. We had separate roles. I understood what my role was. I felt he should have understood what his role was."

Lange's successor Geoffrey Palmer did not restore Douglas to the finance portfolio, then held by David Caygill, but appointed him Minister of Police and Minister of Immigration. Douglas did not stand for Parliament at the 1990 election, which Labour lost. His policies, however, continued under the aegis of Ruth Richardson, the Minister of Finance in the new Fourth National Government of New Zealand (in a style that became known as "Ruthanasia").

=== ACT New Zealand ===
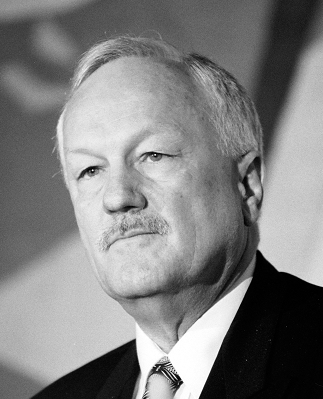
Douglas in 1996

In 1993, Douglas co-founded the Association of Consumers and Taxpayers with Derek Quigley. Douglas and Quigley intended the Association to serve as a pressure-group promoting the Douglas economic policies. Shortly afterwards, in 1996, the country switched to using the MMP electoral system. MMP gave smaller parties a much better chance of entering Parliament, and encouraged the Association to establish the ACT New Zealand Party. The nascent party's manifesto was based upon a book written by Douglas entitled Unfinished Business. Douglas served as ACT's first leader, but soon stood aside for Richard Prebble (his old ally from their days in the Labour caucus).

Douglas remained a strong supporter of ACT, although he became somewhat unhappy with the party's alleged lack of focus on pure economic policy. In particular, Douglas criticised what he saw as populism within the party, claiming that some of its MPs seemed more committed to grabbing headlines than to developing policy. When in April 2004 Prebble announced his decision to retire, Douglas spoke out in favour of Stephen Franks and Ken Shirley as possible successors – the other main contender in the leadership race, Rodney Hide, had a reputation for advocating the style that Douglas condemned. Hide won the leadership and headed ACT until his resignation in April 2011.

On 2 December 2004, both Douglas and Quigley announced that they would step down as patrons of ACT. They stated as the reason that they wished to have more freedom to disagree with the party publicly.

On 21 February 2008, Douglas renewed his involvement with ACT by signing a letter inviting supporters to the 2008 ACT conference, and appearing in television and newspaper interviews endorsing ACT for the 2008 general election. At ACT's 2008 annual conference in Auckland, Douglas announced his intention to stand for Parliament again, as an ACT candidate. The announcement that he would run in the newly created electorate of Hunua came on 8 June 2008. ACT assigned Douglas the number three slot on its party list.

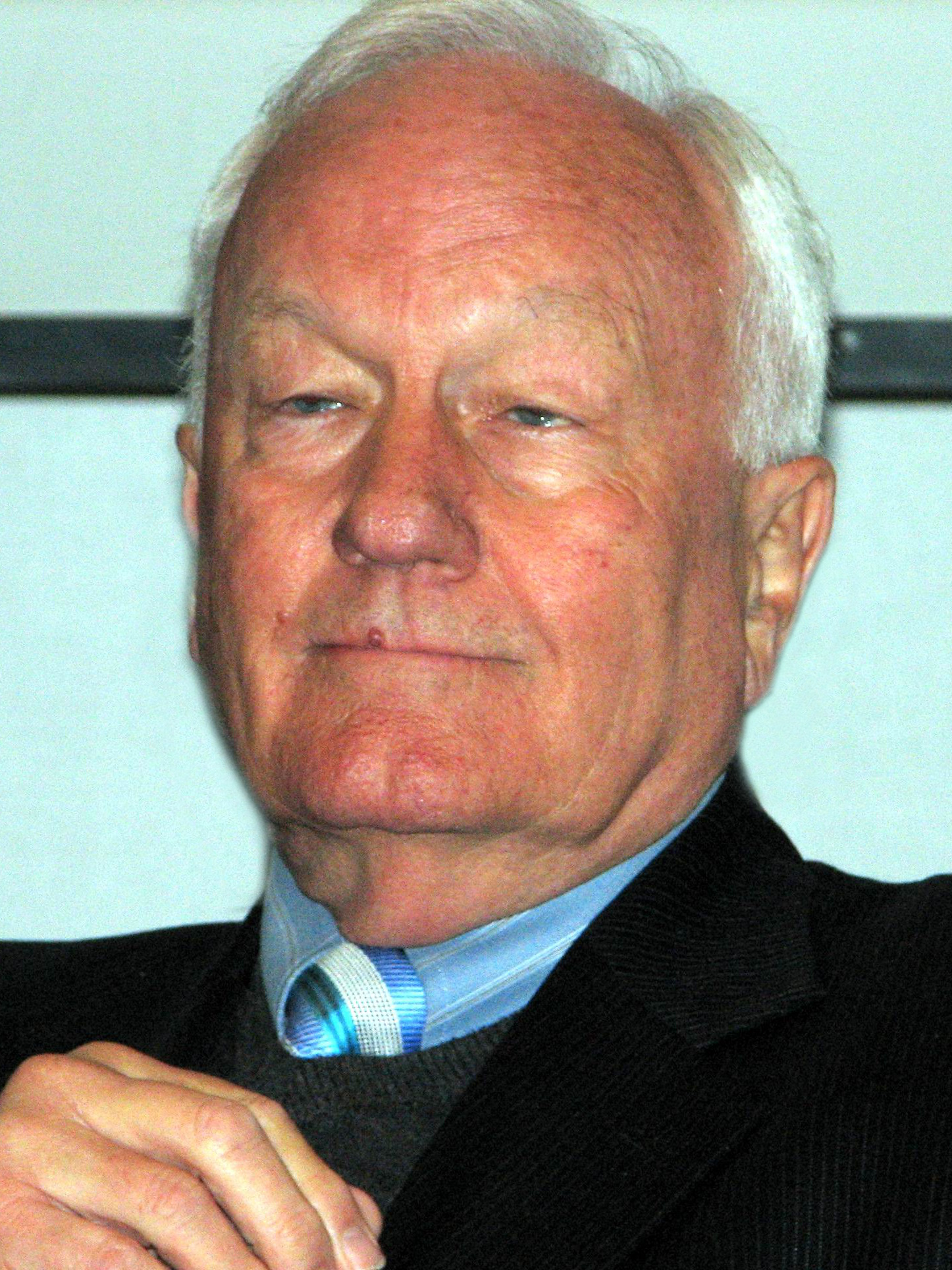
Douglas at Lincoln University, 2008

Douglas finished a distant third in Hunua, taking only 9.6 percent of the vote. However, ACT leader Rodney Hide was reelected as the member for Epsom, allowing ACT to enter Parliament under MMP. A party that falls below the five-percent threshold can still qualify for MMP if it wins at least one electorate seat. ACT's 3.65 percent of the party vote entitled it to five seats, allowing Douglas to re-enter Parliament as a list MP. ACT gave confidence and supply to National. Prime Minister-elect John Key had previously said that he would not give Douglas a Cabinet position, but Douglas indicated a wish for a review of this stance.

As a government backbencher, Douglas had three member's bills drawn from the ballot in 2010. The first, the Minimum Wage (Mitigation of Youth Unemployment) Amendment Bill, which would reintroduce a separate minimum wage for 16- and 17-year-olds was drawn from the member's ballot in February, and was defeated at its first reading 117–5. The second, the Tariff Act 1988 Repeal Bill, which would repeal all tariffs on goods imported into New Zealand, was drawn in April, and was also defeated at its first reading 116–5 The third, the Education (Board of Trustee Freedom) Amendment Bill, which would make school teachers' pay in all state and state integrated schools the responsibility of Boards of Trustees rather than the Ministry of Education was drawn in June, and was defeated on its first reading 111–10.

On 18 February 2011, Douglas announced that he would retire at the end of the 49th New Zealand Parliament. On 29 September, he delivered his valedictory speech in Parliament.

== Career outside politics ==
In early 1992, Douglas gave a schedule of speeches on economics in Russia, which was transitioning from a command economy to free-market capitalism, as part of a privatisation advisory committee organised by the World Bank. Later in 1992, Douglas was appointed to the inaugural board of the Auckland Warriors by the Auckland Rugby League. He later served as chairman before being replaced in 1996.

During his absence from national politics, Douglas held senior positions at a number of prominent companies, such as Ron Brierley's BIL, which he briefly served as Executive Chairman. He also served as the managing director of Roger Douglas Associates, an international consulting firm.

== Honours and awards ==
In 1977, Douglas was awarded the Queen Elizabeth II Silver Jubilee Medal, and in 1990 he received the New Zealand 1990 Commemoration Medal. In the 1991 New Year Honours, he was appointed a Knight Bachelor, for public services.

== Legacy ==
In 1997, in a back-handed compliment, the founders of the annual award for "The Worst Transnational Corporation operating in New Zealand", as voted by "four or five eminent judges – academics, community leaders, artists, even sportspeople", named it the "Roger Award" after Douglas.

Douglas and his policies were and remain controversial and polarising. His supporters contend that he was responsible for rejuvenating the New Zealand economy while his opponents argue that Rogernomics was responsible for a vast increase in inequality between rich and poor, among other things.

Helen Clark, a later Labour Prime Minister, denounced Rogernomics as "a ghastly period" and led Labour back into power by abandoning its legacy. However, political analysts suggest that she did not significantly alter the paradigm created by Rogernomics. By and large, governments since the 1980s have retained or reinforced the policies promoted by Douglas in the years 1984 to 1987, including low levels of import-protection, "credible" monetary and fiscal policies, deregulated financial markets and limited subsidies and other interventions in the economy.

== See also ==
- Politics of New Zealand
- Economy of New Zealand

== Notes ==
New Zealand Parliament
Preceded by Colin Moyle	Member of Parliament for Manukau; 1969–78	Electorate abolished
Preceded by Merv Wellington	Member of Parliament for Manurewa; 1978–90	Succeeded by George Hawkins
Political offices
Preceded by Bert Walker	Minister of Broadcasting; 1972–1975	Succeeded by Hugh Templeton
Preceded by Bert Walker	Postmaster-General; 1972–1974	Succeeded by Fraser Colman
Preceded by Bill Fraser	Minister of Housing; 1974–1975	Succeeded by George Gair
Preceded by Mick Connelly	Minister of Customs; 1975	Succeeded by Peter Wilkinson
Preceded by Robert Muldoon	Minister of Finance; 1984–88	Succeeded by David Caygill
Preceded by John Falloon	Minister of Revenue; 1984–87	Succeeded by Trevor de Cleene
Preceded by Peter Tapsell	Minister of Police; 1989–90	Succeeded by Richard Prebble
Preceded by Stan Rodger	Minister of Immigration; 1989–90	Succeeded by Annette King
Party political offices
New political party	Leader of ACT New Zealand; 1994–96	Succeeded by Richard Prebble
