= Puni, Afghanistan =

Coordinates: 34°17′24″N 64°22′48″E

Puni is a village in Ghōr Province, Afghanistan.

== See also ==
- Ghōr Province
