= Michelle Boag =

New Zealand businessman and politician

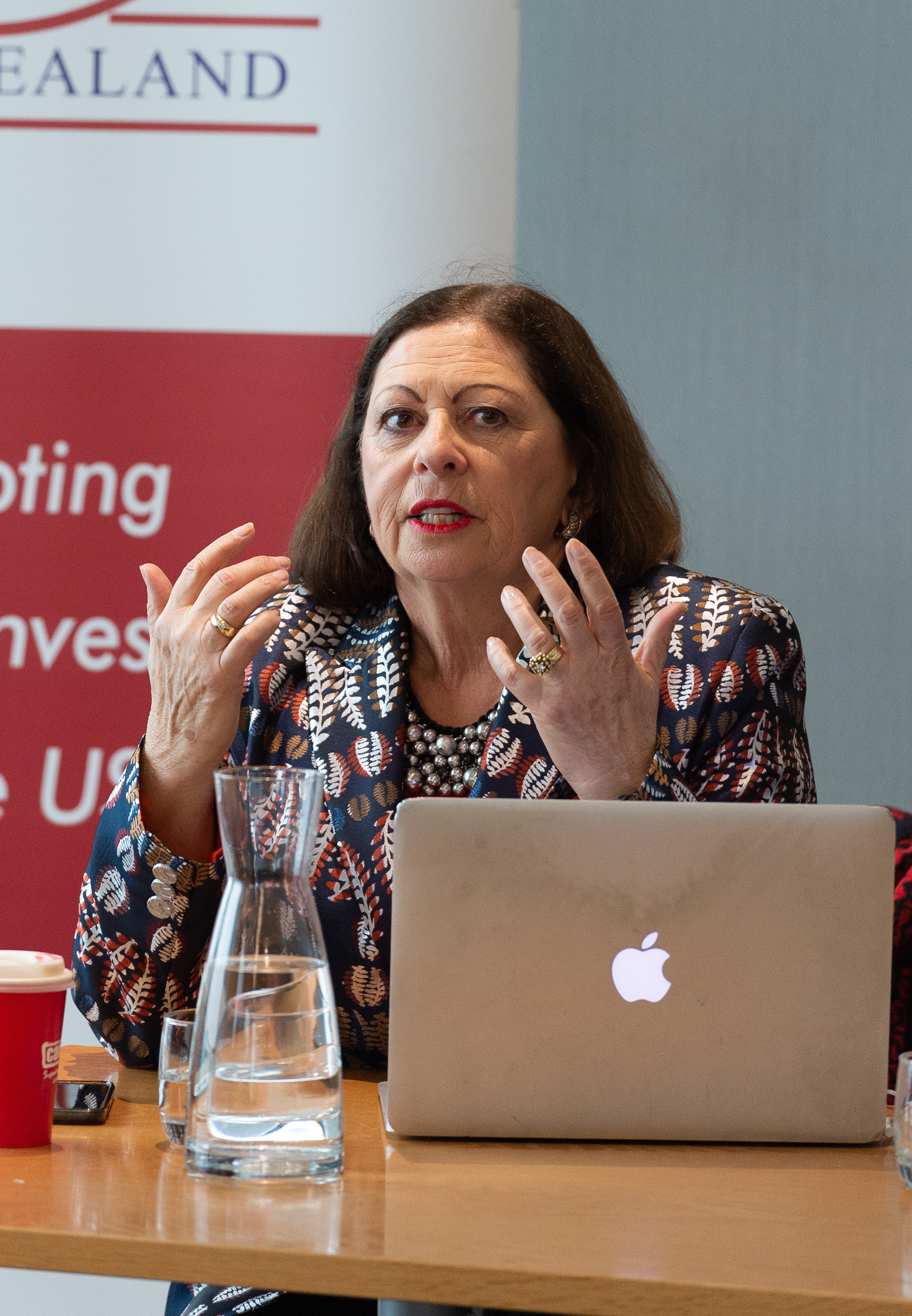

President of the National Party
- In office 2001–2002
- Succeeded by: Judy Kirk

Personal details
- Party: National
- Education: Victoria University of Wellington

Michelle Ann Boag (born 10 December 1954) is a New Zealand public relations practitioner and former National Party president.

== Biography ==
She was educated at Auckland Girls' Grammar School and graduated with a Bachelor of Arts in political science from Victoria University of Wellington in 1977.

Boag was a National Party activist, having joined the Junior National Party in Auckland in the early 1970s. She was in the Prime Minister's press office in 1976, joined the National Party research unit and in 1985 was press officer to the Leader of the Opposition. She spent a short time with the Liberal Party in Australia before moving to public relations work in Auckland and Wellington. While representing Fay Richwhite at the Winebox Inquiry she misled the inquiry and brought in a fake film crew to collect footage of MP Winston Peters.

Boag was a National Party Dominion councillor and on the Dominion Publicity Committee. In 2001 she became National Party president. In her time as president she rejuvenated the party, manipulating candidate selections to remove those she saw as "dead wood". This enabled Bill English to become leader of the National Party, for the first time. English would then go on to lead the National Party to its worst ever election result at the 2002 election.

In 2006 Boag, then chair of the Auckland Rescue Helicopter Foundation, used a rescue helicopter to fetch her passport from Waiheke Island and deliver it to her at Auckland International Airport.

== Leaks ==
Boag became embroiled in the 2012 Accident Compensation Corporation (ACC) privacy breach when it was revealed that she had acted as support person for ACC claimant Bronwyn Pullar.

On 7 July 2020, Boag admitted leaking sensitive medical information about COVID-19 patients passed to her in confidence in her role of acting chief executive of the Auckland Rescue Helicopter Trust. She gave the information to National MP Hamish Walker, who then provided it to media outlets. As a result she was forced to resign from the role. The following day, Boag resigned from roles she had on National Member of Parliament Nikki Kaye's electorate and campaign team. On 9 July she offered to resign from the board of the Simplicity Kiwisaver scheme. On 10 July she resigned her membership of the National Party after it was revealed that she had also passed the leaked information to Health spokesperson Michael Woodhouse.

Party political offices
Preceded by John Slater	President of the National Party; 2001–2002	Succeeded by Judy Kirk
