= Port Waikato (electorate) =

- Single-member general constituency for the New Zealand House of Representatives
- Interactive map of boundaries from the 2026 election
- Formation: 1996, 2020
- Region: Waikato
- Character: Rural
- Term: 3 years

Member for Port Waikato
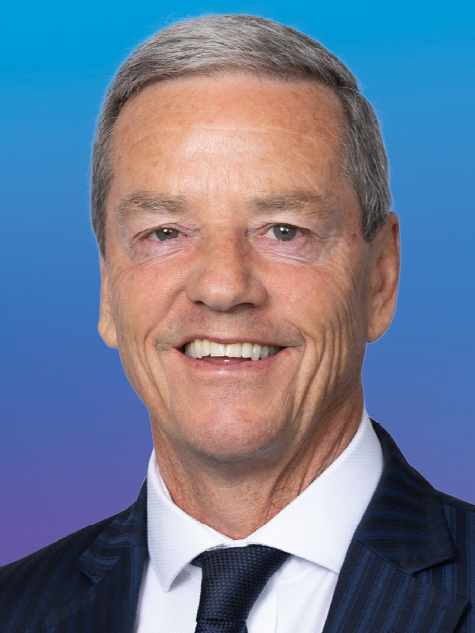
- Andrew Bayly since 25 November 2023
- Party: National
- List MPs: Casey Costello (NZ First)
- Previous MP: null
Party vote distribution

Port Waikato is a New Zealand parliamentary electorate which existed for four parliamentary terms from 1996 to 2008, and was recreated by the 2019/20 electoral redistribution ahead of the 2020 election. It was held by Bill Birch for one term, and by Paul Hutchison for the following three terms. From 2020, it was held by Andrew Bayly. All of these were members of the National Party.

During the campaign for the 2023 general election, the ACT Party candidate died. Only a poll for the party vote was held during this election; the electorate vote was determined in the 2023 Port Waikato by-election.

== Population centres ==
The 1996 election was notable for the significant change of electorate boundaries, based on the provisions of the Electoral Act 1993. Because of the introduction of the mixed-member proportional (MMP) electoral system, the number of electorates had to be reduced, leading to significant changes. More than half of the electorates contested in 1996 were newly constituted, and most of the remainder had seen significant boundary changes. In total, 73 electorates were abolished, 29 electorates were newly created (including Port Waikato), and 10 electorates were recreated, giving a net loss of 34 electorates.

The Port Waikato electorate was formed from parts of the Franklin, Raglan, and Waikato electorates, all of which were abolished. In its initial area, towns with more than one polling booth were Huntly, Pukekohe, Ngāruawāhia, Tuakau, and Waiuku. Localities with a single polling booth were Aka Aka, Awhitu, Bombay, Buckland, Glen Massey, Glen Murray, Glenbrook, Horotiu, Mauku, Meremere, Naike, Ohinewai, Onewhero, Orini, Otaua, Paerata, Pōkeno, Port Waikato, Pukekawa, Pukemiro, Pukeoware, Puni, Raglan, Rangiriri, Ruawaro, Taupiri, Te Ākau, Te Hoe, Te Kauwhata, Te Kohanga, Te Kowhai, Te Pahu, Te Uku, Waerenga, Waikaretu, Waikokowai, Waingaro, Waipipi, Waiterimu, Waitetuna, Whatawhata, and Whitikahu.

== History ==
Bill Birch was the first representative of the Port Waikato electorate following the 1996 election. Throughout his long parliamentary career, which started in 1972, Birch always represented the electorate in which the town of Pukekohe was located, where he had established a business prior to entering parliament. When Birch retired at the 1999 election, he was succeeded by Paul Hutchison, a medical specialist. When the Port Waikato electorate was abolished in 2008, Hutchison transferred to the reconstituted Hunua electorate, which he represented until his retirement from politics at the 2014 election.

Map of boundaries at the 2020 and 2023 general elections

In the 2019/2020 boundary review, the Representation Commission recreated it. This was necessitated by significant population growth in South Auckland and the Waikato region. It was created out of the western portion of Hunua and the northwestern area of Waikato. Of the nine creations at that redistribution, it was one of the four included in the initial proposals.

In 2023, Neil Christensen, who was a candidate for the ACT Party, died during the advance voting period. This triggered the Port Waikato by-election for the candidate vote, which will be held on 25 November 2023.

=== Members of Parliament ===
Key

National Labour

Election	Winner
1996 election	Bill Birch
1999 election	Paul Hutchison
2002 election	Paul Hutchison
2005 election	Paul Hutchison
(Electorate abolished 2008–2020; see Hunua)
2020 election	Andrew Bayly
2023 election	Cancelled due to death of a candidate
2023 by-election	Andrew Bayly

=== List MPs ===
Members of Parliament elected from party lists in elections where that person also unsuccessfully contested the Port Waikato electorate. Unless otherwise stated, all MPs terms began and ended at general elections.

Key

Election	Winner
2008	Louisa Wall^{1}
2023	Andrew Bayly^{2}
2023	Casey Costello

^{1}Wall was elected from the party list in March 2008 following the resignation of Ann Hartley.

^{2} Bayly was elected from the National's party list in the 2023 New Zealand general election after the cancellation of electorate vote in Port Waikato after the death of the ACT Party candidate. Bayly was elected as the seat's MP in the subsequent 2023 Port Waikato by-election.

== Election results ==
=== 2026 election ===
The next election will be held on 7 November 2026. Candidates for Port Waikato are listed at Candidates in the 2026 New Zealand general election by electorate § Port Waikato. Official results will be available after 27 November 2026.

=== 2023 by-election ===
The following table shows the preliminary results of the by-election.

2023 Port Waikato by-election
Notes: Blue background denotes the winner of the by-election. Pink background denotes a candidate elected from their party list prior to the by-election. Yellow background denotes the winner of the by-election, who was a list MP prior to the by-election. A ✓ or ✗ denotes status of any incumbent, win or lose respectively.
Party	Candidate	Votes	%	±%
National	✓ Andrew Bayly	14,296	76.33	+37.59
NZ First	Casey Costello	2,864	15.29	—
NewZeal	Alfred Ngaro	409	2.18	+1.74
Animal Justice	Anna Rippon	297	1.59	—
NZ Loyal	Kim Turner	237	1.27	—
DemocracyNZ	Scotty Bright	225	1.20	—
Women's Rights	Jill Ovens	188	1.00	—
Independent	Gordon Dickson	88	0.47	—
Vision NZ	Vijay Sudhamalla	48	0.26	—
Informal votes		76	0.41	-1.28
National hold	Majority	11,432	61.04	+50.36

=== 2023 election ===
The electorate vote was cancelled due to the death of ACT candidate Neil Christensen. Only the party vote is shown below, with candidates as originally nominated at the close of nominations.

2023 general election: Port Waikato
Notes:	Blue background denotes the winner of the electorate vote. Pink background denotes a candidate elected from their party list. Yellow background denotes an electorate win by a list member, or other incumbent. A ✓ or ✗ denotes status of any incumbent, win or lose respectively.						
Party	Candidate	Votes	%	±%	Party votes	%	±%
National	Andrew Bayly	—	—	—	21,277	49.88	+13.71
Labour	Gwendoline Keel	—	—	—	7,918	18.56	−21.56
ACT	Neil Christensen	—	—	—	5,107	11.97	+1.33
NZ First	Casey Costello	—	—	—	3,146	7.38	+4.46
Green	Karla Buchanan	—	—	—	2,486	5.83	+2.50
NZ Loyal	Kim Turner	—	—	—	552	1.29	—
Opportunities					508	1.19	+0.27
Te Pāti Māori					381	0.89	+0.57
DemocracyNZ	Scotty Bright	—	—	—	232	0.54	—
NewZeal					229	0.54	+0.21
Legalise Cannabis					177	0.41	+0.05
Freedoms NZ					150	0.35	+0.18
Animal Justice	Anna Rippon	—	—	—	94	0.22	—
New Conservative					66	0.15	−1.53
Women's Rights					29	0.07	—
Leighton Baker Party					25	0.06	—
New Nation					22	0.05	—
Vision NZ	Vijay Sudhamalla	—	—	—			
Informal votes		—			258		
Total valid votes		—			42,657		

=== 2020 election ===
2020 general election: Port Waikato
Notes:	Blue background denotes the winner of the electorate vote. Pink background denotes a candidate elected from their party list. Yellow background denotes an electorate win by a list member, or other incumbent. A ✓ or ✗ denotes status of any incumbent, win or lose respectively.						
Party	Candidate	Votes	%	±%	Party votes	%	±%
National	Andrew Bayly	15,635	38.74	—	14,756	36.17	—
Labour	Baljit Kaur	11,322	28.06	—	16,369	40.12	—
Heartland	Mark Ball	8,462	20.97	—	574	1.41	—
Green	Bill Wilson	1,342	3.32	—	1,357	3.33	—
ACT	Dave King	1,340	3.32	—	4,343	10.64	—
New Conservative	Steven Senn	529	1.31	—	684	1.68	—
Advance NZ	Jamie Macgregor	341	0.84	—	353	0.87	—
Independent	Ian James Cummings	285	0.71	—			
Outdoors	Lucille Rutherfurd	209	0.52	—	49	0.12	—
ONE	Ian Johnson	176	0.44	—	135	0.33	—
Independent	Nick Pak	40	0.10	—			
NZ First					1,190	2.92	—
Opportunities					374	0.92	—
Legalise Cannabis					147	0.36	—
Māori Party					130	0.32	—
Sustainable NZ					26	0.06	—
Vision NZ					22	0.05	—
TEA					17	0.04	—
Social Credit					7	0.02	—
Informal votes		675			269		
Total valid votes		40,356			40,802		
National win new seat	Majority	4,313	10.68				

=== 1999 election ===
Refer to Candidates in the 1999 New Zealand general election by electorate#Port Waikato for a list of candidates.

=== 1996 election ===
1996 general election: Port Waikato
Notes:	Blue background denotes the winner of the electorate vote. Pink background denotes a candidate elected from their party list. Yellow background denotes an electorate win by a list member, or other incumbent. A ✓ or ✗ denotes status of any incumbent, win or lose respectively.						
Party	Candidate	Votes	%	±%	Party votes	%	±%
National	Bill Birch	12,529	43.80		10,809	37.58	
NZ First	John Forbes	5,527	19.32		4,996	17.37	
Labour	Terry Hughes	4,888	17.09		6,354	22.09	
Alliance	Francis Petchey	2,922	10.22		2,452	8.52	
ACT	Marlene Lamb	804	2.81		1,796	6.24	
Christian Coalition	Rick Hayward	733	2.56		1,211	4.21	
United NZ	Diane Colson	720	2.52		319	1.11	
McGillicuddy Serious	David Sutcliffe	397	1.39		122	0.42	
Natural Law	Rhonda-Lisa Comins	84	0.29		27	0.09	
Legalise Cannabis					441	1.53	
Progressive Green					64	0.22	
Animals First					51	0.18	
Green Society					25	0.09	
Superannuitants & Youth					23	0.08	
Mana Māori					21	0.07	
Ethnic Minority Party					18	0.06	
Conservatives					17	0.06	
Libertarianz					10	0.03	
Advance New Zealand					8	0.03	
Asia Pacific United					1	0.00	
Te Tawharau					0	0.00	
Informal votes		266			105		
Total valid votes		28,604			28,765		
National win new seat	Majority	7,002	24.48				
