= Hunua (electorate) =

Hunua electorate boundaries used from the 2014 election until 2020

The Hunua electorate existed three times for the New Zealand House of Representatives beginning in 1978, based at the south end of the Auckland urban area, and named for the Hunua Ranges. It covered different geographical areas over those periods. The electorate was last represented by Andrew Bayly of the National Party before its dissolution in 2020.

== Population centres ==
The 1977 electoral redistribution was the most overtly political since the Representation Commission had been established through an amendment to the Representation Act in 1886, initiated by Muldoon's National Government. As part of the 1976 census, a large number of people failed to fill out an electoral re-registration card, and census staff had not been given the authority to insist on the card being completed. This had little practical effect for people on the general roll, but it transferred Māori to the general roll if the card was not handed in. Together with a northward shift of New Zealand's population, this resulted in five new electorates having to be created in the upper part of the North Island. The electoral redistribution was very disruptive, and 22 electorates were abolished, while 27 electorates were newly created (including Hunua) or re-established. These changes came into effect for the 1978 election.

Population centres of the original electorate included Cockle Bay in the north-west, East Tāmaki in the west, the settlement of Hunua itself, Mangatāwhiri in the south, and Kaiaua in the east. The electorate existed for two parliamentary periods until the 1983 electoral redistribution, when boundary changes forced its abolition ahead of the 1984 election. The north-west corner went to the newly established Otara electorate, and the remaining part was absorbed by the reconstituted Franklin electorate.

== History ==
The 1978 election was notable in that Labour candidate Malcolm Douglas held an election night majority of 301 votes. However, National candidate Winston Peters claimed irregularities in the vote, and in a 24 May 1979 ruling, a Court-ordered recount resulted in 500 votes being re-classed as informal, giving Peters a majority of 192. Peters was declared elected as of election night.

The electorate was re-created due to the 1996 change to mixed-member proportional (MMP) voting and the resulting reduction in the number of constituencies. The second historical Hunua electorate contained a selection of dormitory towns in south Auckland, of which Papakura was the largest. The Hunua electorate was abolished again in 2002 and replaced by Clevedon.

The electorate was established again for the 2008 election. The new Hunua electorate was based around the southern and eastern fringes of the Auckland region, and contained the Franklin District towns of Pukekohe, Waiuku, Bombay, as well as Clevedon, Whitford and Maraetai from eastern Manukau. The resurrected Hunua electorate officially replaced the redrawn and renamed electorate of Port Waikato.

Hunua was abolished again for the 2020 general election, with the eastern half being incorporated into Papakura, a small section around Ormiston and Mission Heights becoming part of the new Takanini electorate, and the western half being merged into a recreated Port Waikato.

=== Members of Parliament ===
Key

National Labour ACT

Election	Winner
1978 election	Malcolm Douglas
24 May 1979 (Note: The election of Malcolm Douglas was overturned by the Electoral Court on 24 May 1979)	Winston Peters
1981 election	Colin Moyle
Electorate abolished 1984–1996; see Otara and Franklin
1996 election	Warren Kyd
1999 election	Warren Kyd
Electorate abolished 2002–2008; see Clevedon and Port Waikato
2008 election	Paul Hutchison
2011 election	Paul Hutchison
2014 election	Andrew Bayly
2017 election	Andrew Bayly
Electorate abolished in 2020; see Papakura and Port Waikato

=== List MPs ===
Members of Parliament elected from party lists in elections where that person also unsuccessfully contested the Hunua electorate. Unless otherwise stated, all MPs terms began and ended at general elections.

Election	Winner
2008 election	Roger Douglas

== Election results ==
=== 2017 election ===
2017 general election: Hunua
Notes:	Blue background denotes the winner of the electorate vote. Pink background denotes a candidate elected from their party list. Yellow background denotes an electorate win by a list member, or other incumbent. A ✓ or ✗ denotes status of any incumbent, win or lose respectively.						
Party	Candidate	Votes	%	±%	Party votes	%	±%
National	✓ Andrew Bayly	26,825	65.91	−0.96	26,005	62.81	−0.89
Labour	Baljit Kaur	7,382	18.14	+0.46	9,199	22.22	+9.16
NZ First	Jon Reeves	3,077	7.56	−0.65	3,541	8.55	−1.00
Green	Phil McCabe	2,002	—	+4.75	1,237	2.99	−2.78
Independent	Ian Cummings	710	1.74	—			
ACT	Anthony Smith	274	0.67	−0.53	297	0.72	−0.15
Opportunities					611	1.48	—
Māori Party					103	0.25	−0.15
Legalise Cannabis					102	0.24	−0.14
Conservative					76	0.18	−4.84
United Future					35	0.08	−0.19
Ban 1080					33	0.08	−0.17
Outdoors					27	0.07	—
People's Party					24	0.06	—
Mana Party					8	0.02	—
Internet					7	0.02	—
Democrats					5	0.01	−0.04
Informal votes		427			91		
Total valid votes		40,697			41,401		
National hold	Majority	19,443	47.77	−1.42			

=== 2014 election ===
2014 general election: Hunua
Notes:	Blue background denotes the winner of the electorate vote. Pink background denotes a candidate elected from their party list. Yellow background denotes an electorate win by a list member, or other incumbent. A ✓ or ✗ denotes status of any incumbent, win or lose respectively.						
Party	Candidate	Votes	%	±%	Party votes	%	±%
National	Andrew Bayly	23,621	66.87	+1.28	22,929	63.70	+1.12
Labour	Arena Williams	6,245	17.68	+0.92	4,699	13.06	−3.05
NZ First	Jon Reeves	2,900	8.21	+4.13	3,437	9.55	+2.13
Conservative	Neville Hudson	1,433	4.06	+0.07	1,807	5.02	+1.29
ACT	Ian Cummings	425	1.20	−0.08	313	0.87	−0.58
Māori Party	Thomas T. T. Phillips	244	0.69	+0.13	144	0.40	−0.13
Democrats	Huia Mitchell	96	0.27	+0.03	19	0.05	−0.03
Green					2,076	5.77	−1.11
Internet Mana					166	0.46	+0.25 (Note: 2014 Internet Mana swing is relative to the votes for Mana in 2011; it shared a party list with Internet in the 2014 election.)
Legalise Cannabis					136	0.38	−0.05
United Future New Zealand					82	0.23	−0.25
Ban 1080					46	0.13	+0.13
Civilian					14	0.04	+0.04
Independent Coalition					4	0.01	+0.01
Focus					4	0.01	+0.01
Informal votes		360			117		
Total valid votes		35,324			35,993		
Turnout		36,110	80.61	+5.18			
National hold	Majority	17,376	49.19	+0.36			

=== 2011 election ===
2011 general election: Hunua
Notes:	Blue background denotes the winner of the electorate vote. Pink background denotes a candidate elected from their party list. Yellow background denotes an electorate win by a list member, or other incumbent. A ✓ or ✗ denotes status of any incumbent, win or lose respectively.						
Party	Candidate	Votes	%	±%	Party votes	%	±%
National	✓ Paul Hutchison	22,563	65.59	+1.18	22,161	62.58	+1.94
Labour	Richard Hills	5,766	16.76	-1.05	5,705	16.11	-3.60
Green	Charmaine A. Watts	2,576	7.49	+3.01	2,438	6.88	+3.52
NZ First	Doug Nabbs	1,405	4.08	+1.15	2,626	7.42	+3.04
Conservative	Kevin Campbell	1,373	3.99	+3.99	1,320	3.73	+3.73
ACT	Ian Cummings	440	1.28	-7.74	515	1.45	-6.79
Māori Party	Thomas Tuatu Toihau Phillips	194	0.56	+0.56	188	0.53	-0.01
Democrats	Huia Mitchell	81	0.24	+0.24	30	0.08	+0.06
United Future New Zealand					170	0.48	-0.34
Legalise Cannabis					154	0.43	+0.11
Mana					75	0.21	+0.21
Libertarianz					25	0.07	+0.04
Alliance					4	0.01	-0.03
Informal votes		699			204		
Total valid votes		34,398			35,411		
National hold	Majority	16,797	48.83	+2.23			

Electorate (as at 26 November 2011): 47,215

=== 2008 election ===
2008 general election: Hunua
Notes:	Blue background denotes the winner of the electorate vote. Pink background denotes a candidate elected from their party list. Yellow background denotes an electorate win by a list member, or other incumbent. A ✓ or ✗ denotes status of any incumbent, win or lose respectively.						
Party	Candidate	Votes	%	±%	Party votes	%	±%
National	✓ Paul Hutchison	21,920	64.41		21,032	60.64	
Labour	Jordan Carter	6,062	17.81		6,836	19.71	
ACT	Roger Douglas	3,068	9.02		2,859	8.24	
Green	Fiona Kenworthy (Shaw)	1,525	4.48		1,168	3.37	
NZ First	Helen Mulford	997	2.93		1,516	4.37	
Kiwi	Frank Naea	209	0.61		130	0.37	
United Future New Zealand	Toni Driller	195	0.57		286	0.82	
Libertarianz	Bruce Whitehead	56	0.16		10	0.03	
Bill and Ben					199	0.57	
Progressive					194	0.56	
Māori Party					189	0.54	
Legalise Cannabis					112	0.32	
Family Party					95	0.27	
Pacific					21	0.06	
Alliance					16	0.05	
Workers Party					9	0.03	
Democrats					7	0.02	
RONZ					3	0.01	
RAM					2	0.01	
Informal votes		299			118		
Total valid votes		34,032			34,684		
National win new seat	Majority	15,858					

=== 1999 election ===
1999 general election: Hunua
Notes:	Blue background denotes the winner of the electorate vote. Pink background denotes a candidate elected from their party list. Yellow background denotes an electorate win by a list member, or other incumbent. A ✓ or ✗ denotes status of any incumbent, win or lose respectively.						
Party	Candidate	Votes	%	±%	Party votes	%	±%
National	✓ Warren Kyd	15,072	48.07	+9.14	12,118	38.23	-3.71
Labour	Paul Schofield	9,877	31.50	+15.06	9,430	29.75	+8.45
Alliance	Janice Graham	1,878	5.99		1,778	5.61	-0.68
ACT	John Thompson	1,713	5.46		3,543	11.18	+4.14
NZ First	John Geary	1,479	4.72		1,561	4.93	-8.81
Christian Heritage	Ken Andrew	784	2.50		780	2.46	
Christian Democrats	Bill Henderson	383	1.22		266	0.84	
Natural Law	Raylene Lodge	170	0.54		41	0.13	+0.04
Green					1,363	4.30	
Legalise Cannabis					340	1.07	-0.53
United NZ					183	0.58	-2.03
Libertarianz					96	0.30	+0.25
McGillicuddy Serious					56	0.18	-0.10
Animals First					54	0.17	-0.05
One NZ					25	0.08	
NMP					21	0.07	
Mana Māori					14	0.04	+0.02
Mauri Pacific					11	0.03	
Republican					7	0.02	
Freedom Movement					3	0.01	
South Island					2	0.01	
The People's Choice					2	0.01	
Informal votes		606			268		
Total valid votes		31,356			31,694		
National hold	Majority	5,195	16.57	-0.03			

=== 1996 election ===
1996 general election: Hunua
Notes:	Blue background denotes the winner of the electorate vote. Pink background denotes a candidate elected from their party list. Yellow background denotes an electorate win by a list member, or other incumbent. A ✓ or ✗ denotes status of any incumbent, win or lose respectively.						
Party	Candidate	Votes	%	±%	Party votes	%	±%
National	Warren Kyd	11,953	38.93		12,932	41.94	
United NZ	John Robertson	6,855	22.33		805	2.61	
Labour	Paul Schofield	5,049	16.44		6,569	21.30	
NZ First	Patra de Coudray	3,267	10.64		4,237	13.74	
Alliance	Huia Mitchell	1,682	5.48		1,938	6.29	
Christian Coalition	Enosa Auva'a	1,017	3.31		1,328	4.31	
ACT	Simon Harding	739	2.41		2,170	7.04	
Natural Law	Raylene Lodge	103	0.34		27	0.09	
Republican	Sophie James	40	0.13				
Legalise Cannabis					492	1.60	
McGillicuddy Serious					86	0.28	
Progressive Green					83	0.27	
Animals First					69	0.22	
Ethnic Minority Party					31	0.10	
Green Society					18	0.06	
Superannuitants & Youth					15	0.05	
Libertarianz					15	0.05	
Advance New Zealand					7	0.02	
Mana Māori					6	0.02	
Conservatives					3	0.01	
Asia Pacific United					2	0.01	
Te Tawharau					1	0.00	
Informal votes		225			96		
Total valid votes		30,705			30,834		
National win new seat	Majority	5,098	16.60				

=== 1981 election ===
1981 general election: Hunua
Party	Candidate	Votes	%	±%
Labour	Colin Moyle	9,343	43.85	
National	Winston Peters	8,347	39.17	−3.88
Social Credit	Geoff Morell	3,519	16.51	+3.06
Independent National	Ian Sampson	96	0.45	
Majority		996	4.67	
Turnout		21,305	90.01	
Registered electors		23,669		

=== 1978 election ===
1978 general election: Hunua
Party	Candidate	Votes	%	±%
National	Winston Peters	7,507	43.05	
Labour	Malcolm Douglas	7,315	41.95	
Social Credit	Geoff Morell	2,346	13.45	
Values	Peter Bruce Robinson	268	1.53	
Majority		192	1.10	
Turnout		17,436	N/A	
Registered electors		N/A		

Initial result

1978 general election: Hunua
Party	Candidate	Votes	%	±%
Labour	Malcolm Douglas	7,935	43.46	
National	Winston Peters	7,634	41.82	
Social Credit	Geoff Morell	2,410	13.20	
Values	Peter Bruce Robinson	275	1.50	
Informal votes		213	1.16	
Majority		301	1.64	
Turnout		18,254	N/A	
Registered electors		N/A		
