= Abortion Legislation Act 2020 =

Act of Parliament in New Zealand

New Zealand Parliament
- Royal assent: 23 March 2020
- Commenced: 24 March 2020

Legislative history
- Introduced by: Andrew Little
- First reading: 8 August 2019
- Second reading: 3 March 2020
- Third reading: 18 March 2020

Related legislation
- Crimes Act 1961; Contraception, Sterilisation, and Abortion Act 1977
- Status: Current legislation

The Abortion Legislation Act 2020 is a statute of the New Zealand Parliament that allows unrestricted access to abortion within the first 20 weeks of pregnancy, and repeals sections of the Crimes Act 1961 related to unlawful abortion. After the 20-week period, women seeking an abortion must consult a qualified health practitioner who will assess their physical health, mental health, and well-being. The Act also provides provisions for conscientious objection rights for medical practitioners, and exempts abortion services from certain Crimes Act provisions, while extending the definition of health services to include abortion services under the Health and Disability Commissioner Act 1994.

Elective abortion care had been available for several decades in New Zealand before this Act was passed, but women had to maintain a fiction that they were suffering from mental illness in order to get an abortion.

Throughout its passage through Parliament, the Act was treated as a conscience issue. It had varying levels of support at its various stages, and passed into law with a majority of 68–51 votes in its favour at the third reading, The Labour Party, National Party, and New Zealand First were split, with MPs voting both for and against. Only the Green and ACT parties, and independent MP Jami-Lee Ross voted in favour of the legislation at all three stages.

== Legislative features ==
The Abortion Legislation Act decriminalises abortion, aligns the regulation of abortion services with other health services, and modernises the legal framework of abortion provided by the Crimes Act 1961 and the Contraception, Sterilisation, and Abortion Act 1977 (CSA Act 1977). The Abortion Legislation Act repeals Sections 10 to 46 of the CSA Act 1977, including the Abortion Supervisory Committee (Section 10), the requirement that abortions need to be certified by two certifying consultants (Section 29), and the ban on women unlawfully procuring a miscarriage (Section 44). Under the Abortion Legislation Act, women can seek an abortion without restrictions within the first 20 weeks of their pregnancy. After the 20-week period, women seeking an abortion must consult a qualified health practitioner who will assess the patient's physical health, mental health, and well-being.

The Act also requires medical practitioners who have a conscientious objection to performing abortions to inform their patients at the earliest opportunity, and to provide them with information on how to access the closest abortion services. The Act also contains provisions for protecting the rights of conscientious-objecting medical professionals from discrimination and termination.

The Abortion Legislation Act also amends section 182 of the Crimes Act (killing an unborn child) to exempt abortion services within the provisions of the CSA Act. The Act also repeals Sections 183 to 187A of the Crimes Act, including the 14-year prison term for any persons, with the exception of the woman or girl seeking to unlawfully procure abortion (section 183); a seven-year prison term for persons who unlawfully provide the means of procuring an abortion (section 186), and seeking an abortion illegally before, or after, the 20-week gestation period (section 187). The Abortion Legislation Act replaces these sections with section 183 (clause 12), which makes it an offense for a person who is not a health practitioner to procure, or perform, an abortion for a woman.

The Abortion Legislation Act also extends the definition of health services in the Health and Disability Commissioner Act 1994 (HDC Act) to include abortion services.

== History ==
=== Existing law ===
Before the Abortion Legislation Act 2020, abortion was only decriminalised in New Zealand on certain grounds: to preserve the life of the woman (even if after 20 weeks), to preserve the physical health of the woman, to preserve the mental health of the woman, foetal impairment, and in cases of incest. The abortion also had to be authorised by two certifying consultants.

In practice, the law was interpreted liberally, and the system in effect operated as elective abortion, with one in four women in New Zealand having had an abortion in her lifetime. Almost all women had their abortion approved under the mental health ground. Politician David Seymour called the law a "charade" and commented "nobody believes that 97 per cent of women who have abortions are mentally ill"; while journalist Mark Sainsbury commented "the patients, the doctors, the politicians, just to play their part and, nod nod wink wink, it gets done".

=== Background ===
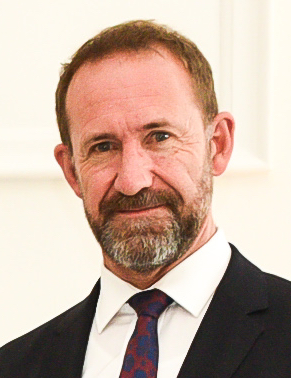
Andrew Little, the sponsor of the Abortion Legislation Act

On 5 August 2019, the Minister of Justice Andrew Little announced that the Labour-led coalition government would be introducing new legislation to decriminalise abortion, and to allow women unrestricted access to abortion within the 20-week gestation period. The New Zealand Law Commission had proposed three options for abortion reform: having no statutory test, to make sure the abortion was appropriate at any point; taking abortion off the Crimes Act, but having a statutory test; or only having a test for later-term abortions, after 22 weeks. The Government adopted the third approach, but reduced it to 20 weeks. While abortion-rights groups like the Abortion Law Reform Association of New Zealand (ALRANZ) and Family Planning have welcomed the proposed changes but criticized the 20 week limit, the Government's proposed abortion law reform was opposed by the conservative lobby group Family First New Zealand.

According to media reports, the ruling Labour Party and its coalition partner New Zealand First conducted months of negotiations on the proposed Abortion Legislation Bill. New Zealand First Member of Parliament and Minister of Children Tracey Martin, a supporter of abortion reform, played an active role in the negotiations. On 6 August 2019, NZ First leader and Deputy Prime Minister Winston Peters surprised both Martin and Labour by demanding a binding referendum on the Abortion Legislation Bill. The NZ First parliamentary caucus voted by a majority to support their leader's calls for a referendum. In response, Justice Minister Andrew Little ruled out support for a binding referendum on abortion, claiming that it had not been discussed during the negotiations. NZ First subsequently confirmed that it would support the Abortion Legislation Bill through its first and second readings while pushing for a referendum.

The opposition National Party leader Simon Bridges voiced his support for abortion reform but stated that more safeguards were needed. Voting for the Abortion Legislation Bill was conducted by a conscience vote, allowing MPs to vote individually on the bill. Opposition National MP Amy Adams criticized NZ First's call for a referendum, saying that the matter should be decided by Parliament.

=== First reading ===
On 8 August 2019, the New Zealand Parliament debated the Abortion Legislation Act for the first time. Several MPs commented that it is wrong that women had to lie to their doctors about their mental health in order to get an abortion under the existing law.

The bill passed by 94 votes against 23. It was then referred to the select committee stage. Three National Party MPs were absent from the vote: Alfred Ngaro was overseas but had sent a proxy vote against the bill that was not cast; Hamish Walker had voted for the Bill but his vote was discounted under Parliament's rules because he had left the Debating Chamber before the votes were counted; and Jian Yang who had missed the vote, having intended to vote in favour.

Voting at first reading (8 Aug 2019)
Party	Voted for	Voted against	Absent
National (55)	33: Amy Adams; Paula Bennett; Maggie Barry; Andrew Bayly; David Bennett; Dan Bidois; Chris Bishop; Simon Bridges; David Carter; Judith Collins; Matt Doocey; Sarah Dowie; Andrew Falloon; Paul Goldsmith; Nathan Guy; Brett Hudson; Nikki Kaye; Matt King; Barbara Kuriger; Denise Lee; Todd McClay; Ian McKelvie; Mark Mitchell; Todd Muller; Alastair Scott; Scott Simpson; Stuart Smith; Erica Stanford; Anne Tolley; Tim van de Molen; Nicky Wagner; Nicola Willis; Lawrence Yule	19: Kanwaljit Singh Bakshi; Simeon Brown; Gerry Brownlee; Jacqui Dean; Paulo Garcia; Jo Hayes; Harete Hipango; Melissa Lee; Agnes Loheni; Tim Macindoe; Simon O'Connor; Parmjeet Parmar; Chris Penk; Maureen Pugh; Shane Reti; Nick Smith; Louise Upston; Michael Woodhouse; Jonathan Young	3: Alfred Ngaro; Hamish Walker; Jian Yang
Labour (46)	42: Kiri Allan; Ginny Andersen; Jacinda Ardern; David Clark; Tāmati Coffey; Liz Craig; Clare Curran; Kelvin Davis; Ruth Dyson; Paul Eagle; Kris Faafoi; Peeni Henare; Chris Hipkins; Raymond Huo; Willie Jackson; Iain Lees-Galloway; Andrew Little; Marja Lubeck; Jo Luxton; Nanaia Mahuta; Trevor Mallard; Kieran McAnulty; Stuart Nash; Damien O'Connor; Greg O'Connor; David Parker; Willow-Jean Prime; Priyanca Radhakrishnan; Grant Robertson; Deborah Russell; Carmel Sepuloni; William Sio; Jamie Strange; Jan Tinetti; Phil Twyford; Louisa Wall; Angie Warren-Clark; Duncan Webb; Meka Whaitiri; Poto Williams; Michael Wood; Megan Woods	4: Anahila Kanongata'a-Suisuiki; Adrian Rurawhe; Jenny Salesa; Rino Tirikatene	–
NZ First (9)	9: Darroch Ball; Shane Jones; Jenny Marcroft; Ron Mark; Tracey Martin; Clayton Mitchell; Mark Patterson; Winston Peters; Fletcher Tabuteau	–	–
Green (8)	8: Marama Davidson; Julie Anne Genter; Golriz Ghahraman; Gareth Hughes; Jan Logie; Eugenie Sage; James Shaw; Chlöe Swarbrick	–	–
ACT (1)	1: David Seymour	–	–
Independent (1)	1: Jami-Lee Ross	–	–
Totals	94	23	3

=== Select committee stage ===
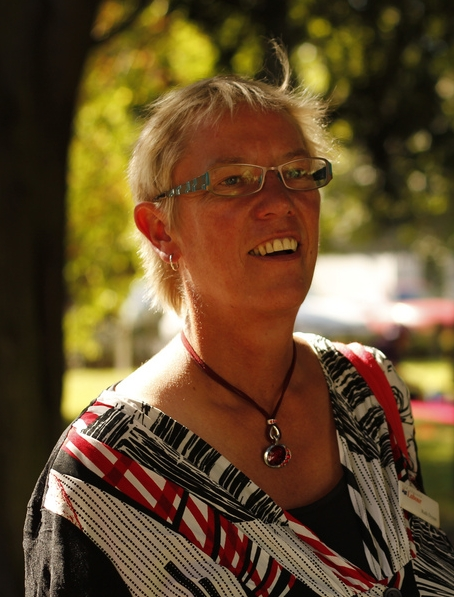
Ruth Dyson, Chairperson of the Abortion Legislation Committee

Submissions for the Abortion Legislation Bill were held until 19 September 2019. Labour MP Ruth Dyson was designated Chairperson of the Abortion Legislation Committee. Other Committee members have included Green MP Jan Logie, Labour MPs Priyanca Radhakrishnan and Anahila Kanongata'a-Suisuiki, and National MPs Nikki Kaye and Agnes Loheni. By 9 October 2019, the Abortion Legislation Committee had received 25,000 written submissions from a range of legal and medical experts, religious groups, national organisations and ordinary people sharing personal experiences including Dr Alison Knowles, the Mental Health Foundation, and Family First. Due to the large volume, the Committee confirmed that it would be hearing 150 oral submissions out of the 2,890 who had opted to speak. Family First national director Bob McCoskrie criticized the select committee for excluding certain voices and rushing the process. In response, Dyson reiterated the committee's commitment to hearing a range of perspectives while remarking that "hearing the same thing over and over again doesn't add value to the committee at all." Submissions were held in Auckland on 8 October and scheduled for Christchurch on 11 October and Wellington on 15 October.

On 14 February 2020, the Select Committee delivered its report which called for safeguards to address sex selection, late-term abortions and to remove some barriers for women seeking abortions. Another recommendation was requiring a health professional approving abortion after 20 weeks to consult at least one other health professional before authorising an abortion. The definition for consultation was also widened to include Registered Nurses as well and qualified medical practitioners. In addition, Loheni published a minority report criticizing the bill for what she regarded as a lack of safeguards on foetal abnormalities and late-term abortions. ACT New Zealand leader David Seymour supported the Select Committee's recommendations, but argued that safe zones infringed on freedom of expression.

The New Zealand Medical Association welcomed the changes while Catholic bishops have claimed that the legislation infringes upon the legal rights of unborn children and threatens unborn babies with a fetal disability. Select Committee member Agnes Loheni, who was opposed to the legislation, proposed a supplementary order paper which would return the post 20 week criteria for abortion to where it currently stands under the Crimes Act.

=== Second reading ===
On 3 March 2020, the Abortion Legislation Act passed its second reading, albeit by a narrower margin of 81 votes in favor and 39 votes opposed. 35 organisations including Family Planning, the National Council of Women of New Zealand, the New Zealand College of Midwives, the New Zealand Nurses Organisation, the Mental Health Foundation of New Zealand, and Amnesty International Aotearoa NZ signed an open letter supporting the legislation. The anti-abortion group March for Life NZ used graphic images of aborted fetuses to express their opposition. 1300 people in families with Down syndrome subsequently signed an open letter to the Prime Minister calling on the Government to not introduce abortion up-to-birth for Down syndrome.

Voting at second reading (3 March 2020)
Party	Voted for	Voted against
National (55)	25: Amy Adams; Paula Bennett; Andrew Bayly; David Bennett; Dan Bidois; Chris Bishop; David Carter; Judith Collins; Matt Doocey; Andrew Falloon; Brett Hudson; Nikki Kaye; Matt King; Barbara Kuriger; Ian McKelvie; Mark Mitchell; Scott Simpson; Stuart Smith; Erica Stanford; Anne Tolley; Tim van de Molen; Nicky Wagner; Hamish Walker; Nicola Willis; Jian Yang	30: Kanwaljit Singh Bakshi; Maggie Barry; Simon Bridges; Simeon Brown; Gerry Brownlee; Jacqui Dean; Sarah Dowie; Paulo Garcia; Paul Goldsmith; Nathan Guy; Jo Hayes; Harete Hipango; Denise Lee; Melissa Lee; Agnes Loheni; Tim Macindoe; Todd McClay; Todd Muller; Alfred Ngaro; Simon O'Connor; Parmjeet Parmar; Chris Penk; Maureen Pugh; Shane Reti; Alastair Scott; Nick Smith; Louise Upston; Michael Woodhouse; Jonathan Young; Lawrence Yule
Labour (46)	37: Kiri Allan; Ginny Andersen; Jacinda Ardern; David Clark; Tāmati Coffey; Liz Craig; Clare Curran; Kelvin Davis; Ruth Dyson; Paul Eagle; Kris Faafoi; Peeni Henare; Chris Hipkins; Raymond Huo; Willie Jackson; Iain Lees-Galloway; Andrew Little; Marja Lubeck; Jo Luxton; Trevor Mallard; Kieran McAnulty; Stuart Nash; David Parker; Willow-Jean Prime; Priyanca Radhakrishnan; Grant Robertson; Deborah Russell; Carmel Sepuloni; William Sio; Jan Tinetti; Phil Twyford; Louisa Wall; Angie Warren-Clark; Duncan Webb; Poto Williams; Michael Wood; Megan Woods	9: Anahila Kanongata'a-Suisuiki; Nanaia Mahuta; Damien O'Connor; Greg O'Connor; Adrian Rurawhe; Jenny Salesa; Jamie Strange; Rino Tirikatene; Meka Whaitiri
NZ First (9)	9: Darroch Ball; Shane Jones; Jenny Marcroft; Ron Mark; Tracey Martin; Clayton Mitchell; Mark Patterson; Winston Peters; Fletcher Tabuteau	–
Green (8)	8: Marama Davidson; Julie Anne Genter; Golriz Ghahraman; Gareth Hughes; Jan Logie; Eugenie Sage; James Shaw; Chlöe Swarbrick	–
ACT (1)	1: David Seymour	–
Independent (1)	1: Jami-Lee Ross	–
Totals	81	39

=== Committee of the Whole House stage ===
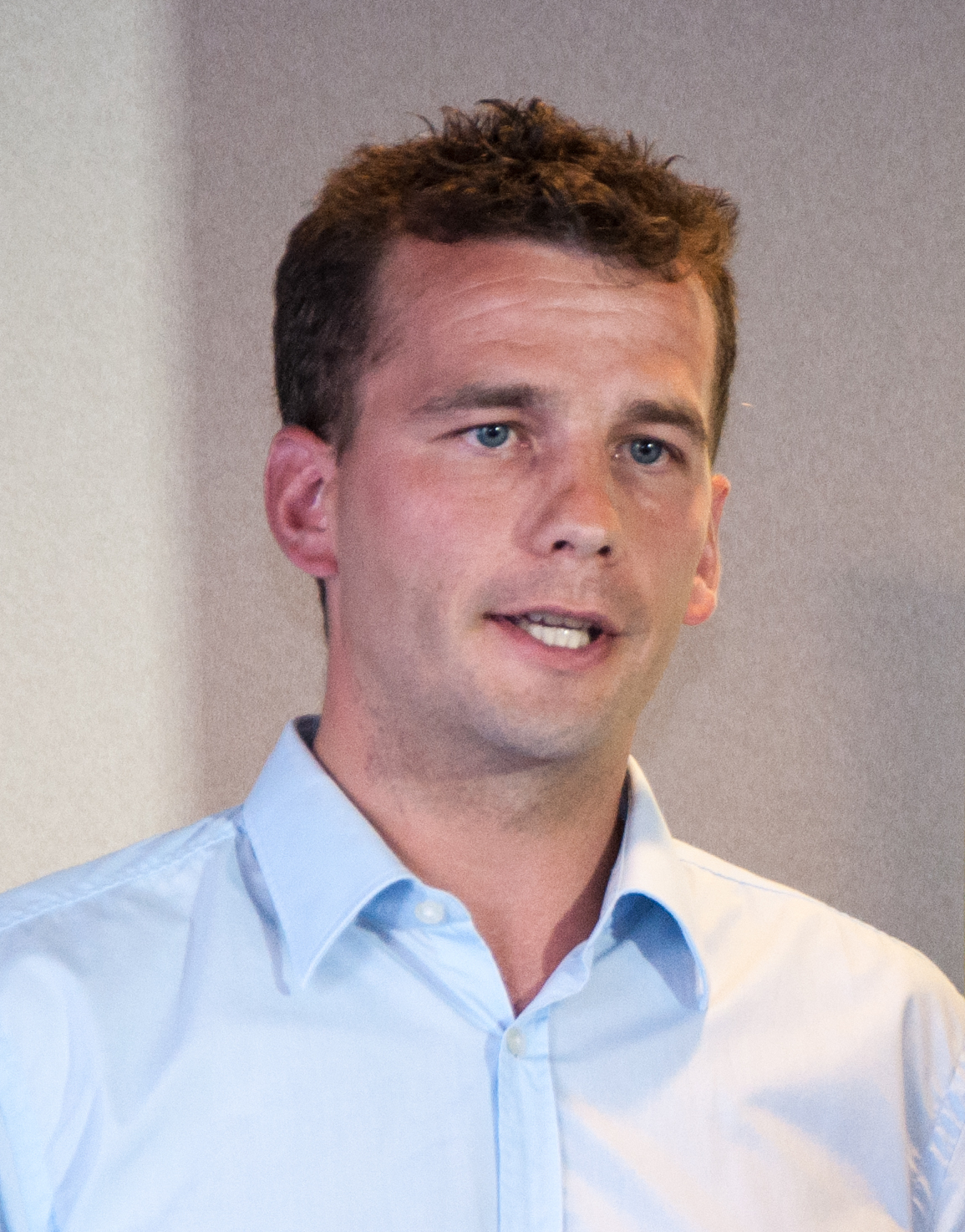
ACT Leader David Seymour, successfully moved a motion eliminating "safe zones" from the Act.

The Committee of the Whole House stage began on 10 March 2020. On the first day of debate on Part 1, parliamentarians narrowly rejected, by 56–59, the first part of David Seymour's amendment to scrap "safe zones" from the Act. However, the second part of Seymour's amendment, which effectively scrapped the proposed "safe zones", was passed during a voting mix-up (but re-addressed in a later law, see § Safe access zone legislation). Parliament also adopted an amendment by Ruth Dyson dealing with conscientious objectors. In addition, Parliament considered but rejected several amendments including:

- Green co-leader Marama Davidson's amendment reducing penalties around safe zones and removing political involvement in their setting up (21–96);
- An amendment to remove all statutory tests for abortions up to birth (12–106);
- A supplementary order paper by National MP Parmjeet Parmar aiming to prevent gender-selective abortions failed; and
- An amendment by National MP Simon O'Connor requiring medical intervention of unintended live births after attempted termination (37–80).

On 18 March, parliamentarians voted against holding a referendum on the abortion law changes by margin of 100 to 19. New Zealand First had proposed a referendum on the changes in return for supporting the passage of the legislation through Parliament.

=== Third reading ===
On the evening of 18 March, the Abortion Legislation Act passed its third reading by a margin of 68 to 51. Green co-leader Marama Davidson attempted to reverse David Seymour's amendment eliminating safe zones around abortion clinics, but MPs voted by a margin 77 to 43 against it. During the final reading, the bill's initiator, Justice Minister Little, argued that it would make significant changes to the country's abortion framework by eliminating abortion from the Crimes Act. Parliamentary Under-Secretary to the Justice Minister, Jan Logie, hailed the bill's passage as a victory for women having the freedom to make decisions about having a child. Abortion Legislation Committee's chair Ruth Dyson and National MP Amy Adams welcomed the bill's passage as long overdue for women's rights, but expressed disappointment at the elimination of the safe zones around abortion clinics.

During the final reading, Labour List MP Kieran McAnulty spoke about his Catholic faith, and being adopted as a child, but supported women's reproductive rights. ACT Leader David Seymour expressed support for women's reproductive rights, and eliminating abortion from the Crimes Act, but defended his amendment to eliminate safe zones. Labour MP Marja Lubeck said that abortion was not a decision that women made lightly, describing the previous legislation as "archaic".

Several MPs opposed to the Abortion Legislation Act also made speeches during the final reading. National MP Agnes Loheni, a member of the Abortion Legislation Committee, described the bill as an "attack on our humanity". She highlighted the fact that 91.6% of the 25,000 submissions had opposed the bill. Labour MP Greg O'Connor expressed concerns that the Bill's Section 11 did not do enough to protect disabled infants, while talking about his experiences as the father of a disabled child. National MP Simon O'Connor claimed that the bill did not afford rights and dignity to unborn children. Fellow National MP Andrew Bayly expressed concerns that the bill would allow minors to seek abortions without the knowledge of their parents and guardians. National MP Chris Penk disputed assertions that the previous abortion legislation criminalised women, and claimed that the new bill would deny unborn children the right of protection under the law.

Voting at third reading (18 March 2020)
Party	Voted for	Voted against	Absent
National (55)	19: Amy Adams; Paula Bennett; David Bennett; Dan Bidois; Chris Bishop; David Carter; Judith Collins; Matt Doocey; Andrew Falloon; Brett Hudson; Nikki Kaye; Barbara Kuriger; Mark Mitchell; Scott Simpson; Erica Stanford; Anne Tolley; Nicky Wagner; Nicola Willis; Jian Yang	35: Kanwaljit Singh Bakshi; Andrew Bayly; Maggie Barry; Simon Bridges; Simeon Brown; Gerry Brownlee; Jacqui Dean; Sarah Dowie; Paulo Garcia; Paul Goldsmith; Nathan Guy; Jo Hayes; Harete Hipango; Matt King; Denise Lee; Melissa Lee; Agnes Loheni; Tim Macindoe; Todd McClay; Ian McKelvie; Todd Muller; Alfred Ngaro; Simon O'Connor; Parmjeet Parmar; Chris Penk; Maureen Pugh; Shane Reti; Alastair Scott; Nick Smith; Louise Upston; Tim van de Molen; Hamish Walker; Michael Woodhouse; Jonathan Young; Lawrence Yule	1: Stuart Smith
Labour (46)	37: Kiri Allan; Ginny Andersen; Jacinda Ardern; David Clark; Tāmati Coffey; Liz Craig; Clare Curran; Kelvin Davis; Ruth Dyson; Paul Eagle; Kris Faafoi; Peeni Henare; Chris Hipkins; Raymond Huo; Willie Jackson; Iain Lees-Galloway; Andrew Little; Marja Lubeck; Jo Luxton; Trevor Mallard; Kieran McAnulty; Stuart Nash; David Parker; Willow-Jean Prime; Priyanca Radhakrishnan; Grant Robertson; Deborah Russell; Carmel Sepuloni; William Sio; Jan Tinetti; Phil Twyford; Louisa Wall; Angie Warren-Clark; Duncan Webb; Poto Williams; Michael Wood; Megan Woods	9: Anahila Kanongata'a-Suisuiki; Nanaia Mahuta; Damien O'Connor; Greg O'Connor; Adrian Rurawhe; Jenny Salesa; Jamie Strange; Rino Tirikatene; Meka Whaitiri	–
NZ First (9)	2: Jenny Marcroft; Tracey Martin	7: Darroch Ball; Shane Jones; Ron Mark; Clayton Mitchell; Mark Patterson; Winston Peters; Fletcher Tabuteau	–
Green (8)	8: Marama Davidson; Julie Anne Genter; Golriz Ghahraman; Gareth Hughes; Jan Logie; Eugenie Sage; James Shaw; Chlöe Swarbrick	–	–
ACT (1)	1: David Seymour	–	–
Independent (1)	1: Jami-Lee Ross	–	–
Totals	68	51	1

=== Royal assent and entry into force ===
The Act was given the Royal assent on 23 March, and came into force on 24 March.

== Safe access zone legislation ==
On 10 March 2021, a private members bill, the Contraception, Sterilisation, and Abortion (Safe Areas) Amendment Bill was introduced into the New Zealand Parliament. Its purpose is to create safe areas around abortion facilities, on a case-by-case basis, "to protect the safety and well-being, and respect the privacy and dignity, of women accessing abortion facilities and practitioners providing and assisting with abortion services".

On 16 March 2022, the Safe Areas Amendment Act passed into law by a margin of 108 to 12 votes. It received royal assent on 18 March. The Bill creates safe spaces of no more than 150 metres around abortion providers. It also bans obstructing, filming in an intimidating manner, dissuading or protesting against those trying to access abortion services in those zones.

== See also ==
- Abortion in New Zealand
- Contraception, Sterilisation, and Abortion Act 1977
- Crimes Act 1961
