= Minister for Digitising Government =

New Zealand minister of the Crown

- Coat of arms of New Zealand

- Flag of New Zealand

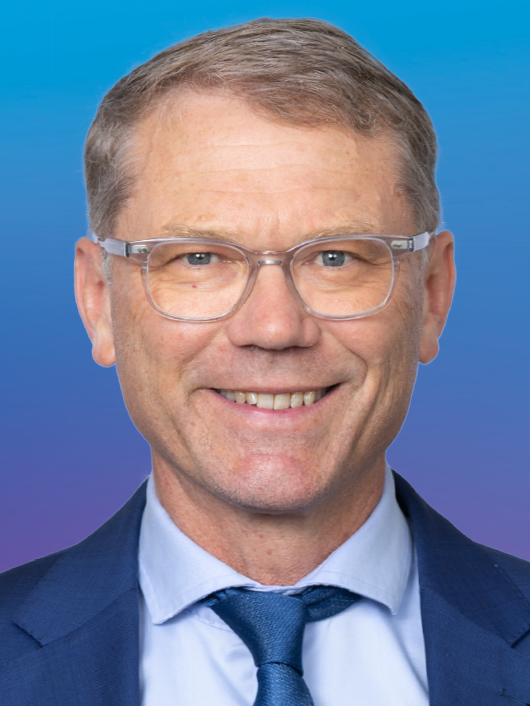
- Incumbent; Paul Goldsmith since 7 April 2026
- Ministry of Business, Innovation and Employment; Department of Internal Affairs; Department of the Prime Minister and Cabinet
- Style: The Honourable
- Member of: Cabinet of New Zealand; Executive Council
- Reports to: Prime Minister of New Zealand
- Appointer: Governor-General of New Zealand
- Term length: At His Majesty's pleasure
- Formation: 6 November 2020
- First holder: David Clark
- Website: Official website

The Minister for Digitising Government is a minister in the New Zealand Government with responsibilities including the delivery of the government's digital strategy, digital services delivery, and digital modernisation. The portfolio is supported by the Department of Internal Affairs and the Public Service Commission.

The present minister is Paul Goldsmith.

== History ==
Standalone ministerial responsibility for government digital services was created in October 2017 under the Sixth Labour Government. Clare Curran, the inaugural Minister for Government Digital Services, was also appointed Minister of Broadcasting, Communications, and Digital Media and Associate Minister of State Services. The portfolio's responsibilities then included the delivery of the government's digital strategy and digital government services, including the Digital Inclusion Blueprint and work relating to digital identity, and the Government Chief Digital Officer (previously the Government Chief Information Officer). Oversight of Government information technology was previously a responsibility of the Minister of Internal Affairs.

In November 2020, the beginning of the Labour government's second term, the position was combined with aspects of the Broadcasting, Communications, and Digital Media portfolio and retitled as the Minister for the Digital Economy and Communications (the remainder of that portfolio became the Minister of Broadcasting and Media). The purpose of the Digital Economy and Communications portfolio was to simplify and streamline digital workstreams across the New Zealand government, as well as to regulate the telecommunications and postal sectors, broadband infrastructure, and the radio spectrum. Those regulatory functions had previously been under the Minister of Communications and Information Technology. In this version of the role, the minister shared responsibility for cyber security matters with the minister responsible for the Government Communications Security Bureau. Former Minister of Internal Affairs Peter Dunne said the position was "extremely important... given New Zealand’s position as one of the world's most digitally advanced governments."

The portfolio was retitled with a refocused set of responsibilities for a third time after the 2023 general election. The communications-related responsibilities were assigned to the Minister for Media and Communications. Today, the portfolio's focus is digital strategy and service delivery. The minister is responsible for the Digital Executive Board, which "leads a whole-of-system approach to transform digital public services for New Zealand."

== List of ministers ==
Key

Labour National

No.	Name	Portrait	Term of Office		Prime Minister
Minister for Government Digital Services
1	Clare Curran		26 October 2017	24 August 2018	Ardern
2	Megan Woods		24 August 2018	28 June 2019	Ardern
3	Kris Faafoi		28 June 2019	6 November 2020	Ardern
Minister for the Digital Economy and Communications
3	David Clark		6 November 2020	1 February 2023	Ardern
3	David Clark		6 November 2020	1 February 2023	Hipkins
4	Ginny Andersen		1 February 2023	27 November 2023	Hipkins
Minister for Digitising Government
5	Judith Collins		27 November 2023	2 April 2026	Luxon
5	Paul Goldsmith		2 April 2026	present	Luxon
