= Anahila Kanongata'a =

New Zealand politician

Anahila Kanongata'a JP
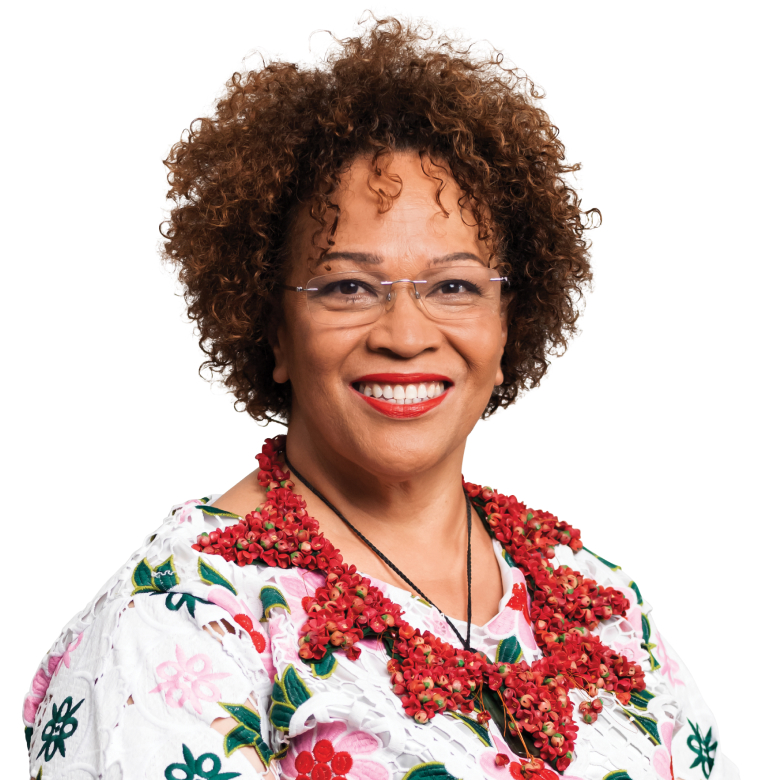
- Kanongata'a in 2023

Member of the New Zealand Parliament for Labour party list
- In office 23 September 2017 – 14 October 2023

Personal details
- Born: 1969 (age 56–57) Tonga
- Party: Labour
- Children: 4
- Education: University of Auckland

Anahila Lose Kanongata'a (born 1969) is a New Zealand social worker and politician. She served as a Member of Parliament for the Labour Party from 2017 to 2023.

== Early life and career ==
Kanongata'a was born in Tonga. When she was a child, her single mother went to work in New Zealand, leaving her children in the custody of her father. When her mother and stepfather became permanent residents, she came to New Zealand in 1980 and settled in a state house in Onehunga. At the time, she did not speak English. She left school in the sixth form and began working as a bank teller. She married her first husband and had two children before she turned 20.

Aged 30, Kanongata'a won a scholarship to study either economics or social work at the University of Auckland. She chose social work and worked as a social worker and manager for the Ministry of Social Development and Oranga Tamariki. She was on the national executive of P.A.C.I.F.I.C.A Incorporated.

She became a justice of the peace in 2013.

== Early political career ==
Kanongata'a made three attempts at a political career in the early 2010s. In 2010, under her married name Anahila Suisuiki, she contested a position on the Manurewa Local Board as an independent, finishing last among 16 candidates. Following this run, she joined the Labour Party and ran unsuccessfully as a list-only candidate at both the 2011 election (ranked 51) and 2014 election (ranked 49). She unsuccessfully contested the Labour Party candidate selection for Manukau East in 2014, losing to Jenny Salesa.

She held internal Labour party offices, including as the vice chair of Labour's women's council and as chair of the Manurewa electorate committee.

== Member of Parliament ==
New Zealand Parliament
Years	Term	Electorate	List	Party
2017–2020	52nd	List	37	Labour
2020–2023	53rd	List	44	Labour

=== First term, 2017–2020 ===
Kanongata'a stood as a list only candidate for Labour at the 2017 election (ranked 37) and was elected as a list MP through Labour's party vote result of 36.9%.

In her first term, she served on the health committee (2017–2018) and the social services committee (2018–2020). She was appointed to the Abortion Legislation Committee, which considered the Abortion Legislation Bill that proposed eliminating most legal restrictions on abortion in New Zealand, in 2019. She opposed the bill during all three readings of the bill in Parliament, which subsequently passed into law in March 2020.

In March 2018, a private member's bill in Kanongata'a's name was drawn from the member's ballot and subsequently was introduced to Parliament. The Oaths and Declarations (Members of Parliament) Amendment Bill sought to enable members of Parliament to make their oaths of allegiance in a language other than English or te reo Māori, which are the two allowed languages under the Oaths and Declarations Act 1957. Members may make an unofficial oath in another language with the consent of the House, but must make one in an official language. The bill failed at its first reading 54–65.

=== Second term, 2020–2023 ===
In the 2020 New Zealand general election, Kanongata'a contested the Papakura electorate, challenging Judith Collins, the Leader of the Opposition. Kanongata'a-Suisuiki lost to Collins by a final margin of 5,583 votes. However, she returned to Parliament on the Labour Party list. In her second term, she served on the environment committee and the social services committee.

A second member's bill in Kanongata'a's name was drawn in June 2020. The District Court (Protection of Judgment Debtors with Disabilities) Amendment Bill proposed a prohibition on the seizure of items from judgment debtors with disabilities if those items are necessary for their care, support or independence. The bill passed its third reading unanimously on 30 June 2021. Another judgment debtors bill in Kanongata'a's name was drawn on 27 July 2023. The District Court (Protecting Judgment Debtors on Main Benefit) Amendment Bill did not complete its first reading before the House rose for the 2023 general election, in which Kanonga'ata was not re-elected; it was subsequently transferred to Duncan Webb.

In March 2021, Kanongata'a voted against the proposed Contraception, Sterilisation, and Abortion (Safe Areas) Amendment Act 2022, claiming that the creation of safe areas around abortion providers amounted to the "erosion of freedom of expression". She also voted against the bill during its second and third readings in 2022.

In January 2022, with colleague Jenny Salesa, Kanonga'ata set up the Aotearoa Tonga Relief Committee to support the response to the 2022 Hunga Tonga–Hunga Haʻapai eruption and tsunami.

During the 2023 New Zealand general election, Kanonga'ata contested the Papakura electorate a second time but failed to unseat National MP Judith Collins, who won by a margin of 13,519 votes. Ranked 34 on the Labour Party list, she was not returned to Parliament due to Labour's poorer result than at the previous election.

=== 2026 general election ===
During the 2026 New Zealand general election, Kanonga'ata contested the Papakura for Labour. She was ranked 47th on the Labour Party list. On 7 November, Kanonga'ata came second place in the Papakura race with 7,724 votes based on preliminary results.

== Personal views ==
Kanonga'ata was a member of the social conservative wing of the Labour Party. She consistently voted against progressive legislation including the End of Life Choice Bill, the Abortion Legislation Bill, and the Contraception, Sterilisation, and Abortion (Safe Areas) Amendment Bill. In some speeches, she attributed her views to her Christian faith.
