= English Language Act 2026 =

Act of Parliament in New Zealand

New Zealand Parliament
- Royal assent: 6 August 2026

Legislative history
- Introduced by: Paul Goldsmith
- Committee responsible: Justice Select Committee
- First reading: 3 March 2026
- Second reading: 21 July 2026
- Third reading: 30 July 2026
- Status: Current legislation

The English Language Act 2026 is a New Zealand act of Parliament that designates the English language as an official language in legislation, alongside Māori and New Zealand Sign Language. The bill was introduced into the New Zealand Parliament by the Sixth National Government on 19 February 2026, and passed its first reading on 3 March 2026. The bill passed its third and final reading on 30 July 2026. It received royal assent on 6 August 2026.

== Key provisions ==
The English Language Act 2026 provides for the official recognition of the English language as an official language of New Zealand in legislation.

== Legislative history ==
=== Background ===
In 2018, New Zealand First MP Clayton Mitchell introduced a bill to parliament to statutorily recognise English as an official language. By May 2020, the bill had not progressed.

During the 2023 New Zealand general election, the New Zealand First party campaigned on promoting English to the status of an official language of New Zealand. Following coalition talks, NZ First entered into a coalition agreement with the National and ACT parties in late November 2023. As part of New Zealand First's coalition agreement with National, the Government agreed to pass legislation designating English as an official language of New Zealand.

=== Introduction ===
On 19 February 2026, Justice Minister Paul Goldsmith introduced the English Language Bill into the New Zealand Parliament. Goldsmith said that the bill was not a priority for the National-led government but was part of National's coalition agreement with New Zealand First. During his speech supporting the bill, NZ First leader Winston Peters claimed that the increasing use of the Māori language in official communications had caused misunderstanding and confusion. Opposition Members of Parliament including Labour MPs Duncan Webb, Ayesha Verrall and Green Party co-leader Chlöe Swarbrick described the proposed bill as unnecessary due to the de-facto status of English in New Zealand. Due to a filibuster mounted by opposition parties on the previous bill, the first reading was delayed.

On 3 March 2026, the English Language Bill passed its first reading with the support of the National, ACT, New Zealand First and Labour parties. Goldsmith, Peters, ACT MP Simon Court and National MP Rima Nakhle issued statements supporting the bill as part of National's coalition agreement with NZ First and sought to allay fears it would marginalise the Māori language. Labour MP Kieran McAnulty, Swarbrick, Te Pāti Māori co-leader Rawiri Waititi described the bill as unnecessary and divisive. While the Labour Party regarded the bill as unnecessary, its acting arts, culture and heritage spokesperson Willow-Jean Prime said that her party had decided to support the bill for procedural reasons, stating "we reluctantly support this bill so we can all just move on from this needless culture war." Parliament did not call for a party vote on the bill's passage during its first reading. Swarbrick later stated that not calling for a vote was a mistake and that the Greens would have cast 15 votes against.

=== Select committee stage ===
Following its first reading, the English Language Bill was referred to the Justice select committee. By late June 2026, the bill had received written submissions from 1,601 individuals and groups, and 22 oral submissions. Almost two-thirds of submitters opposed the bill, with common arguments being that it was a waste of time, undermined the Māori language and New Zealand Sign Language, and risked stoking division. Supporters argued that the bill posed little harm, would remove confusion and address concerns that English was being treated differently from New Zealand's two official languages.

The Labour and Green parties also opposed the English Language Bill, contending that English did not need official status unlike Māori and New Zealand Sign Language because it was not threatened and that the bill was a waste of time in the midst of cost of living and fuel crises. On 28 June, the Justice select committee recommended that the bill be progressed without any further changes despite opposition from submitters and opposition parties. The committee's chairman, National Party MP Andrew Bayly, argued that the bill would not undermine Māori and NZ Sign Language but would recognise that English was widely used in New Zealand.

=== Final readings ===
The English Language Bill passed its second reading on 21 July 2026 by a margin of 101 to 20 votes. The bill was supported by the National, Labour, ACT and New Zealand First parties while the Green Party, Te Pāti Māori, and independent MPs Takuta Ferris and Mariameno Kapa-Kingi voted against it.

The bill passed its third reading on 30 July. While the bill was supported by the National, Labour, ACT and NZ First parties, it was opposed by the Green Party and Te Pāti Māori. NZ First MP Casey Costello said that the bill provided clarity and certainty in legislation, and denied it would change any of the legal protections afforded to the Māori language and New Zealand Sign Language. ACT MP Simon Court said there was public support for the bill given its widespread usage in New Zealand society. Several National MPs including Carl Bates, Paulo Garcia, Greg Fleming and Vanessa Weenink issued statements and speeches supporting the bill's passage into law. Despite its philosophical opposition to the bill, Labour supported the bill's passage into law. Labour MP Duncan Webb described the bill as "silly and meaningless" while fellow Labour MP Camilla Belich said NZ First was trying to "politicise" an "evident truth."

On the opposing side, Green MP Tamatha Paul argued that the bill was motivated by the coalition government's fear of the Māori language and culture, while fellow Green MP Lawrence Xu-Nan questioned what Parliament was seeking to protect the English language from. Te Pāti Māori MP Oriini Kaipara argued that the bill was unnecessary given the privileged position of the English language in New Zealand. The bill received royal assent on 6 August 2026.

== Responses ==
Language advocate and academic Vincent Ieni Olsen-Reeder argued that the English Language Bill did not fulfill its stated goals of advancing the English language in New Zealand. Similarly, Auckland University of Technology linguist Sharon Harvey described the proposed bill as "vexatious and unnecessary."

== See also ==
- English-only movement
- German language in the Basic Law
- Languages of New Zealand
