= Minister of Communications (New Zealand) =

New Zealand minister of the Crown

The Minister of Communications is a defunct ministerial position in the New Zealand Government which was in use from 1990 to 2017. The occupant of the office was responsible for the government's communications sector policies and regulatory system, including the regulation of the telecommunications and postal sectors, the roll-out of ultra-fast broadband, rural broadband and radio spectrum management. The title has been discontinued since 2017 and combined with other portfolios, notably broadcasting.

== History ==
The position was created in 1990 and was in use until 2017, when it was combined for the first time with the broadcasting portfolio (as Minister of Broadcasting, Communications and Digital Media). Previously, from December 2016 to October 2017, the broadcasting portfolio had been disestablished with some of its responsibilities assigned to the Minister of Communications. Between 2020 and 2023, communications policy was the responsibility of the Minister for the Digital Economy and Communications. Since 2023, the responsible minister is the Minister for Media and Communications.

Year 2000 preparedness in New Zealand was led by the Minister of Communications and Information Technology. A major activity within the portfolio from 2008 onward was the implementation of the Ultra-Fast Broadband programme.

Administrative and policy support was provided to the minister by the Ministries of Commerce; Economic Development; and Business, Innovation and Employment.

=== Minister of Information Technology ===
Between 1993 and 2007, the holder of the communications portfolio was additionally appointed as Minister of Information Technology. Those two portfolios were combined under a single title, the Minister of Communications and Information Technology, between 2007 and 2014. A standalone communications portfolio was restored after the 2014 general election and responsibility for information and technology was assigned to the Minister of Economic Development.

== List of ministers ==
The following ministers have held the office of Minister of Communications.

Key

Labour National

No.	Name	Portrait	Term of office		Prime minister	Relationship with Information Technology portfolio
1	Jonathan Hunt		9 February 1990	2 November 1990	Palmer	None.
1	Jonathan Hunt		9 February 1990	2 November 1990	Moore	None.
2	Maurice Williamson		2 November 1990	10 December 1999	Bolger	From 29 November 1993, additionally appointed as Minister of Information Technology.
2	Maurice Williamson		2 November 1990	10 December 1999	Shipley	From 29 November 1993, additionally appointed as Minister of Information Technology.
3	Paul Swain		10 December 1999	21 December 2004	Clark	Additionally appointed as Minister of Information Technology.
4	David Cunliffe		21 December 2004	19 December 2008	Clark	Until 5 November 2007, additionally appointed as Minister of Information Technology; thereafter titled Minister of Communications and Information Technology.
5	Steven Joyce		19 November 2008	14 December 2011	Key	Titled Minister of Communications and Information Technology.
6	Amy Adams		14 December 2011	20 December 2016	Key	Until 6 October 2014, titled Minister of Communications and Information Technology; thereafter titled Minister of Communications.
7	Simon Bridges		20 December 2016	26 October 2017	English	Additionally appointed Minister of Economic Development.

== See also ==
- Minister of Media and Communications
- Minister of Digitising Government (previously Minister for the Digital Economy and Communications)

== Works cited ==
- Wilson, Jim (1985) [First published in 1913]. New Zealand Parliamentary Record, 1840–1984 (4th ed.). Wellington: V.R. Ward, Govt. Printer. OCLC 154283103.
- Wood, G.A., ed. (1996). Ministers and Members in the New Zealand Parliament (2nd ed.). Dunedin: University of Otago Press. ISBN 1-877133-00-0.
- Spanhake, Craig, ed. (2006). Ministers and Members in the New Zealand Parliament: 1996-2005. Dunedin: Tarkwode Press. ISBN 0-9597868-2-1.
