= David Clark (New Zealand politician) =

New Zealand politician

The Honourable David Clark
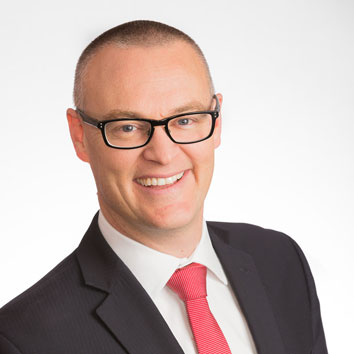
- Clark in 2020

14th Minister of Commerce and Consumer Affairs
- In office 6 November 2020 – 1 February 2023
- Prime Minister: Jacinda Ardern; Chris Hipkins
- Preceded by: Kris Faafoi
- Succeeded by: Duncan Webb

20th Minister Responsible for the Earthquake Commission
- In office 6 November 2020 – 1 February 2023
- Prime Minister: Jacinda Ardern; Chris Hipkins
- Preceded by: Grant Robertson
- Succeeded by: Deborah Russell

16th Minister for State Owned Enterprises
- In office 6 November 2020 – 1 February 2023
- Prime Minister: Jacinda Ardern; Chris Hipkins
- Preceded by: Winston Peters
- Succeeded by: Duncan Webb

31st Minister of Statistics
- In office 6 November 2020 – 1 February 2023
- Prime Minister: Jacinda Ardern; Chris Hipkins
- Preceded by: James Shaw
- Succeeded by: Deborah Russell

1st Minister for the Digital Economy and Communications
- In office 6 November 2020 – 1 February 2023
- Prime Minister: Jacinda Ardern; Chris Hipkins
- Succeeded by: Ginny Andersen

40th Minister of Health
- In office 26 October 2017 – 2 July 2020
- Prime Minister: Jacinda Ardern
- Preceded by: Jonathan Coleman
- Succeeded by: Chris Hipkins

Member of the New Zealand Parliament for Dunedin Dunedin North (2011–2020)
- In office 26 November 2011 – 14 October 2023
- Preceded by: Pete Hodgson
- Succeeded by: Rachel Brooking

Personal details
- Born: 5 January 1973 (age 53)
- Party: Labour
- Spouse: Katrina
- Children: 3
- Education: University of Otago; Eberhard Karls University
- Occupation: Treasury analyst Presbyterian minister
- Website: www.davidclark.org.nz

David Scott Clark (born 5 January 1973) is a former New Zealand Labour Party politician.

He was the Member of Parliament representing Dunedin (previously Dunedin North) from 2011 to 2023 and was twice a Cabinet minister in the Sixth Labour Government led by Jacinda Ardern. Clark was Minister of Health from 2017 until July 2020, when he resigned after multiple controversies related to the response to COVID-19. He was returned to Cabinet in November 2020, holding various economic portfolios, and retired from politics at the 2023 general election.

== Early life and family ==
Clark was born to parents Faye, a doctor, and Richard Clark, a businessman, in 1973. He grew up in Beachlands, just south of Auckland, and was schooled in Auckland. He studied at Saint Kentigern College and spent his last year on a school exchange in Germany, immersing himself in the German language.

In 1991, Clark moved to Dunedin to study at the University of Otago. He initially studied medicine but abandoned that in favour of pursuing degrees in theology and philosophy. Clark also studied theology and philosophy at Eberhard Karls University in Tübingen. He was ordained as a Presbyterian minister in 1997 and worked as the assistant minister at St Luke's Presbyterian Church in Auckland. After leaving professional ministry he continued to provide celebrant services, including at the civil union of Grant Robertson in 2009, as well Trevor Mallard's second marriage in 2014.

Clark later returned to the University of Otago and in 2004 completed a PhD on the work of German/New Zealand refugee and existentialist thinker Helmut Rex. After his graduation he also worked as a Treasury analyst and an advisor to then-climate change minister David Parker. From 2008 and 2011, Clark was the warden of Selwyn College at the University of Otago and deputy chair of the Otago Community Trust.

Clark is married to Katrina, and they have three children. His brother, Ben, stood for Labour in the North Shore at the 2011 election, placing second behind Maggie Barry. During his university years, Clark was a competitive cyclist and has twice completed the Ironman Triathlon.

== Member of Parliament ==
New Zealand Parliament
Years	Term	Electorate	List	Party
2011–2014	50th	Dunedin North	49	Labour
2014–2017	51st	Dunedin North	26	Labour
2017–2020	52nd	Dunedin North	9	Labour
2020–2023	53rd	Dunedin	16	Labour

After serving as chairman on the Labour Party Dunedin North electorate committee, Clark was selected by the Labour Party to replace the retiring Pete Hodgson in the electorate. He won the seat at the 2011 election over National candidate Michael Woodhouse. Clark would defeat Woodhouse again in each of the following three elections, increasing his majority every time to a final margin of 15,521 votes in 2020.

Clark's maiden parliamentary speech given on 14 February 2012 focused on his concern about rising inequality and his passion for social justice. In it, he argued that a more equal society will produce better outcomes, both socially and economically.

Clark and Labour were in opposition for the first six years of his political career. Under leaders David Shearer, David Cunliffe and Andrew Little, Clark served as the party's spokesperson in a range of economic portfolios, including revenue, economic development and small business. During his time as revenue spokesperson, he drew attention to difficulties the dated Inland Revenue computer system was creating for the organisation, and the small amounts that multinational companies were contributing to the tax base.

Clark completed an Eisenhower Fellowship in 2013, focusing much of his trip on the priority accorded to the values of fairness and freedom in New Zealand and the United States. The same year, Parliament passed a private member's bill in Clark's name. The bill proposed "Mondayisation" of Waitangi Day and Anzac Day so that additional public holidays would be held if the true dates for those holidays occurred on a weekend. This was the first bill to pass against the Government in four years.

Another member's bill in Clark's name, aimed at preventing for-profit entities from running charter schools, was selected for a first reading in 2017. However, the bill was eventually dropped as the legislative framework for charter schools was repealed. After the retirement of long-serving Labour MP Annette King was announced in March 2017, Clark became the Labour Party's health spokesperson. When Labour formed a government seven months later, Clark became the Minister of Health.

== Minister in the Sixth Labour Government ==
After the 2017 general election, the Labour Party formed a government with New Zealand First and the Greens. Clark was appointed to the Cabinet as Minister of Health and Associate Minister of Finance. His delegations in the finance portfolio included expenditure control in the social sector and responsibility for Crown Research Institutes and community trusts. Clark was removed from his positions during the COVID-19 pandemic after breaking the country's pandemic restrictions and becoming a "distraction." He was reappointed to Cabinet as Minister of Commerce and Consumer Affairs, Minister of Statistics, Minister for the Digital Economy and Communications and Minister for State Owned Enterprises after Labour's success in the 2020 general election.

=== Minister of Health ===
In late April 2018, Clark appointed three new chairs to head Auckland's three district health boards: Patrick Snedden for the Auckland District Health Board, Judy McGregor for the Waitematā District Health Board, and Vui Mark Gosche for the Counties Manukau District Health Board. These appointments replaced Lester Levy, who had headed all three boards and resigned in December 2017. On 30 April 2018, Clark conceded that the Government would be unable to deliver on its election promise of reducing general practitioner fees but indicated that it would be introduced in phases over time.

On 4 May 2018, Clark announced that the Dunedin Hospital would be replaced by a new hospital on the site of the former Cadbury factory site and a neighbouring block that included the building occupied by Work and Income. The construction project is estimated to cost NZ$1.4 billion, would involve around a thousand workers, and is expected to be completed by 2026.

In mid-June 2018, Clark was criticised by employees of the Counties Manukau District Health Board for allegedly trying to silence their reports of run-down buildings, asbestos, and overflowing sewage at Middlemore Hospital. Clark denied those allegations but criticised the staff for communicating through the media rather than through official channels. Clark subsequently apologised to Counties Manukau DHB chairman Rabin Rabindran for the handling of the Middlemore saga. That same month, Clark defended the Government's $500 million pay offer to nurses after the national union, the New Zealand Nurses Organisation, voted to go on strike.

In mid-July 2018, Clark was forced to publicly defend his decision to go on a family holiday prior to a planned national strike by the Nurses Organisation. On 25 July, Clark—alongside union representatives from the E tū and the Public Service Association as well as the Ministry of Social Development and the Accident Compensation Corporation—signed a NZ$173.5 million pay equity agreement to pay 5,000 mental health and addiction workers more. Later that month, he announced that the District Health Boards, Nurses Organisation, and the Ministry of Health had successfully negotiated a joint accord to ensure safe staffing levels for nurses.

In early September 2018, Clark suspended the troubled Oracle IT project to overhaul the District Health Boards' ageing IT systems. The troubled project had cost NZ$100 million. In mid-November, Clark announced that the Government had scrapped plans for a proposed third medical school in the Waikato region on the grounds that the project would have cost billions to set up and operate. On 19 November, he also announced that the Government would establish a NZ$20 million new health centre in the South Island town of Westport.

In May 2019, he removed the Waikato District Health Board from office, replacing them with Dr Karen Poutasi as commissioner. Elections to the board scheduled for October 2019 were cancelled.

=== COVID-19 pandemic ===
As Minister of Health, Clark took a leadership role in the Government's response to the COVID-19 pandemic in New Zealand. In early April 2020, Clark drew media attention and public criticism when he drove to a Dunedin park two kilometres away from his home to ride a mountain bike trail despite the Government's COVID-19 pandemic lockdown. Clark later apologised to prime minister Jacinda Ardern for ignoring official guidelines advising against non-essential travel. During the first week of the country's national lock-down he also drove his family twenty kilometres to a beach for a walk. Ardern subsequently announced that Clark offered his resignation, but due to his role in the response to the COVID-19 pandemic, she did not accept it, instead depriving him of his ministerial role as Associate Finance Minister and demoting him to the bottom of Labour's Cabinet ranking.

In late June 2020, Clark attracted media attention and criticism following a press conference at which he stated, "The director-general [Ashley Bloomfield] has accepted that protocols weren't being followed, he has accepted responsibility for that and has set about putting it right". His remark was interpreted by some journalists as blaming Bloomfield for the Ministry of Health's mismanagement of quarantine following a recent outbreak stemming from overseas travel. The Spinoff's editor Toby Manhire opined that Clark's "humility bypass" created problems for Ardern's government. Left-wing commentator Chris Trotter described Clark's handling of the situation as "shameful" and called on Ardern to dismiss him from his position. Right-wing commentator Trish Anderson criticised Clark for not "'pulling his weight' in the government" and criticised Ardern's perceived inaction against him as a "failure of leadership." Clark's Wikipedia article was also vandalised with remarks attacking his handling of the press conference with Bloomfield.

In early July 2020, Clark announced that he was resigning as Minister of Health, stating that "I've always taken a view that the team must come first ... so I've made the call that it's best for me to step aside." Ardern accepted his resignation, stating that she "accepted Clark's conclusion that his presence in the role was creating an unhelpful distraction from the Government's ongoing response to Covid-19 and wider health reforms."

On 2 July 2020, Clark was granted retention of the title The Honourable, in recognition of his term as a member of the Executive Council.

=== Final term ===
On 2 November 2020, Prime Minister Ardern announced that Clark would be returning to Cabinet but would not be holding his former Health portfolio. Instead, he would pick up the Commerce and Consumer Affairs, Statistics, Digital Economy and Communications and State Owned Enterprises portfolios, as well as becoming Minister Responsible for the Earthquake Commission. During the 2020–2023 term, Clark sponsored the Grocery Industry Competition Bill, which seeks to address excessive supermarket profits and encourage more competition within that sector. He also took an interest in the Commerce Commission's research into the supermarket, construction supplies, and banking sectors.

On 13 December 2022, Clark announced his intention to retire from politics at the 2023 general election. On 31 January 2023, prime minister Chris Hipkins announced a Cabinet re-shuffle of ministerial portfolios, and Clark's portfolios were transferred to other ministers. He was briefly deputy chair of the Finance and Expenditure Committee from April until September 2023.

== Political views ==
Clark said he regarded himself, within church circles, as a liberal. He voted in support of the Marriage (Definition of Marriage) Amendment Bill in 2013 and the Abortion Legislation Bill in 2020. He opposed the End of Life Choice Bill in 2019. He supports more liberalisation of drug laws, saying: "prohibition doesn't work."

== Later career ==
Clark was appointed registrar of the University of Otago in 2023.

New Zealand Parliament
Preceded by Pete Hodgson	Member of Parliament for Dunedin North; 2011–2020	Constituency abolished
New constituency	Member of Parliament for Dunedin; 2020–2023	Succeeded by Rachel Brooking
Political offices
Preceded by Jonathan Coleman	Minister of Health; 2017–2020	Succeeded by Chris Hipkins
Preceded by Kris Faafoi	Minister of Commerce and Consumer Affairs; 2020–2023	Succeeded by Duncan Webb
Preceded by Winston Peters	Minister for State Owned Enterprises; 2020–2023	Succeeded by Duncan Webb
Preceded by Grant Robertson	Minister Responsible for the Earthquake Commission; 2020–2023	Succeeded by Deborah Russell
Preceded by James Shaw	Minister of Statistics; 2020–2023	Succeeded by Deborah Russell
New office	Minister for the Digital Economy and Communications; 2020–2023	Succeeded by Ginny Andersen
