= Foetal impairment =

Foetal impairment(s) were grounds for an abortion in New Zealand. until the Abortion Legislation Act 2020 decriminalised abortion.

Foetal impairment is the existence of life-threatening or serious anatomical signs that will lead to either an impaired quality of life or at worst, lethal anatomical malformation which renders the foetus unable to survive outside a pregnant woman's body. It was one of several grounds contained within New Zealand's Contraception, Sterilisation and Abortion Act 1977, amended 1978, and Section 187A of the Crimes Act 1961.

Serious danger to the mental health of the woman was the grounds for 98–99% of abortions in New Zealand.
