= Amy Adams (politician) =

New Zealand politician

The Honourable Amy Adams
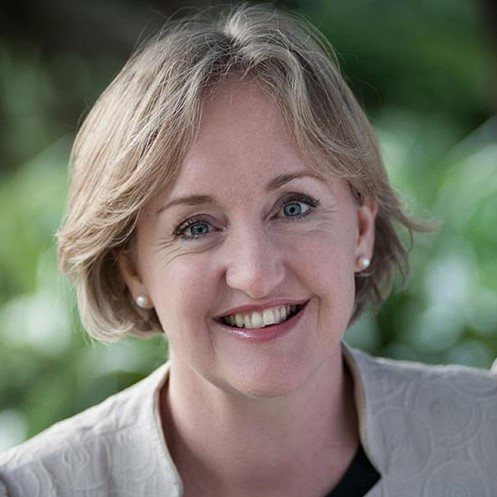

16th Chancellor of the University of Canterbury
- Incumbent
- Assumed office 2 March 2022
- Preceded by: Susan McCormack

Member of the New Zealand Parliament for Selwyn
- In office 8 November 2008 – 17 October 2020
- Preceded by: Electorate re-established
- Succeeded by: Nicola Grigg

8th Minister for Courts
- In office 8 October 2014 – 26 October 2017
- Prime Minister: John Key; Bill English
- Preceded by: Chester Borrows
- Succeeded by: Andrew Little

48th Minister of Justice
- In office 8 October 2014 – 26 October 2017
- Prime Minister: John Key; Bill English
- Preceded by: Judith Collins
- Succeeded by: Andrew Little

26th Minister for Social Housing
- In office 20 December 2016 – 26 October 2017
- Prime Minister: Bill English
- Preceded by: Paula Bennett
- Succeeded by: Phil Twyford

Personal details
- Born: Amy Juliet Milnes; 19 May 1971 (age 55) Auckland, New Zealand
- Party: National
- Spouse: Don Adams
- Children: 2
- Education: University of Canterbury
- Profession: Lawyer
- Website: amyadams.co.nz

Amy Juliet Adams (née Milnes; born 19 May 1971) is a New Zealand lawyer and former politician. Since 2022, she has served as the chancellor of the University of Canterbury.

Adams was a National Party Member of Parliament, representing the Selwyn electorate from 2008 to 2020, when she retired. She served as Minister for the Environment, Minister of Communications, and Minister of Justice in the Fifth National Government.

== Early life and family ==
Adams was born in 1971. When she was two, her mother divorced her father, raising her and her sister Belinda alone. Adams attended Rangitoto College on the North Shore of Auckland, where she was friends with Louise Upston (also later a National Party politician), then graduated from the University of Canterbury with a Bachelor of Laws with First-Class Honours. Her first employment as a lawyer was in Invercargill, but she soon moved back to Canterbury. She became a partner in the Christchurch law firm Mortlock McCormack.

Adams married Robert Donald "Don" Adams, with whom she has two children. The couple live in Aylesbury, close to the fault line and epicentre of the 2010 Canterbury earthquake. They also own three farms in Darfield, Kirwee, and Te Kauwhata. The first two of these are sheep and crop farms in Canterbury, and within the area of the Central Plains Water scheme. Through their company Amdon Farms Ltd, the Adams family is a shareholder of Central Plains Water. The Te Kauwhata farm is located in the Waikato.

Adams' sister Belinda later worked in the office of Social Development Minister Paula Bennett and was appointed Families Commissioner in 2013. Adams' brother-in-law, David Ware is a telecommunications executive and publicly criticised Adams' actions while she was Minister for Communications and Information Technology.

== Political career ==
New Zealand Parliament
Years	Term	Electorate	List	Party
2008–2011	49th	Selwyn	52	National
2011–2014	50th	Selwyn	28	National
2014–2017	51st	Selwyn	15	National
2017–2020	52nd	Selwyn	7	National

=== Fifth National Government, 2008–2017 ===
Adams was selected as the National Party candidate for the Selwyn seat for the 2008 general election after a contested selection. She won the seat with a comfortable majority, achieving 60% of the electorate votes cast. This compares with the National Party achieving 55% of party votes. In the 2014 election, she won more than 70% of the electorate votes based on preliminary results. In her first term, she was a member (subsequently deputy chairperson and chairperson) of the Finance and Expenditure Committee, and also chaired the Electoral Legislation Committee that considered legislation to replace the Electoral Finance Act 2007.

In 2009 her Fair Trading (Soliciting on Behalf of Charities) Amendment Bill was drawn from the member's ballot. The bill required fundraising companies to disclose the proportion of funds they passed on to the charities they collect for. The bill passed and became the Fair Trading (Soliciting on Behalf of Charities) Amendment Act 2012.

Adams was made Chairperson of the Finance and Expenditure Committee and the Electoral Legislation Committee for the final months of the 49th Parliament. When the National-led government won a second term in 2011, she was appointed to the Cabinet as Minister of Internal Affairs, Minister for Communications and Information Technology, and Associate Minister for Canterbury Earthquake Recovery. After a reshuffle of cabinet responsibilities caused by the resignation of Nick Smith, Adams was made Minister for the Environment. Chris Tremain succeeded her in the Internal Affairs portfolio.

After National won the 2014 general election in September, Adams became the Minister of Justice, Minister for Courts, Minister of Broadcasting and Minister of Communications. As Minister of Justice, she wiped the convictions of men convicted of homosexual acts prior to the decriminalisation of homosexuality in 1986, and apologised on behalf of the government. Following Bill English's elevation to Prime Minister in 2016, Adams also took on the roles of Minister for Social Housing, Minister Responsible for Social Investment, Minister Responsible for Housing New Zealand and Associate Minister of Finance, in addition to retaining the justice and courts portfolios.

=== Opposition, 2017–2020 ===
Following the formation of a Labour-led coalition government after the 2017 general election, English resigned as party leader and Adams contested the subsequent leadership election. Simon Bridges was elected, with Adams considered the next closest contestant. She became National's finance spokesperson in Bridges' Shadow Cabinet, ranked third in the caucus and served on the Finance and Expenditure and Privileges select committees. On 22 January 2019, Adams was designated as the shadow Attorney-General following the retirement of Chris Finlayson.

In June 2019, Adams announced that she would retire from politics at the 2020 general election, and that she would step down from her party spokesperson roles immediately. She was replaced as National's candidate in Selwyn by journalist Nicola Grigg. While a backbencher, Adams was appointed deputy chair of the committee that considered the Abortion Legislation Bill.

After Todd Muller replaced Bridges as National Party leader in a leadership challenge in May 2020, Adams rescinded her retirement and was given the party's COVID-19 Recovery portfolio and a ranking of 3 in Muller's Shadow Cabinet. On 2 July 2020, Adams assumed the drug reform portfolio from former National Party deputy leader Paula Bennett, who announced that she would be retiring at the upcoming election. As Grigg had already replaced Adams as Selwyn candidate, Adams was to have stood as a list-only candidate in the election but, after Muller was replaced in the leadership by Judith Collins in July, Adams reconfirmed her decision to leave politics. She delivered her valedictory statement on 30 July 2020.

== Later career ==
On 23 September 2021, Labour Health Minister Andrew Little announced that Adams would be among the first people appointed to the board of Health New Zealand, the new health authority being established to replace New Zealand's district health boards. Adams began studying pre-hospital emergency care and is a volunteer ambulance officer.

In September 2021, Adams began a four-year term on the University of Canterbury governing council. She became chancellor of the university in March 2022 and was reappointed for a second term on the council in September 2025. She began as an independent director of the Gas Industry Company in late 2024 and was elected board chair in February 2025.

In October 2025, Adams was appointed as a Crown facilitator at Waitaki District Council working to support the council on its water services delivery plan under Local Water Done Well.

== Political views ==
Adams describes herself as "socially liberal, economically conservative." She considers herself a feminist and supported the Abortion Legislation Act 2020. She has defended abortion on the grounds of women's reproductive rights and urged religious opponents of abortion reform to stop teaching that contraception is a sin. Adams has also voted in favour of legalising same-sex marriage and legalising assisted dying for people with terminal illnesses.

New Zealand Parliament
In abeyance Title last held by David Carter	Member of Parliament for Selwyn; 2008–2020	Succeeded by Nicola Grigg
Political offices
Preceded by Nathan Guy	Minister for Internal Affairs; 2011–2012	Succeeded by Chris Tremain
Preceded by Steven Joyce	Minister for Communications and Information Technology; 2011–2017	Succeeded by Clare Curran
Preceded by Nick Smith	Minister for the Environment; 2012–2014	Succeeded by Nick Smith
Preceded by Chester Borrows	Minister for Courts; 2014–2017	Succeeded by Andrew Little
Preceded by Judith Collins	Minister of Justice; 2014–2017	Succeeded by Andrew Little
