= Pete Hodgson =

New Zealand politician

The Honourable Pete Hodgson
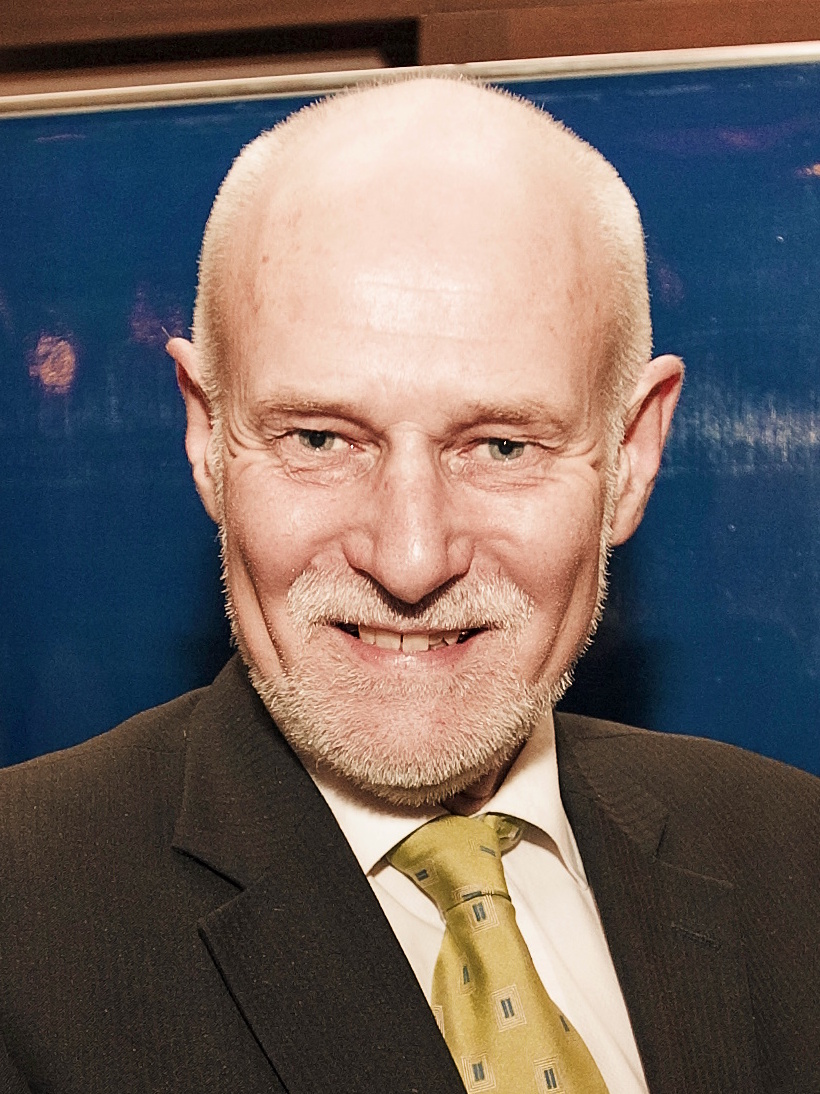
- Pete Hodgson in 2008

36th Minister of Health
- In office 19 October 2005 – 5 November 2007
- Preceded by: Annette King
- Succeeded by: David Cunliffe

21st Minister of Research, Science and Technology
- In office 31 October 2007 – 19 November 2008
- Preceded by: Steve Maharey
- Succeeded by: Wayne Mapp
- In office 10 December 1999 – 21 December 2004
- Preceded by: Maurice Williamson
- Succeeded by: Steve Maharey

8th Minister of Commerce
- In office 21 December 2004 – 19 October 2005
- Prime Minister: Helen Clark
- Preceded by: Margaret Wilson
- Succeeded by: Lianne Dalziel

Member of the New Zealand Parliament for Dunedin North
- In office 27 October 1990 – 2011
- Preceded by: Stan Rodger
- Succeeded by: David Clark
- Majority: 7,155 (2008)

Personal details
- Born: 13 June 1950 (age 76) Whangārei, New Zealand
- Party: Labour
- Children: 2
- Profession: Veterinarian

Peter Colin Hodgson (born 13 June 1950) is a former New Zealand politician of the Labour Party and Member of Parliament for Dunedin North from 1990 to 2011.

== Early life ==
Hodgson was born in Whangārei and received a Bachelor's degree in veterinary science from Massey University. He has worked as a veterinarian, a high school teacher, and a fruit and vegetable retailer.

== Member of Parliament ==
New Zealand Parliament
Years	Term	Electorate	List	Party
1990–1993	43rd	Dunedin North		Labour
1993–1996	44th	Dunedin North		Labour
1996–1999	45th	Dunedin North	30	Labour
1999–2002	46th	Dunedin North	13	Labour
2002–2005	47th	Dunedin North	13	Labour
2005–2008	48th	Dunedin North	12	Labour
2008–2011	49th	Dunedin North	6	Labour

Hodgson joined the Labour Party in 1976, and shortly afterwards became the manager for Stan Rodger's successful campaign in the Dunedin North seat. After holding a number of other Labour Party roles, including that of marginal seats organiser, he was himself nominated to replace Rodger in the 1990 election. He was successful, and became the MP for Dunedin North.

In November 1990 he was appointed as Labour's spokesperson for Science & Technology and Planning by Labour leader Mike Moore.

When the Labour Party formed a government after the 1999 election, Hodgson was appointed to Cabinet. During Labour's nine years in power, Hodgson's portfolios included Economic Development; Tertiary Education; Research, Science and Technology; Health; Transport; Commerce; Land Information; Statistics; Energy (1999–2004); and Fisheries and Forestry. He was also Associate Minister of Health; Industry and Regional Development; and Foreign Affairs.

In 2001, during the filming of The Lord of the Rings movie trilogy in New Zealand, Hodgson was given the title Minister of the Rings, responsible for investigating methods of capitalising on the boom in tourism to New Zealand that followed the release of the films.

In May 2007, Hodgson briefed the Welsh Labour Party's executive on the practicalities of co-operation between Welsh parties outside a formal coalition, after the 2007 Welsh Assembly elections led to a Labour minority government looking likely.

Labour was defeated in the 2008 general election. Hodgson retained his seat with a majority of 7,155.

In opposition, Hodgson was Labour's "chief dirt-digger and mudslinger". The scandals he exposed caused two government ministers to resign.

Hodgson retired from politics at the end of the 49th Parliament in 2011, after 21 years as the MP for Dunedin North. He was succeeded by Labour's David Clark.

== Life after Parliament ==
In 2013, Hodgson was appointed a member of the Representation Commission to determine New Zealand electoral boundaries.

New Zealand Parliament
Preceded by Stan Rodger	Member of Parliament for Dunedin North; 1990–2011	Succeeded by David Clark
Political offices
Preceded by Margaret Wilson	Minister of Commerce; 2004–2005	Succeeded by Lianne Dalziel
Preceded by Paul Swain	Minister for Land Information; 2004–2006	Succeeded by David Parker
Preceded by Annette King	Minister of Health; 2005–2007	Succeeded by David Cunliffe
Preceded by Maurice Williamson	Minister of Research, Science and Technology; 1999–2004 2007–2008	Succeeded by Steve Maharey
Preceded by Steve Maharey	Minister of Research, Science and Technology; 1999–2004 2007–2008	Succeeded by Wayne Mapp
