= Languages of New Zealand =

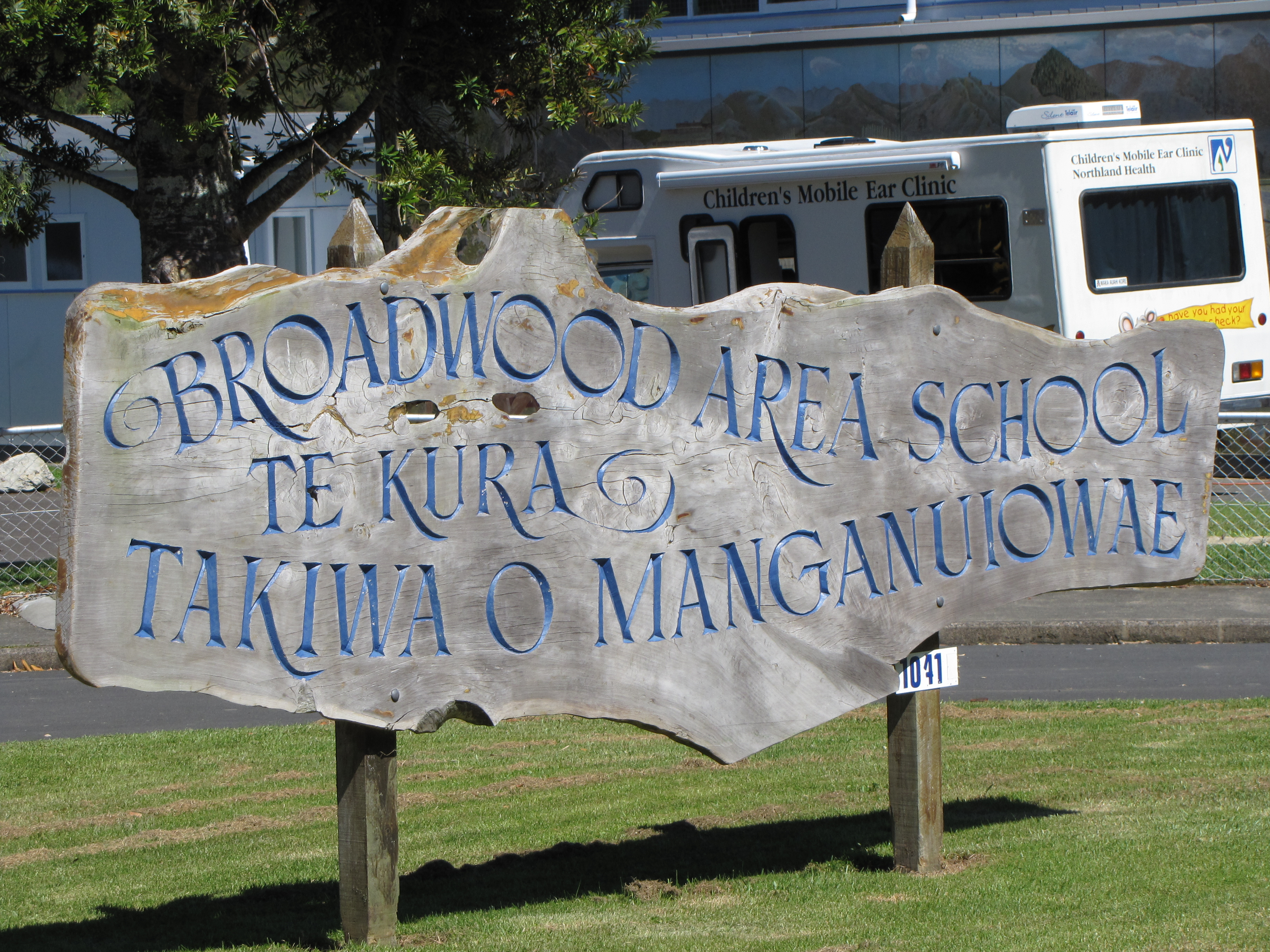
- English and Māori sign in Broadwood
- Official: English; Māori; New Zealand Sign Language
- Main: English
- Indigenous: Māori; Moriori (extinct; ongoing revitalization)
- Vernacular: New Zealand English
- Minority: Samoan 2.2%; Northern Chinese 2.0%; Hindi 1.5%
- Signed: New Zealand Sign Language
- Keyboard layout: QWERTY
- Source: 2018 New Zealand census

English is the predominant language and the primary official language of New Zealand. Almost the entire population speak it either as native speakers or proficiently as a second language. The New Zealand English dialect is most similar to Australian English in pronunciation, with some key differences. The Māori language of the indigenous Māori people was made the first de jure official language in 1987. New Zealand Sign Language (NZSL) has been an official language since 2006. The English language was made an official language in 2026. Many other languages are used by New Zealand's minority immigrant communities.

== Official languages ==
New Zealand has three official languages: English, Māori and New Zealand Sign Language.

Otago law professor Andrew Geddis explained the context of official languages in 2018:

English is already a de facto official language, which may be used in any or all public or official contexts. (...) [W]e legislated te reo [Māori] and sign language as being "official languages", in order to affirmatively grant the right to use them in particular, specified situations where they otherwise could not be used. This is not the case with English. It's simply a general, background cultural presumption in our particular society that this is the language of our government. (...) English is so much an "official language" that our law actually specifies in various places it must be used in place of any other.

=== English ===
English is the most common language, with 95.4 percent of the population having conversational fluency, according to the 2018 census. It has been the dominant language since Pākehā became the majority in the 1860s. It is the primary language used in parliament, government agencies, the courts, and the education system.

English's official status was long presumed rather than codified in statute, in the same manner as in Australia and the United Kingdom. In 2018, New Zealand First MP Clayton Mitchell introduced a bill to parliament to statutorily recognise English as an official language. In 2026 the New Zealand Parliament passed the English Language Act 2026, which recognises English as one of the official languages, codifying a status that had previously existed only de facto. The legislation was widely described as unnecessary and "divisive", and was ridiculed by some commentators.

New Zealand English is mostly non-rhotic with the exception of the "southern burr" found principally in Southland and parts of Otago. It is similar to Australian English and many speakers from the Northern Hemisphere are unable to tell the two accents apart. In New Zealand English the short ⟨i⟩ (as in kit) has become centralised, leading to the shibboleth fish and chips sounding like "fush and chups" to the Australian ear. The words rarely and really, reel and real, doll and dole, pull and pool, witch and which, and full and fill can sometimes be pronounced as homophones. New Zealand English exhibits the near–square merger, so hair, hare, hear and here are sometimes homophones. Some New Zealanders pronounce the past participles grown, thrown and mown using two syllables, whereas groan, throne and moan are pronounced as one syllable. New Zealanders often reply to a question or emphasise a point by adding a rising intonation at the end of the sentence. New Zealand English has also borrowed words and phrases from Māori, such as haka (war dance), kia ora (a greeting), mana (power or prestige), puku (stomach), taonga (treasure) and waka (canoe).

=== Māori ===
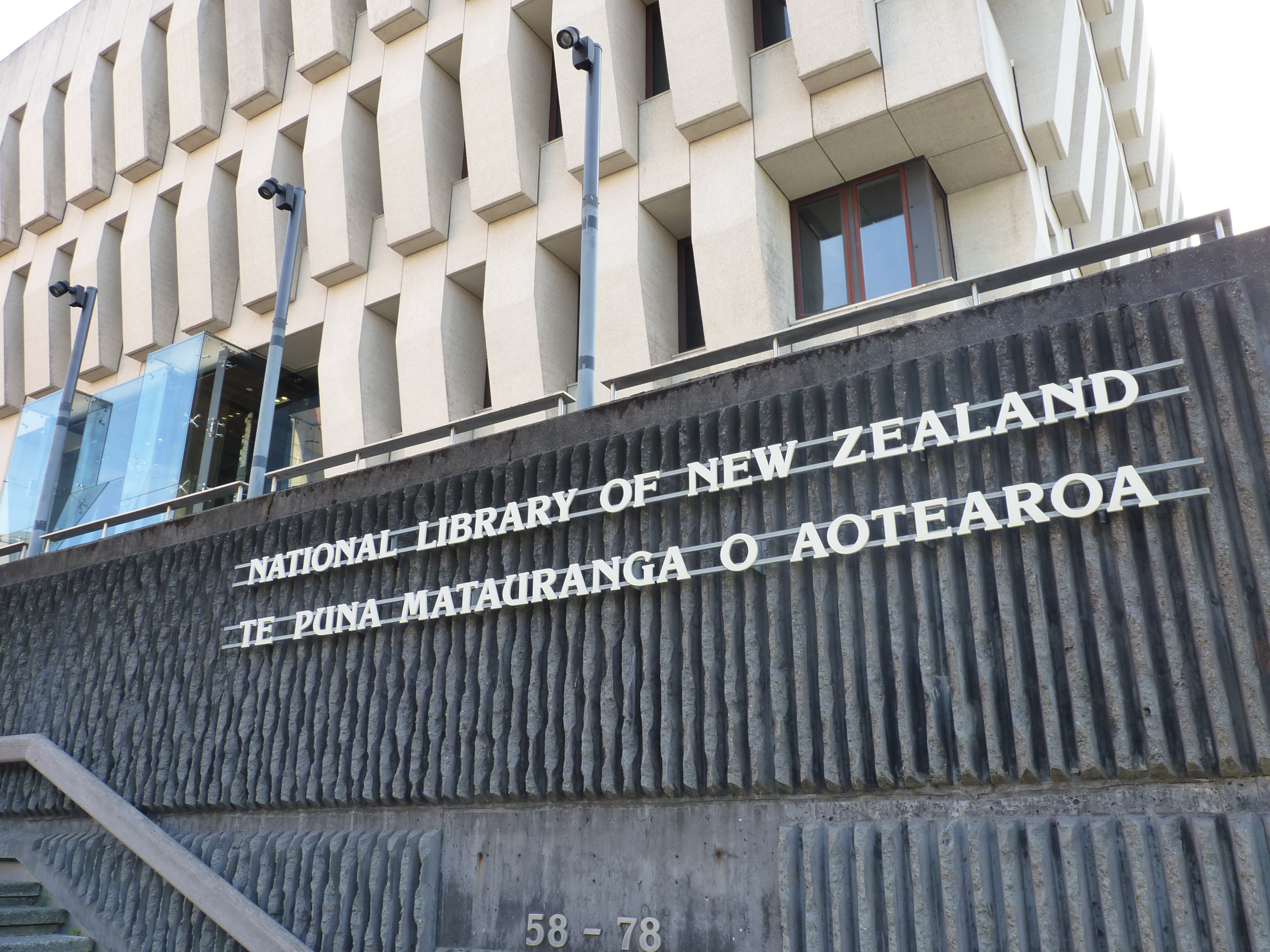
A bilingual sign outside the National Library of New Zealand uses the contemporary Māori name for New Zealand, Aotearoa.

The Māori language of the indigenous Māori people has been an official language by statute since 1987, with rights and obligations to use it defined by the Maori Language Act 1987. It can, for example, be used in legal settings, such as in court, but proceedings are only recorded in English, unless private arrangements are made and agreed by the judge.

An Eastern Polynesian language, Māori is closely related to Tahitian and Cook Islands Māori. After the Second World War, Māori were discouraged from speaking their language in schools and workplaces and it existed as a community language only in a few remote areas. As a consequence of this, many Māori came to view te reo Māori as a language without purpose and chose not to teach their children. Since the 1970s, the language has undergone a process of revitalisation and is spoken by a larger number of people. Of the 185,955 people (4.0 percent of respondents) who claimed they could hold a conversation in Māori in the 2018 census, 86.2 percent identified as Māori, but, conversely, only 18.4 percent of Māori-identifying spoke te reo Māori. It was recorded that in 2014, there were no adult monolingual speakers of Māori.

=== New Zealand Sign Language ===
People who can use New Zealand Sign Language

New Zealand Sign Language, the main language of the deaf community in New Zealand, has been an official language by statute since 2006, by virtue of the New Zealand Sign Language Act 2006. It is legal to use it and have access to it in legal proceedings and government services. In the 2018 census, 22,986 people (0.5%) reported the ability to use New Zealand Sign Language.

== Immigrant languages ==
New Zealand has immigrants from European, Asian and Pacific Island countries who have brought their languages with them. According to Ethnologue (as of 2017), the largest groups are Samoan (86,400), Hindi (66,300), Mandarin Chinese (52,300), French (49,100) and Cantonese (44,600). These minority foreign languages are concentrated in the main cities, particularly Auckland where recent immigrant groups have settled. In the 2018 census, 115,830 respondents who spoke at least one language did not include English as one of their spoken languages.

The number and proportion of multilingual people (those who can speak two or more languages) has continued to increase since the 2001 census. In the 2018 census, the number of multilingual people was 946,275, or 20.6 percent of respondents who spoke at least one language. The highest proportions of multilingual speakers lived in the Auckland (30.9%) and Wellington (21.2%) regions.

== Statistics ==
In the 2023 census, the following languages were reportedly spoken by more than 0.1 percent of the population. People could report more than one language, therefore percentages do not add up to 100. Statistics include those who spoke no language (e.g. too young to talk).

Language	2018 census		2023 census	
Language	Number	%	Number	%
English	4,482,132	95.37	4,750,056	95.12
Māori	185,955	3.96	213,849	4.28
Samoan	101,937	2.17	110,541	2.21
Mandarin	95,253	2.03	107,412	2.15
Hindi	69,471	1.48	77,985	1.56
Tagalog	43,278	0.92	59,517	1.19
Chinese, not further defined	51,501	1.10	58,059	1.16
Cantonese	52,767	1.12	54,417	1.09
French	55,116	1.17	52,884	1.06
Punjabi	34,227	0.73	49,656	0.99
Afrikaans	36,966	0.79	49,041	0.98
Spanish	38,823	0.83	47,004	0.94
German	41,385	0.88	40,092	0.80
Tongan	35,820	0.76	37,752	0.76
Korean	31,323	0.67	32,871	0.66
Fiji Hindi	26,805	0.57	29,406	0.59
New Zealand Sign Language	22,986	0.49	24,678	0.49
Japanese	24,885	0.53	24,432	0.49
Gujarati	22,200	0.47	24,195	0.48
Dutch	23,343	0.50	21,588	0.43
Malayalam	9,024	0.19	14,604	0.29
Portuguese	10,569	0.22	13,926	0.28
Russian	12,543	0.27	13,515	0.27
Arabic	12,399	0.26	13,494	0.27
Tamil	10,107	0.22	12,474	0.25
Sinhala	7,266	0.15	10,479	0.21
Italian	9,903	0.21	10,293	0.21
Thai	9,066	0.19	10,143	0.20
Vietnamese	7,755	0.17	10,002	0.20
Persian	7,002	0.15	9,795	0.20
Urdu	7,824	0.17	9,549	0.19
Malaysian	8,097	0.17	8,673	0.17
Fijian	7,143	0.15	8,439	0.17
Khmer	7,551	0.16	7,854	0.16
Cook Islands Māori	7,833	0.17	7,854	0.16
Bahasa Indonesia	6,282	0.13	6,975	0.14
Telugu	5,754	0.12	6,714	0.13
Min	5,760	0.12	5,775	0.12
Marathi	4,770	0.10	5,523	0.11
Serbo-Croatian	5,502	0.12	5,286	0.11
None (e.g. too young to talk)	101,751	2.17	104,721	2.10
Total respondents	4,699,716	100.00	4,993,923	100.00

=== Regional breakdown ===
According to the 2023 census, English is the most-spoken language in all 67 territorial authority areas in New Zealand. Māori is the second-most spoken language in 57 territorial authority areas. Areas where Māori is not the second-most spoken language are:

- Samoan is the second-most spoken language in Porirua city.
- Mandarin Chinese is the second-most spoken language in Auckland.
- French is the second-most spoken language in Wellington city and the Mackenzie district.
- Tagalog is the second-most spoken language in the Ashburton, Waimate and Southland districts.
- Spanish is the second-most spoken language in the Queenstown-Lakes district
- Afrikaans is the second-most spoken language in the Selwyn district.
- Tongan is the second-most spoken language in the Waitaki district.

== See also ==
- Cook Islands Māori and Pukapukan – spoken in the New Zealand associated state of the Cook Islands
- Moriori language – formerly spoken in New Zealand's Chatham Islands
- Niuean language – spoken in the New Zealand associated state of Niue
- Tokelauan language – spoken in the New Zealand dependent territory of Tokelau
- List of countries and territories where English is an official language

== Bibliography ==
- Crystal, David (2003). The Cambridge Encyclopedia of the English Language (2nd ed.). Cambridge: Cambridge University Press. ISBN 0-521-82348-X.
- Hay, Jennifer; Maclagan, Margaret; Gordon, Elizabeth (2008). Dialects of English: New Zealand English. Edinburgh: Edinburgh University Press. ISBN 9780748625291.
- Kortmann, Bernd; Schneider, Edgar W., eds. (2004). A Handbook of Varieties of English. Vol. 1–2. Together with Kate Burridge, Rajend Mesthrie, and Clive Upton. Berlin: Mouton de Gruyter. ISBN 3-11-017532-0.
- Silva, Diego Barbosa da (2019). "Política Linguística na Oceania: Nas Fronteiras da Colonização e da Globalização / Language Policy in Oceania: In the Frontiers of Colonization and Globalization". Alfa: Revista de Linguística (in Portuguese and English). 63 (2). doi:10.1590/1981-5794-1909-4.
