= Minister of Commerce and Consumer Affairs =

New Zealand minister of the Crown

- Coat of arms of New Zealand

- Flag of New Zealand

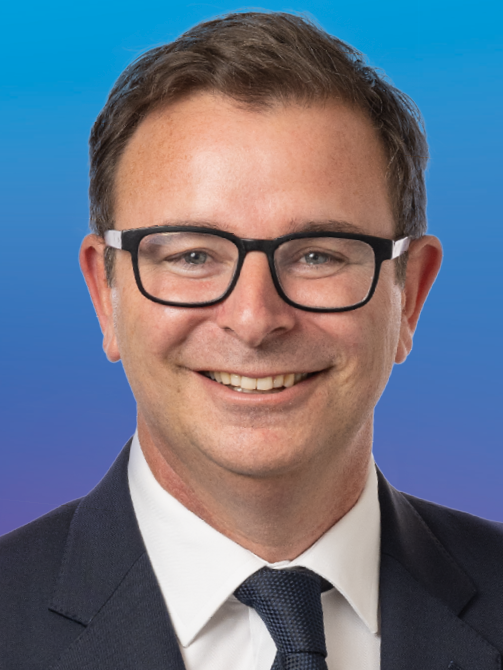
- Incumbent; Cameron Brewer since 7 April 2026
- Ministry of Business, Innovation and Employment
- Style: The Honourable
- Member of: Cabinet of New Zealand; Executive Council
- Reports to: Prime Minister of New Zealand
- Appointer: Governor-General of New Zealand
- Term length: At His Majesty's pleasure
- Formation: 24 August 1987
- First holder: David Butcher
- Salary: $288,900
- Website: www.beehive.govt.nz

The Minister of Commerce and Consumer Affairs is a minister in the New Zealand Government with the responsibilities including corporate law and governance, financial markets, competition policy, consumer policy, protecting intellectual property, and trade policy and international regulatory cooperation, most of which is administered by the Ministry of Business, Innovation and Employment. The position was established as Minister of Commerce in 1987 and superseded the previous office of Minister of Trade and Industry.

Starting from October 2014, the position was combined with the now-disestablished Minister of Consumer Affairs.

The present Minister is Cameron Brewer.

== List of ministers ==
The following ministers held the office of Minister of Commerce and Consumer Affairs.

Key

National Labour

No.	Name	Portrait	Term of Office		Prime Minister
As Minister of Commerce
1	David Butcher		24 August 1987	2 November 1990	Lange
1	David Butcher		24 August 1987	2 November 1990	Palmer
1	David Butcher		24 August 1987	2 November 1990	Moore
2	Philip Burdon		2 November 1990	1 March 1996	Bolger
3	John Luxton		1 March 1996	31 August 1998	Bolger
3	John Luxton		1 March 1996	31 August 1998	Shipley
4	Max Bradford		31 August 1998	10 December 1999	Shipley
5	Paul Swain		10 December 1999	15 August 2002	Clark
6	Lianne Dalziel		15 August 2002	21 February 2004	Clark
7	Margaret Wilson		21 February 2004	21 December 2004	Clark
8	Pete Hodgson		21 December 2004	19 October 2005	Clark
(6)	Lianne Dalziel		19 October 2005	19 November 2008	Clark
9	Simon Power		19 November 2008	12 December 2011	Key
10	Craig Foss		12 December 2011	8 October 2014	Key
As Minister of Commerce and Consumer Affairs
11	Paul Goldsmith		8 October 2014	20 December 2016	Key
11	Paul Goldsmith		8 October 2014	20 December 2016	English
12	Jacqui Dean		20 December 2016	26 October 2017	English
13	Kris Faafoi		26 October 2017	6 November 2020	Ardern
14	David Clark		6 November 2020	1 February 2023	Ardern
14	David Clark		6 November 2020	1 February 2023	Hipkins
15	Duncan Webb		1 February 2023	27 November 2023	Hipkins
16	Andrew Bayly		27 November 2023	24 February 2025	Luxon
17	Scott Simpson		24 February 2025	7 April 2026	Luxon
18	Cameron Brewer		7 April 2026	present	Luxon
