= Health and Disability Commissioner Act 1994 =

Act of Parliament in New Zealand

Health and Disability Commissioner Act

New Zealand Parliament
- Long title: An Act to promote and protect the rights of health consumers and disability services consumers, and, in particular,— a) To secure the fair, simple, speedy, and efficient resolution of complaints relating to infringements of those rights; and (b) To provide for the appointment of a Health and Disability Commissioner to investigate complaints against persons or bodies who provide health care or disability services; and to define the Commissioner's functions and powers; and (c) To provide for the establishment of a Health and Disability Services Consumer Advocacy Service; and (d) To provide for the promulgation of a Code of Health and Disability Services Consumers's Rights; and (e) To provide for matters incidental thereto

Legislative history
- Passed: 1994
- Status: Current legislation

The Health and Disability Commissioner Act is an Act of Parliament passed in New Zealand in 1994. Thus, since 1994, New Zealand has protected the rights of disabled people under the Act including rights to respect, freedom from discrimination and coercion, dignity, communication in a language the resident can understand, information and informed consent, and right of complaint.

== See also ==
- Health care in New Zealand
- Euthanasia in New Zealand
