= Clare Curran =

New Zealand politician

The Honourable Clare Curran
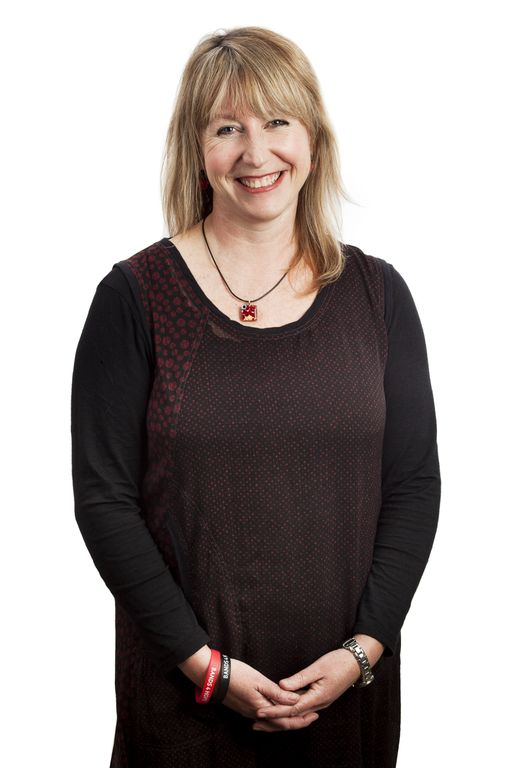

25th Minister of Broadcasting, Communications and Digital Media
- In office 26 October 2017 – 7 September 2018
- Prime Minister: Jacinda Ardern
- Preceded by: Simon Bridges (as Minister for Communications)
- Succeeded by: Kris Faafoi

Minister for Government Digital Services
- In office 26 October 2017 – 24 August 2018
- Prime Minister: Jacinda Ardern
- Preceded by: Office created
- Succeeded by: Megan Woods

Member of the New Zealand Parliament for Dunedin South
- In office 8 November 2008 – 17 October 2020
- Preceded by: David Benson-Pope
- Succeeded by: Electorate abolished
- Majority: 8,717

Personal details
- Born: 1960 (age 65–66) Lower Hutt, New Zealand
- Party: Labour
- Education: Victoria University of Wellington
- Profession: Public relations
- Website: clarecurran.org.nz

Clare Elizabeth Curran (born 1960) is a New Zealand former politician who served as a member of the New Zealand Parliament for Dunedin South from 2008 to 2020. She was the Minister of Broadcasting, Communications, and Digital Media and Associate Minister for the Accident Compensation Corporation in the Sixth Labour Government of New Zealand. Curran retired from politics at the 2020 general election.

== Early life and education ==
Curran grew up and was educated in Dunedin; she attended Moreau College where she achieved School Certificate. She has a BA double major in Anthropology and History from the University of Otago, and BA Honours in Anthropology from Victoria University of Wellington.

During an interview with the University of Otago's student magazine Critic Te Arohi in early March 2020, Curran acknowledged that she had been charged with possession for marijuana during her youth, for which she paid a NZ$50 fine.

== Career ==
Curran worked in communications for Australian unions over a number of years before returning to New Zealand in 2002 with her young family. She continued to work in public relations in Dunedin.

Curran joined the New Zealand Labour Party in 2006. She quickly rose to prominence within the Otago-Southland hierarchy, becoming a member of the Council of the New Zealand Labour Party.

In 2006 Curran presented a paper to the Otago-Southland region of the Labour Party on "capturing the language" on climate change policy.

In May 2006 Curran was appointed to a contractual role within the Ministry for the Environment following a recommendation from Environment Minister David Parker's office to provide communications advice on the Government's climate change strategy. This appointment was the subject of an investigation by the State Services Commission into the appropriateness of Curran's engagement. The report found that the Ministry had failed to adequately identify Curran's conflict of interest with respect to her relationship with Minister Parker. The report found that a staff member in Parker's office had described Curran as Parker's "right-hand woman" and in an email to Environment Ministry Chief Executive Hugh Logan, and recommended that Curran meet with Logan to discuss communications. Logan resigned as Chief Executive of the Ministry hours before the State Services Commission's report into the Curran affair was released.

She is currently a member of many unions and political groups. She is a member of the Engineering, Printing and Manufacturing Union and the Service & Food Workers Union. She is also a member of Greenpeace. She was also on the Council of the New Zealand Labour Party as Otago-Southland regional representative.

After leaving Parliament, Curran was appointed as a member of the University of Otago Council and a director of the Crown company Network 4 Learning. She was previously chair of Life Matters Suicide Prevention Trust (2020–2022) and is currently co-general manager.

== Parliamentary career ==
New Zealand Parliament
Years	Term	Electorate	List	Party
2008–2011	49th	Dunedin South	45	Labour
2011–2014	50th	Dunedin South	28	Labour
2014–2017	51st	Dunedin South	none	Labour
2017–2020	52nd	Dunedin South	23	Labour

=== Fifth National Government, 2008–2017 ===
In 2007, Curran launched a bid to unseat sitting MP David Benson-Pope as the Labour Party candidate for Dunedin South. Curran won the selection contest ahead of Benson-Pope and the Engineering, Printing and Manufacturing Union's Don Pryde. Curran won the 2008 election against National's Conway Powell. However, in 2011, National Party candidate, Jo Hayes, reduced Curran's majority from 6449 in 2008 to 4175 in 2011, and National gained a majority of the party vote in Dunedin South by 1837 votes. In the 2014 election, Curran was successful against National's Hamish Walker.

In the 49th New Zealand Parliament, she was a member of the Commerce Committee and was the Labour spokesperson for Communications and Information Technology.

While in Opposition, Curran spoke out against the closure of public broadcaster TVNZ 7, the Government's controversial move to include software in the Patents Bill, KiwiRail job losses, TV coverage of the Paralympics, and the lack of a telecommunications watchdog in New Zealand. Curran also advocated for the return of rail engineering to the former Hillside Engineering site in South Dunedin and highlighted South Dunedin's vulnerability to extreme weather events and rising sea levels.

=== Labour Coalition Government, 2017–2020 ===
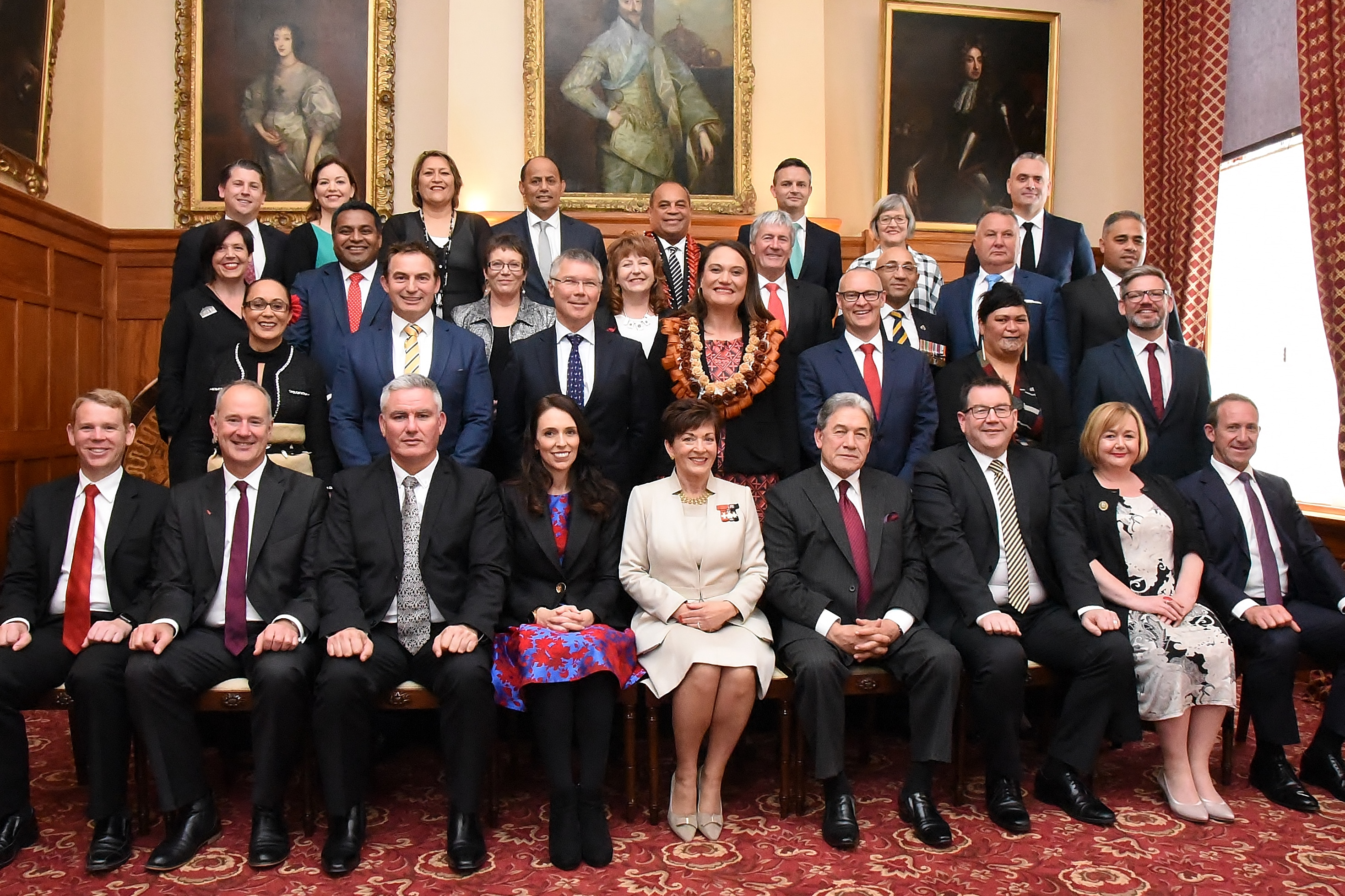
Curran posing with the new Government in 2017

Curran was elected as a Cabinet Minister by the Labour Party caucus following Labour's formation of a coalition government with New Zealand First and the Greens. On 26 October, Curran assumed the portfolios of Minister of Broadcasting, Communications, and Digital Media and Minister for Government Digital Services. In addition, Curran was also allocated the associate portfolios for the Accident Compensation Corporation and the State Services Commission (with responsibility for open government).

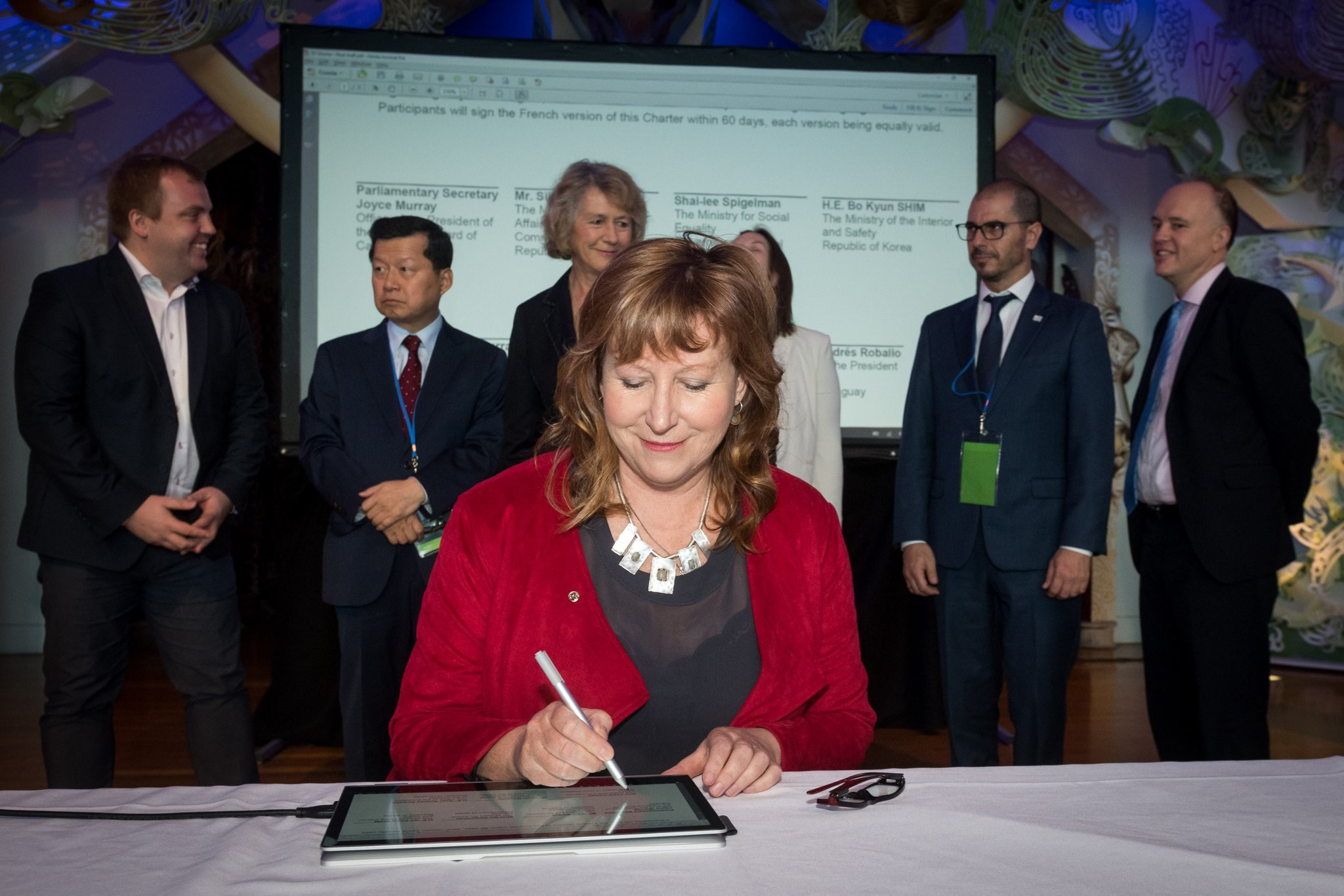
Curran signing the Digital 7 Charter in February 2018

At the 2017 NetHui, Curran publicly proposed as part of her 100-day plan the formation of a chief technology officer (CTO) role for New Zealand Government. As of February 2018, no CTO had been selected despite over 60 candidates expressing interest in the role. Curran commented that "after careful consideration she had decided not to make an appointment at this stage and the search for a suitable candidate would be widened."

In late March 2018, Curran became the subject of media attention after it emerged that she had secretly met with Radio New Zealand broadcaster and senior manager Carol Hirschfeld on 5 December 2017 outside of parliamentary business. Curran initially claimed the meeting was coincidental but later admitted it had been pre-arranged. These revelations led to Hirschfeld's resignation from her position as senior manager at Radio NZ. The meeting was related to the Labour-led government's plans to expand public broadcasting through Radio New Zealand. Curran's actions drew criticism from the National Party's broadcasting spokesperson Melissa Lee, who accused Curran of engaging in a cover-up.

On 24 August 2018, Prime Minister Ardern dismissed Curran from the Cabinet after Curran acknowledged that she had kept a second meeting off the records. In February, Curran had met with tech entrepreneur Derek Handley at her Beehive office to discuss his interest in the vacant Chief Technology Officer role. Curran had failed to disclose the meeting in her ministerial diary and to inform staff or officials about it. Curran apologised to the Prime Minister for her actions and also resigned from her positions as Minister of Government Digital Services and Minister responsible for Open Government. Curran kept her Broadcasting, Communications and Digital Media and associate ACC portfolios.

On 5 September 2018, Curran "appeared flustered" and "stumbled over her answers" when answering questions during question time from opposition National MP Melissa Lee regarding Curran's use of a personal Gmail account for Ministerial use. Two days later Curran resigned as a Minister of Broadcasting and Associate Minister of ACC, saying she could "no longer endure the relentless pressure I've been under."

On 27 August 2019, Curran announced that she would be retiring from Parliament and not seek election at the 2020 general election. As of late August 2019, Curran sits on Parliament's Justice and Electoral select committees. On 2 March 2020, former lawyer, journalist and director of the British Council New Zealand, Ingrid Leary, was nominated as the Labour candidate for Dunedin South to succeed Curran.

Before retiring, Curran told journalist Donna Chisholm in detail about the "toxicity and bullying" she experienced in her political career, and in particular about the pressures she felt during her time as a minister, which culminated in her demotion and resignation. This led to her receiving months of treatment for post-traumatic stress disorder. Curran alleged that, in 2012, Dunedin-based National list MP Michael Woodhouse and other National MPs had taken part in an event where she was mocked with a toilet seat emblazoned with her photo. She gave Chisholm an image of Woodhouse with the seat. Curran also stated that in 2006, before she entered Parliament, National MP Nick Smith had compared her with Joseph Goebbels, and that during their time in Parliament, Jacinda Ardern had been derided for her then childless status by National MPs Maggie Barry and Amy Adams. Barry's remarks in 2012 had received public attention. In addition to naming National MPs who she alleged had engaged in bullying, Curran told Chisholm about an incident with a senior Labour colleague at the end of her first year in Parliament, who she did not name. This colleague she described as telling her that she was "a victim, a femme fatale, and that [she] used [her] sexuality as a weapon." When asked for comment on the toilet seat allegation by the New Zealand Herald, Woodhouse responded "To be honest I cannot really remember it, and I don't think an eight-year-old photo is a burning issue of the day." The independent MP Jami-Lee Ross, who left the National Party in a high-profile incident that included accusations of bullying against him, and who himself had dealt with mental health issues, apologised to Curran for the tactics of his former party.

== After Parliament ==
Shortly after leaving Parliament, Curran studied an English course at the University of Otago and began to write a crime novel. She is chair of Dunedin Night Shelter Trust, a member of the University of Otago Council and a director of Crown company Network for Learning.

== Public profile and views ==
As a Member of Parliament, Curran lobbied for the return of heavy rail engineering work to Hillside Engineering in South Dunedin, climate change adaptation and mitigation in the South Dunedin and Taieri Plain, and placing Dunedin on the priority list for state housing assistance. She also helped secure visas for the parents of Nisha Vijayan, a nurse at the Dunedin Hospital whose husband had died unexpectedly. In June 2011, Curran was sent out of Parliament for wearing a rugby shirt in the Otago rugby union team Highlanders' blue, gold, and maroon colours in protest of their new lime green colour.

New Zealand Parliament
Preceded by David Benson-Pope	Member of Parliament for Dunedin South; 2008–2020	Succeeded by Constituency abolished
Political offices
Preceded by Simon Bridges as Minister for Communications	Minister of Broadcasting, Communications and Digital Media; 2017–2018	Succeeded by Kris Faafoi
New office	Minister for Government Digital Services; 2017–2018	Succeeded by Megan Woods
