= Clayton Mitchell (New Zealand politician) =

New Zealand politician

Member of the New Zealand Parliament for List
- In office 20 September 2014 – 17 October 2020

Personal details
- Born: 1971 or 1972 (age 54–55)
- Spouse: Erika
- Children: 3

Clayton Robert Henry Mitchell is a former New Zealand politician. He was elected to the New Zealand parliament at the 2014 general election as a representative of New Zealand First and served two terms, leaving Parliament in 2020.

== Background ==
During the 1990s, Mitchell was convicted of assault after refusing a gang member entry to a bar he owned. He received a suspended sentence for this and a fine. Mitchell also was convicted for dangerous driving, and was convicted for allowing customers to drink at his pub outside of the licensed hours.

For these and other incidents, Mitchell's license to run a bar was suspended in 1998. He did not attend the hearing, and was in Australia at the time. His license was reinstated in 2000. A bar run by Mitchell was investigated in 2008 by gambling authorities regarding possible underage gambling on pokie machines, leading to authorities imposing conditions on the pub's license. Another pub run by Mitchell was shut down for a week following a promotion allowing unlimited drinks for a fixed price. Mitchell has stated that he is "proud of my record in the hospitality industry, and the success I achieved in it."

Mitchell has been chair of the Waikato-Bay of Plenty Hospitality Association.

== Political career ==
New Zealand Parliament
Years	Term	Electorate	List	Party
2014–2017	51st	List	6	NZ First
2017–2020	52nd	List	6	NZ First

In 2013, Mitchell was elected to the Tauranga City Council, representing the Mt Maunganui/Papamoa Ward.

In 2014, Mitchell was elected to parliament after being ranked 6th on the New Zealand First party list at the general election. He had also unsuccessfully stood in the Tauranga electorate.

In February 2018, Mitchell proposed a member's bill to Parliament to make English an official language of New Zealand. As of May 2020, the bill has not progressed. In 2026, New Zealand First would pass the English Language Act 2026 which made English an official language of New Zealand in the Sixth National Government of New Zealand.

Mitchell has sat on the select committees for: Business; Economic Development, Science and Innovation: Officers of Parliament; and Standing Orders. He has served as New Zealand First's whip.

Mitchell led a 'Respecting New Zealand Values' campaign, seeking to require new immigrants agree to hold certain values. The proposed bill would have required migrants to sign agree to a cultural "code of conduct" and could expel them from New Zealand if they breached it.

In October 2019, Mitchell was involved in an incident at a Tauranga bar, where he and his party were removed from the premises by security. A security guard said that Mitchell was asked repeatedly to move from an area where bar staff needed to pass through, and accidentally hit a member of staff in the head with a glass. Mitchell denied this, saying the accusations were a politically motivated attack and that he was the victim. NZ First leader Winston Peters promised a showing of the bar's security footage, saying that it would exonerate Mitchell. The video was never released; Peters later said he had not seen the video but he had been told of its content by someone he had "enormous trust" in.

In November 2019, Mitchell was reported to be involved in the controversial NZ First Foundation. Between 2017 and 2019, New Zealand First party officials had allegedly channelled half a million dollars of donations into the NZ First Foundation's bank account to cover various party-related expenses such as the party's headquarters, graphic design, an MP's legal advice, and even a $5000 day at the Wellington races. The amount of donations deposited into the foundation and used by the party was at odds with its official annual returns. A party source stated that board members were instructed to pass on large donations to Mitchell who acted as the fundraiser for the party, saying "everybody was instructed to find donors and, if they had a big donor, Mitchell would handle them."

In June 2020 Mitchell announced that he would stand down at the 2020 election. He gave a valedictory speech in July 2020 where he reiterated his political goals "such as fixing the Resource Management Act, building roads, pushing for a single standard of citizenship for all New Zealanders, stopping the wholesale selling off of our State assets, building better internal capabilities for manufacturing and processing to add value to our exports to create wealth for Kiwis, and, of course, controlling immigration." He also recounted a story where he was mistaken for National MP Mark Mitchell and was phoned by someone saying he had support of the National caucus in the party's leadership challenge. Mitchell said that he replied "You should be calling Winston. He'd be a great leader for you guys."

As of 2022, he is no longer a member of the New Zealand First party.
