= Duncan Webb =

New Zealand politician

The Honourable Duncan Webb MP
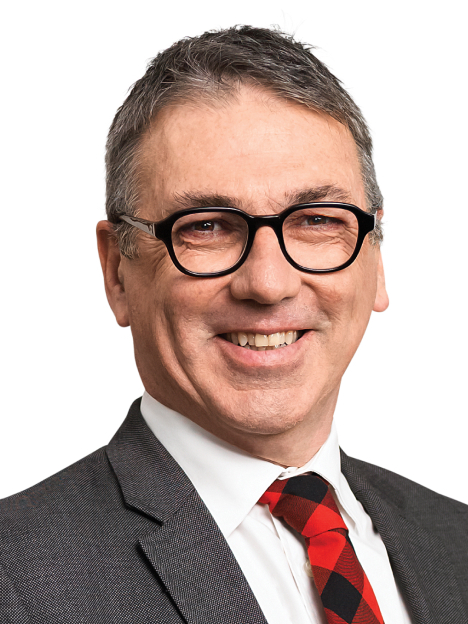
- Webb in 2023

17th Minister for State Owned Enterprises
- In office 1 February 2023 – 27 November 2023
- Prime Minister: Chris Hipkins
- Preceded by: David Clark
- Succeeded by: Paul Goldsmith

15th Minister of Commerce and Consumer Affairs
- In office 1 February 2023 – 27 November 2023
- Prime Minister: Chris Hipkins
- Preceded by: David Clark
- Succeeded by: Andrew Bayly

Member of the New Zealand Parliament for Christchurch Central
- Incumbent
- Assumed office 23 September 2017
- Preceded by: Nicky Wagner
- Majority: 14,098

Personal details
- Born: 1967 England
- Party: Labour (1999–present)
- Children: 3
- Education: University of Canterbury
- Profession: Lawyer
- Website: Labour Party profile

Duncan Alexander Webb (born 1967) is a New Zealand politician, lawyer and academic. He was a law professor at the University of Canterbury from 2000 to 2008, then became a partner at law firm Lane Neave. He was elected as a member of the New Zealand House of Representatives for Christchurch Central, representing the Labour Party, in the 2017 general election.

He was Chief Government Whip, Minister of Commerce and Consumer Affairs and Minister for State Owned Enterprises in the Sixth Labour Government.

== Early life and career ==
Webb moved to Christchurch from London in 1974 when he was six years old. His father had attended Bible college before becoming a pastor at the Māori Evangelical Fellowship Church in Wainoni. After briefly living in Aranui, Webb's family moved to South Brighton where he grew up along with his four siblings.

He attended Shirley Boys' High School and left before finishing his final year, proceeding directly to the University of Canterbury to study law. Webb graduated Bachelor of Laws with Honours in 1989 before being awarded a Doctor of Laws in 2007.

Webb currently lives in Christchurch. He lectured in law at Massey University and Victoria University in Wellington for eight years before being appointed as a professor at University of Canterbury in 2000. He continued in that role until 2008. before joining Lane Neave. He also held visiting academic fellowships at the University of Exeter (1999) and the University of Cincinnati (2003), and was a Bell Gully University Fellow from 2001 to 2003.

Webb has also worked for the Public Interest Project, which seeks to get innocent people out of jail, and for the Howard League, which promotes prisoners’ rights. He is a long-time member of the Labour party, joining in 1999. He has three sons. He split from his wife, Tania, in 2016.

== Member of Parliament ==
New Zealand Parliament
Years	Term	Electorate	List	Party
2017–2020	52nd	Christchurch Central	43	Labour
2020–2023	53rd	Christchurch Central	43	Labour
2023–2026	54th	Christchurch Central	20	Labour

A long-time member of the Labour Party, Webb was Brendon Burns' campaign chairman during the 2011 election when Burns lost Christchurch Central to National candidate Nicky Wagner. Labour had failed to regain the seat in the 2014 election and Webb was selected as the party's candidate for the 2017 election. Webb's campaign chair was the former mayor of Christchurch Garry Moore. Webb defeated Wagner by 2,871 votes. After the election, Labour formed a coalition government with New Zealand First and the Green Party.

=== First term, 2017–2020 ===
In Webb's first term of Parliament, he served on various select committees including Regulations Review (2017–2020), Foreign Affairs, Defence and Trade (2017–2018), Justice (2018–2019), Finance and Expenditure (2017–2020) and Environment (as chair, 2019–2020). Webb's first member's bill, the Fair Trading (Oppressive Contracts) Amendment Bill, was introduced in March 2018 but was discharged that May without a first reading.

=== Second term, 2020–2023 ===
During the 2020 New Zealand general election, Webb was re-elected in Christchurch Central, defeating National candidate Dale Stephens by 14,098 votes. On 2 November 2020, following the election, he became one of three junior whips for the Labour Party and was also appointed chair of the Finance and Expenditure select committee. After a June 2022 Cabinet reshuffle, in which senior whip Kieran McAnulty became a minister, Webb was promoted to senior whip.

A private Bill on behalf of the Girl Guides Association (New Zealand branch), which was concerned with the disposition of property held by the association in Waitākere, was introduced by Webb in 2021. However, the social services committee recommended it not proceed. Webb's second member's bill, the Companies (Directors Duties) Amendment Bill, was introduced to the House on 23 September 2021. The purpose of the Bill is to make it clear that company directors can take actions that take into account wider matters other than the company's finances.

On 31 January 2023, prime minister Chris Hipkins announced a Cabinet reshuffle, in which Webb was appointed a Minister outside of Cabinet, with the portfolios of commerce and consumer affairs and state owned enterprises. He held these positions until the government left office in November 2023. As commerce minister, Webb took responsibility for work regulating the supermarket industry. He appointed the first New Zealand Grocery Commissioner and instituted unit pricing regulations. With finance minister Grant Robertson, he announced a market study of the banking sector. As minister for state owned enterprises, he instituted reviews into KiwiRail disruptions and weather forecasting.

=== Third term, 2023–present ===
Webb was re-elected in Christchurch Central for a third time in October 2023, defeating Dale Stephens by a decreased margin of 1,841 votes. He is currently the Deputy Shadow Leader of the House and holds the justice, regulation, Earthquake Commission, and Christchurch Issues portfolios in the Shadow Cabinet of Chris Hipkins.

On 5 December 2023, Webb was granted retention of the title The Honourable, in recognition of his term as a member of the Executive Council.

Following a shadow cabinet reshuffle on 7 March 2025, Webb lost his Christchurch Issues portfolio but retained his other portfolios. On 21 October 2025, Webb announced that he would retire from politics at the 2026 New Zealand general election.

On 25 November, Webb lodged a member's bill to repeal the Regulatory Standards Act 2025, and reiterated the party's commitment to repealing the legislation within its first 100 days of forming a new government if it won the 2026 general election.

In May 2026, Webb was part of a cross-party delegation of four New Zealand MPs including Maureen Pugh, David Wilson and Laura McClure who visited Taiwan, meeting with Taiwanese legislators and foreign ministry officials. In response, the Chinese government in early June 2026 banned the four from visiting China, Hong Kong and Macau for a year on the grounds that their actions violated the One China policy. The Chinese Embassy in New Zealand stated that their travel ban could be waived if they apologised for their actions. In response, Webb said that New Zealand valued democratic institutions and the right to engage with international partners, stating "If the cost of doing that is to be excluded from China for a year, I will pay that price."

== Political positions ==
In his maiden speech, Webb identified himself as a socialist. He voted in favour of the End of Life Choice Bill in 2019 and Abortion Legislation Bill in 2020.

=== Treaty of Waitangi ===
Dr Webb has stated that the Treaty of Waitangi is a fundamental part of New Zealand law, emphasising the importance of recognising and accepting the principles of the Treaty as integral to the nation's legal framework.

=== Social justice ===
Webb consistently advocates for government action to support those in need and for policies that promote a high-wage, low-carbon economy, reflecting his broader commitment to social justice and long-term planning for New Zealand’s future.

=== Climate change ===
As an MP and minister, Webb has played key roles in advancing climate change legislation and resource management reform, advocating for policies that balance economic growth with environmental sustainability.

=== Palestinian advocacy ===
Webb has also defended the Boycott, Divestment and Sanctions campaign as a form of non-violent protest against Israeli policies towards the Palestinians. In early June 2018, Webb also presented a petition on behalf of Palestinian solidarity activist Donna Miles that asked Parliament to request the New Zealand Superannuation Fund to divest from "illegal" Israeli settlements in the West Bank. In August 2018, Webb hosted a meeting with Unite Union Director Mike Treen, who participated in the International Freedom Flotilla's attempt that year to breach the Israeli blockade of the Gaza Strip. Webb's Palestinian activism has drawn criticism from Zionist advocacy groups including the Israel Institute of New Zealand (IINZ), the Australia/Israel & Jewish Affairs Council (AIJAC), and the New Zealand Jewish Council.

On 11 May 2021, Webb and 16 other New Zealand Members of Parliament donned keffiyeh to mark World Keffiyeh Day.

Despite his vocal support for the Palestinians, Webb expressed disagreement with the use of the controversial chant "From the river to the sea, Palestine will be free." The chant has been alleged to be associated with anti-Semitism and support for Hamas. Following controversy around Green MP Chlöe Swarbrick's use of the phrase during a Palestinian solidarity rally held in response to the Gaza war in November 2023, Webb said "he didn't participate if the chant started at rallies he attended."

In early August 2024, Webb attracted controversy after posting an Instagram video where he spoke at a rally where protesters chanted "Hey, Luxon, what do you say? How many kids did you kill today?." Webb also gave a speech denouncing the "demonisation" of Palestinians, alleged "Israeli apartheid," and calling for an end to the Gaza war. While Labour leader Chris Hipkins initially defended Webb, he subsequently expressed disagreement with the chants used during the protest. In response, National Party leader and Prime Minister Luxon denounced Webb's behaviour as "beyond the pale" and labelled Hipkins a hypocrite for not taking stronger action against Webb.

New Zealand Parliament
Preceded by Nicky Wagner	Member of Parliament for Christchurch Central; 2017–present	Incumbent
Political offices
Preceded by David Clark	Minister for State Owned Enterprises; 2023	Succeeded by Paul Goldsmith
Preceded by David Clark	Minister of Commerce and Consumer Affairs; 2023	Succeeded by Andrew Bayly
Party political offices
Preceded by Kieran McAnulty	Senior Whip of the Labour Party; 2022–2023	Succeeded by Tangi Utikere
