= Minister for Media and Communications =

New Zealand minister of the Crown

- Coat of arms of New Zealand

- Flag of New Zealand

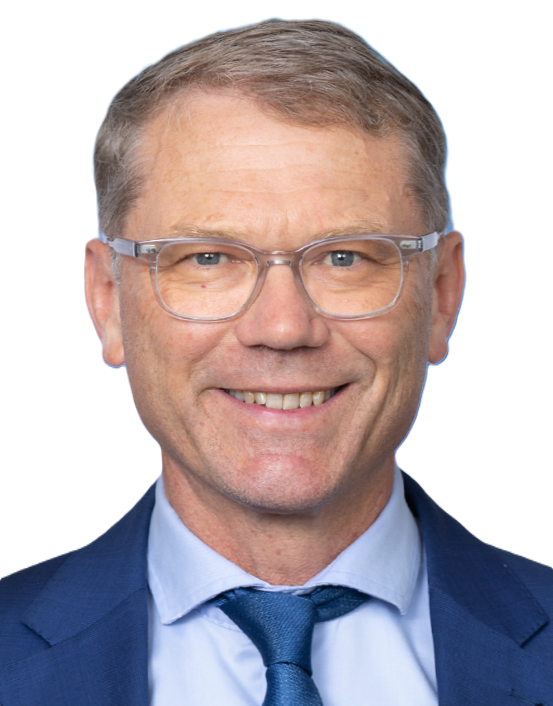
- Incumbent; Paul Goldsmith since 24 April 2024
- Television New Zealand; Radio New Zealand
- Style: The Honourable
- Member of: Executive Council
- Reports to: Prime Minister of New Zealand
- Appointer: Governor-General of New Zealand
- Term length: At His Majesty's pleasure
- Formation: 1 July 1936 (as Minister of Broadcasting)
- First holder: Michael Joseph Savage
- Salary: $288,900

The Minister for Media and Communications (Note: The portfolio was previously Minister of Broadcasting, Minister of Broadcasting, Communications and Digital Media and Minister of Broadcasting and Media.) is a minister in the New Zealand Government with responsibility for the government's broadcasting and media policies, including the diversity and accessibility of broadcast content, broadcasting standards, the regulation of the print media, and the oversight of state media corporations TVNZ and Radio New Zealand. The current Minister is Paul Goldsmith, a member of the National Party.

== History ==
In 1936 the First Labour Government decided that broadcasting would be run by the state. As a result a government minister in charge of Broadcasting was appointed and new legislation (the Broadcasting Act 1936) was passed that abolished the existing New Zealand Broadcasting Board and established the new National Broadcasting Service in its place. A Director of Broadcasting was appointed and a Broadcasting Advisory Council formed as a result of the act to advise the minister. The Labour Party had specifically sought to broadcast parliamentary debates via radio as a means of allowing the public to listen and make their own judgment of events, rather than relying solely on the press, whom Labour were distrustful of.

Later the minister oversaw the introduction of television into New Zealand and became responsible for the New Zealand Broadcasting Corporation (NZBC).

Between December 2016 and October 2017, the broadcasting portfolio was disestablished, with portfolio responsibilities shared between the Minister for Communications and Minister for Arts, Culture and Heritage. The position was recreated from October 2017 with a title change reflecting a broader scope. The Minister is advised by officials from the Ministry for Culture and Heritage and the Ministry of Business, Innovation and Employment.

Under the Sixth Labour Government, the focus of the portfolio was on creating a new Aotearoa New Zealand Public Media entity which would have been formed by merging TVNZ and Radio New Zealand into a single state broadcaster. The plan was later scrapped.

== List of ministers ==
The following ministers have held the office of Minister of Broadcasting.

Key

Labour National

| No. | Name | Portrait | Term of Office | | Prime Minister |
As Minister of Broadcasting
| 1 | Michael Joseph Savage | | 1 July 1936 | 27 March 1940 | Savage |
| 2 | Peter Fraser | | 27 March 1940 | 21 January 1941 | Fraser |
| 3 | David Wilson | | 21 January 1941 | 8 April 1944 | Fraser |
| 4 | Fred Jones | | 8 April 1944 | 13 December 1949 | Fraser |
| 5 | Frederick Doidge | | 13 December 1949 | 19 September 1951 | Holland |
| 6 | Ronald Algie | | 19 September 1951 | 12 December 1957 | Holland |
| 6 | Ronald Algie | | 19 September 1951 | 12 December 1957 | Holyoake |
| 7 | Ray Boord | | 12 December 1957 | 12 December 1960 | Nash |
| 8 | Arthur Kinsella | | 12 December 1960 | 20 December 1963 | Holyoake |
| 9 | Jack Scott | | 20 December 1963 | 15 February 1967 | Holyoake |
| 10 | Lance Adams-Schneider | | 15 February 1967 | 22 December 1969 | Holyoake |
| 11 | Bert Walker | | 22 December 1969 | 8 December 1972 | Holyoake |
| 11 | Bert Walker | | 22 December 1969 | 8 December 1972 | Marshall |
| 12 | Roger Douglas | | 8 December 1972 | 12 December 1975 | Kirk |
| 12 | Roger Douglas | | 8 December 1972 | 12 December 1975 | Rowling |
| 13 | Hugh Templeton | | 12 December 1975 | 12 February 1981 | Muldoon |
| 14 | Warren Cooper | | 12 February 1981 | 11 December 1981 | Muldoon |
| 15 | Ian Shearer | | 11 December 1981 | 26 July 1984 | Muldoon |
| 16 | Jonathan Hunt | | 26 July 1984 | 24 August 1987 | Lange |
| 17 | Richard Prebble | | 24 August 1987 | 4 November 1988 | Lange |
| - | David Lange acting minister | | 4 November 1988 | 8 November 1988 | Lange |
| (16) | Jonathan Hunt | | 8 November 1988 | 2 November 1990 | Lange |
| (16) | Jonathan Hunt | | 8 November 1988 | 2 November 1990 | Palmer |
| (16) | Jonathan Hunt | | 8 November 1988 | 2 November 1990 | Moore |
| 18 | Maurice Williamson | | 2 November 1990 | 10 December 1999 | Bolger |
| 18 | Maurice Williamson | | 2 November 1990 | 10 December 1999 | Shipley |
| 19 | Marian Hobbs | | 10 December 1999 | 23 February 2001 | Clark |
| - | Steve Maharey acting minister | | 23 February 2001 | 27 March 2001 | Clark |
| (19) | Marian Hobbs | | 27 March 2001 | 15 August 2002 | Clark |
| 20 | Steve Maharey | | 15 August 2002 | 5 November 2007 | Clark |
| 21 | Trevor Mallard | | 5 November 2007 | 19 November 2008 | Clark |
| 22 | Jonathan Coleman | | 19 November 2008 | 14 December 2011 | Key |
| 23 | Craig Foss | | 14 December 2011 | 8 October 2014 | Key |
| 24 | Amy Adams | | 8 October 2014 | 20 December 2016 | Key |
| | No separate appointments | | 20 December 2016 | 26 October 2017 | English |
As Minister of Broadcasting, Communications and Digital Media
| 25 | Clare Curran | | 26 October 2017 | 7 September 2018 | Ardern |
As Minister of Broadcasting and Media
| 26 | Kris Faafoi | | 7 September 2018 | 14 June 2022 | Ardern |
| 27 | Willie Jackson | | 14 June 2022 | 27 November 2023 | Ardern |
| 27 | Willie Jackson | | 14 June 2022 | 27 November 2023 | Hipkins |
As Minister for Media and Communications
| 28 | Melissa Lee | | 27 November 2023 | 24 April 2024 | Luxon |
| 29 | Paul Goldsmith | | 24 April 2024 | present | Luxon |

== See also ==
- Television in New Zealand
- Radio in New Zealand

== Works cited ==
- Wilson, Jim (1985) [First published in 1913]. New Zealand Parliamentary Record, 1840–1984 (4th ed.). Wellington: V.R. Ward, Govt. Printer. OCLC 154283103.
