= Sharyn Kay Cederman =

New Zealand feminist and banker (1948–2000)

- Born: 23 May 1948; Motueka, New Zealand
- Died: 17 January 2000 (aged 51); Melbourne, Australia
- Burial place: Riwaka Cemetery, New Zealand
- Education: University of Auckland; University of Hawaiʻi; University of Queensland
- Occupations: Feminist and banker
- Children: 2

Sharyn Kay Cederman (1948–2000) was a New Zealand-born feminist and banker. She co-founded a feminist journal and edited one of the founding texts of the New Zealand women's liberation movement, Sexist Society (1972). Her United Nations positions included founding member of the United Nations Development Fund for Women Australia, followed by president of the United Nations Development Fund for Women New Zealand.

== Biography ==
Sharyn Kay Cederman was born on 23 May 1948 in Motueka, New Zealand, as the oldest of three children. Her parents were master builder John Cederman and his wife, farm worker and office clerk Eunice Margaret Dickie. The family lived on the country's South Island, where Sharyn was prefect at Motueka High School and participated in swimming and hockey. She enrolled at Victoria University of Wellington in 1966, and studied natural sciences before changing her major to commerce and administration. In 1970, she left the university before graduation to take a promising job offer in banking.

=== Feminist ===
Cederman was a pioneer of the women's liberation movement in New Zealand. Working in her university student unions led to her 1971 speech in Auckland announcing (from an upturned beer crate in Vulcan Lane) the formation of the National Organisation for Women in New Zealand. The next year, she helped found the city's own Women's Liberation Group. With the backing of that organisation, she challenged the legality of men-only public bars and picketed beauty pageants. She was a founder of the feminist journal Broadsheet and co-edited with Sue Kedgley a best seller and one of the founding texts of the New Zealand women's liberation movement, Sexist Society (1972).

As a promoter of health care for women, she was responsible for a "controversial tour" of the country by American self-help activist Lorraine Rothman. During the years when abortions in New Zealand were criminalized, Cederman was active in the country's Abortion Law Reform Association and Sisters Overseas Service. The latter was an underground grassroots group in the 1970s and early 1980s that helped women who needed an abortion get the procedure legally in Australia when they could not obtain one safely in New Zealand.

=== Banker ===
In 1972, Cederman was working as an assistant manager at Merbank when she learned that the company "did not permit" female employees to advance to higher-level positions. She left the bank and enrolled at the University of Auckland (BCom, 1977), where she met and married architect Edward Robert Haysom in June 1978. They moved to Hawaii, where their twins, Timothy and Miles, were born in 1980. That same year, Cederman graduated from the University of Hawaii (MBA, 1980). She was hired as a lecturer for a year at Chaminade University of Honolulu before the family moved to Brisbane, Australia. Cederman and her husband divorced in the late 1980s.

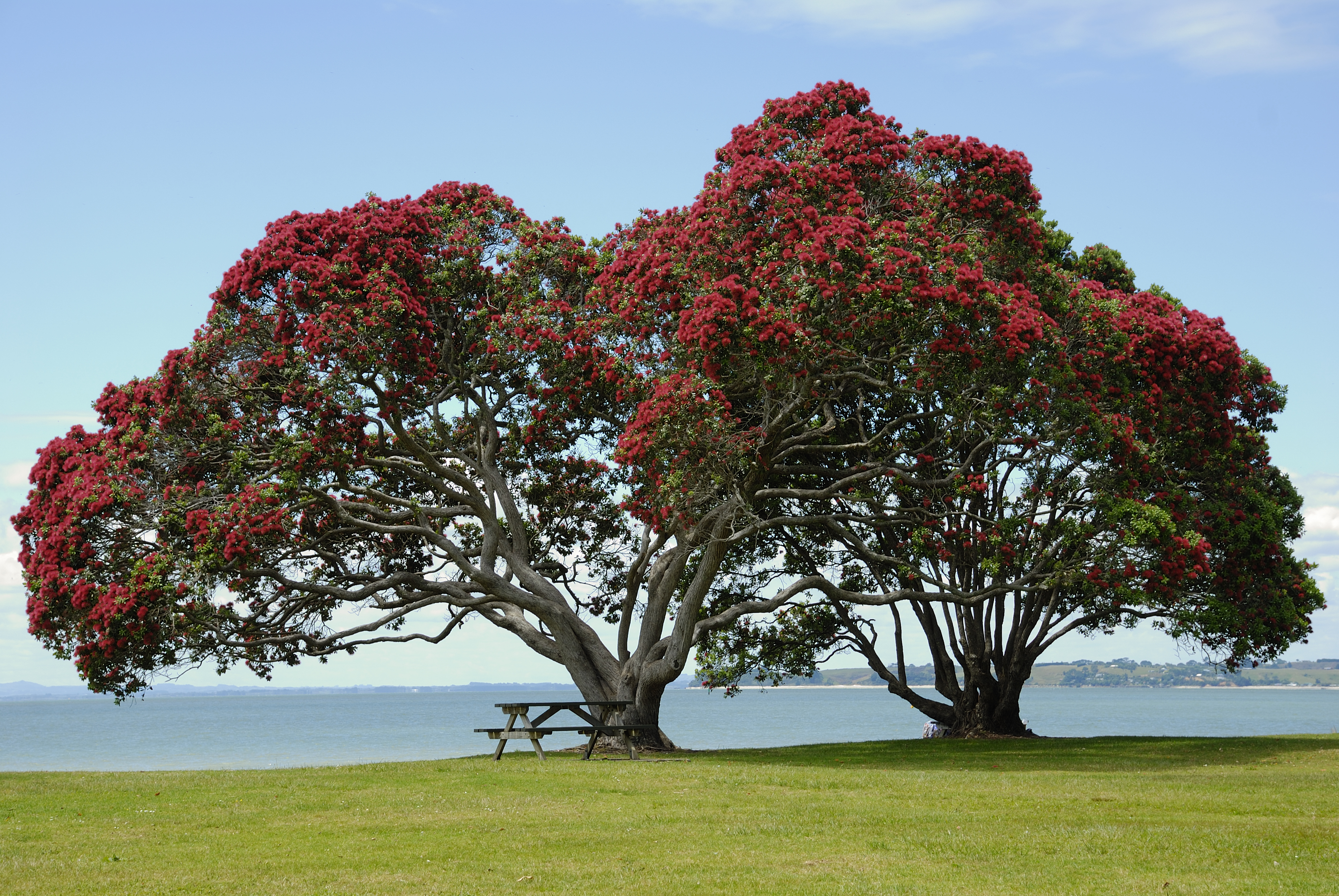
The endangered Pōhutukawa trees at Cornwallis Beach.

In Brisbane, Cederman joined the doctoral program in marketing at the University of Queensland. At the same time, she worked for an insurance company before accepting an offer at Advance Bank in Sydney, Australia, to be the director of strategic planning.

When Cederman returned to New Zealand, she was named chief manager of marketing services at Westpac Bank. In that role, she decided to expand the bank's social licence through community efforts to save the endangered Pōhutukawa tree. However, her work with Westpac was suspended in 1995 after she revealed her rare bone cancer diagnosis of myelofibrosis to company officials. She was later demoted. In response, she brought a lawsuit against the Bank and she accepted an out-of-court settlement agreeing to resign in 1999. She then took a voluntary position with the Bone Marrow Donor Institute.

Cederman chose to have a risky bone marrow transplant in 1999, but it was not successful. She entered a coma during her recovery and never emerged. She died at the Alfred Hospital in Melbourne, Australia, on 17 January 2000 at 51, and was buried in Riwaka Cemetery, New Zealand, near her father.

=== Advocate ===
Over the years, Cederman's efforts on behalf of women led to appointments to two United Nations positions. She became a founding member of the United Nations Development Fund for Women Australia in 1991. After that, she took over as president of the United Nations Development Fund for Women (UNIFEM) New Zealand.

=== Legacy ===
Cederman co-edited the book Sexist Society with Sue Kedgley in 1972.

== See also ==
- Abortion in New Zealand
