= Abortion Law Reform Association of New Zealand =

National pro-choice advocacy group in New Zealand

The Abortion Law Reform Association of New Zealand (ALRANZ) is New Zealand's national abortion-rights advocacy group in existence since 1971. Since the decriminalisation of abortion in 2020, the organisation continues to monitor and lobby for changes to the law. The organisation is based in Wellington, publishes a quarterly newsletter, and has its own web site.

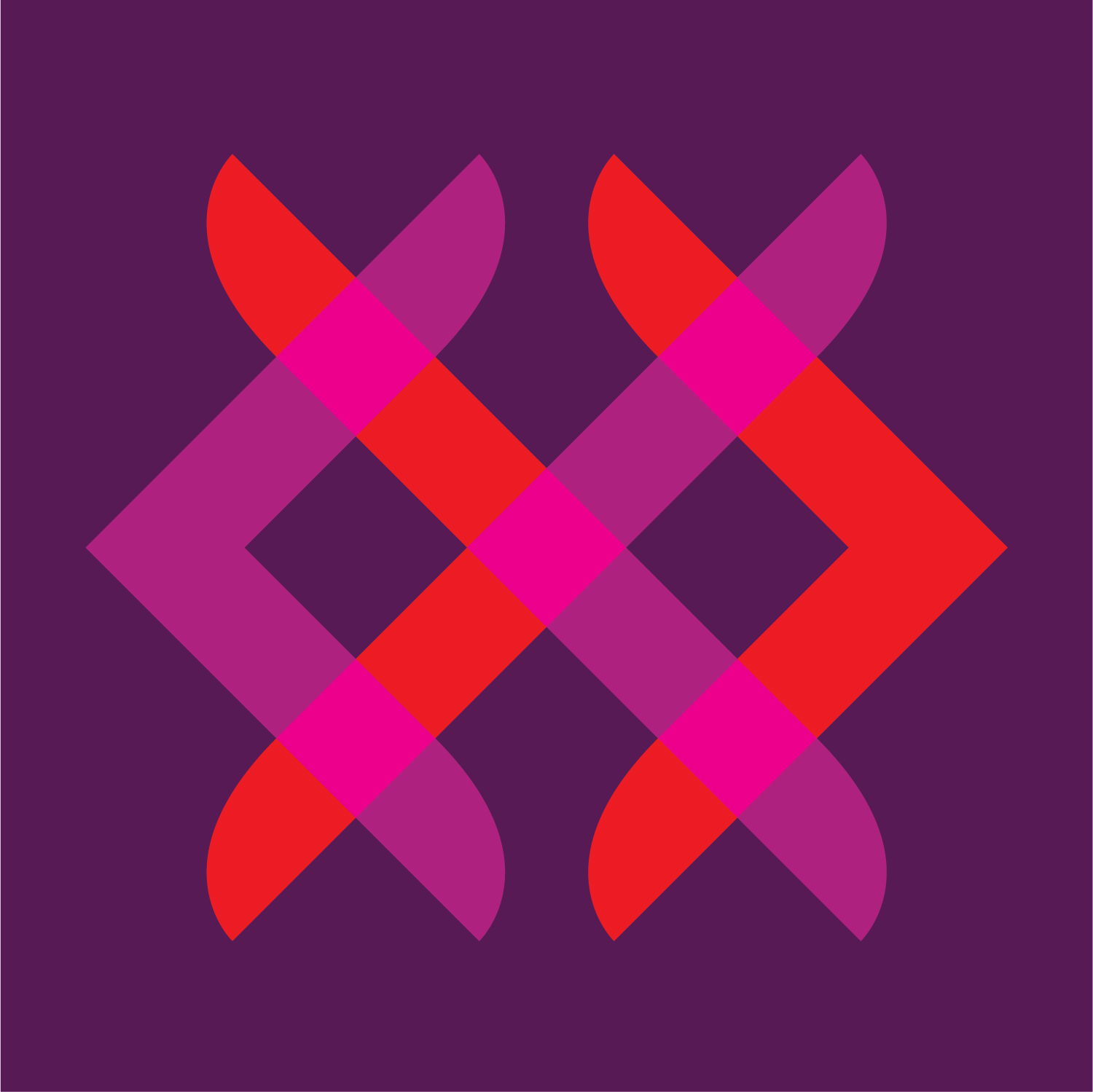
ALRANZ logo

== Founding of ALRANZ ==
The Abortion Law Reform Association of New Zealand (ALRANZ) was founded in response to organising by anti-abortion rights groups, such as the Catholic organisation the Society for the Protection of the Unborn Child (SPUC). The campaigns of these anti-abortion rights groups provoked a strong reaction, with some questioning the veracity of their claims about the medical consequences of abortion and the experiences of overseas countries with liberal laws. Pro-abortion rights supporters perceived suffering of unhappily pregnant women seeking abortion and considered that children needed to be born to mothers who wanted them and could support them. On 4 August 1970, a group of approximately 60 concerned individuals met in Auckland to form ALRANZ.

The founding meeting in 1970 was chaired by Wayne Facer, an Auckland University administrator, who became the first research officer for ALRANZ. At the meeting, it was decided that a steering committee should be formed, charged with drafting aims and objectives. The steering committee reported back to a meeting held in the Unitarian Church, Ponsonby Road on 15 September 1970. At that meeting ALRANZ endorsed the draft aims, and a constitution was prepared to establish ALRANZ as an incorporated society. Some of the early members included family planning doctor and paediatrician, Dr Alice Bush (1914–1974). As at 1975, the following served on the Advisory Council for ALRANZ.

- Dr. Ross Blue, Obstetrician and Gynaecologist, Auckland
- Dr. D. P. Boshier, Associate Professor Reproductive Biology, University of Auckland
- Prof. R. B. Elliott, Head of Dept Paediatrics, University of Auckland
- Dr. J. P. B. Fitzgerald, O&G Dept, University of Otago
- Rev. Prof. Lloyd Geering, Professor of Religious Studies, Victoria University of Wellington
- Prof. R. A. M. Gregson, Professor of Psychology, University of Canterbury
- Dr. V. J. Hartfield, Obstetrician & Gynaecologist, Wanganui Hospital
- Prof. J. I. Hubbard, Professor of Neurophysiology, University of Otago
- Prof. B. James, Chairman Dept Psychological Medicine, University of Otago
- Prof. J.R. McCreary, Professor of Social Work, Victoria University of Wellington
- Dr. R. D. MacDiarmid, General Practitioner, Dunedin
- Rev Dr. F. W. R. Nichol, Professor of Theology, Knox College, Dunedin
- Prof. J. E. Ritchie, Professor of Psychology, University of Waikato
- Prof. J. L. Roberts, Professor School of Political Science, Victoria University of Wellington
- Prof. J. L. Ryan, Dean of Faculty of Law, University of Canterbury
- Prof. H. H. Schaefer, Professor of Psychology, University of Auckland
- Prof. J. D. Sinclair, Professor Dept of Physiology, University of Auckland
- Prof. A. J. W. Taylor, Professor of Clinical Psychology, Victoria University of Wellington
- Prof. A. M. O. Veale, Professor of Human Genetics, University of Auckland
- Prof. Peter Webb, Professor School of Law, University of Auckland
- Prof. John Scott Werry, Professor Dept of Psychiatry, University of Auckland

== Leadership ==
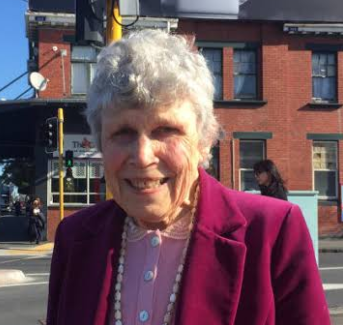
Dame Margaret Sparrow, former national president of ALRANZ Abortion Rights Aotearoa

- Dame Margaret Sparrow served as president from 1975 to 1980, and again from 1984 until March 2011. Sparrow was a venereologist in Wellington and also had long-standing involvement with the Family Planning Association of New Zealand until her retirement.
- In March 2011, Dr Morgan Healey took over the role of president. Healey had until then served as ALRANZ National Secretary.
- In June 2015, Ms Terry Bellamak stepped into the role. A former executive at Goldman Sachs (USA), Bellamak took up New Zealand citizenship in 2011 and studied law in the country.
- As of December 2021, Dr Tracy Morison has served as ALRANZ president. Morison was trained as a psychologist in South Africa and works as an academic at Massey University. Her expertise are in sexual and reproductive decision-making, and she has published extensively in this area.

== Policy position ==
ALRANZ lobbied for total decriminalisation of abortion in New Zealand for 40 years, a goal that was finally realised in 2020. Despite the law change, ALRANZ continues to lobby for improvements to the law and to monitor its implementation. The organisation continues to lobby for the following legal changes:

- no certifying consultants, people must be able to self-refer to abortion service
- removal of gestation limits
- loosening of restrictions on where abortions can be performed and by whom
- proper treatment of early medical abortions
- rebalance of ‘conscientious objection’ to place the burden on the provider rather than the patient
- safe areas: a mandated 150 m buffer zone around all health care facilities offering pregnancy termination services

In so doing, ALRANZ wants to see abortion laws that no longer breach the fundamental human rights of those seeking to terminate a pregnancy. The organisation wants abortion to be treated purely as health care issue, not a moral issue.

== The law reform process ==
After its inception in 1970, ALRANZ became a de facto referral and advice service for women and their families, despite the lack of abortion services in the country at the time.

=== The early years: 1970–1980s ===
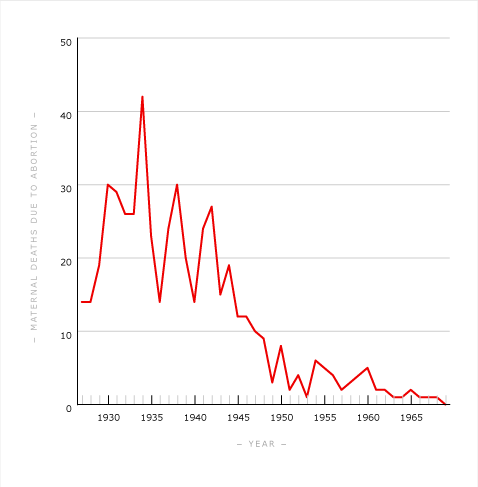
Abortion deaths, 1927–1970

==== AMAC Abortion Clinic ====
New Zealand’s first abortion clinic, the Auckland Medical Aid Centre, opened in Remuera, Auckland, on 17 May 1974 and although it was not an ALRANZ project, many ALRANZ members were actively involved. The clinic offended the authorities and sparked a series of police actions, court cases and moves in Parliament to rein in abortion access. These in turn prompted the Labour Government to announce the establishment of a Royal Commission on Contraception Sterilisation and Abortion to examine New Zealand's laws.

==== The Royal Commission ====
In November 1975, Dr Margaret Sparrow made a submission to the commission on behalf of ALRANZ, and came under sustained personal attack from lawyers from SPUC (Society for the Protection of Unborn Children), who were permitted to question her. While other groups made submissions, the Royal Commission was dominated by SPUC and its lawyers.

==== The Contraception, Sterilisation, and Abortion Act 1977 ====
The Royal Commission recommended a bill, designed by SPUC, to make it difficult to get an abortion. Their motivations centred around concerns about the decline in churchgoing and the changing role of women in society. In the final analysis, they hoped to turn the clock back on the 1960s. Immediately after passage of the law, hundreds of women were forced to travel to Australia for abortion care. This represented an escalation of a trend that began in the 1970s, in which pregnant New Zealanders had to travel to get abortion care. SOS (Sisters Overseas Service) groups were set up across the country to help women travel, with ALRANZ members involved in many of those groups.

In January 1982, Melvyn Wall, an anti-abortion paediatrician, challenged the decision of two certifying consultants to approve an abortion for a 15-year-old. The case became famous as Wall v Livingston, after Wall and one of the two certifying consultants involved. Wall lost the case. Wall v Livingston became one of the foundations of New Zealand's abortion regime; it protects the independence of certifying consultants to make decisions without interference.

The 1980s saw continued skirmishing but no notable legislative changes. However, during that time, health boards began providing abortion services, including opening clinics in Wellington (Parkview, 1980) and Christchurch (Lyndhurst, 1986). These clinics faced sustained opposition, in the form of arson attacks and bomb threats. ALRANZ and other pro-abortion rights organisations worked to defend clinics and abortion services, as well as continuing to advocate for law change.

=== 1990s–2000s ===
Despite ongoing lobbying efforts by ALRANZ and other pro-abortion rights groups, the 1990s saw no legislative changes around abortion rights. Political pressure for change had eased over the years because of the more liberal approach taken by certifying consultants in the wake of Wall v Livingston. Coupled with the end of Second-Wave feminism, groups like ALRANZ that were formed in the 1970s began to lose membership as activism waned. ALRANZ, which at its height had active groups across the country, saw its last branch, in Hawke's Bay, wind up in 2004, meaning it became a national group (based in Wellington) only. A small cadre of committed members in Wellington, including Dame Margaret Sparrow kept the organisation alive, continuing to produce newsletters, write submissions to reproductive-health related legislation as well as lobby for law change. Sparrow played key roles on other fronts, too including in setting up a not-for-profit company, Istar, to import the abortion pill (mifepristone or RU486) into New Zealand.

=== 21st century ===
A revival of feminist activism in the new millennium also helped ALRANZ rebuild, as a new generation of women saw New Zealand’s 30-plus year old law as a discriminatory example of outdated notions about reproductive rights and justice.

In 2010, when Healey took over from longtime president Sparrow, a basic website, which Dame Margaret had helped set up, was revamped and younger activists joined the ALRANZ executive. That year ALRANZ supported Labour Party MP Steve Chadwick's 2010 bill to decriminalise abortion up to 24 weeks.

During the period of 2010 to 2017, ALRANZ supported Sparrow in writing key texts on the history of abortion in New Zealand:

1. Risking Their Lives: NZ Abortion Stories 1900–1939 (Victoria University Press, 2010)
2. Rough on Women: Abortion in Nineteenth Century New Zealand (VUP, 2014)
3. Risking Their Lives: NZ Abortion Stories 1900–1939 (VUP, 2017)

In 2013, ALRANZ executive member Alison McCulloch published Fighting to Choose: The Abortion Rights Struggle in New Zealand (VUP), and embarked on a months-long nationwide activist book tour supported by WONAAC and ALRANZ. That same year, Terry Bellamak, in conjunction with ALRANZ, set up the MyDecision site aimed at collating information about doctor, pharmacists, and others involved in reproductive health care who refused to treat patients (under the auspices of "conscientious objection").

==== Right to Life NZ v Abortion Supervisory Committee (2005–2012) ====
In 2005, anti-abortion group Right to Life NZ (RTL, founded in 2000 by Ken Orr, formerly of SPUC) took its long running complaints about how the Abortion Supervisory Committee (ASC) was interpreting the abortion laws to the courts. The cases took many twists and turns, finally reaching the Supreme Court. Along the way, while RTL lost on several key points, including their attempt to secure a legal status under New Zealand Bill of Rights Act for the "unborn child". In 2008, RTL had a positive ruling, in which Forrest Miller J questioned the legality of more than 98 percent of abortions being approved under the mental health ground (section 187A (1)(a) of the Crimes Act 1961). However, when the case ended in August 2012, the Supreme Court ruled that the ASC does not have the power to scrutinise individual doctors' decisions about abortion approvals. The ruling underscored how vulnerable abortion access was under the law before reform. ALRANZ closely followed the case for its seven years, offering analysis and media commentary. After the case ended, ALRANZ continued to question why Crown Law was not moving to collect on the more than $70,000 court costs owed by RTL. Those costs were finally paid in 2015.

=== Changing the conversation: 2015–2020 ===
In 2015, Bellamak took up leadership of ALRANZ, and under her leadership the organisation lobbied strongly for decriminalisation primarily for health and safety reasons. In a television appearance in 2017, Bellamak challenged the belief—expressed on the programme by then Prime Minister Bill English—that the status quo of de facto abortion on demand was sufficient. Bellamak argued that the law required those seeking an abortion "to basically lie and say they're mentally ill, or they will be mentally ill if they carry the child to term."

==== Public opinion ====
A national poll commissioned by ALRANZ in 2017 indicated that a majority of New Zealanders supported the legalisation of abortion in all seven specific circumstances given to them in the survey (e.g., maternal death, contraceptive failure, rape, etc.). These results were supported by the subsequent New Zealand Attitudes and Values Survey. This 20-year longitudinal panel study showed that the majority of New Zealanders support of a person's right to abortion, with support gradually increasing over time. Other smaller surveys, such as the Gender Attitudes Survey, also supported these findings. At the moment of law reform in 2020, support hovered between 65 - 69%.

==== Labour Party commits to decriminalisation ====
The change in public sentiment was reflected in national politics. During 2017 national election campaign, the Labour Party, then in opposition, pledged to support decriminalisation. This commitment was announced by the party leader Jacinda Ardern during a televised debate.

==== Human rights complaint ====
In 2018 ALRANZ brought a human rights complaint against the New Zealand government for its discriminatory abortion laws and the case went before the Human Rights Review Tribunal. The complaint was withdrawn subsequent to the new legislation passed in March 2020, as law reform had made the issues in the case moot, at least for the time being.

==== Patient harassment and clinic safe zones ====
Alongside lobbying for law reform, ALRANZ also spoke out about issues related to abortion services. Harassment of patients accessing services was (and continues to be) an issue that ALRANZ has confronted. In 2016 the question of safe zones outside facilities was raised in response to protests against the anti-abortion harassment of Thames hospital abortion patients. ALRANZ member Scott Summerfield was the local organiser of the protests and along with abortion-rights supporters held protests outside Thames hospital in support of patients who access the abortion service. The issue of safe zones continues to be a concern pursued by ALRANZ subsequent to law reform.

=== Passage of Abortion Legislation Act 2020 ===
After 40 years of lobbying for change, in March 2020, New Zealand amended its abortion laws and decriminalised abortion after passage of the Abortion Legislation Act 2020. Abortion is now regulated under health legislation.

== See also ==
- Abortion in New Zealand
- Voice for Life
