= Operation Rescue =

Operation Rescue may refer to:

- Operation Rescue (Kansas), a United States anti-abortion organization (formerly Operation Rescue West or California Operation Rescue, now simply Operation Rescue)
- Operation Rescue New Zealand, a short-lived New Zealand anti-abortion organization
- Operation Save America, a United States anti-abortion organization (formerly Operation Rescue or Operation Rescue National)
- "Operation: Rescue Jet Fusion", a Jimmy Neutron: Boy Genius episode
- "Operation Rescue", a song by American punk band Bad Religion from their 1990 album Against the Grain (Bad Religion album)
- "Operation Rescue" (March 2011), a law enforcement operation conducted by members of the Virtual Global Taskforce that targeted an online child sex offender network

== See also ==
- History of Operation Rescue
- Randall Terry
