= Contraceptive rights in New Zealand =

Contraceptive rights in New Zealand are extensive. There are many options available to women seeking contraception. There are also options for men. Government funding keeps the cost of most types of contraception low in most cases. Family planning options in New Zealand are generally in keeping with the United Nations stance towards sexual and reproductive rights although the country has received criticism in some aspects.

== Contraception as a human right ==
The United Nations believes that access to family planning services, including contraception, is a human right. The United Nations Population Fund states that 'to maintain one's sexual and reproductive health, people need access to accurate information and the safe, effective, affordable and acceptable contraception method of their choice.

The Convention on the Elimination of All Forms of Discrimination Against Women was ratified by New Zealand in 1985. Article 12 of the convention states that 'States Parties shall take all appropriate measures to eliminate discrimination against women in the field of health care in order to ensure, on a basis of equality of men and women, access to health care services, including those related to family planning.'

New Zealand, as a state that has ratified the convention, is required to give periodic reports to a convention monitoring committee. The committee then replies with its concluding observations. New Zealand's most recent report was given to the committee at its 52nd session in July 2012. The committee stated in its concluding observations that it 'commends the State party for its advocacy on the protection of women's sexual and reproductive health rights'.

== History of contraception in New Zealand ==
In the earlier part of the 20th century, 'New Zealand did not have laws against the use of contraception, but there were regulations that stopped people finding out about birth control methods – and sex in general.' The first birth control clinic was opened in Auckland in 1953 by the New Zealand Family Planning Association. The pill became available in New Zealand in 1961, although its prescription was regulated to married women only.

Teenage girls were unlikely to be taking the pill, and did not seek doctors' prescriptions for it. This was because they knew doctors would be unlikely to provide them with it as it was against the policy of the New Zealand Medical Association to do so, and because it was expensive for young women likely to be earning a low wage, or even none at all.

In the 1970s the Family Planning Association criticised the governments' refusal to give them funding, pointing out that the prime minister had signed the 1967 United Nations World Leaders Declaration on Population, which advocated for contraception. In December 1971 the New Zealand cabinet approved its first grant to the Association.

A national survey in 1979 revealed that over 66% of fertile women were using contraception. In the 1990s a study showed 87% of women surveyed in New Zealand were using some form of contraception, a higher percentage of women than many other countries surveyed.

== Funding and subsidies ==
The United Nations has stated that family planning is an essential component in reducing poverty. This is also recognised in New Zealand. For women on various social security benefits, including girls who are dependent on a parent who receives a benefit, there is a contraceptive grant available which covers the cost of long-acting reversible contraception.

The Pharmaceutical Management Agency (Pharmac) maintains the New Zealand Pharmaceutical Schedule, which lists all medication subsidised by the government in New Zealand. Fully subsidised medication listed on the schedule cost $5 every three months to cover dispensing costs.

== The pill ==
The combined oral contraceptive pill is a common method of contraception in New Zealand alongside the progestogen-only pill (mini pill). In 2009 approximately 202,000 women in New Zealand were taking the pill. The pill is not available over the counter in New Zealand. It is available by prescription by a health professional such as a general practitioner or a nurse. Nevertheless, the New Zealand Family Planning website states that 'the pill is easily accessible to all women in New Zealand'.

Although the age of consent is 16 in New Zealand, those under 16 can still be given contraception. Parental consent for the provision of contraceptives to their children is not required. Section 3 of the Contraception, Sterilisation, and Abortion Act 1977 regulating the provision of contraception to children was repealed in 1990.

=== Subsidisation ===
As of February 2017, the government subsidised three formulations of the combined oral contraceptive pill (ethinyloestradiol with norethisterone, ethinyloestradiol with desogestrel, and ethinyloestradiol with levonorgestrel), and two formulations of the progestogen-only pill (levonorgestrel and norethisterone). A non-subsidised six-month supply could cost up to $100, depending on its type. Appointment costs at family planning clinics may also be subsidised: appointments are free for women under 22 years of age. For women 22 and older, appointments are five dollars for a community services card holder and $27 for those without a community services card.

=== Issues ===
The pill is currently classified as a prescription medicine in New Zealand. However, there is debate over whether it should be reclassified as restricted medicine, which would allow it to be sold over the counter in pharmacies throughout the country. The company Green Cross Health Ltd has lobbied to the Medicine Classifications Committee for reclassification since 2014. The Classifications Committee has stated that it is concerned that sidelining the role of doctors in prescribing contraception may result in inadequate counselling and advice on sexual health. Green Cross has stated that pharmacists are 'well equipped to consult with women about their contraceptive needs' and also claims that women would find it more convenient.

== Other forms of contraception available ==
=== Condoms ===
Another common form of contraception in New Zealand is the condom. These are commonly available at supermarkets and pharmacies in New Zealand. There is no age restriction on buying condoms. These are also available on prescription from a doctor or family planning nurse. When purchased on prescription, they are subsidised for up to 144 condoms. This is significantly cheaper than buying condoms from a store, where the price can be up to $20 for one pack of 12 condoms.

== Implants ==
Levonorgestrel implants (Jadelle) are available in New Zealand. These implants are subsidised, although there is a $22 charge for dressing and prescription at family planning clinics.

Etonogestrel contraceptive implants (Implanon) cost around $270 for New Zealand residents from a family planning clinic. They are not government subsidised.

=== IUDs ===
The copper IUD has been available in New Zealand since the 1970s. The New Zealand Family Planning website lists it as being available at no cost to New Zealand residents.

The mirena Pharmac has agreed to fully fund Mirena and Jaydess contraceptives, from November 2019.

=== Sterilisation ===
Sterilization is a popular method of contraception in New Zealand. It has been claimed by academics that 'sterilization has become the preferred method of fertility regulation among women of older reproductive ages.' Often one or the other partner in a relationship undergoes sterilization. Women undergo tubal ligation and men undergo a vasectomy. New Zealand Family Planning reports that the country has 'one of the highest rates of vasectomy in the world' with 18% of men and 25% of married men having undergone the procedure. Doctors may object to performing sterilisations on conscience grounds but must refer the patient to another practitioner.

== The emergency contraceptive pill ==
The emergency contraceptive pill is available in New Zealand. It is able to be purchased over the counter at pharmacies without a prescription for around $40–$80. Alternatively, they can be obtained for free from a family planning clinic, or at a cost of $5 for a three-pill prescription.

== See also ==
- Reproductive rights
- Abortion in New Zealand
- Health care in New Zealand
- Women's rights
