= Operation Rescue New Zealand =

New Zealand anti-abortion activist group

Operation Rescue New Zealand was a short-lived New Zealand anti-abortion civil disobedience group (1988–1993), partly formed from Wellington and Christchurch groups known as pro-life action groups. It was originally initiated by a group of four young men who first sought to "rescue" unborn children through prayer and non-violent means. The first New Zealand "rescue attempt" occurred outside Parkview Clinic in Wellington in October 1988, involving four men: Columban and Fintan Devine, Brendan and John Greally. Operation Rescue NZ later adopted much of its philosophy from Joseph Scheidler's Pro-Life Action League, more so from Joan Andrews-Bell's Operation Rescue (now Operation Save America). It was formally established in different regions by well known abortion opponents Mary O'Neill (South), John Greally (Central) and Phil O'Connor (North), but only after a series of "rescues" involving the four mentioned above.

The publicity stirred a few outsiders to conduct private rescues, of which Aucklander Ross Bolton was most known. Inspired by the actions of the first few, Ross Bolton and his followers started blockading abortion clinics in order to stop women from obtaining abortions. This resulted in him being sent to prison four times, serving over 40 weeks in jail from August 1987. Bolton hired older men mainly for his "missions" because 'older men have little to lose by going to jail for trespassing'. However, he was left seen as a fanatic and ignored by many public and religious figures.

However, Operation Rescue New Zealand became caught between its radical clinic-based action and the more conservative anti-abortion mainstream. The well networked pro-choice counterparts found they were able to swiftly mobilise clinic counterpickets in Christchurch and Wellington, based on information received from a series of infiltrators. Faced with such opposition, Operation Rescue New Zealand felt trapped in a no-win tactical situation. As pro-choice opposition mounted, more old-fashioned abortion opponents expressed concerns about tactical naiveté on the part of Operation Rescue. Tensions between conservative Catholics and fundamentalist Protestants emerged, as for example when conservative Catholic Operation Rescue advocates prayed the rosary outside clinics or Protestants used spiritual warfare prayer before "rescue" attempts, thereby angering each other. Donations diminished as members of SPUC (now Voice for Life) and other more staid anti-abortion groups withdrew financial and moral support, while Operation Rescue rapidly lost active members to good behaviour bonds, lengthier imprisonment, and mounting legal bills. It was not long before it quickly petered out, having had little effect on abortion statistics or overall attitudes towards abortion in New Zealand during its relatively short period of activity (the largest "rescue" involved in excess of 100 being arrested, with 200 others, nearby in support).

Details involved in Operation Rescue's demise largely contributed to antagonisms within the anti-abortion movement involving members of the Society of St. Pius X. Many former Christchurch Operation Rescue members who were also members of SPUC (Christchurch Branch) (now Right to Life New Zealand) strongly favoured more radical parliamentary and legal strategies such as the reintroduction of the Status of the Unborn Child Bill and abortion legality test cases, with the parent organisation thinking untimely or infeasible. After repeated disagreements, SPUC (National Body) expelled their Christchurch branch, which then needed a new name, becoming "Right to Life New Zealand".

== See also ==
- Abortion in New Zealand
