= Suzana Kunac =

Croatian sociologist and activist

Suzana Kunac (born 1971 in Split, Croatia) is a Croatian sociologist and activist.

== Biography ==
She graduated with a degree in sociology from the Faculty of Philosophy at the University of Zagreb in 1998.

She was a member of the feminist organization B.a.B.e.

Kunac is a member of the Electronic Media Council of Croatia and was appointed to the council in November 2013 by the Milanović government. She was also appointed by the Milanović government as a member of the Ministry of Culture's committee for non-profit media, which was subsequently dissolved in 2016 by the new Orešković government. In September 2012 she was named to the Croatian government's Council for the Civil Society Development.

In March 2015 she was elected to the supervisory committee of the Antifascist League of the Republic of Croatia.
