= Voice for Life =

Voice for Life logo

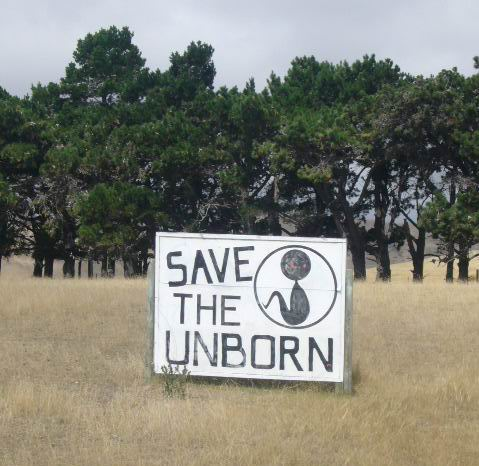
A roadside sign in the South Island opposing abortion

Voice for Life, formerly known as the Society for the Protection of the Unborn Child (SPUC), is a New Zealand anti-abortion advocacy group. It has also lobbied against infanticide, embryonic stem cell research, cloning and euthanasia. In recent years, it has strongly campaigned against the decriminalisation of euthanasia in New Zealand as well as abortion, but was unsuccessful in preventing the decriminalisation of either in 2020.

== History ==
=== Founding ===
Voice for Life was founded in March 1970, as the Society for the Protection of the Unborn Child, by pioneering New Zealand foetal surgeon William Liley, who became the organisation's first president, and fellow Auckland doctor Patrick Dunn, the leader of the Family Rights Association. Liley was an obstetrician and gynaecologist internationally renowned as the "father of foetology", the pioneering science of life in the womb. He was deeply disturbed by the changes in the British medical profession following the passing of the Abortion Act 1967 and wrote numerous articles for NZ newspapers and journals explaining the humanity of the embryo and foetus from conception and the case for effective protection. The organisation should not be confused with the similarly motivated and named, UK-based Society for the Protection of Unborn Children, which is also abbreviated to SPUC.

=== Response to abortion reform, 1970s ===
The abortion debate of the 1960s and 1970s stirred powerful passions, particularly as "reproductive freedom" was at the forefront of second-wave feminism and the women's liberation movement. SPUC played a major advocacy role in a divided Parliament, which in 1975 established a Royal Commission on Contraception, Sterilisation and Abortion. By 1975, SPUC had grown to more than 40,000 members with 56 branches.

Parliamentarians wrestled with the problem of how to reconcile protection for the fertilised egg, embryo, or foetus with the needs of women who were seeking abortions. In 1975, Parliament passed Labour MP Gerard Wall's Hospital Amendment Act, which limited abortion services to public hospitals. National Party MP Frank Gill attempted to entrench Wall's bill through the Health Amendment Bill 1976 but pro-abortion rights National MP George Gair managed to pass an amendment deferring it by twelve months. In March and April 1976, the Royal Commission released its report on contraception, abortion, and sterilisation to the Governor-General and wider public. The Commission recommended decriminalising abortion when the pregnancy posed a serious danger to the life, physical and mental health of the mother. SPUC cautiously welcomed the Commission's report for affirming the rights of the unborn child while expressing concern about using mental health as a loophole to allow abortions.

In August 1977, Justice Minister David Thomson introduced the Contraception, Sterilisation and Abortion Act 1977 (CS&A Act 1977) into Parliament. Several anti-abortion politicians including National MPs Bill Birch and Barry Brill, and Labour MPs Wall and Basil Arthur proposed amendments restricting the criteria for abortions and scrutinising the list of certifying medical consultants. Following a series of heated debates, Parliament adopted the Birch Amendment, which stipulated that abortions could only be authorised by two certifying consultants, and the Brill Amendment, which eliminated soci-economic considerations as a factor for assessing the health of prospective abortion patients. During the parliamentary debate, SPUC also sponsored an anti-abortion advertisement in the tabloid New Zealand Truth equating abortion with murder, which attracted considerable public outrage.

On 15 December, the Contraception, Sterilisation and Abortion Act passed its third reading and became law. It amended the Crimes Act 1961 to allow certain grounds for abortion and established the legal framework for performing abortions. The Abortion Supervisory Committee oversees the working of the Act under which 98% of all abortions are approved on mental health grounds. However, while it appoints certifying consultants, it has no power to breach doctor/patient medical confidentiality, nor is it able to remove certifying consultants once appointed. While abortion rights advocates were dismayed with the limitations of the CS&A ACt, SPUC regarded the new law as a victory since it placed safeguards and limits on abortion operations. The year 1977 marked the high point of SPUC's success as a lobby group. The Dominion's editor Jack Kelliher credited SPUC leader J.D. Dalgety and his organisation for their role in influencing the debate around the CS&A Act 1977.

=== Legal challenges to abortion, 1980s–1990s ===
Following the decriminalisation of abortion, SPUC mounted various campaigns to ensure that healthcare providers adhered to the Contraception, Sterilisation and Abortion Act. SPUC leader Pryor was critical of the Sisters Overseas Service (SOS), regarding it as an attempt to circumvent New Zealand's abortion legislation. SPUC also vetted candidates for the Abortion Supervisory Committee, objecting to certifying consultants which it deemed to be pro-abortion while seeking the appointment of anti-abortion doctors. In 1980, SPUC successfully secured the removal of two members of the Abortion Supervisory Committee (ASC) by arguing that they had been promoting abortion by encouraging hospital boards to establish abortion services. However, the replacement members did not support SPUC's anti-abortion agenda. That same year, two SPUC–backed candidates were elected to Wellington hospital board. In 1987, SPUC's Dunedin branch leader John O'Neill appeared before the New Zealand Parliament's Justice and Law Reform Select Committee demanding the removal of the entire ASC committee including the SPUC-backed replacements on the grounds that it had failed to carry out its functions

According to its official historian, late former president Marilyn Pryor, the New Zealand anti-abortion movement suffered a devastating defeat in the 1982 Auckland High Court case Wall v Livingston, in which an anti-abortion doctor named Melvyn Wall attempted a legal challenge to an abortion for a fifteen-year-old girl that had been approved by two certifying consultants. Wall lost the case, with Justice Speight ruling that the fetus could not be represented and had no statutory rights until born and that the decisions of certifying consultants were beyond judicial review. This decision has served as a legal precedent for protecting women's access to abortion services in New Zealand.

In 1983, National Member of Parliament Doug Kidd introduced a SPUC–inspired private members bill called the Status of the Unborn Child Bill. The SPUC leadership had worked with the lawyer Nigel Jamieson to design the Status of the Unborn Child Bill. At SPUC's invitation, Kidd agreed to sponsor the bill. In response to the bill, the feminist National Member of Parliament Marilyn Waring introduced the Contraception, Sterilisation and Abortion Repeal Bill as a counterweight to Kidd's bill. Waring also leaked news about Kidd's affair with a parliamentary secretary. Ultimately, both Kidd and Waring's bills were defeated and no significant changes were made to abortion legislation. While Pryor blamed the Status of the Unborn Child Bill's hasty introduction for its defeat, journalist Alison McCulloch attributed the bill's defeat to Waring's counter-bill and Kidd's affair.

In 1991, SPUC Dunedin branch leader O'Neill led a challenge to the validity of abortion licenses throughout New Zealand, leading to the temporary suspension of services in Dunedin on the grounds of a legal technicality connected with the change from the Hospitals Act 1975 to the Area Health Boards Act. As a result, ten abortion operations scheduled for that day were cancelled at short notice. As a result of O'Neill's success, SPUC began coordinating complains in other New Zealand regions, leading to the suspension of abortion services in Waikato for four days. O'Neill's oldest daughter Mary was also involved in anti-abortion protests at hospitals. In 1991, she was convicted of trespassing at a hospital following an aggressive hospital invasion in December 1989.

=== Informed Consent booklet ===
In the 1990s, SPUC, concerned about the information provided to unwillingly pregnant women seeking abortions, started an initiative that resulted in New Zealand's Ministry of Health producing an information booklet. The Minister of Health at the time was Bill English, who strongly opposed abortion. After repeated delays, the booklet was published. In September 1988, the ministry sent out 25,000 copies of the 18-page booklet, "Considering an Abortion? What are your Options?" However, the booklets were returned to the ministry by both the New Zealand Family Planning Council and counselors at some clinics that provided abortions, although some general practitioners kept and used them. The booklet has not been reprinted.

=== Death With Dignity Bill 1995 ===
In 1995, after the Northern Territory temporarily decriminalised euthanasia in that area of Australia, then-New Zealand National Party MP Michael Laws introduced an analogous voluntary euthanasia private members bill into the New Zealand Parliament. However, the Death With Dignity Bill 1995 failed to pass its first reading after opposition from SPUC, the New Zealand Conference of Catholic Bishops and other opponents. The margin of defeat was heavy (61-29).

=== Anti-abortion schism ===
In 2000, policy differences between the SPUC national leadership and the Christchurch branch led to the expulsion of the latter from the national organisation. Ken Orr, the Christchurch branch's spokesperson, wanted to push for abortion legislation but the national leadership wanted to wait for a strong anti-abortion government. According to McCulloch, tensions between Pryor and Orr dated back to 1980. In response, SPUC demanded that the Christchurch branch cease using the SPUC name in its lobbying activities and also told the media and politicians that Orr no longer represented the organisation. In September 2000, the Christchurch branch formally seceded from SPUC and became Right to Life New Zealand. In 2004, SPUC revamped itself as Voice for Life.

=== Death With Dignity Bill 2003 ===
In 2003, New Zealand First Deputy Leader Peter Brown introduced a second incarnation of the Death With Dignity Bill into the New Zealand Parliament, which again sought to decriminalise euthanasia in New Zealand. As with the previous Death With Dignity Bill introduced in 1995, the private members bill was defeated at its first reading, but under a much narrower margin (60-58). Again, Voice for Life and other anti-euthanasia organisations opposed the decriminalisation bill and applauded its defeat.

=== Breast cancer controversy ===
Voice for Life in the mid-2000s ran nationwide advertisements on a questionable "abortion-breast cancer" link. In 2003 they brought to Australia Angela Lanfranchi, a private breast surgeon, who claimed that abortion increased the risk of breast cancer. The CV provided by SPUC showed that Lanfranchi has one publication to her name. The booklet she wrote on the subject is distributed by abortion foe Babette Francis of the Endeavour Forum of Australia. The National Women's Health Network, along with the American Cancer Society and the U.S. National Cancer Institute (NCI), evaluated the science on the issue and decided that the claim was unfounded. The NCI published a fact sheet on its website explaining the science and concluding that abortion did not increase the risk of breast cancer, before 2000, which was taken down after George W. Bush was elected U.S. president. A similar study early in 2003 reached the same conclusion.

=== Recent activities ===
In late July 2018, Voice for Life President Jacqui de Ruiters and other anti-abortion demonstrators laid 13,285 pairs of booties on the lawn of the New Zealand Parliament to highlight the number of abortions in New Zealand the previous year. Their presence attracted a counter-demonstration by pro-abortion rights protesters, some of whom donned handmaid's uniforms based on Margaret Atwood's The Handmaid's Tale.

=== Decriminalisation of abortion, March 2020 ===
In September 2019, Voice for Life also sent a submission opposing the Labour-led coalition government's Abortion Legislation Act 2020, which would decriminalise abortion and ease restrictions on abortion access. New Zealand anti-abortionists failed to halt the decriminalisation of abortion, however, as the Abortion Legislation Act 2019 passed its third reading and became law on 24 March 2020.

=== Decriminalisation of euthanasia, October 2020 ===
Voice for Life and other anti-euthanasia organisations fought the passage of the End of Life Choice Act 2020, but were unable to halt either its parliamentary passage, or its ratification within a subsequent binding referendum on the legislation held concurrently with the New Zealand general election 2020. Two-thirds of voters supported ratification of the Act, which came into force on 6 November 2021

== Organisation and activities ==
As of 2019, Voice for Life has 30 branches across New Zealand and 4,500 members. Besides abortion, Voice for Life has also spoken out against infanticide, experimentation on embryos, cloning and euthanasia. Voice for Life's advocacy and communications activities have included stalls at public events, newspaper adverts, distributing informational material, contacts with the media and lobbying politicians. As of 2020, the current Voice for Life President is Kate Cormack.

== See also ==
- Abortion in New Zealand
