= Nina Hood =

New Zealand education researcher

Nina Hood MNZM
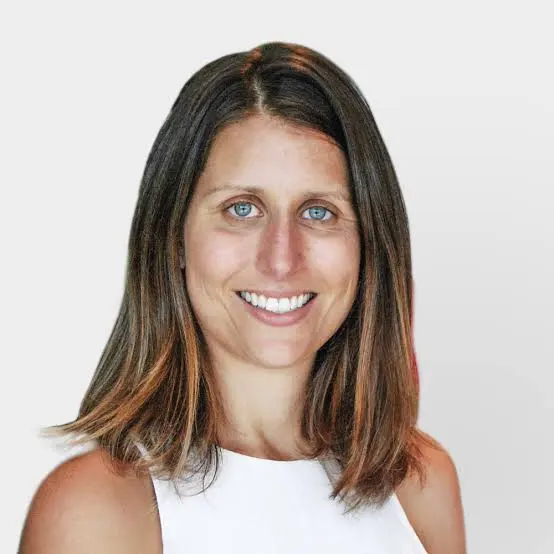
- Education: Courtauld Institute of Art (BA), New York University (MA), University of Auckland (GradDipEd), University of Oxford (MSc, DPhil)
- Occupation: Business woman
- Known for: Founder of The Education Hub; Co-founder of The Teachers’ Institute
- Parent: Sir John Hood
- Relatives: Dorothy Winstone (grandmother)

Nina Hood is a New Zealand business woman. She founded The Education Hub, and co-founded The Teachers’ Institute.

== Education ==
Hood attended St Cuthbert's College, Auckland, where she was the director for the student company Zenith. The company won the 2001 Young Enterprise Scheme Supreme Award as they invented, manufactured, marketed, and sold a word game similar to Scrabble called Take Two.

She completed a bachelor's degree in art history, criticism and conservation at the Courtauld Institute of Art (2004–2007), followed by a master's in art history from New York University (2007–2009). She received a graduate diploma in secondary teaching from the University of Auckland (2009).

Hood later completed a Master of Science in education (Learning and Technology, 2011–2012) and a doctor of philosophy (DPhil) in education (2012–2015) at the University of Oxford.

== Career ==
Hood began her career in 2011 at Mount Roskill Grammar School, where she taught classics and social studies for a year.

From 2015 to 2023, Hood was a senior lecturer in the Faculty of Education and Social Work at the University of Auckland.

In 2017, she founded The Education Hub, a non-profit that connects educators with accessible, research-based resources. Later in 2025, she also co-founded The Teachers’ Institute, a school-based teacher education program, where she has been serving as an academic director since.

Between 2020 and 2021, she served as editor of ACCESS: Contemporary Issues in Education, overseeing its re-launch.

Hood has worked with the Ministry of Education on curriculum reform, teacher education, and the design of charter schools (Kura Hourua).

Since 2024, Hood has been a research fellow at Koi Tū: The Centre for Informed Futures.

Hood is also a media commentator on education in New Zealand, especially on literacy policy, NCEA standards and reforms, and curriculum design. She has appeared on platforms such as RNZ, The Platform, and Newstalk ZB.

In 2025, Hood was selected in the Humanitarian category of the University of Auckland's "40 Under 40" awards.

== Personal life ==
Nina Hood is partnered with Marek Tesar, dean of the Faculty of Education at the University of Melbourne. They have two sons.

== See also ==
- Education in New Zealand
