= Women's Network Croatia =

Women's Network Croatia Ženska mreža Hrvatske (Croatian)
- Abbreviation: ŽMH
- Formation: 1996
- Type: Non-Profit
- Legal status: NGO
- Headquarters: Kralja Držislava2, 10 000 Zagreb
- Coordinates: 45°48′35″N 15°59′03″E
- Region served: Croatia
- Official language: Croatian language
- Coordinator: Bojana Genov-Matunci
- Website: www.zenska-mreza.hr

The Women's Network Croatia (Croatian: Ženska mreža Hrvatske) is a network of 40 non-governmental organizations based in Zagreb, Croatia. The network is engaged in advocacy and protection of women's rights. Since its formal establishment in 1996 the network brings together numerous feminist organizations from Croatia.

== History ==
In 1990s the network was a part of Anti-War Campaign of Croatia ARK protesting for the end of Yugoslav Wars, protection of conscientious objectors and interethnic reconciliation within Croatia and throughout former Yugoslavia. In its current form, founding of the network happened in the aftermath of the Croatian War of Independence when feminist initiatives in Croatia focused once again on feminist education, academic work and political emancipation.

In 2005 the network conducted its first research on accessibility of abortion in public health institutions during which it concluded that out of 33 licensed institutions 12 of them or 36% was not offering it in practice.

In October 2022 organization's coordinator Bojana Genov criticized government's plan for gender equality and prevention of gender based violence as completely inadequate.

== See also ==
- Women in Croatia
- B.a.B.e.
- Women's Antifascist Front of Croatia
