= Abortion in New Zealand =

Abortion in New Zealand is available within the framework of the Abortion Legislation Act 2020, which eliminated the criminal status of abortion and allows termination on request during the first 20 weeks of pregnancy. After 20 weeks, abortion is permitted only if a health practitioner deems it "clinically appropriate", and consults at least one other health practitioner. However, the law does not specify what the conditions are which constitute "clinically appropriate", and there are no criminal penalties. Abortion is illegal only if a person who is not a licensed health practitioner procures or performs it.

Before 2020, abortion in New Zealand was heavily restricted and criminalised under the Crimes Act 1961, with some changes occurring in 1977 and 1978 to allow abortions under specific circumstances, although subsequent High Court and Court of Appeal decisions liberalised abortion access within that context, particularly Wall v Livingston in 1982. In March 2022, New Zealand implemented explicit "safe access zones" by legislation around abortion clinics and/or hospitals.

== Current legislation ==
Abortion in New Zealand is regulated by four laws: the Abortion Legislation Act 2020, the Contraception, Sterilisation, and Abortion Act 1977 (CS&A Act 1977), the Health Practitioners Competence Assurance Act 2003, and Section 38 of the Care of Children Act 2004. A woman who is not more than 20 weeks pregnant may seek abortion from a health practitioner. A woman seeking an abortion past 20 weeks must obtain approval from a health practitioner, who decides whether the procedure is "clinically appropriate" and consults with at least one other qualified practitioner. Prior to 24 March 2020, women in New Zealand could only seek an abortion after consulting two health practitioners.

=== Abortion Legislation Act 2020 ===
The Abortion Legislation Act 2020 amends two existing laws: the Contraception, Sterilisation, and Abortion Act 1977 and the Crimes Act 1961. While the Abortion Legislation Act's initially introduced safe zones around abortion providers, it was eliminated from the final version of the law.

- Contraception, Sterilisation, and Abortion Act 1977: It replaces Sections 10 to 46 of the CS&A Act 1977 with Sections 10–14 and Sections 19–21. The amended bill also abolishes the Abortion Supervisory Committee, the former regulatory body that reported to Parliament, and gives its former responsibilities to the Minister of Health and the Director-General of Health.
  - Section 10: A qualified health practitioner may provide abortion services to a woman who is not more than 20 weeks pregnant.
  - Section 11: After 20 weeks, a health practitioner can only provide abortion services to a woman if it is deemed clinically appropriate and if they consult at least one other qualified practitioner.
  - Section 13: A health practitioner must advise a woman of the availability of counselling services if the woman seeks advice on whether to continue or terminate a pregnancy; advises the health practitioner of her intention to terminate the pregnancy; or has terminated pregnancy.
  - Section 14: A health practitioner cannot coerce a woman into seeking counselling as a condition for procuring an abortion.
  - Section 19: A health practitioner with a conscientious objection to abortion must inform the patient and provide them with information on accessing alternative abortion providers.
  - Section 20: Employer providing certain services must accommodate conscientious objection of applicant or employee, unless it would cause unreasonable disruption. Abortion is regulated by the Ministry of Health and the Director-General of Health, which oversee the collection and publication of information relating to abortion services and providers. Section 20F states that the New Zealand Parliament opposes abortion for the sole purpose of sex-selection, but does not prohibit the practice.
  - Section 21: The Governor-General has the authority to direct the Director-General of Health to collection information relating to the regulation of abortion services stated in Section 20.
- Crimes Act 1961: Abortion is eliminated from the Crimes Act. The Abortion Legislation Act replaces Sections 182A to 187A with Section 183, which states that abortion is only an offense if a person who is not a health practitioner procures or performs an abortion on a woman. The woman is not guilty of the offense.

=== Health Practitioners Competence Assurance Act 2003 ===
This allows for conscientious objection by medical professionals.

=== Care of Children Act 2004 ===
Section 38 of the Care of Children Act 2004 allows a young woman under the age of 16 to consent to an abortion, but that she must still go through the process outlined in the CS&A Act 1977.

== History ==
=== 19th century and early 20th century ===
English law, applied in New Zealand in 1840, outlawed abortion. In 1867, the New Zealand Parliament made it an offence to cause a miscarriage. Under the law, abortion providers were considered criminals while the woman seeking an abortion was considered an accomplice to the crime. If a woman induced her own abortion, she was considered a criminal under the law. Therapeutic abortions were available under limited circumstances such as when the woman's life or mental health was in serious danger. During the late 1930s, this right was extended by a court judgment. However, abortion was still strongly frowned upon by society with many doctors refusing to perform terminations.

In 1936 the First Labour Government of New Zealand set up a committee, led by D.G. McMillan, to inquire about the incidence of septic abortion in New Zealand. The report estimated that at least 13 in every 100 pregnancies ended in criminal abortion, that number having increased over the five years prior. In the same time period, while maternal deaths had dropped, the number of deaths due to septic abortions had increased, accounting for two-fifths of total maternal mortality. Based on evidence heard before the committee, it was found that a major reason for abortions was a change in social outlook, "particularly towards the rearing of large families" and "an attitude of pitying superiority towards the woman with many children." Other reasons included lack of suitable housing in cities, lack of help for women in performing domestic labour, and the widespread use of ineffective methods of contraception.

In the 1930s, Isabel Annie Aves was tried four times for "unlawfully using an instrument with intent to procure a miscarriage" without conviction. In the 1940s, activists such as Alice Bush advocated for access to doctor-provided abortions.

=== Changing attitudes, 1960s–1970s ===
Following the Second World War, the Sexual Revolution during the 1960s led a change in societal attitudes towards matters of sex, birth control, and motherhood including abortion. These also gave rise to the emergence of Second-wave feminism and the Women's liberation movement during the 1960s and 1970s. Between 1965 and 1970, the number of abortions performed in public hospitals jumped from 70 in 1965 to more than 300 by 1970. Public debate increased following the legalisation of abortion in Britain in 1967, and court decisions in Australia in 1967 and 1970 legalising abortion. The legalisation of abortion in Australia enabled New Zealand women who could afford to travel there to have abortions in Australia.

Growing public awareness and debate about abortion led to the emergence of rival anti-abortion and abortion rights groups. Early anti-abortion groups included the Society for the Protection of the Unborn Children (SPUC) and REPEAL while early abortion rights groups included the Abortion Law Reform Association of New Zealand (ALRANZ) and the more militant Women's National Abortion Action Campaign (WONAAC). According to McCulloch, several Socialist Action League members including Kay Goodger were involved in the formation of WONAAC.

During the 1970s, the Catholic Church, conservative Protestant denominations, and the Mormons opposed abortion. By contrast, the Anglican, Baptist, Methodist, and Presbyterian denominations took a more liberal stance; which generated controversy among their members. In addition, abortion attracted bipartisan support from some members of the New Zealand Parliament including Labour MPs Mary Batchelor and Whetu Tirikatene-Sullivan, and National MPs George Gair and Marilyn Waring.

The first abortion clinic in New Zealand was the Auckland Medical Aid Centre (AMAC), which opened in 1974 and introduced the practice of vacuum aspiration to New Zealand. By the end of its first year, it had provided 2,288 women with abortions. By 1975, this figure had risen to 4,005. AMAC attracted opposition from anti-abortion activists including arson attacks. The New Zealand Police also raided AMAC in 1974, leading to the prosecution and acquittal of one of its doctors, Jim Woolnough.

=== Decriminalising abortion, 1977–1978 ===
In response to AMAC, the New Zealand Parliament passed Labour MP and SPUC member's Gerard Wall's Hospitals Amendment Act 1975 which limited the provision of abortion services to licensed hospitals. While AMAC was forced to close, it later reopened in 1980 after buying a private hospital. The Hospitals Amendment Act was later invalidated on technical grounds. In response to the closure of AMAC, abortion rights activists established the Sisters Overseas Service (SOS), which helped women travel to Australia for abortion operations in 1978 and 1979. McCulloch estimates that SOS chapters across New Zealand including Auckland and Wellington sent between 4,000 and 4,500 women to Australia for abortion operations during that period. National Party MP Frank Gill later tried to entrench Wall's bill through the Health Amendment Bill 1976 but pro-abortion rights National MP George Gair managed to pass an amendment deferring it by twelve months.

In response to growing public debate around abortion, Parliament set up a Royal Commission on Contraception, Sterilisation and Abortion to consider public policy on these issues. At the Commission's recommendations, the Third National Government passed the Contraception, Sterilisation, and Abortion Act 1977 (CS&A Act 1977) on 15 December 1977, which established the legal framework for abortion in New Zealand. Under the CS&A Act, a woman seeking abortion had to see their doctor and the two medical consultants, who would assess the mental and physical grounds for carrying out an abortion. A surgeon would also be needed to perform an abortion. Counselling was also made available to women seeking an abortion. The CS&A Act also established an Abortion Supervisory Committee to regulate the certifying consultants responsible for permitting abortions. The Act also required district health boards to fund abortions. During the late 1970s and 1980s, several public and private abortion clinics were opened in Auckland, Wellington, and Christchurch.

The CS&A Act was criticised by the feminist group Campaign to Oppose Repressive Abortion Laws (CORAL) and WONAAC as being too restrictive and infringing on women's reproductive rights. In 1977, the Government also amended the Crimes Act 1961 to allow abortion within the 20 weeks gestation period. After 20 weeks, abortion was permitted on the grounds of saving the mother's life and preventing serious permanent injury to her mental and physical health. In 1978, the Government further amended the Crimes Act to permit abortion on the grounds of saving the mother's life, mental health, and physical health; foetal abnormality within the 20 weeks gestation period; and incest or sexual intercourse with guardians and family members. In 1986, the Crimes Act was further amended to take into account factors like the extremes of age and sexual violation.

=== Post decriminalisation, 1977–1990s ===
Following the decriminalisation of abortion, ALRANZ lobbied several hospital boards into establishing more abortion clinics and services. In November 1978, Epsom Day clinic opened in Auckland in November 1978. This was followed by the establishment of Wellington's Parkview Clinic in July 1980 and Christchurch's Lyndhurst Hospital in January 1986. Together with AMAC, these three clinics have provided the vast majority of abortions in New Zealand. ALRANZ and other abortion rights groups shifted their attention to lobbying for sex education in schools and easing young people's access to contraceptives. In response, anti-abortion activists and groups picketed abortion clinics and joined forces with socially-conservative moral groups including Moral Rearmament, Family Rights Association, Society for the Protection of Community Standards (SPCS), and "Family 75" during the late 1970s and 1980s.

SPUC was at the forefront of opposing abortion during the 1980s. In 1980, SPUC secured the removal of two members of the Abortion Supervisory Committee on the grounds that they had been promoting abortion by encouraging hospital boards to establish abortion services. That same year, two SPUC–backed candidates were elected to the Wellington hospital board. In 1981, the president of SPUC's Dunedin branch, John O'Neill sought injunctions on behalf of men who wanted to stop their lovers or partners from having abortions. In three of these cases, the women involved managed to obtain their abortions before the courts could intervene. When a judge imposed an interim injunction against an abortion an hour after it had taken place, WONAAC and Alranz staged a protest outside the Court of Appeal in Wellington to protest the judge's action. In 1982, SPUC also unsuccessfully lobbied for all foetuses to be officially registered in the national Registrar of Births, Deaths, and Marriages.

In 1982, a New Plymouth paediatrician Melvyn Wall sought a judicial review of a decision by two certifying consultants to allow an abortion for a fifteen-year-old girl, alleging that they had acted in "bad faith". Wall's motion was dismissed on the grounds that he had no right to mount the challenge and that decisions by certifying consultants were deemed not open to review, and because embryos and fetuses were not statutorily defined within the Contraception Sterilisation and Abortion Act 1977 or any of the Crimes Act 1961 clauses related to abortion. While SPUC's President Marilyn Pryor regarded Wall vs. Livingston as a major loss for anti-abortion advocates, ALRANZ welcomed the ruling for upholding women's access to abortion services. WONAAC also successfully appealed to the Medical Practitioners' Disciplinary Committee for Wall to be censured on the grounds that he had violated patient confidentiality. Wall was also fined NZ$1,500. While Wall had the censure revoked, the Medical Council found him liable for professional misconduct and added $500 in costs to the original amount.

In 1983, National Member of Parliament Doug Kidd, with the support of SPUC, introduced a private member's bill called the Status of the Unborn Child Bill. In response, the feminist National Member of Parliament Marilyn Waring introduced the pro-abortion rights Contraception, Sterilisation and Abortion Repeal Bill to challenge Kidd's bill. Waring also leaked news about Kidd's affair with a parliamentary secretary to WONAAC. Ultimately, both Kidd and Waring's bills were defeated and no changes were made to existing abortion legislation. While Pryor blamed the Status of the Unborn Child Bill's hasty introduction for its defeat, abortion rights journalist Alison McCulloch has attributed the bill's defeat to both Waring's counter-bill and Kidd's affair.

In 1987, O'Neill of SPUC appeared before the New Zealand Parliament's Justice and Law Reform Committee and demanded the dismissal of the Abortion Supervisory Committee (including the two SPUC–backed members) on the grounds they had failed to carry out their functions. That same year, Leo Buchanan, the medical superintendent of Masterton hospital refused to apply for a renewal of the hospital's license to provide abortion services, citing his conscientious objection to abortion. Buchanan's actions effectively ended abortion services in the Wairarapa region. In 1991, O'Neill challenged the validity of abortion licenses throughout New Zealand, leading to the temporary suspension of abortion operations in Dunedin and Waikato for several days. The Otago Health Board's abortion license was suspended on the grounds of a legal technicality connected with the change from the Hospitals Act 1975 to the Area Health Boards Act.

During the late 1980s, WONAAC unsuccessfully lobbied several feminist MPs including Sonja Davies and the Minister of Women's Affairs Margaret Shields for a more liberal abortion law in the form of a private member's bill. However, the Fourth Labour Government thought there was insufficient support for further abortion reform and instead passed the Contraceptive, Sterilisation and Abortion Amendment Act 1990, which eliminated the restriction on who could educate and provide services and supplies. The–then Health Minister and future Prime Minister Helen Clark sponsored the CS&A Amendment Act.

During the late 1980s and early 1990s, an anti-abortion group called Operation Rescue New Zealand was active, modeling itself after the American-based Randall Terry's Operation Rescue organisation. Operation Rescue used aggressive clinics including picketing abortion clinics, remonstrating with abortion patients, breaking into buildings and operation theatres to disrupt operations, and distributing leaflets attacking abortion practitioners as "baby killers". Operation Rescue was also criticised for its aggressive tactics by the anti-abortion movement with Women for Live's president Anettta Moran rejecting the group's willingness to break the law. While SPUC's leadership was initially critical of Operation Rescue NZ, the leadership subsequently relented and allowed SPUC members to participate. Operation Rescue NZ had a large Catholic component including priests and clergy. According to McCulloch, an estimated half of Operation Rescue's supporters were also SPUC members. Operation Rescue's activities also attracted counter-protests from WONAAC and the Wellington-based group Choice.

=== Into the 21st century ===
==== Attempts at abortion law reform, 1999–2001 ====
In 1999, the Abortion Supervisory Committee's annual report criticised MPs for using it as a buffer between them and abortion interest groups, allowing them to abrogate their responsibilities. In response to that report, the newly-formed Fifth Labour Government, which was in coalition with the Alliance party, made attempts to reform New Zealand's abortion laws. After several months of preparatory work, the Cabinet agreed to amend the Contraception, Sterilisation and Abortion Act 1977 in July 2001 to allow one doctor to approve an abortion. The Cabinet also submitted a Supplementary Order Paper exploring the grounds for abortion, possible decriminalisation, and the abolition of the Abortion Supervisory Committee. However, this plan was scuttled due to growing troubles within the Labour–Alliance coalition government.

==== Introducing medical abortions, 2002–2003 ====
Former ALRANZ president Margaret Sparrow established a non-profit company called Istar to import mifepristone (formerly known as RU 486), a pill used in medical abortions to cause the embryo to dislodge from the uterine wall, and a prostaglandin supplement to expel the remains. In 2002, Istar convinced the Abortion Supervisory Committee to seek a Court ruling on how the CS&A Act 1977 applied to the use of mifepristone. In April 2003, Justice Durie ruled that women seeking medical abortions must take medications in a licensed facility but need not remain there between taking the two sets of tablets, which are taken 48 hours apart. Women also need not stay in the facility until the expulsion of the foetus completes the abortion.

==== 2004 Parental notification amendment bill ====
In 2004, the Fifth Labour Government passed the Care of Children Act 2004 which allows a girl under the age of 16 to seek an abortion through the framework of the CS&A Act 1977. That same year, National Party MP Judith Collins, with the support of anti-abortion lobby group Voice for Life (formerly SPUC), proposed an amendment to that law requiring anyone under 16 years of age to notify their parents before having an abortion. Collins was opposed by ALRANZ, the New Zealand Medical Association and New Zealand College of General Practitioners.

A NZ Herald Digipoll showed that 71% of New Zealanders believed parents should be informed about whether or not their child was to have an abortion, with 60% believing this should be legally mandatory. This "parental notification" legislation was heavily defeated, as the New Zealand Medical Association and New Zealand College of General Practitioners objected that the abrogation of medical confidentiality would endanger pregnant incest survivors, and/or those within similar dysfunctional families and abusive parents.

==== 2008 informed consent amendment bill ====
During the 48th New Zealand Parliament, former Kiwi Party list MP Gordon Copeland placed a members bill, the Contraception, Sterilisation and Abortion (Informed Consent) Amendment Bill, in the ballot. It was based on an Australian Capital Territory 'informed consent' piece of legislation, since repealed. It was not drawn from the ballot, but in April 2008 Copeland sought to introduce it for consideration by leave, which he did not receive. Copeland has since been voted out of Parliament, as he did not secure a constituency seat at the New Zealand general election held in 2008 and his Kiwi Party polled well under the five percent threshold under the MMP framework in the Electoral Act 1993. Copeland died in August 2018

==== Chadwick's proposed amendment, 2010 ====
In July 2010, Labour MP Steve Chadwick proposed an Abortion Reform Bill to take abortion out of the Crimes Act 1961. The anti-abortion organisation Voice for Life opposed the Bill while ALRANZ supported it. Due to fierce opposition from anti-abortion opponents and a lack of sufficient parliamentary support, Chadwick was unable to get the numbers to put her Bill into ballot. Even the progressive Green Party of Aotearoa New Zealand declined to issue a public statement supporting Chadwick's bill. After Chadwick lost her seat in Parliament in the 2011 general election, she lamented the weakened state of the abortion rights movement in New Zealand and opined that change was only possible if the New Zealand Law Commission produced recommendations that any government would touch upon.

==== Challenges to abortion, 2009–2012 ====
In 2009, the anti-abortion group Right to Life New Zealand launched a court case against the Abortion Supervisory Committee, accusing it of not sufficiently regulating abortion by allowing broad interpretation of the mental health exception. A High Court decision supported some of Right to Life New Zealand's points, finding that there was de facto abortion on demand. However, the Abortion Supervisory Committee appealed this to the New Zealand Court of Appeal.

On 1 June 2011 the Court of Appeal overturned the earlier High Court verdict favouring Right to Life, finding that there was no statutory reference to embryos and foetuses within New Zealand law, and therefore no grounds for further attempted interference with existing abortion access procedures. It did not, however, overturn the finding that there was de facto abortion on demand in New Zealand. In March 2012, Right to Life appealed to the New Zealand Supreme Court, which dismissed their appeal by a 3–2 majority in August 2012.

On 7 April 2011, during the term of the 49th New Zealand Parliament, Māori Party co-leader Tariana Turia moved that an anti-abortion Pacific Island doctor, Ate Moala, be appointed to the Abortion Supervisory Committee. The vote was lost 70–30 against, with twenty absences or abstentions. That same year, anti-abortion groups successfully campaigned against an attempt by Family Planning New Zealand to introduce early medical abortions at one of its clinics.

==== Renewed abortion reform efforts, 2018 ====
During the 2010s, a wave of international abortion reform law changes led to a renewed campaign by New Zealand abortion rights advocates to decriminalise abortion. ALRANZ and other abortion rights groups argued that abortion was a health and reproductive rights issue that should be removed from the Crimes Act. In 2018, ALRANZ and a group of women who had had abortions filed a case with the Human Rights Commission challenging the existing abortion legal framework in New Zealand.

In late February 2018, the Minister of Justice Andrew Little sought advice from the New Zealand Law Commission on realigning the country's abortion legal framework towards a health approach. The Law Commission also received 3,419 public submissions on abortion law reform between 4 April and 18 May 2018. In late October 2018, the Law Commission proposed three options: having no statutory test to make sure the abortion was appropriate at any point; taking abortion off the Crimes Act but having a statutory test; or only having a test for later-term abortions, after 22 weeks.

==== 2019–2020 abortion reform legislation ====
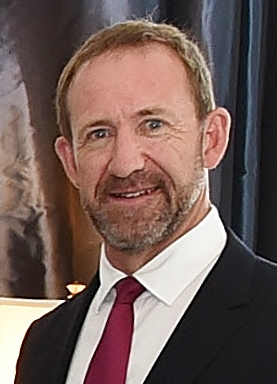
The Abortion Legislation Bill was introduced to Parliament in 2019 by Justice Minister Andrew Little.

On 5 August 2019, the Justice Minister Andrew Little announced that the Government would be introducing new legislation giving women access to abortion for the first 20 weeks of pregnancy without having to navigate legal loopholes and removing abortion from the Crimes Act 1961. However Prime Minister Jacinda Ardern said it was not a government bill.

Other changes included allowing women to self-refer to an abortion service, ensuring that health practitioners advise women about counselling services, establishing safe areas around abortion facilities, and ensuring that conscientious objecting doctors inform women about their stance and alternative services. The Government adopted the Law Commission's third approach for a test on later-term abortions but reduced the time-frame to 20 weeks. The test for late term abortions is contained in section 11 of the proposed bill. Section 11 states that "a qualified health practitioner may provide abortion services to a woman who is more than 20 weeks pregnant only if the health practitioner reasonably believes that the abortion is appropriate in the circumstances..."

A Down syndrome-themed anti-abortion group "Saving Downs" and conservative disability acticvists objected to Section 11 on the grounds that would facilitate the termination of babies with disabilities right through to birth. Both ALRANZ and Family Planning welcomed the proposed changes but criticised the 20-week limit. By contrast, conservative lobby group Family First New Zealand criticised the Government's abortion law reform as "radical... and anti-human rights".

Labour and its coalition partner New Zealand First engaged in several months of negotiations discussing the legislation. The Minister for Children and New Zealand First MP Tracey Martin reportedly played an important part in these negotiations. Despite initially ruling out a referendum, NZ First leader Winston Peters subsequently demanded a binding referendum on abortion reform. In response, Opposition National MP Amy Adams criticised NZ First's U-turn, saying that the matter should be decided by Parliament. Former National Party leader Simon Bridges indicated that he would support a Select Committee examining the bill. Voting for the new legislation was done through a conscience vote. Justice Minister Little ruled out NZ First's calls for holding a referendum on abortion reform. Former National Party leader Bridges voted against abortion reform but allowed National MPs to exercise a conscience vote.

On 8 August, the Abortion Legislation Bill passed its first reading by 94–23 votes and was referred to select committee stage. By October 2019, the Abortion Legislation Committee had received 25,000 submissions from various legal and medical experts, religious groups, national organisations and ordinary people sharing personal experiences. Due to the large volume of submissions, the Committee only heard 150 oral submissions out of the 2,890 who had opted to speak.

In mid-February 2020, the Abortion Legislation Committee recommended safeguards to address sex selection, late-term abortions, eliminating some barriers for women seeking abortions, and requiring a health professional approving abortion after 20 weeks to consult with another health professional including nurses and medical practitioners. In addition, conservative Catholic National MP Agnes Loheni published a minority report criticising the bill for what she regarded as a lack of safeguards on foetal abnormalities and late-term abortions. ACT New Zealand leader David Seymour supported the Select Committee's recommendations but argued that safe zones infringed on freedom of expression.

While the New Zealand Medical Association welcomed these changes, Catholic bishops said that the legislation lacked safeguards for fetuses with disabilities.

On 3 March 2020, the Bill passed its second reading by a narrower margin of 81–39 votes and was referred to a committee of the whole house. On 10 March, a Committee of the Whole House considered and rejected several anti-abortion amendments that included reducing penalties for safe zones, eliminating statutory tests for abortion up to birth, preventing gender-selective abortions, and requiring medical intervention of unintended live births. However, the committee passed two amendments including one by Labour MP Ruth Dyson dealing with conscientious objection and one by ACT Party MP David Seymour eliminating safe zones around abortion clinics.

On 18 March, the Abortion Legislation Bill passed its third and final reading by a margin of 68 to 51. The bill's passage preceded a debate that same day where parliamentarians voted by 100–19 votes against holding a public referendum on abortion.

==== Safe access zone legislation ====
On 10 March 2021, a private members bill, the Contraception, Sterilisation, and Abortion (Safe Areas) Amendment Bill was introduced into the New Zealand Parliament. Its purpose was the creation of safe areas around abortion facilities, on a case-by-case basis, "to protect the safety and well-being, and respect the privacy and dignity, of women accessing abortion facilities and practitioners providing and assisting with abortion services". It passed its first parliamentary reading (100–15), and two more parliamentary readings, as well as transit through a parliamentary select committee that assessed submissions for and against its passage.

On 16 March 2022, the Safe Areas Amendment Act passed into law by a margin of 108 to 12 votes. It received royal assent on 18 March. The Bill created safe spaces of no more than 150 metres around abortion providers. It also banned obstruction, filming in an intimidating manner, dissuading or protesting against those trying to access abortion services in those zones.

== Public opinion and activism ==
In March 2019, 69.9% of respondents to a poll by Newshub supported the decriminalisation of abortion.

=== Abortion rights groups and supporters ===
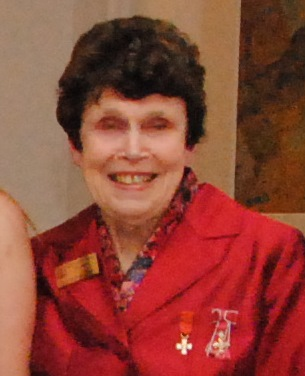
Margaret Sparrow, president of ALRANZ (1975–1980, 1984–2011)

The main abortion rights lobby group is Abortion Law Reform Association of New Zealand (ALRANZ), which favours the complete decriminalisation of abortion in New Zealand. During the 1990s and early 2000s, ALRANZ experienced a steep decline in membership, with ALRANZ's Christchurch and Hawke's Bay branches shutting down in 1996 and 2004. By 2011, ALRANZ's membership had dwindled to around 235 members. Contemporary abortion rights activism focused on defending the status quo from anti-abortionists and lobbying for the legalisation of Mifepristone for use in medical abortions, until decriminalisation finally occurred in 2019. Historical abortion rights lobby groups have included the more radical Women's National Abortion Action Campaign (WONAAC), the Auckland Anti-Hospitals Amendment Bill Committee, the May Abortion Action Committee, and the National Organisation for Women (NOW).

Some professional bodies have also taken a pro-choice position. New Zealand Family Planning (formerly the Family Planning Association) supports abortion laws that respect women's autonomy and human rights. The New Zealand Medical Association supports abortion reform including the removal of abortion from the Crimes Act 1961.

The New Zealand Association of Rationalists and Humanists (NZARH) long advocated the removal of abortion from the Crimes Act 1961, viewing it as a matter of reproductive rights. Amnesty International New Zealand also supported abortion law reform including the removal of abortion from the Crimes Act.

=== Anti-abortion groups and supporters ===
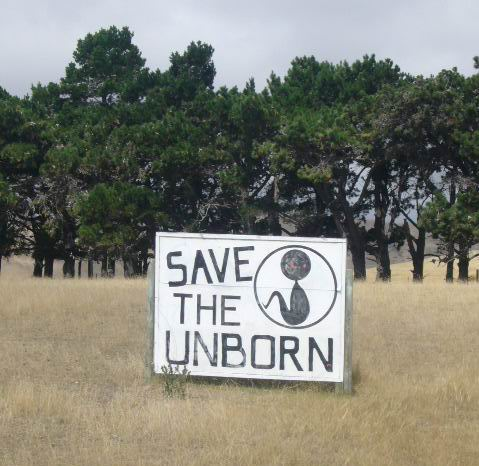
A roadside sign in the South Island advocating anti-abortion.

The first major anti-abortion group in New Zealand was the Society for the Protection of the Unborn Child (SPUC), which was led by Marilyn Pryor. SPUC drew support from the Catholic Church in New Zealand, conservative evangelical Protestant churches and social conservative politicians from the two major parties, Labour and National. By 1975, SPUC had 28 branches and 40,000 members. Policy differences between the national leadership and the Christchurch branch led by Ken Orr led to SPUC's splintering in 2000. The Christchurch branch renamed itself Right to Life New Zealand in September 2000 while the national organisation rebranded itself as Voice for Life in 2004.

Other anti-abortion groups include Family Life International, Family First New Zealand, the youth-based organisation ProLife NZ, Focus on the Family New Zealand. Some of these anti-abortion groups had international connections from which they derived tactics, strategy, rhetoric and messaging and also took an interest in other issues including euthanasia and in vitro fertilisation. These anti-abortion groups were often well-funded. According to McCulloch, Right to Life had an annual income of NZ$25,000 to NZ$35,000 a year during the mid-to-late 2000s; spending NZ$80,000 on its legal challenge against the Abortion Supervisory Committee by May 2009. Some former anti-abortion groups also included Operation Rescue New Zealand, Women for Life, and the Kiwi Party, now all defunct. In 2013, McCulloch has estimated that the anti-abortion movement in New Zealand had tens of thousands of members.

Anti-abortion activism have included picketing abortion clinics and hospitals, targeting doctors and members of the Abortion Supervisory Committee, public booths, newspaper advertisements, distributing informational material, lobbying politicians, letters to the editor, and protests. Operation Rescue NZ drew controversy for its aggressive methods which included invading abortion clinics and operating theatres and sending death threats to abortion practitioners. Anti-abortion groups have also pursued a "Stop Family Planning" campaign reminiscent of similar efforts in the United States against Planned Parenthood. In 2009, former Prolife New Zealand leader Andy Moore created a spoof website using the domain name "alranz.org.nz" which attacked Alranz. After "alranz.org.nz" was shut down by a successful complaint, Moore created a wiki called "AbortionWiki" which targeted ALRANZ and other abortion rights supporters.

In addition, violent militant elements of the anti-abortion movement have also perpetrated arson attacks and bomb threats against abortion clinics. The Auckland Medical Aid Centre experienced several arson attacks in 1976 and 1989. Lyndhurst clinic in Christchurch experienced arson attacks in May 1985 and October 1989. In 1999 Graeme White was jailed for tunneling into Lyndhurst clinic in a failed attempt to blow it up. Epsom Day clinic experienced an arson attack in 1985, a firebombing in April 1987, and a bomb threat in October 1989. These violent attacks on clinics were disavowed by anti-abortion leaders including Marilyn Pryor and Auckland SPUC president John Carroll.

=== Religious denominations and organisations ===
==== Christian ====
The Catholic Church in New Zealand has remained an opponent of abortion, teaching that life begins at conception. The Presbyterian Church of Aotearoa New Zealand has expressed concerns that the Abortion Legislation Act 2020 does not protect foetuses and could lead to sex and disability-selective abortions.

The New Zealand Christian Network takes the view that abortion should be "safe, legal and rare" and opposed Abortion Legislation Bill on the grounds that it does not protect unborn foetuses and would facilitate elective abortion care. The Church of Jesus Christ of Latter-day Saints (LDS Church) opposes elective abortions for personal and social convenience but permits abortion in cases of rape, incest, protecting the life and health of the mother, and fetal deformities. The LDS Church has not taken a stand on legislative proposals and public demonstrations regarding abortion.

Over the last fifty years, according to the New Zealand Census, New Zealand society has substantially secularised. In 2018, the New Zealand Census noted that Christian religious observance occupied less than half of New Zealand's citizenship. Of those, Catholicism and conservative evangelical Protestantism provided even smaller segments.

== Political parties' positions ==
=== ACT Party ===
The libertarian ACT Party views abortion as a personal right for women. In 2019, the party supported reforming New Zealand's abortion laws.

=== Green Party ===
The Green Party of Aotearoa New Zealand supports decriminalising abortion, regarding it as a matter of female autonomy. All Green MPs voted in support of the Abortion Legislation Act 2020

=== Labour Party ===
During New Zealand general election, 2017, the Labour Party's leader Jacinda Ardern said a Labour government would decriminalise abortion. Minister of Justice Andrew Little has also supported abortion reform, arguing that a woman should have the right to decide unless the pregnancy is more than 22 weeks.

Labour Party MPs voted 37 to 9 strongly in favour of the Abortion Legislation Act 2020.

=== National Party ===
In a conscience vote, National Party MPs voted 35 to 19 against the Abortion Legislation Act 2020.

=== NZ First ===
NZ First voted 7 to 2 against the Abortion Legislation Act 2020.

=== New Conservative Party ===
The New Conservative Party, which has never been represented in the New Zealand Parliament, strongly opposed abortion and advocated for parental notification for adolescent abortions.

== Statistics ==
Since 1978, the Abortion Supervisory Committee (ASC) has collected statistics on the numbers of terminations performed each year, and for what reason, under the terms of the Contraception, Sterilisation, and Abortion Act 1977. In 1983, Statistics New Zealand agreed to process abortion statistics on behalf of the ASC and subsequently took over responsibility for releasing abortion-related statistics in 1998. Since abortion was illegal until 1977, there are no exact figures on abortions prior to the 1970s. Megan Cook estimates that 10,000 abortions took place each year during the 1930s, based on statistics relating to the number of women admitted to hospital during that period for septic abortions.

=== Historical figures ===
During the 1970s and 1980s, the abortion rate per woman rose from 0.02 in 1971 to 0.30 by 1986. The number of unmarried women seeking abortions, including those in de facto relationships, also increased. During that period, women aged 24 and younger were more likely to seek abortions than older women. While European New Zealanders were more likely to have an abortion at a younger age to end an unwanted pregnancy, Māori and Pasifika New Zealanders were more likely to use abortion due to lack of access to contraception.

According to figures released by Statistics New Zealand, the number of abortions rose from 8.5 per 1,000 women aged 15–44 years in 1980 to 14 per 1,000 women in 1990. By 2000, this figure had risen to 18.7 per 1,000 women aged 15–44 years but has since declined to 13.5 per 1,000 women as of 2018.

As the annual statistics for the Abortion Supervisory Committee have repeatedly said, mental health grounds are the predominant grounds for most certified abortions in New Zealand. The high numbers of abortions in New Zealand for mental health grounds have led anti-abortionists to express concerns that the mental health exception is being used to allow abortion on demand. By contrast, ALRANZ says that successive abortion-related case law has preserved the status quo of partial decriminalisation and liberal terms of abortion access for most New Zealand women who need an abortion.

=== 2018 abortion statistics ===
According to Statistics New Zealand, 13,282 induced abortions had been performed in New Zealand in 2018. There were 13.5 abortions per 1,000 women aged 15–44 years in 2018, down from 13.7 per 1,000 women in 2017. Split amongst ethnicity in 2018, the highest rates were among European women (7,567), followed by Māori (2,979), Asian women (2,789), and Pacific women (1,354), and MELAA (or Middle Eastern, Latin American, and African) (215).

In 2017, New Zealand's abortion rate of 13.7 per 1,000 women aged 15–44 years was similar to the United States (13.5), South Australia (13.2 in 2016). This is below England and Wales (17.0), France (17.2), and Sweden (19.8) but higher than Germany (7.1), Finland (9.6), Scotland (12.1), and Norway (12.5).

== See also ==
- Healthcare in New Zealand
- Contraceptive rights in New Zealand
- Sisters Overseas Service
