= Alice Bush =

Doctor, paediatrician, family planning activist

Alice Mary Bush (née Stanton, 7 August 1914 – 12 February 1974) was a pioneering New Zealand female physician, paediatrician and activist for family planning services and abortion access.

== Early life and education ==
Bush was born in 1914, the first daughter of lawyer Sir Joseph Stanton and Marjorie McMaster. She had two brothers and two sisters and the family lived in Mountain Road, Epsom. She attended Hill Top School and Diocesan School for Girls. Bush wanted to be a doctor from an early age. After one year's study at Auckland University College Bush entered the Otago Medical School at the University of Otago, Dunedin, in 1933, and completed her MB and ChB in 1937. At medical school she received the Scott Medal for knowledge of human anatomy but being female was not offered the position of graduate demonstrator in anatomy which was awarded to medal holders. She participated in wider student life in the Women's Students Club, Medical Debating Society and Student's Association.

== Medical career ==
In 1938, she was appointed a house surgeon at Auckland Hospital. To take up the appointment she had to obtain permission to live at home in Mountain Road as there was no suitable accommodation at the hospital for female staff. From 1939 to 1940 she was senior house surgeon at New Plymouth Hospital. In 1940 Bush took over the practice of Dr Edward Sayers when he went to serve in World War II. He specialised in parasitology, infectious diseases and the treatment of allergies and asthma and was on the medical staff of Auckland's Truby King Karitane Hospital and Mothercraft Care facility. Bush joined the Karitane staff remaining there until her death. When Sayers returned in 1944 he and Bush practiced in partnership and she also was appointed to a position in the paediatric ward at Auckland Hospital, which she needed to qualify in paediatrics. From 1947 to 1950 she lived in London, where she served as a doctor at the Great Ormond Street Hospital For Sick Children and studied for a Diploma in Child Health.

On her return to New Zealand Bush became a paediatric physician at Auckland Hospital, continued on the medical staff of Karitane Hospital and set up her own private practice in paediatrics and the treatment of allergies and asthma.

During the 1940s–50s Bush gained a number of professional qualifications. She became a member of the Royal Australasian College of Physicians in 1946 and in 1955 was the first New Zealand woman to become a Fellow of the college. In 1949 she gained her membership of the Royal College of Physicians, MRCP; she became an FRCP in 1970, again the first New Zealand woman to do so.

In the forties, Bush also became involved in medical politics. She joined a study group formed by Douglas Robb and was co-author of a document that recommended A National Health Service (1943) for New Zealand. She also served as Secretary (1945–1946) and President (1948, 1953) of the Auckland branch of the New Zealand Medical Women's Association. In 1947 Bush was one of the founders of the Paediatric Society. She became a lecturer for the YWCA on sex education, particularly the topics of venereal disease and extra-marital pregnancy. She wrote a booklet Personal Relationships (1944) as a result of her lectures.

Bush gave family planning assistance to the Ōtara Māori Committee in the late 1960s and was made an honorary tohunga of Ōtara. She was active in a number of other organisations which supported women and children or other health issues: Zonta Club of Auckland, the National Council of Women, Playcentre Association, Parents Centre, New Zealand Speech Therapists Association, the Auckland Asthma Society and the International Planned Parenthood Federation.

== Family planning and abortion activism ==
In the late forties, Bush also became involved with the New Zealand Family Planning Association, helping to provide respectability to an organisation that still proved controversial, given its role in publicising and distributing contraception. She served on its board (1947) and chaired its medical advisory committee (1960), before serving as liaison with the New Zealand Medical Association and clearing the way for clinic work with doctors before New Zealand approved use and distribution of the contraceptive pill (1961). Her role is chronicled in Helen Smythe's history of the Family Planning Association. Bush's biographer, Faye Hercock, also noted that she was concerned about the rise in backstreet abortions and displayed considerable impatience with the conservatism of her male colleagues in her later years when it came to access to safe, legal and affordable abortion in New Zealand. Over time, Bush gradually radicalised her position and became one of the founders of the Abortion Law Reform Association of New Zealand. At the time she died, in 1974, the private Auckland Medical Aid Centre had just opened, providing a free-standing dedicated abortion clinic for the first time in New Zealand.

== Personal life ==
Bush met her husband Faulkner Bush in New Plymouth in 1939. They married in Auckland on 17 August 1941 in the Diocesan School chapel. Faulkner served in the army in World War II in the medical corps and Second New Zealand Expeditionary Force. He was a teacher and became headmaster of Avondale Primary School in 1964. The couple had two children.

Bush had a myocardial infarction in 1973 and subsequently angina. She died in 1974 at Auckland Hospital.

== Legacy ==
The Alice Bush Memorial Prize is awarded for the best performance in paediatrics at the University of Auckland medical school.

Bush was known for her commitment to paediatrics, and her activities in many areas of child health and family well-being. She believed a child's early emotional and physical environment were crucial to improve society and that sub-optimal health in children was problematic. Her tireless work to help others contributed to her own ill-health.

== Selected publications ==
- A national health service (1943)
- Personal relationships (1944)
- 'Doctor and the delinquent'. New Zealand Medical Journal 60: 60–64 (1961)
- 'Unhappy child'. New Zealand Medical Journal 61: 85–87 (1962)
- 'Evaluation of methacycline hydrochloride'. New Zealand Medical Journal 66: 240–243 (1967)
- 'Allergy over a quarter century'. New Zealand Medical Journal 68: 101–103 (1968)
- 'Family planning as seen by the paediatrician'. Choice 10, no. 1: 11–13 (1972)
