= Elizabeth Sewell (activist) =

New Zealand activist

Elizabeth Sewell (1940–1988) was a New Zealand activist in the feminist movement in the 1970s and 1980s. She was the first head of the Ministry for Consumer Affairs.

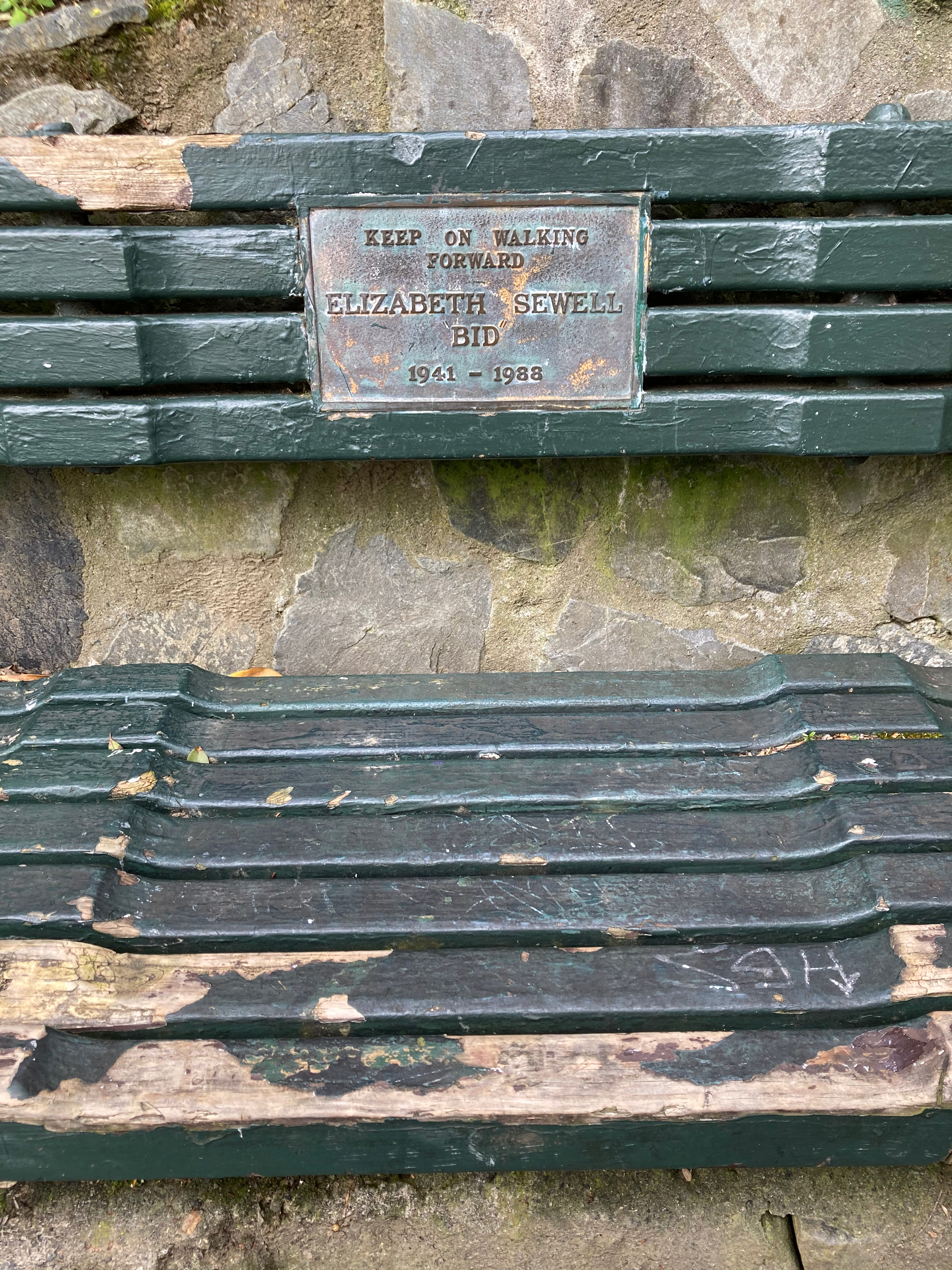
Memorial seat, Dixon St, Wellington

== Career ==
Sewell was a manufacturing jeweller and feminist in Christchurch setting up the Pregnancy Advisory Service in 1974. She was instrumental in the creation and operation of the Christchurch office of Sisters Overseas Service (SOS), an organisation which supported women to travel to Sydney for abortions in the late 1970s. She supervised two paid employees and volunteers as well as handling publicity and counselling of women. She was one of the organisers of the 1977 United Women's Convention, moving to Wellington in 1979 to become a researcher and private secretary to the Member of Parliament Marilyn Waring.

In the early 1980s she was National Executive Director of the Young Women's Christian Association (YWCA) as well as being active in the Women's Electoral Lobby (WEL).

In 1986 she became the first General Manager of the newly formed Ministry of Consumer Affairs where she strove to move consumer affairs closer to the community and have government recognise the work of the Citizens Advice Bureaus. She also worked to improve Standards for the consumer and addressed the International Organization for Standardization in Toronto in 1987.

== Personal life ==
Sewell was divorced after being married for ten years and had three children.
