= Sisters Overseas Service =

New Zealand abortion service in the 1970s

Sisters Overseas Service (SOS) was a New Zealand organisation that helped women travel to Australia to obtain abortions in the 1970s and early 1980s. It was founded in response to the restrictions imposed by the Contraception, Sterlisation, and Abortion Act 1977. SOS arranged for women from all parts of New Zealand to travel to Australian abortion clinics as well as helping to fund women's travel. By 1979 the law was interpreted more liberally reducing the need for the services of SOS.

== History ==
The Contraception, Sterilisation, and Abortion Act 1977 passed into legislation on 15 December 1977, making New Zealand abortion law more restrictive and legal abortions virtually inaccessible. In early 1978 a feminist-launched petition called for parliament to repeal the 1977 act but it was not presented to parliament. In response to the law change groups of women banded together to form SOS. SOS provided counselling and support and made arrangements for women to travel to Australian clinics for safe, legal abortions.

The Auckland, Wellington and Christchurch SOS groups were set up within days of the legislation being passed.

The Auckland branch, began operation the day after the legislation was passed. It was initially run by volunteers but also had full-time staff: Joss Shawyer, Megan Grant and Sharyn Cederman. The Auckland office received up to 60 phone calls and 20 visits from women each day. One in 10 women needed help with money; as funds were low women were advised to try and raise the $510 needed. Shawyer also accompanied women who went to Australia for abortions.

Elizabeth Sewell founded SOS in Christchurch. Sewell supervised 2 staff and 20 volunteers, organised publicity and personally counselled women. At its peak SOS in Christchurch received 20 calls a day from women seeking assistance.

In Wellington an SOS branch formed on 20 December 1977. The local organiser was Leigh Minnitt, and she, Dr Carol Shand, Wendy Norman and a lawyer administered a trust which received donations from people wanting to help women “left in the lurch”. Margaret Sparrow and Leigh Minnitt organised telephone volunteers, billets for women requiring accommodation before flying to Australia, transport, flights, funds and phone calls to Australian clinics.

On Easter Monday in 1978 (27 March 1978) the SOS office in New St, Auckland was destroyed in an arson attack.

Broadsheet magazine listed SOS contacts. In June 1980 there were branches in the following places: Auckland, Christchurch, Dunedin, Gisborne, Hamilton, Invercargill, Blenheim, Naper/Hastings, Nelson, New Plymouth, Palmerston North, Rotorua, Taupo, Tauranga, Whakatane, Wellington.

By 1979 changes to the 1977 Act made it more workable and interpretation of the law was liberalised. Facilities offering abortions opened and by 1981 flights to Australia virtually ceased.

== Achievements ==
The Auckland branch of SOS sent the first woman to Sydney on 21 December 1977, six days after the legislation was passed. The women had to pay their own airfares but SOS would meet the cost of the abortion itself which was about $120.

SOS sent 177 women in January 1978 with 111 women booked for February. Figures gathered in January 1978 from the major clinics in Australia indicated that at least 16 New Zealand women a day were having abortions. The majority SOS of referrals were sent to the Sydney feminist Control Abortion Referral Service but others went to Melbourne and elsewhere. The ages of the women ranged from 14 to 45 and they came from all parts of New Zealand.

By September 1978 some 1000 women had used the service.

== SOS in literature ==
The events in the life of the main character in Sue Orr's novel Loop Tracks (2021) were inspired by a friend who had used SOS in the late 1970s.

== See also ==
- Abortion in New Zealand
