= Conscientious objection to abortion =

Right of medical staff to refuse participation in abortion

Conscientious objection to abortion is the right of medical staff to refuse participation in abortion for reasons of personal opposition to abortion on moral grounds.

== By country ==
=== Europe ===
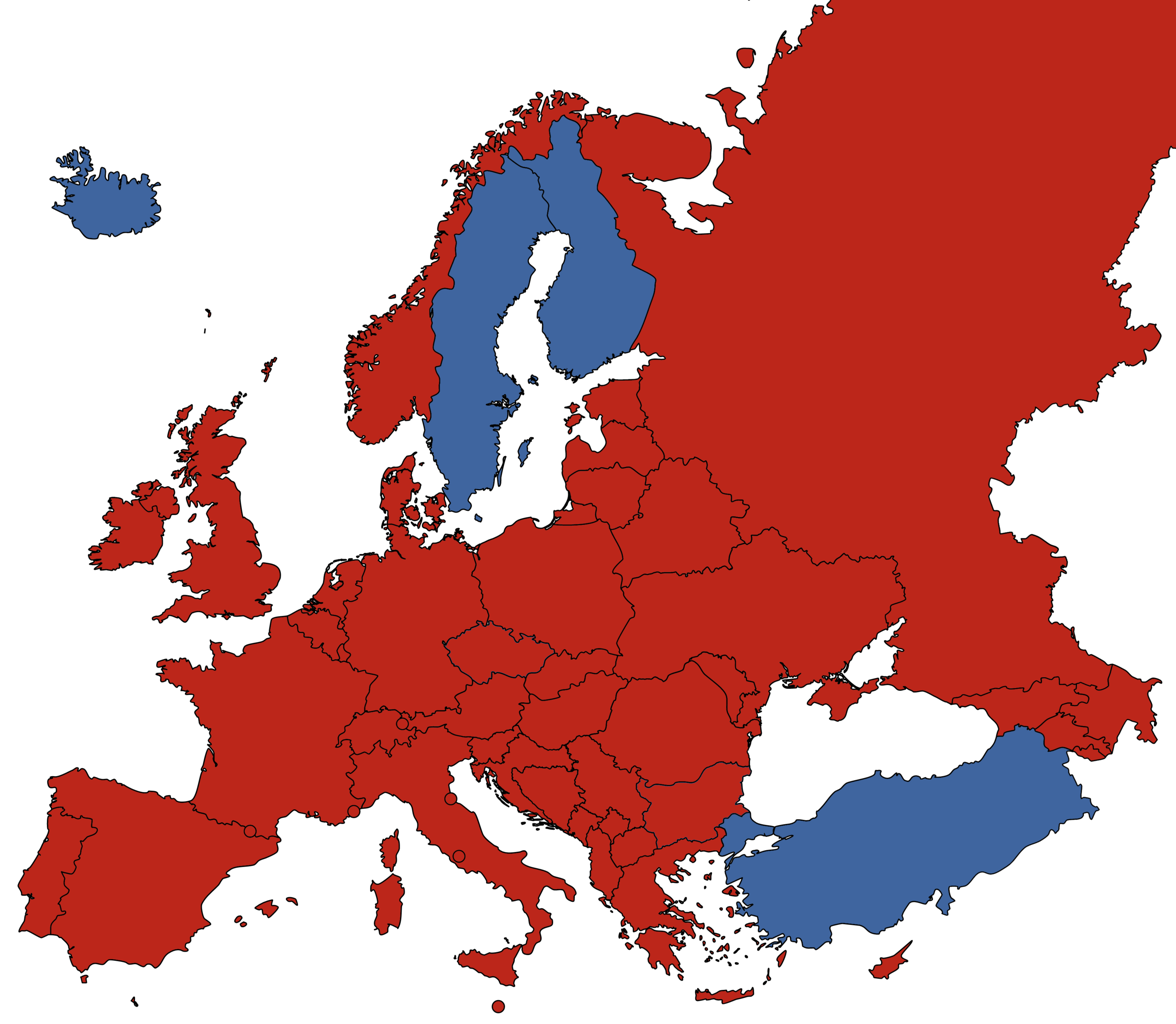
Legal framework for the conscientious objection to abortion in Europe as of December 5, 2020 Conscientious objection to abortion not allowed Conscientious objection to abortion allowed

Conscientious objection is granted in 25 member states of the European Union plus the United Kingdom, Norway and Switzerland. It is not granted in Sweden, Finland, Iceland, or Turkey. The right of member states to enact legislation that limit the right to conscientious objection to abortion was upheld by the European Court of Human Rights in March 2020.

==== Croatia ====
Doctors and other medical personnel have the right to conscientious objection. Rada Borić (Women's Network Croatia) has argued that it is given more prominence than the women's right to abortion, thus making it difficult. On February 21, 2017, the Constitutional Court ordered the Parliament to enact new abortion law within two years, introducing educational and preventive measures to make abortion an exception and not a rule, and to regulate conscientious objection.

==== Czech Republic ====
In the Czech Republic since 2011, doctors and medical personnel can choose not to provide abortion care or prescribe any contraceptive (called Výhrada svědomí). However, if a doctor refuses to provide abortion care they have to refer the patient to another doctor who can.

==== Hungary ====
In 2013, the Committee on the Elimination of Discrimination against Women of the United Nations expressed concern about "the increasing resort to conscientious objection by health professionals in the absence of an adequate regulatory framework."

==== Ireland ====
Under section 22 of the Health (Regulation of Termination of Pregnancy) Act 2018, medical practitioners, nurses and midwives have the right not to participate in abortions, except when there is a risk to life or health of the pregnant woman in emergency. They also have to make arrangements to enable the woman to get an abortion.

==== Italy ====
The law gives the option for health professionals to claim the right to refuse to perform abortion. If the health personnel demands to be conscientious objector, they have to declare it in advance (Art.9). However, conscientious objection may not be invoked by health professionals if the personal intervention is essential in order to save the life of a woman in imminent danger.

Italy keeps a record of the objecting doctors. According to data from the Ministry of Health, between 1997 and 2016 there was a 12.9% increase in the number of gynecologists who refuse to perform abortions on moral grounds, from 62.8% to 70.9%, the highest percentage ever recorded. As of 2016 the percentage is higher than the national average in Southern Italy (83.5%) and Sicily and Sardinia (77.7%), and lower in Central (70.1%) and Northern Italy (63.9%). The percentage is growing in all the macroregions except the North. As a result, voluntary abortion is performed only in 60% of the hospitals of the country. Also, non-objecting doctors suffer discrimination, and -in some provinces- needs to perform record-numbers of abortions, up to 15.8 per week in the province of Taranto (Apulia) or 12.2 in the province of Catania (Sicily).

A resolution by the Council of Europe has found several violations of the European Social Charter in the situation:

- right to protection of health (art. 11) of women seeking abortion;
- right to work (art. 1) and to dignity at work (art. 26) of non-objecting medical practitioners, because of different treatment and moral harassment.

==== Poland ====
The Constitutional Tribunal "abolished a requirement that medical professionals who refuse to provide health services refer patients to an alternate medical provider".

==== Portugal ====
Abortion was legalised in Portugal in 2007. The law allows conscientious objection and many doctors refuse to perform abortion, making it difficult for women to access it.

==== United Kingdom ====
In England and Wales and Scotland, medical staff has the right to refuse to participate in abortion because of conscientious objection. Section 4 of the Abortion Act 1967 (which does not extend in Northern Ireland, where abortion is prohibited under most circumstances) states:

(1) Subject to subsection (2) of this section, no person shall be under any duty, whether by contract or by any statutory or other legal requirement, to participate in any treatment authorised by this Act to which he has a conscientious objection:

Provided that in any legal proceedings the burden of proof of conscientious objection shall rest on the person claiming to rely on it.
(2) Nothing in subsection (1) of this section shall affect any duty to participate in treatment which is necessary to save the life or to prevent grave permanent injury to the physical or mental health of a pregnant woman.

(3) In any proceedings before a court in Scotland, a statement on oath by any person to the effect that he has a conscientious objection to participating in any treatment authorised by this Act shall be sufficient evidence for the purpose of discharging the burden of proof imposed upon him by subsection (1) of this section.

=== Oceania ===
==== New Zealand ====
In New Zealand, Conscientious Objection in Abortion is supported by legislation and employment was protected against discrimination, however, in 2020, this protection was partially removed where it causes unreasonable disruption to an employers services.

== See also ==
- Conscientious objector
