= Royal Commission on Contraception, Sterilisation and Abortion =

The Royal Commission on Contraception, Sterilisation and Abortion was carried out in New Zealand from 1975 to 1977, shortly after the 1975 general election. The members of the Royal Commission were M. D. Matich, Barbara J. Thomson, Dame Dorothy Winstone, Duncan McMullin (chair), Denese Henare and M. R. McGregor.

Shortly after the release of the report the Government passed the Contraception, Sterilisation, and Abortion Act 1977.

== See also ==
- Abortion in New Zealand
