= Right to Life New Zealand =

New Zealand anti-abortion group

Right to Life New Zealand is a nationwide, Christchurch-based anti-abortion group. It broke away from the New Zealand Society for Protection of the Unborn Child (now Voice for Life) in 2000 following disagreements between the Christchurch branch spokesperson Ken Orr and the national leadership over lobbying tactics. Besides opposing abortion, Right to Life NZ opposes euthanasia, sex education, and specific policies around LGBT issues.

== History ==
=== Origins ===
Right to Life originated as the Christchurch branch of the New Zealand Society for the Protection of the Unborn Child (SPUC), now known as Voice for Life. In 2000, the Christchurch branch of SPUC was expelled from the national organisation due to disagreements between the executive of the Christchurch branch and the national organisation over lobbying tactics. While the Christchurch branch wanted to push for anti-abortion legislation, the national leadership wanted to wait for a strongly anti-abortion government. In September 2000, the Christchurch branch of SPUC formerly revamped itself as Right to Life New Zealand.

=== Nikki's Case, 2002 ===
In 2002, Right to Life won a court case known as "Nikki's Case" in which a fetus was made a ward of the court after the mother decided to allow the birth to be filmed for a pornographic movie. According to journalist Allison McCulloch, this court challenge was part of Right to Life's campaign to enshrine the right to life from conception in New Zealand law.

=== Legal proceedings against the Abortion Supervisory Committee, 2008–2011 ===
Between 2005 and 2012, Right to Life New Zealand's leader Ken Orr pursued a court case against the Abortion Supervisory Committee, New Zealand's abortion regulator since 2005, arguing that the Committee had failed in its statutory responsibility to monitor the legality of individual certifying consultant responsibilities under the Contraception, Sterilisation and Abortion Act 1977, protect fetuses, and stop elective abortions. In 2008, Right to Life's case was upheld in part by Miller J, however he refused to issue a declaration that the Committee had failed in its duty.

On appeal, the Court of Appeal found against Right to Life on 1 June 2011. It dismissed their case against the Committee and upheld Wall v Livingston, an earlier Court of Appeal case that found that there was no statutory definition of embryo or fetus under New Zealand law in the context of abortion. The Court of Appeal also ruled that there was no fetal right to life.

Right to Life New Zealand Inc sought leave to appeal to the Supreme Court of New Zealand. In a decision on 26 August 2011 the Supreme Court granted Right to Life New Zealand Inc leave to appeal in relation to certain issues (including regarding the powers of the Abortion Supervisory Committee), but declined leave to appeal regarding the issues of the rights of the unborn child and independent counselling for women.

The appeal was heard in the Supreme Court on 13 March 2012. The Supreme Court delivered its judgment on 9 August 2012, declining Right to Life's appeal by a 3-2 majority decision and upholding the Wall v. Livingston decision. The Court ruled that the Abortion Supervisory Committee could not investigate the decision-making of certifying consultants in individual cases but also made it clear that the ASC could ask consultants how they were making their decisions in general. Orr claimed the latter ruling as a victory in holding consultants accountable for abortions that they authorised. Right to Life Inc applied to recall that part of the judgment which dealt with costs, but the recall application was declined by the Supreme Court on 25 October 2012.

=== Recent campaigns ===
Since 2017, Right to Life New Zealand has also opposed efforts to legalise euthanasia and assisted suicide. As of 2019, the group is lobbying against ACT Party leader David Seymour's proposed End of Life Choice Bill, which passed its second reading in late June 2019. In addition, Right to Life also opposes contraception, In vitro fertilisation, and prenatal testing.

=== Decriminalisation of Abortion: March 2020 ===
In August 2019, Right to Life NZ urged supporters to make submissions opposing the Labour-led coalition government's proposed Abortion Legislation Act 2020, which intends to remove abortion from the Crimes Act 1961 and ease access to termination services. However, it failed to achieve that objective after the third and final reading of the Abortion Legislation Act on 23 March, 2020, after which it became law. Nor was Right to Life New Zealand any more successful in its concurrent campaign against the End of Life Choice Act 2019, which sought to ratify the decriminalisation of voluntary euthanasia. The End of Life Choice Act passed after a binding referendum was held alongside the New Zealand general election 2020 by a margin of 65.9% (support) compared to 34.1% (opposed).

== See also ==
- Abortion in New Zealand
- Christian politics in New Zealand
- Euthanasia in New Zealand
