= Dorothy Winstone =

New Zealand academic and educator

Dame Dorothy Gertrude Winstone DBE CMG (née Fowler, 23 January 1919 – 3 April 2014) was a New Zealand educationist and academic. She sat on the Royal Commission on Contraception, Sterilisation and Abortion which ran from 1975 to 1977.

The Dorothy Winstone Centre Theatre at the Auckland Girls' Grammar School in Auckland, New Zealand is named in her honour. The theatre was built in 1988 and designed by architect Ivan Mercep.

Winstone was appointed a Companion of the Order of St Michael and St George, for public services, in the 1977 New Year Honours. In the 1990 Queen's Birthday Honours, she was appointed a Dame Commander of the Order of the British Empire, for services to the community. In 1993, Winstone was awarded the New Zealand Suffrage Centennial Medal.

Winstone died on 3 April 2014. Her ashes were buried at Purewa Cemetery, Auckland.
