= Margaret Sparrow =

New Zealand doctor, activist and author

Dame Margaret Sparrow DNZM MBE
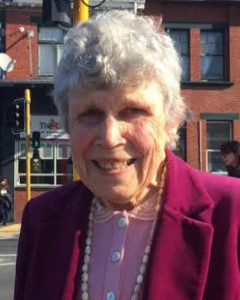
- Born: Margaret June Muir; 26 June 1935 (age 91); Inglewood, New Zealand
- Known for: Campaigning for reproductive rights
- Spouse: Peter Charles Methven Sparrow (m. 1956; died 1982)
- Children: 2

Dame Margaret June Sparrow DNZM MBE (née Muir, born 26 June 1935) is a New Zealand medical doctor, reproductive rights advocate, and author.

== Early life, family, and education ==
Sparrow was born in Inglewood on 26 June 1935 to Daniel James Muir and Jessie Isobel Muir (née McMillan), and was educated at Waitara District High School and New Plymouth Girls' High School. She went on to study at Victoria University College from 1953 to 1955, graduating BSc; the University of Otago from 1957 to 1963, from where she graduated MB ChB; and the University of London, where she completed a Diploma in Venereology in 1976.

In 1956, she married Peter Charles Methven Sparrow, and the couple went on to have two children. Peter Sparrow died in 1982.

In 1955, Margaret, Peter and her father Daniel were involved in a car crash, in which she fractured her pelvis. While still recovering from her injury in 1956, she discovered her contraceptive diaphragm had failed and she had become pregnant. Her injury, alongside her being the couple's only breadwinner and her desire to prioritise her career meant she did not want children at this point - causing her to undertake an illegal abortion with the help of George Bettle, a well known chemist in Christchurch.

== Career ==
Sparrow initially started her career in health working as a public health educator for the Health Department, a role which included sex education in schools. In 1969, she began to work as a GP at the Student Health Centre at Victoria University of Wellington. At the time, the clinic would only allow contraception to be given to married couples, and she had to go against the wishes of the director of the clinic to put up an information display about contraception. While working at the clinic, student demand for contraception led to her introducing the morning-after pill and helping students to get abortions. She worked as a medical officer at Student Health until 1981.

In 1971, Sparrow joined the Abortion Law Reform Association of New Zealand, becoming president from 1975 to 1980, and again from 1984 until 2011.

In 1976, Sparrow took a sabbatical in the United Kingdom, where she undertook a year long intensive venerology diploma at University of London and the Society of Apothecaries. During her time in London, Sparrow also worked at an abortion clinic run by the Pregnancy Advisory Service, and was trained by Dorothea Kerslake in suction abortion. She also went to India, applying her recent training in a mobile clinic doing vasectomies. On return to New Zealand in 1977, she put this recent training into practice, helping to set up the Parkview Clinic at Wellington Hospital and working as a visiting venereologist there. Sparrow was an operating doctor at the Parkview Clinic from its opening in 1980 until 1997, when she was made redundant after a third-party consultancy group determined her inability to provide certifying consultancy was inefficient.

She is a Director of Istar Ltd, a not-for-profit company that imports the abortion pill mifepristone from France. The pill was approved for use in 2001, and allowed women to have medical — rather than surgical — abortions for the first time. No other pharmaceutical company was interested in importing the drug.

== Views ==
In 2015, Sparrow stated that New Zealand's abortion law was out of date and should be reformed:

Our [abortion] law is so old, it’s creaking at the seams ... It was devised at a time when only surgical options were there, people didn’t even dream of having a medical abortion pill you could take.

She is also critical of the way the current abortion system forces women to claim they need abortions on the grounds of a danger to mental health:

You have to have grounds for an abortion, and in New Zealand 98 per cent of the grounds are mental health, which I think is an absolute farce. It’s just ticking boxes, and just putting people into categories, and just pretending that… having an abortion will be for the sake of your mental health. Well, I think that’s all just barriers that are put up.

== Honours and awards ==
In the 1987 Queen's Birthday Honours, Sparrow was appointed a Member of the Order of the British Empire, for services to medicine and the community, and in 1993 she was awarded the New Zealand Suffrage Centennial Medal. In the 2002 Queen's Birthday and Golden Jubilee Honours, she was appointed a Distinguished Companion of the New Zealand Order of Merit, for services to medicine and the community, and in 2009 she accepted redesignation as a Dame Companion of the New Zealand Order of Merit following the restoration of titular honours by the New Zealand government.

The Sexual wellbeing clinic in Wellington is named after Sparrow. Sparrow was a keen collector of contraceptive devices, which were later donated to the Museum of New Zealand Te Papa Tongarewa. In 2015–16, Te Papa used them as the core of an exhibition on contraception.

== Publications ==
- Sparrow, Abortion Then & Now: New Zealand Abortion Stories From 1940 to 1980 (Wellington: Victoria University Press, 2010); ISBN 9780864736321
- Sparrow, Rough on Women: Abortion in Nineteenth Century New Zealand (Wellington, VUP, 2014); ISBN 9780864739360
- Sparrow, "Risking their Lives: NZ Abortion Stories 1900-1939" (Wellington: Victoria University Press, 2017); ISBN 9781776561636

== See also ==
- Abortion in New Zealand
