= B.a.B.e. =

Croatian non-governmental organization

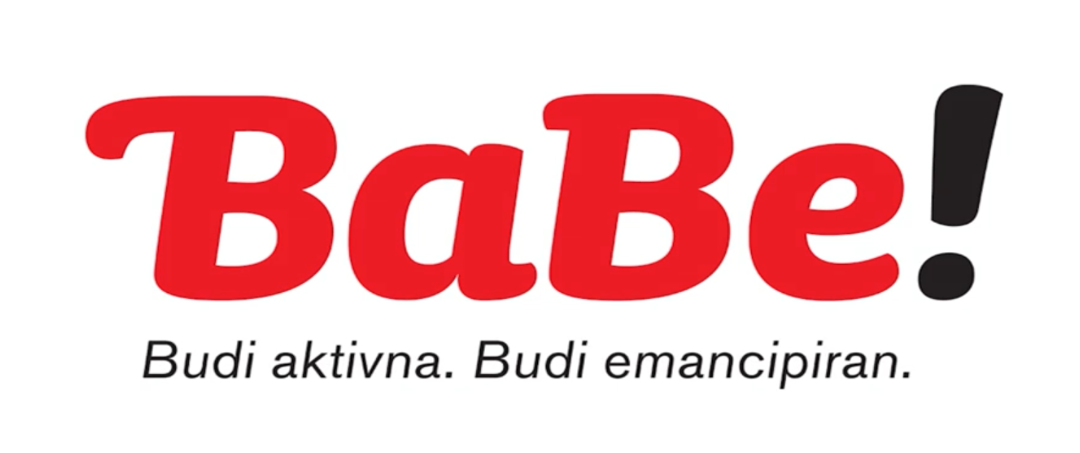
- Official logo
- Formation: 1994
- Type: Non-Profit
- Legal status: NGO
- Headquarters: Zagreb
- Region served: Croatia
- Official language: Croatian language
- Website: babe.hr

B.a.B.e. is non-governmental organization based in Zagreb, Croatia, that promotes and protects women's rights.

== Activities ==
Some of B.a.B.e. activities include demanding accountability of public officials for not punishing violence and crimes, advocating a stronger role for women in politics, researching discrimination in the employment of women who are members of the Serbian national minority, defending rights of sexual minorities, and recognition of rape as a war crime.

In 2010, a UNESCO document called B.a.b.e. perhaps the most active group in Croatia carrying out analyses of female representation in the media. It also helped create the South Eastern Europe Legal Initiative (SEELINE) which involves 10 countries from the region. The UN Fund to End Violence against Women selected B.a.B.e. project as one of 22 (out of 2573 NGO applications) accepted in 2011.
