= Contraception, Sterilisation, and Abortion Act 1977 =

Act of Parliament in New Zealand

New Zealand Parliament
- Long title: An Act to specify the circumstances in which contraceptives and information relating to contraception may be supplied and given to young persons, to define the circumstances under which sterilisations may be undertaken, and to provide for the circumstances and procedures under which abortions may be authorised after having full regard to the rights of the unborn child.
- Royal assent: 16 December 1977

Legislative history
- Passed: 1977

Amended by
- Abortion Legislation Act 2020; Contraception, Sterilisation, and Abortion (Safe Areas) Amendment Act 2022
- Status: Current legislation

Contraception, Sterilisation, and Abortion Act 1977, also known as the CS&A Act 1977, is an Act of Parliament in New Zealand. It was passed shortly following an inquiry by the Royal Commission on Contraception, Sterilisation and Abortion. The legislation established the legal framework for abortion in New Zealand; with abortions being allowed provided the procedure was approved by two certifying consultants and that the circumstances met the criteria of the Crimes Act 1961. In March 2020, several of its provisions were amended by the Abortion Legislation Act 2020, which eased access to abortion and eliminated most of the criteria established by the Crimes Act 1961.

== Legislative features ==
=== 1977 legislation ===
The Contraception, Sterilisation and Abortion Act 1977 regulated the supply of contraceptives to young people, the conditions that sterilisations could be undertaken, and the circumstances under which abortions could be authorised. The legislation decriminalised abortions for pregnancies of less than 20 weeks on the condition that it was authorised by two certifying consultants and that it met the following criteria under Sections 182–187A of the Crimes Act 1961 and two amendments passed in December 1977 and July 1978:

- to save the life of the woman (even if after 20 weeks);
- to preserve the physical health of the woman;
- to preserve the mental health of the woman;
- foetal impairment; and
- in cases of incest

Other factors which may be taken into account were:

- extremes of age; and
- sexual violation (previously rape)

After 20 weeks gestation, the grounds for abortion were:

- to save the life of the mother;
- to prevent serious permanent injury to the physical or mental health of the mother.

The CS&A Act also established an Abortion Supervisory Committee for regulating and licensing certifying consultants. It also made it illegal for health employers to deny employment to medical practitioners on the basis of their conscientious objection to abortion.

=== 2020 amendments ===
The Abortion Legislation Act 2020 replaces Sections 10 to 46 of the CS&A Act 1977 with Sections 10–14 and Sections 19–21. While Sections 15 to 17 created safe areas around abortion service providers, these clauses were eliminated from the final version of the law. The amended bill also abolishes the Abortion Supervisory Committee and delegates its former responsibilities to the Minister of Health and the Director-General of Health. The amended clauses are:

- Section 10: A health practitioner may provide abortion services to a woman who is not more than 20 weeks pregnant.
- Section 11: After 20 weeks, a health practitioner can only provide abortion services to a woman if it is deemed "clinically appropriate" and if they consult at least one other qualified practitioner.
- Section 13: A health practitioner must advise a woman of the availability of counselling services if the woman seeks advice on whether to continue or terminate a pregnancy; advises the health practitioner of her intention to terminate the pregnancy; or has terminated pregnancy.
- Section 14: A health practitioner cannot force a woman to seek counselling as a condition for procuring an abortion.
- Section 19: A health practitioner with a conscientious objection to abortion must inform the patient and provide them with information on accessing alternative abortion providers.
- Section 20: Employer providing certain services must accommodate conscientious objection of applicant or employee unless it would cause unreasonable disruption. Abortion is regulated by the Ministry of Health and the Director-General of Health, which oversee the collection and publication of information relating to abortion services and providers. Section 20F prohibits abortion for the sole purpose of sex selection.
- Section 21: The Governor-General has the authority to direct the Director-General of Health to collection.

=== 2022 amendments ===
The Contraception, Sterilisation, and Abortion (Safe Areas) Amendment Act 2022 inserts Sections 13A to 13C which:

- Section 13A: Prohibits obstructing, filming in an intimidating manner, dissuading or protesting against those trying to access abortion services in designated "safe areas."
- Section 13B: Empowers Police to arrest those engaging in the above prohibited activities.
- Section 13C: Creates safe spaces of no more than 150 metres around abortion providers.

== History ==
In response to growing calls for the decriminalisation of abortion in New Zealand during the 1960s and 1970s, the New Zealand Parliament established a Royal Commission on Contraception, Sterilisation and Abortion in 1975 to consider abortion and these other issues. Based on the Royal Commission's recommendations, Parliament passed the Contraception, Sterilisation, and Abortion Act 1977, on a 40–26 vote.

Voting at third reading (15 December 1977)
Party	Voted for	Voted against	Absent
National (55)	28: Keith Allen; Neill Austin; Bill Birch; Jim Bolger; Barry Brill; Ken Comber; Warren Cooper; Ben Couch; Gavin Downie; John Falloon; Matt Doocey; Bob Fenton; Frank Gill; Dail Jones; Bill Lambert; Ed Latter; Jack Luxton; Aussie Malcolm; Allan McCready; Colin McLachlan; Robert Muldoon; Rob Talbot; David Thomson; Bert Walker; Merv Wellington; Peter Wilkinson; Bill Young; Venn Young	17: Colleen Dewe; Tony Friedlander; George Gair; Les Gandar; Allan Highet; Eric Holland; Norman Jones; John Lithgow; Duncan MacIntyre; Jim McLay; Mike Minogue; Derek Quigley; Ian Shearer; Brian Talboys; Hugh Templeton; Richard Walls; Marilyn Waring	10: Lance Adams-Schneider; Rex Austin; Bob Bell; John Elliott; Jonathan Elworthy; Richard Harrison (Acting Speaker); Roy Jack; Ray La Varis; Harry Lapwood; Leo Schultz
Labour (32)	13: Basil Arthur; Ron Bailey; Fraser Colman; Mick Connelly; Mel Courtney; Roger Drayton; Arthur Faulkner; Bill Fraser; Gerald O'Brien; Matiu Rata; Gerry Wall; Koro Wētere; Trevor Young	9: Gordon Christie; Martyn Finlay; John Kirk; Whetu Tirikatene-Sullivan; Russell Marshall; Richard Prebble; Frank Rogers; Whetu Tirikatene-Sullivan; Bob Tizard	10: Bruce Barclay; Mary Batchelor; Paddy Blanchfield; Roger Douglas; Jonathan Hunt; Eddie Isbey; David Lange; Brian MacDonell; Paraone Reweti; Bill Rowling
Totals	40	26	20

The Act established the regulatory framework for abortion. Women seeking abortion had to see their doctor and two medical consultants, who would assess the mental and physical grounds for carrying out an abortion under the criteria of the Crimes Act 1961. A surgeon would be needed to perform an abortion and counselling was also made available to women seeking an abortion. The CS&A Act also established an Abortion Supervisory Committee to regulate the consultation process and required district health boards to fund abortion services.

Feminists and abortion-rights groups considered the CS&A Act's legal framework too strict, leading the Third National Government to amend the Crime Act. Subsequent amendments to the Crimes Act 1961 in 1977 and 1978 permitted abortion within 20 weeks on mental and physical health grounds; abortion after 20 weeks for the purpose of saving the mother's life, physical, and mental health; foetal abnormality within the first 20 weeks; and incest. In 1986, the Fourth Labour Government amended the Crimes Act to account for the extremes of age and sexual violation as mitigating grounds for abortion.

Over the next three decades, politicians and abortion-rights groups lobbied for amending the CS&A Act to ease the criteria for abortions. In late March 2020, the Sixth Labour Government passed the Abortion Legislation Act 2020, which replaced Sections 10 to 46 of the CS&A Act with new clauses allowing women to seek abortion in the first 20 weeks of pregnancy; and only requiring consultations with two health practitioners after 20 weeks.

In March 2021, the Contraception, Sterilisation, and Abortion (Safe Areas) Amendment Act 2022 was introduced into Parliament. It proposed the creation of safe areas around abortion providers where certain "prohibited behaviour" would be banned. The Bill passed its first reading on 10 March (by a margin of 100 to 15) and proceeded to select committee stage. The Bill passed its third reading on 16 March 2022, becoming law on 18 March 2022.

== See also ==
- Abortion in New Zealand
- Abortion Legislation Act 2020
