= Death of Norman Kirk =

1974 death of New Zealand's prine minister

Death and state funeral of Norman Kirk
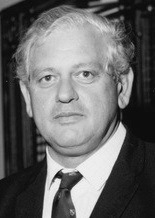
- Kirk in 1973
- Date: 31 August 1974 (Date of death); 4 September 1974 (Date of state funeral)
- Location: St Paul's Cathedral, Wellington (first official funeral ceremony) Christchurch Town Hall (second service)
- Cause: Pulmonary embolism
- Burial: Waimate Lawn Cemetery, Waimate, Canterbury

On 31 August 1974, Norman Kirk, the 29th prime minister of New Zealand, died unexpectedly aged 51 after a period of poor health. The death led to an outpouring of grief, and weakened the Labour Party, contributing to their loss of the 1975 election. His state funeral was held on 4 September 1974.

Having struggled sporadically with obesity and occupational burnout throughout his life, from 1974 Kirk suddenly developed difficulty in breathing, eating and sleeping, which rapidly got worse. His intense workload meant he rarely took time off, but had finally given in to pressure from his colleagues and begun a six-week holiday by August 1974. His health rapidly deteriorated thereafter, and he died in hospital in Island Bay by the end of the month. Kirk's physician Tom O'Donnell determined that the prime minister had died of a pulmonary embolism. His death was announced the following day, and deeply shocked the nation.

Kirk's state funeral was held in Wellington on 4 September 1974, and combined of Māori cultural rites with Pākehā ones. Traditional Māori aspects of the funeral included kaikaranga, waiata and whaikōrero, and were accordant to the practices of the mana whenua of each funeral location (In Central Wellington, Te Āti Awa, and in Christchurch, Kāi Tahu).

== Illness ==
During his time as prime minister, Kirk kept up an intense schedule, refusing to reduce his workload by any significant degree and rarely taking time off (the Chatham Islands was his favourite retreat). Kirk ignored advice from several doctors and from Bob Tizard and Warren Freer to "take care of himself" and to reduce his heavy consumption of Coca-Cola and alcohol (beer, plus later whisky or gin), saying he would have a "short but happy life". Though a non-smoker, he had dysentery and exhibited symptoms of undiagnosed diabetes.

By 1974 he had difficulty in breathing, eating and sleeping. In April Kirk had an operation to remove varicose veins from both legs at once despite advice to have two operations. Doctors and colleagues were urging him to take time off; on 26 August Social Credit Party leader Bruce Beetham advised him to take a couple of months off to recover. His final public appearance was on 18 August to open St Peter's Catholic College in Palmerston North, when he stood in the rain for the whole ceremony, and he missed a proposed debate with Robert Muldoon before interviewer David Frost.

== Death ==
On 15 August 1974 Kirk decided to take two days off, and on 26 August he decided to have six weeks of complete rest. He had been checked over by many doctors, and an examination by Professor Tom O’Donnell on 27 August confirmed that he had an enlarged heart gravely weakened by embolisms, and which was not pumping regularly enough to get sufficient oxygen into his bloodstream; one lung was two-thirds incapacitated by the clot; and his stomach was very sore as his liver was swollen with retained fluid. He went into the Home of Compassion Hospital, Island Bay, Wellington on 28 August. He was photographed going in the boilerhouse door to avoid the media at the front. He rang and reminisced with close colleagues, and his bed was covered with official papers. On Saturday 31 August he told his wife Ruth, who had been told of his serious situation and came to Wellington, "I am dying .. please don't tell anyone". Soon after 9 pm, while watching a police drama on television (Softly, Softly: Taskforce with Stratford Johns on NZBC TV), he slowly slid from a sitting position. He died of a pulmonary embolism when a blood clot released from a vein into his heart cut off the blood flow and stopped the heart. O'Donnell signed his death certificate.

Kirk's death shocked the nation. Biographer Michael Bassett states, "There followed an outpouring of grief paralleled only by that which had followed [Prime Minister] M. J. Savage's death in 1940".

While colleagues had been urging him to take some time off, none were aware of the seriousness of his last illness. Bob Harvey, the Labour Party president, said that Kirk was "a robust man" with the "constitution of a horse". He proposed a Royal Commission to investigate rumours that he had been killed, perhaps with contact poison, by the CIA. This story returned during the 1999 visit of American president Bill Clinton to New Zealand.

== International responses ==
Many international politicians reacted to Kirk's death. Harold Wilson, Gough Whitlam, Gerald Ford, Henry Kissinger and Pierre Trudeau all paid tribute to the loss of Kirk. Queen Elizabeth II sent a letter of condolence to his widow.

World leaders

- Australia: Despite him and Kirk infamously disliking one another, Gough Whitlam said in a heartfelt address that Kirk's death was "a tragic loss for Australia, the Pacific and Southeast Asia" and that "the cause of democratic socialism throughout the world has lost a source of inspiration".
- Canada: A spokesman for Prime Minister Pierre Trudeau said Trudeau "felt a deep sense of loss" and that Kirk was a "refreshing personality."
- Japan: Prime Minister Kakuei Tanaka sent a telegram of condolence.
- Singapore: Prime Minister Lee Kuan Yew sent a message which said: "I was grieved to hear of the sudden death of Norman Kirk. He was a man of principle. What he said he followed up by what he did. At the Commonwealth conference in Ottawa last August he impressed all who met him for the first time by his sincerity and his convictions. His death is a loss to New Zealand and to all those in the Commonwealth who knew and respected him. The countries of Southeast Asia, which he visited so often whilst in Opposition, have lost a good and dependable friend."
- Western Samoa: Prime Minister Fiamē Mataʻafa Faumuina Mulinuʻu II sent his sympathies and said he would come to New Zealand for Kirk's funeral.
- United Kingdom: Prime Minister Harold Wilson, a close friend of Kirk's in private life as well as diplomatically, was known to be deeply shocked and saddened by the death. He paid tribute to Kirk as a "friend and colleague".
- United States: President Gerald Ford referred to Kirk as an "eminent leader" who would be remembered for his "...humanity, sense of justice, and zeal in the pursuit of peace will inspire people everywhere long after his passing."

Other international figures

United States Secretary of State Henry Kissinger wrote "All of us shall greatly miss the energy and vision of a leader whom we much admired. He was one of America's most valued and respected friends. I am certain, however, that the spirit and substance of his work shall endure." British Foreign Secretary James Callaghan said Kirk was a "loyal friend of this country, an outstanding leader of the New Zealand Labour Party, and a strong believer in Commonwealth ties. His many friends in the Labour movement in this country will deeply mourn his passing. He had great things ahead of him, had he lived." Former UK prime minister Edward Heath described Kirk as a good friend of Britain and a strong supporter of the Commonwealth. He stated "Although we differed in our political views I admired his common-sense approach to world problems as well as his single-mindedness of purpose in looking after the interests of his own country. His death at such an early age and after so short a period as Prime Minister is a great loss to the Commonwealth." French Minister of Foreign Affairs, Jean Sauvagnargues, wrote "I have learned with great sadness the news of the death of Mr Kirk. In these tragic circumstances I beg you to accept my heartfelt and sincere condolences."

== Domestic responses ==
Politician and historian Michael Bassett has described Kirk as 'Labour's last passionate believer in big government, someone whose commanding presence and extravagant rhetoric introduced a new idealism to political debate in New Zealand'.

The parliamentary opposition stated they would refrain from all political activity until after the Labour Party caucus met to select a new prime minister. The Leader of the Opposition, Robert Muldoon, said that the National Party would "not raise issues or pursue arguments that might in any way be divisive within the Government caucus, which might cloud the judgment of its members. It is after all in the best interests of New Zealand and ourselves as New Zealanders if the electoral body concerned makes the best choice of Prime Minister that it can make on our behalf."

== Funeral ==
After a lying-in-state in Parliament House from 2 to 4 September, there was a large official funeral (or tangi) in Wellington Cathedral of St Paul, on Wednesday 4 September attended by Prince Charles, Cook Islands premier Albert Henry, and Australian prime minister Gough Whitlam; then on 5 September another service, also inter-denominational, in the Christchurch Town Hall followed by a simple burial service in his hometown Waimate. He was buried near his mother's grave; the burial service was delayed as the RNZAF Hercules could not land at Waimate and the procession hurried by road to meet the daylight requirement for burials. Memorial services were held around New Zealand, and on 26 September in Westminster Abbey, London.

== Aftermath ==
Finance minister Bill Rowling succeeded Kirk as prime minister. Kirk's son, John, won the resulting Sydenham by-election in November 1974 to replace him in parliament.
