= Samuel Paull Andrews =

New Zealand politician

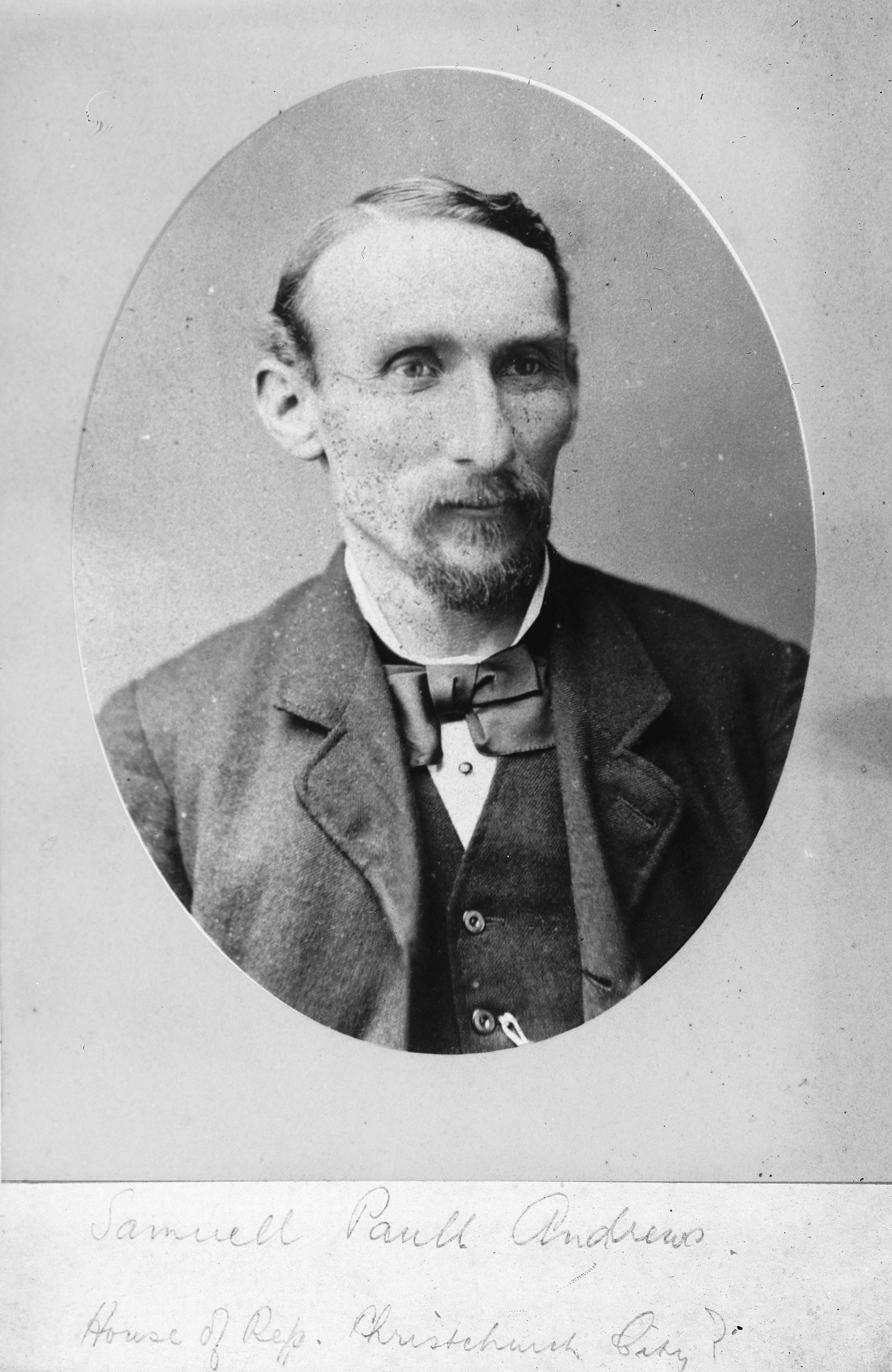
Samuel Paull Andrews, circa 1875

Samuel Paull Andrews (1836 – 18 October 1916) was a 19th-century politician in Christchurch, New Zealand. Originally from the Isle of Wight, he was the first working class man to become a Member of Parliament in his chosen country.

== Early life ==
Andrews was born at Wootton Bridge on the Isle of Wight. He learned the trade of a plasterer. He emigrated to Victoria in Australia in 1854 and spent ten years there, initially gold mining.

He came to Auckland in 1864 on a plastering contract for the Union Bank of Australia. He then worked on other plastering contracts in Nelson and Dunedin before settling in Christchurch.

== Political career ==
Andrews first tried to get elected to the Canterbury Provincial Council in 1867, but he narrowly missed out. He was the first working class candidate. He was elected to the 6th provincial council on 29 July 1872, narrowly defeating John Cracroft Wilson and his victory was celebrated by carrying him through the streets. He was the first working-class man to be elected onto the Canterbury Provincial Council. He was re-elected in 1874, gaining two more votes than Henry Tancred, who was also elected. Andrews served until the abolition of provincial government in 1876.

New Zealand Parliament
Years	Term	Electorate	Party
1879–1881	7th	City of Christchurch	Independent

Andrews first stood for Parliament in the 1875 general election in the three member City of Christchurch electorate. The working men's vote was split by Jerningham Wakefield, and Andrews came fourth, trailing Edward Stevens, Edward Richardson and William Sefton Moorhouse.

Andrews contested the next 1879 general election. This time, he proved successful, coming second equal with Edward Stevens, just behind George Grey and only 23 votes ahead of Edward Richardson. He was the first working class person to be elected to Parliament in New Zealand. He represented Christchurch until the end of the term in 1881.

The City of Christchurch electorate was abolished in 1881, and Andrews stood in the Christchurch North electorate against Henry Thomson, who gained 577 votes against 466 votes for Andrews; Thomson was thus returned.

When William White resigned from the Sydenham electorate in March 1886 on medical advice, Andrews had one last attempt of regaining entry to Parliament. Richard Molesworth Taylor successfully contested the subsequent by-election on 12 May, gaining 438 votes against John Lee Scott (418), Andrews (230) and S. G. Jolly (2).

Andrews was elected onto Christchurch City Council in 1884 and was a councillor until 1887. During his time on the council, the new civic office (these days known as Our City was constructed. Andrews caused controversy by claiming the building was structurally unsound. The design competition for the building had been won by Samuel Hurst Seager, who was young and relatively inexperienced, and his design in Queen Anne style was an architectural type unfamiliar to New Zealand. Benjamin Mountfort and John Whitelaw, both architects, and Edward Dobson, an engineer, reviewed the design and the building and found everything to be safe.

== Private life ==
Andrews married Elizabeth Ann Gahagan on 9 August 1874 at Christchurch; they had three sons and four daughters.

He was ambitious, energetic and athletic. He pursued different business opportunities and was involved in many organisations. He was a champion rower for several years and also distinguished himself as an administrator for the sport. He had little tolerance for laziness.

Andrews died on 18 October 1916 at Heathcote Valley, and was buried at Linwood Cemetery. His wife died three years later on 24 September 1919 at Sumner.

== Notes ==
New Zealand Parliament
Preceded by William Sefton Moorhouse	Member of Parliament for Christchurch; 1879–1881; Served alongside: Edward Stevens, Edward Richardson	In abeyance Title next held by Westby Perceval; William Pember Reeves; Richard Molesworth Taylor
