= Electoral history of Norman Kirk =

List of elections featuring Norman Kirk as a candidate

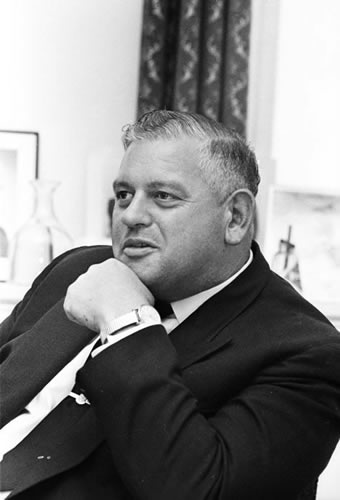
Norman Kirk in 1974

This is a summary of the electoral history of Norman Kirk, Prime Minister of New Zealand (1972–74), Leader of the Labour Party (1965–74), Member of Parliament (1957–74; Lyttelton to 1969, and later Sydenham until 1974).

== Parliamentary elections ==
=== 1954 election ===
General election, 1954: Hurunui
Party	Candidate	Votes	%	±%
National	William Gillespie	6,454	52.3	−8.7
Labour	Norman Kirk	4,059	32.9	
Social Credit	Laurie Cate	1,829	14.8	
Majority		2,395	19.4	−2.6
Turnout		13,524	91.8	+3.9

=== 1957 election ===
General election, 1957: Lyttelton
Party	Candidate	Votes	%	±%
Labour	Norman Kirk	8,064	48.65	
National	Harry Lake	7,497	45.23	+2.94
Social Credit	Wilfrid Owen	1,014	6.11	−12.21
Majority		567	3.42	
Turnout		16,575	94.61	−3.01
Registered electors		17,519		

=== 1960 election ===
General election, 1960: Lyttelton
Party	Candidate	Votes	%	±%
Labour	Norman Kirk	7,910	47.65	−1.00
National	Jim Hay	7,650	46.08	
Social Credit	Cliff Munnings	1,040	6.26	
Majority		260	1.56	−1.86
Turnout		16,600	92.68	−1.93
Registered electors		17,911		

=== 1963 election ===
General election, 1963: Lyttelton
Party	Candidate	Votes	%	±%
Labour	Norman Kirk	9,539	54.04	+6.35
National	Tom Flint	6,862	38.87	
Social Credit	Cliff Munnings	1,249	7.07	+0.81
Majority		2,677	15.16	+13.60
Turnout		17,650	92.15	−0.53
Registered electors		19,153		

=== 1966 election ===
General election, 1966: Lyttelton
Party	Candidate	Votes	%	±%
Labour	Norman Kirk	9,045	52.00	−2.04
National	Peter de Latour	6,924	39.80	
Social Credit	Cliff Munnings	1,424	8.18	+1.11
Majority		2,121	12.19	−2.97
Turnout		17,393	87.64	−4.51
Registered electors		19,844		

=== 1969 election ===
General election, 1969: Sydenham
Party	Candidate	Votes	%	±%
Labour	Norman Kirk	10,575	63.55	
National	Peter Morrisey	4,549	27.33	
Social Credit	Joe Pounsford	1,285	7.72	−9.67
Independent	Ian Andrew More	121	0.72	
Independent	Michael "Tubby" Hansen	110	0.66	
Majority		6,026	36.21	
Turnout		16,640	86.65	+3.95
Registered electors		19,203		

=== 1972 election ===
General election, 1972: Sydenham
Party	Candidate	Votes	%	±%
Labour	Norman Kirk	11,711	67.45	+3.90
National	John Burn	4,722	27.19	
Social Credit	Alan Easterbrook	758	4.36	
Independent	Michael "Tubby" Hansen	67	0.38	−0.28
New Democratic	John Bernard Elliot	62	0.35	
Independent	Michael Leeman-Smith	42	0.24	
Majority		6,989	40.25	+4.04
Turnout		17,362	89.57	+2.92
Registered electors		19,382		

== Local elections ==
=== 1953 Kaiapoi mayoral election ===
Kaiapoi mayoral election, 1953
Party	Candidate	Votes	%	±%
Labour	Norman Kirk	621	54.86	
Independent	Owen Hills	511	45.14	
Majority		110	9.71	
Turnout		1,132		
Registered electors				

=== 1956 Kaiapoi mayoral election ===
Kaiapoi mayoral election, 1956
Party	Candidate	Votes	%	±%
Labour	Norman Kirk	Unopposed		
Registered electors				

== Leadership elections ==
=== 1963 Deputy-leadership election ===
Candidate	Votes	%
Hugh Watt	17	51.5
Norman Kirk	16	48.5
Majority	1	3.0
Turnout	33	—N/a

=== 1965 Leadership election ===
Candidate	Votes	%
Norman Kirk	25	71.4
Arnold Nordmeyer	10	28.6
Majority	15	42.8
Turnout	35	—N/a

== Party elections ==
=== 1964 Party Conference ===
1964 Presidential election
Candidate	Votes	%
Norman Kirk	401	70.10
Arnold Nordmeyer	166	29.02
Informal	5	0.87
Majority	235	41.08
Turnout	572	—N/a

=== 1965 Party Conference ===
Kirk was re-elected president unopposed.
