= 1886 Sydenham by-election =

New Zealand by-election

The by-election for Sydenham in 1886 was a by-election held during the 9th Parliament of New Zealand on 12 May 1886 in the Sydenham electorate. It was held because William White resigned his seat in March 1886 on medical advice. Richard Molesworth Taylor won the by-election against John Lee Scott, Samuel Paull Andrews and S. G. Jolly.

== Results ==
1886 Sydenham by-election
Party	Candidate	Votes	%	±%
Independent	Richard Molesworth Taylor	438	39.35	
Independent	John Lee Scott	418	37.56	+1.10
Independent	Samuel Paull Andrews	230	20.66	
Independent	S. G. Jolly	2	0.18	
Rejected ballots		25	2.25	
Turnout		1,113		
Majority		20	1.80	−23.53
