= Edward Cephas John Stevens =

New Zealand politician

The Honourable Edward Stevens
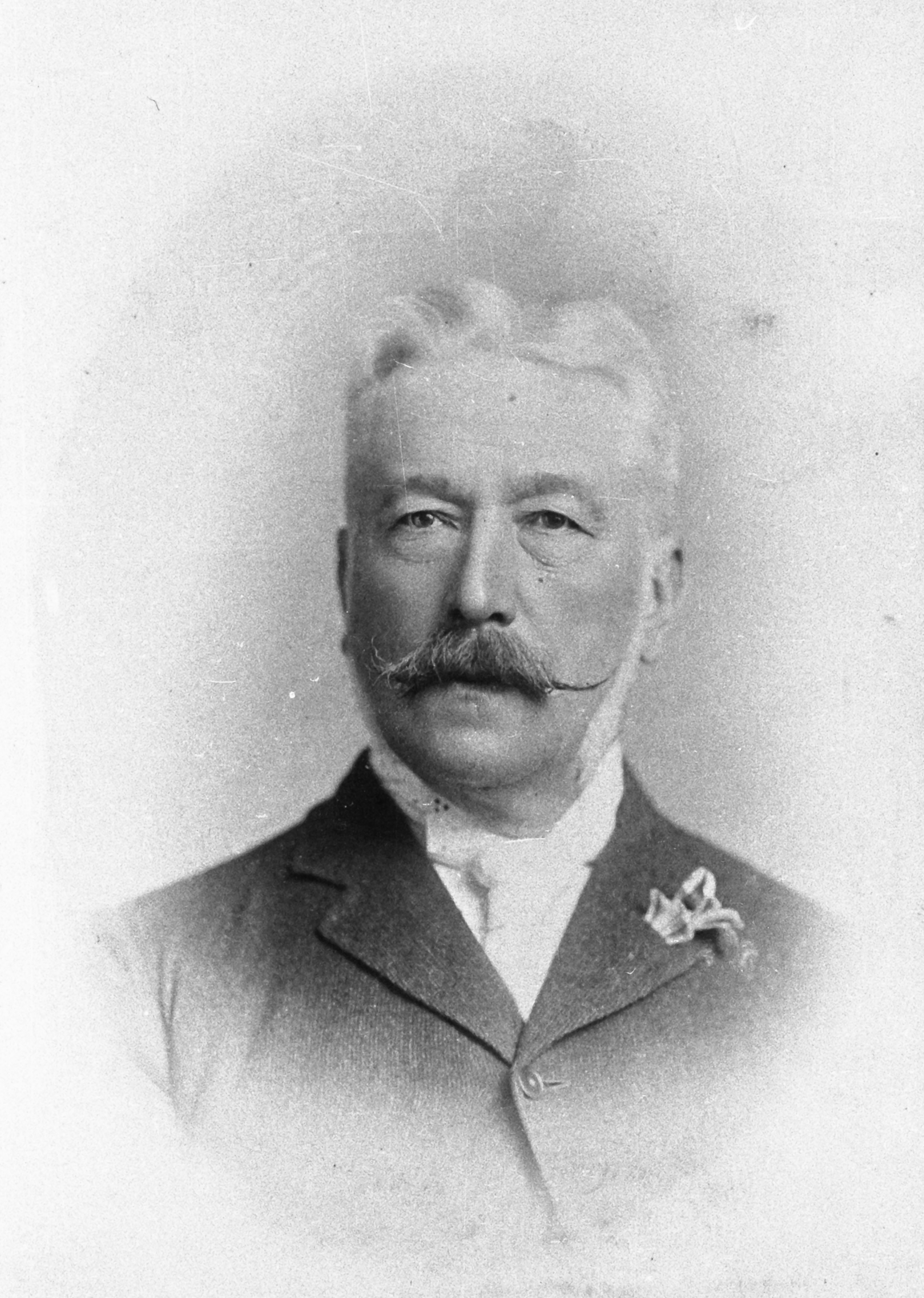
- Stevens, c. 1907

New Zealand Legislative Councillor
- In office 1882–1915
- Succeeded by: John Andrew Millar

Member of the New Zealand Parliament for Selwyn
- In office 1866–1870
- Preceded by: new constituency
- Succeeded by: William Reeves
- Majority: unopposed

Member of the New Zealand Parliament for City of Christchurch
- In office 1876–1881
- Preceded by: new constituency
- Succeeded by: constituency abolished

Canterbury Provincial Councillor
- In office 1863–1866

Personal details
- Born: 18 October 1837 London
- Died: 6 June 1915 (aged 77) Englefield (his residence)
- Resting place: St. Peter’s Anglican Church cemetery, Upper Riccarton (43.53170°S 172.56990°E)
- Spouse: Maria
- Children: Frederic Whitcombe (son of his wife); George, second son died in infancy
- Profession: politician, land and estate agent

Edward Cephas John Stevens (18 October 1837 – 6 June 1915) was a New Zealand politician in provincial government in Canterbury, and a member of both the lower and upper houses of parliament. A businessman, he controlled the Christchurch Press for many decades. He was instrumental in introducing cricket to Canterbury and one of his dealings as a land and estate agent resulted in the creation of Lancaster Park.

== Early life ==
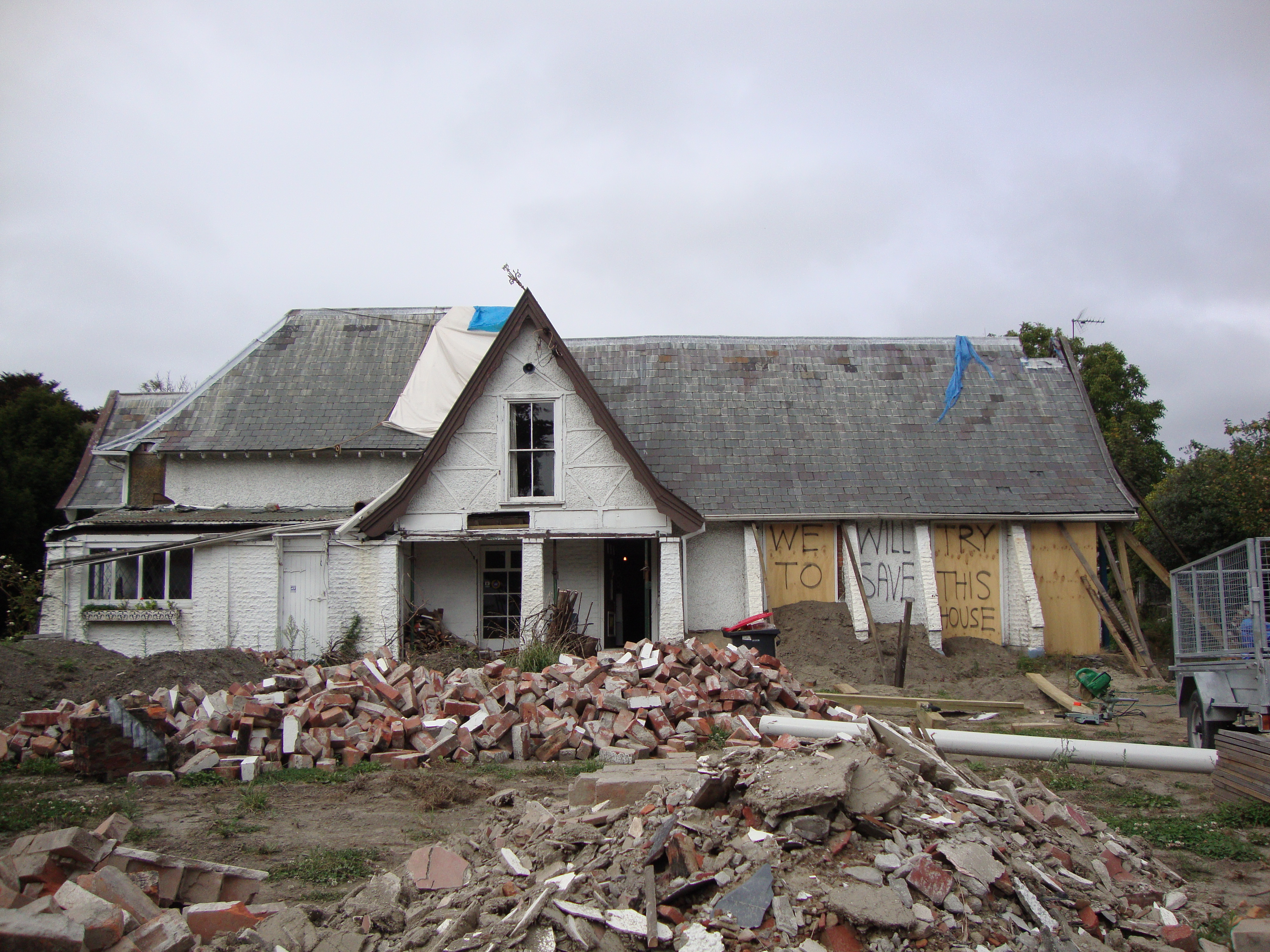
Englefield Lodge was significantly damaged in the February 2011 Christchurch earthquake

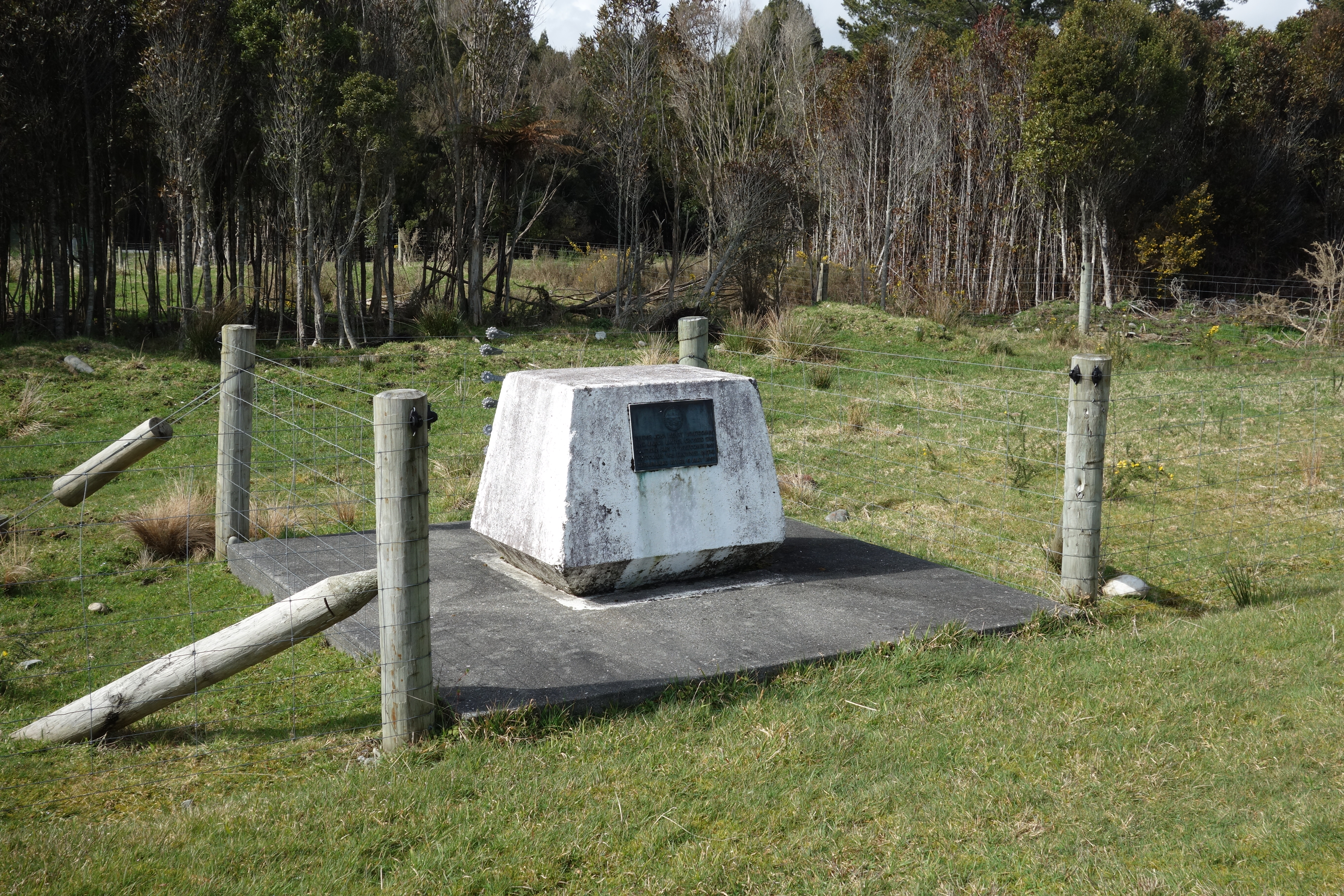
The Whitcombe memorial near the Taramakau River

Stevens was born at Salford in the county of Oxfordshire, England. He was the youngest son of Reverend William Everest Stevens (the local rector), and his wife, Mary James. He was educated at Marlborough College and at the Royal Agricultural College in Cirencester.

At age 21, Stevens emigrated to New Zealand. Among the passengers were the surveyor John Henry Whitcombe (known by his middle name Henry) with his wife, Maria Whitcombe (née North), and their family. Several sources say that they arrived in Lyttelton on 20 September 1858 on the Zealandia. However, the Whitcombes and Stevens are not included in the passenger list of the September 1858 arrival.

Guise Brittan established notable properties. In 1862, Stevens bought Brittan's second home 'Englefield', a 50-acre (200,000 m^{2}) tract on Rural Section 26 situated where FitzGerald Avenue meets the Avon River. The house, which still stands, had a commanding view of the annual opening of the boating regattas.

Henry Whitcombe, after whom Whitcombe Pass is named, drowned in 1863 in the Taramakau River on one of his many West Coast exploration trips. Stevens was put in charge of the fund which allowed the Whitcombe boys to attend Christ's College. On 20 May 1869, at St. Peter's Anglican Church in Upper Riccarton, Stevens married Maria Whitcombe. They had two sons, one of whom died in infancy. One of Maria's sons was Frederic Whitcombe.

== Professional life ==
After having lived on Banks Peninsula for some two years, Stevens returned to Christchurch. In 1861, he set himself up as a land agent, and represented absentee landholders. In April 1862, he joined forces with Richard J. S. Harman to set up Harman and Stevens, acting as land agents and financiers. Harman put Stevens in contact with James FitzGerald, the editor of The Press. FitzGerald was gifted as an editor, but lacked financial skills. Stevens financed FitzGerald beginning in 1863, and took control from 1868 for the rest of his life. FitzGerald once described Stevens as a "thorough Jew".

== Cricket ==
After Brittan, Stevens is considered the second-ranked father of cricket in Canterbury. Together with J. A. Bennett, Stevens arranged and financed the All England Eleven visits in 1864 and 1877. He played in all of Canterbury's representative games until 1883. Stevens was a member of the New Zealand Cricket Council from its inception, and was a president of the Canterbury Cricket Association.

In 1882, Stevens and Arthur Ollivier initiated the purchase of a parcel of land which became Lancaster Park. For Stevens, this was a transaction through his company on behalf of an absentee owner, Benjamin Lancaster.

== Political career ==
New Zealand Parliament
Years	Term	Electorate	Party
1866–1870	4th	Selwyn	Independent
1875–1879	6th	Christchurch	Independent
1879–1881	7th	Christchurch	Independent

Stevens stood for and was elected to the Canterbury Provincial Council in 1863. He served in Tancred's provincial executive until 1866 during Samuel Bealey's superintendency. He left provincial politics on the election of William Sefton Moorhouse as superintendent in that year.

Instead, he stood in the newly created Selwyn electorate for a seat in the House of Representatives in early 1866. As there were no other candidates, he was returned uncontested to the 4th New Zealand Parliament. His ability, especially in financial matters, was soon recognised.

Stevens contested Selwyn at the following 1871 general election, advocating free trade and opposing a grain duty. He lost by one vote to William Reeves who took the seat 102 votes to 101.

At the 21 December 1875 election, he stood in the City of Christchurch electorate for the 6th New Zealand Parliament. He was returned at the head of the poll in this three-member electorate; the other members returned for this seat were Edward Richardson and Moorhouse.

Stevens again stood for the City of Christchurch seat in the 10 September 1879 election. He came second-equal and was thus returned, together with George Grey and Samuel Paull Andrews, to the 7th New Zealand Parliament.

At the end of the 7th session of the House of Representatives, he was offered a seat in the Legislative Council, being appointed on 7 March 1882, and remained on it until he died. He served in the upper house until his death. Stevens was a minister without portfolio in Harry Atkinson's fourth term as premier, called the Scarecrow Ministry. The ministers were sworn in on 11 October 1887 and Stevens remained a minister until the end of Atkinson's term on 24 January 1891.

In the 4th Parliament, Stevens campaigned for the abolition of provincial governments, and for provincial loans to be consolidated with those of the colony. He also argued for revived colonisation. The decisions were deferred to the 5th Parliament, and while Stevens was not a member during that term, William Fox and Julius Vogel advanced many of his causes. In 1870, Vogel put forward the Public Trust Bill and acknowledged Stevens as the author of this initiative. Under this bill, the state becomes responsible for the distribution of estates and properties under will. A plaque acknowledging his work is on display in the Public Trust head office. Throughout his parliamentary membership, Stevens advocated for free trade.

In 1893 Stevens was at the centre of a drama that led to the passing of the Women's suffrage bill into law. Premier Seddon had expected to stop the bill in the upper house, but found that one more vote was needed. Thomas Kelly, a new Liberal Party councillor had left himself paired in favour of the measure, but Seddon obtained his consent by wire to change his vote. Seddon's manipulation so incensed two opposition councillors, Stevens and William Reynolds that they changed sides and voted for the bill, allowing it to pass by 20 votes to 18 and so gave the vote to women.

Upon Stevens' death, he was succeeded in the Legislative Council by John Andrew Millar.

== Death and commemoration ==
Stevens died in his sleep on 6 June 1915 at his home Englefield from heart failure. He is buried at the St. Peter's Anglican Church cemetery. His business acumen may be gauged by the £280,000 that he left, which was distributed to his wife, his son Charles, and members of the Whitcombe family.

Sir Charles Bowen, Speaker of the Legislative Council, said about Stevens:

Although he never took the prominent part in the politics of the country that his undoubted talents warranted, he was a man whose opinion was always valued, and to whose statements the House always listened with attention. Mr. Stevens was too busy to give his whole time to politics, but his carefully considered opinion was sought very frequently.

George Whitcombe, Maria's son from her first marriage, died in 1919. Maria Stevens died on 25 October 1921 aged 89. Both are buried at the Avonside Cemetery.

Stevens Street, running alongside Lancaster Park, is named for Edward Stevens in recognition of his contributions to cricket. Cephas Close in Sockburn was glebe land belonging to St. Peter's Anglican Church, which was developed in 1985.

New Zealand Parliament
New constituency	Member of Parliament for Selwyn; 1866–1870	Succeeded by William Reeves
In abeyance Title last held by William Sefton Moorhouse	Member of Parliament for Christchurch; 1875–1881; Served alongside: Edward Richardson, Samuel Paull Andrews, William Sefton Moorhouse	In abeyance Title next held by Westby Perceval; William Pember Reeves; Richard Molesworth Taylor
