= Richard Molesworth Taylor =

New Zealand politician (1835–1919)

Member of the New Zealand Parliament for Sydenham
- In office 1886–1890
- Preceded by: William White

Member of the New Zealand Parliament for City of Christchurch
- In office 1890–1893 Serving with William Pember Reeves, Westby Perceval (1890 – 91) and Ebenezer Sandford (1891 – 1893)
- Succeeded by: William Whitehouse Collins

Personal details
- Born: 1835 London, England
- Died: 26 August 1919 (aged 85) Wellington, New Zealand
- Spouse: Laura Augusta Gray (m. 1887; died 1903)

Richard Molesworth Taylor (1835 – 26 August 1919), also known as Sydenham Taylor, was a three-term New Zealand Member of Parliament. Born in London in 1835, he moved to Auckland on the Heather Bell in 1846. He travelled to Victoria in 1851, and later to New South Wales and participated in the gold rush before returning to Auckland in 1857. There he briefly joined the militia, serving in the New Zealand Wars, before becoming a government contractor. In 1869 he moved to Canterbury, working as a general contractor until becoming a Member of Parliament in 1886.

== Member of Parliament ==
New Zealand Parliament
Years	Term	Electorate	Party
1886–1887	9th	Sydenham	Independent
1887–1890	10th	Sydenham	Independent
1890–1893	11th	Christchurch	Independent

William White resigned his Sydenham seat in Parliament in March 1886 on medical advice. Taylor successfully contested the subsequent by-election on 12 May, gaining 438 votes against John Lee Scott (418), Samuel Paull Andrews (230) and S. G. Jolly (2).

At the 1887 general election, Taylor contested the electorate against John Crewes. They received 766 and 392 votes respectively, so Taylor entered the 10th New Zealand Parliament.

The Sydenham electorate was abolished in 1890 so Taylor contested the City of Christchurch electorate instead, winning the third highest number of votes in the three-member electorate. He unsuccessfully contested the 1893 and 1896 general elections, and the 1896 by-election.

== Private life ==
Taylor was married in 1887 to Laura Augusta Gray (born ca. 1832), a daughter of S. F. Gray of London. She died on 21 December 1903 at their home in Waltham Road, Sydenham, aged 69.

Taylor died in Wellington on 26 August 1919, and was buried at Karori Cemetery.

New Zealand Parliament
Preceded by William White	Member of Parliament for Sydenham; 1886–1890	Vacant Constituency abolished; recreated in 1946 Title next held by Mabel Howard
Vacant Constituency recreated after abolition in 1881 Title last held by Samuel Paull Andrews, Edward Richardson, Edward Cephas John Stevens	Member of Parliament for Christchurch; 1890–1893; Served alongside: William Pember Reeves, Westby Perceval (1890–1891) and Ebenezer Sandford (1891–1893)	Succeeded by William Pember Reeves, William Whitehouse Collins, George John Smith
