= Westby Perceval =

New Zealand politician (1854–1928)

Sir Westby Perceval KCMG
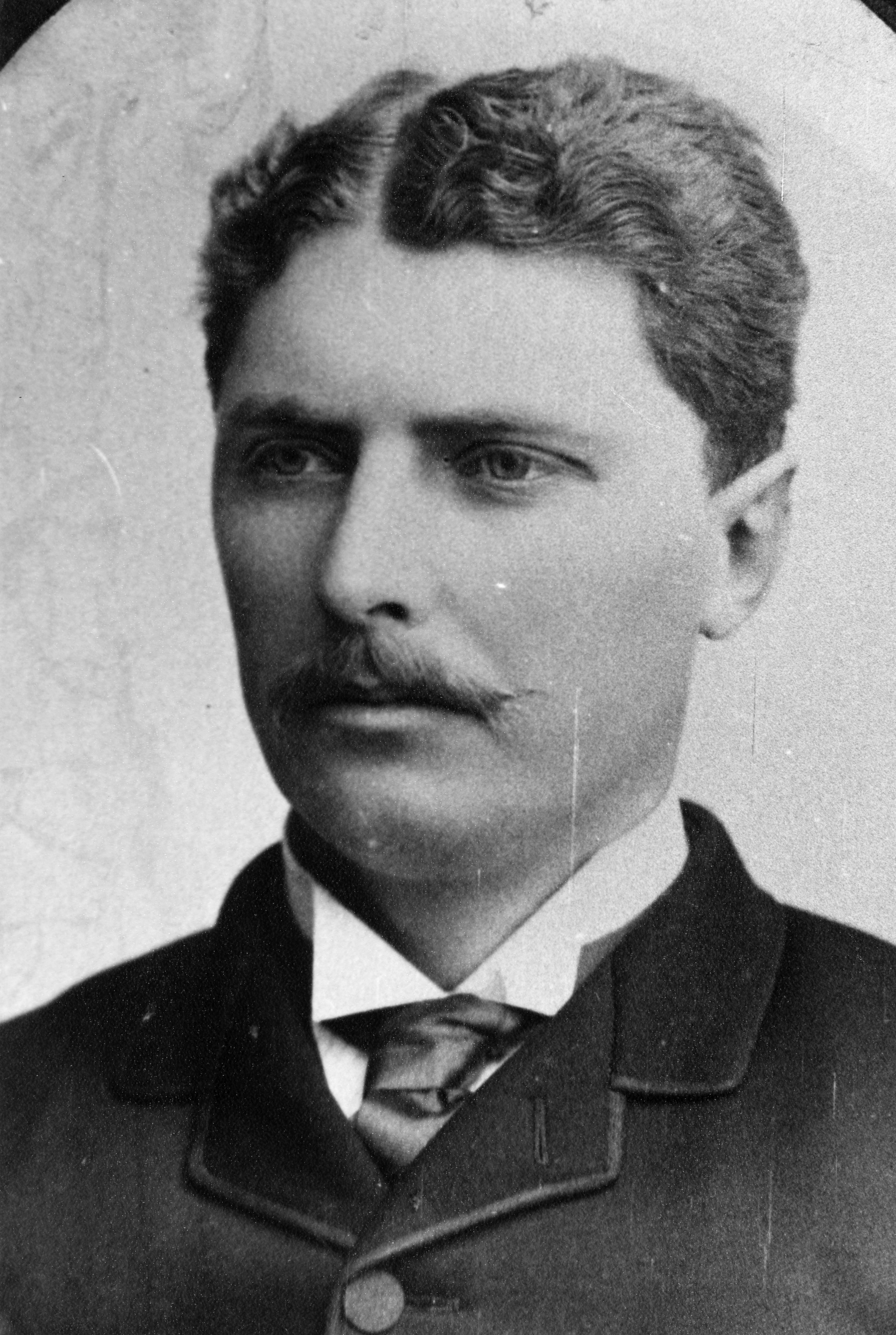
- Westby Perceval, c. 1890

6th Chairman of Committees
- In office 23 June 1891 – 15 September 1891
- Preceded by: Ebenezer Hamlin
- Succeeded by: William Lee Rees

Member of the New Zealand Parliament for Christchurch South
- In office 26 September 1887 – 4 December 1890
- Preceded by: John Holmes
- Succeeded by: Constituency abolished

Member of the New Zealand Parliament for City of Christchurch
- In office 5 December 1890 – September 1891
- Preceded by: Samuel Paull Andrews; Edward Richardson; Edward Cephas John Stevens
- Succeeded by: William Pember Reeves; Richard Molesworth Taylor; Ebenezer Sandford

Personal details
- Born: Westby Brook Perceval; 11 May 1854 Launceston, Van Diemen's Land
- Died: 23 June 1928 (aged 74) Surrey, England

Sir Westby Brook Perceval KCMG (11 May 1854 – 23 June 1928) was a New Zealand politician of the Liberal Party.

== Biography ==
Perceval was born in Launceston, Van Diemen's Land, in 1854. His mother was Sarah Brook (née Bailey) and his father was her husband, Westby Hawkshaw Percival, an Irish member of the mounted police in Melbourne. In the early 1860s, the family moved to Rangiora in New Zealand, a township 29 kilometres (18 mi) north of Christchurch. He received his early education at Merton's school, where he became friends with William Pember Reeves. In 1867 he won a junior Somes scholarship to Christ's College, Christchurch. At the age of 16, in May 1870, he was received into the Catholic church. He completed his secondary education at Stonyhurst College in England. In 1872, he inherited sufficient land upon his father's death that he had a secure income.

New Zealand Parliament
Years	Term	Electorate	Party
1887–1890	10th	Christchurch South	Independent
1890–1891	11th	City of Christchurch	Liberal

Perceval was a lawyer in Christchurch. He represented the Christchurch South electorate from the 1887 general election to the end of the parliamentary term in 1890, and then the City of Christchurch electorate from the 1890 general election to September 1891, when he resigned. For the last three months in Parliament, he was Chairman of Committees.

He was made Agent-General to the United Kingdom from 1891 to 1896, and then Agent-General for Tasmania from 1896 to 1898.

Perceval was appointed a Knight Commander of the Order of St Michael and St George (KCMG) in the 1894 New Year Honours. He died in Surrey, England, in 1928 and is buried at Gap Road Cemetery.

== Family ==
Perceval married Jessie Johnston, daughter of John Johnston, in 1880. They had three sons:

- Francis Westby Perceval (born 1882), barrister. He married in 1912 Dorothy Anne Cecilia Thornton.
- Alan John Westby Perceval (born 1884), clergyman.
- Major-General Christopher Peter Westby Perceval (born 1890), Royal Artillery.

== Notes ==
Political offices
Preceded by Ebenezer Hamlin	Chairman of Committees of the House of Representatives; 1891	Succeeded by William Lee Rees
New Zealand Parliament
Preceded by John Holmes	Member of Parliament for Christchurch South; 1887–1890	In abeyance Title next held by Harry Ell
Vacant Constituency recreated after abolition in 1881 Title last held by Samuel Paull Andrews, Edward Richardson, Edward Cephas John Stevens	Member of Parliament for Christchurch; 1890–1891; Served alongside: William Pember Reeves, Richard Molesworth Taylor	Succeeded by William Pember Reeves, Richard Molesworth Taylor, Ebenezer Sandford
Party political offices
Preceded by position created	Senior Whip of the Liberal Party; 1890–1891	Succeeded by Frank Lawry
Diplomatic posts
Preceded by Dillon Bell	Agent-General of New Zealand in the United Kingdom; 1891–1895	Succeeded by William Pember Reeves
