= Frederic Whitcombe =

Frederic Whitcombe (15 October 1858 – 19 September 1948) was a Member of the Western Australian Legislative Council from 1898 to 1900.

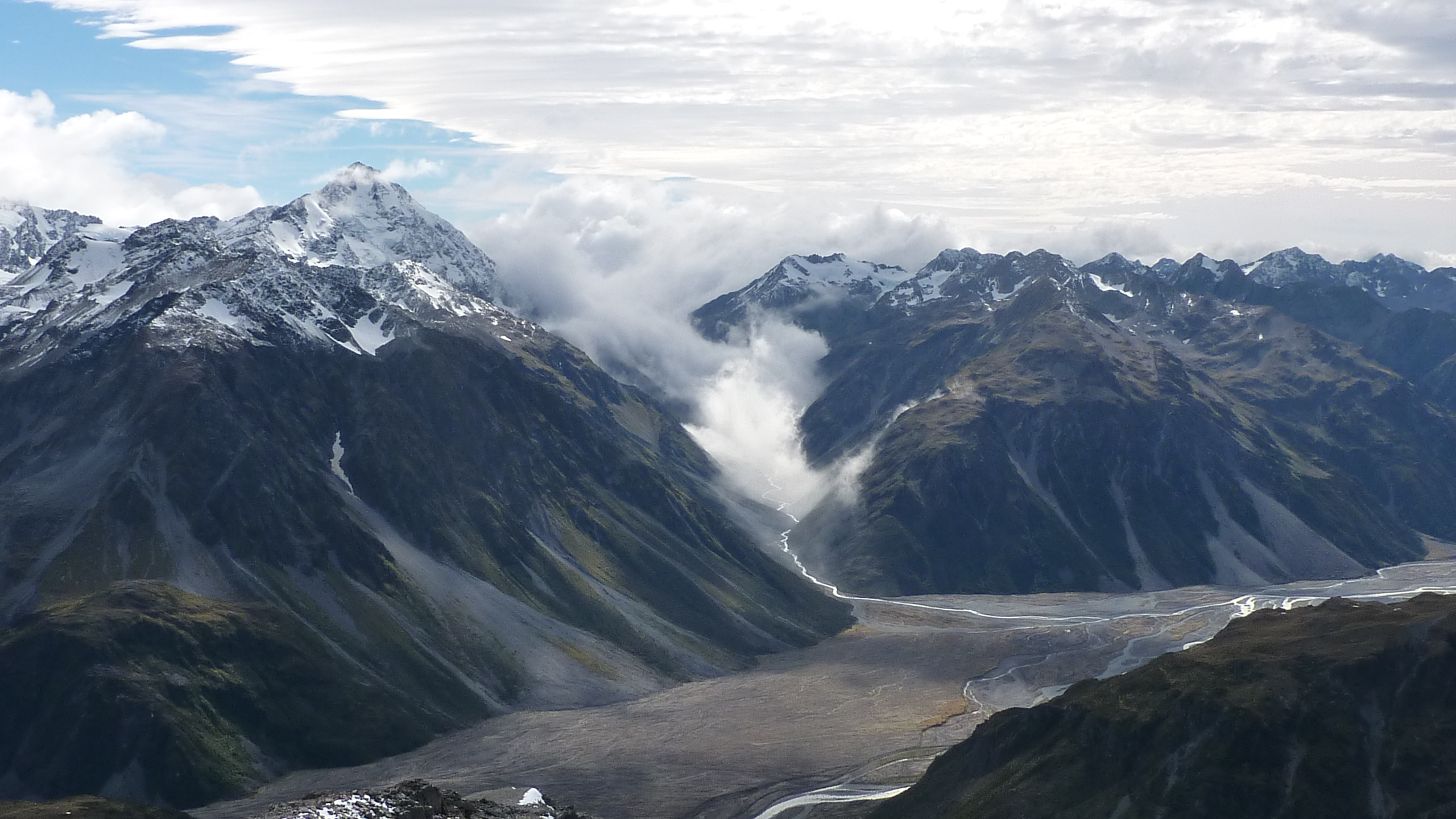
Whitcombe Pass (in the cloud); Lauper Stream merging with the Rakaia River (foreground)

Born in Christchurch, New Zealand, on 15 October 1858, Frederic Whitcombe was the son of civil engineer Henry Whitcombe and Maria née North.

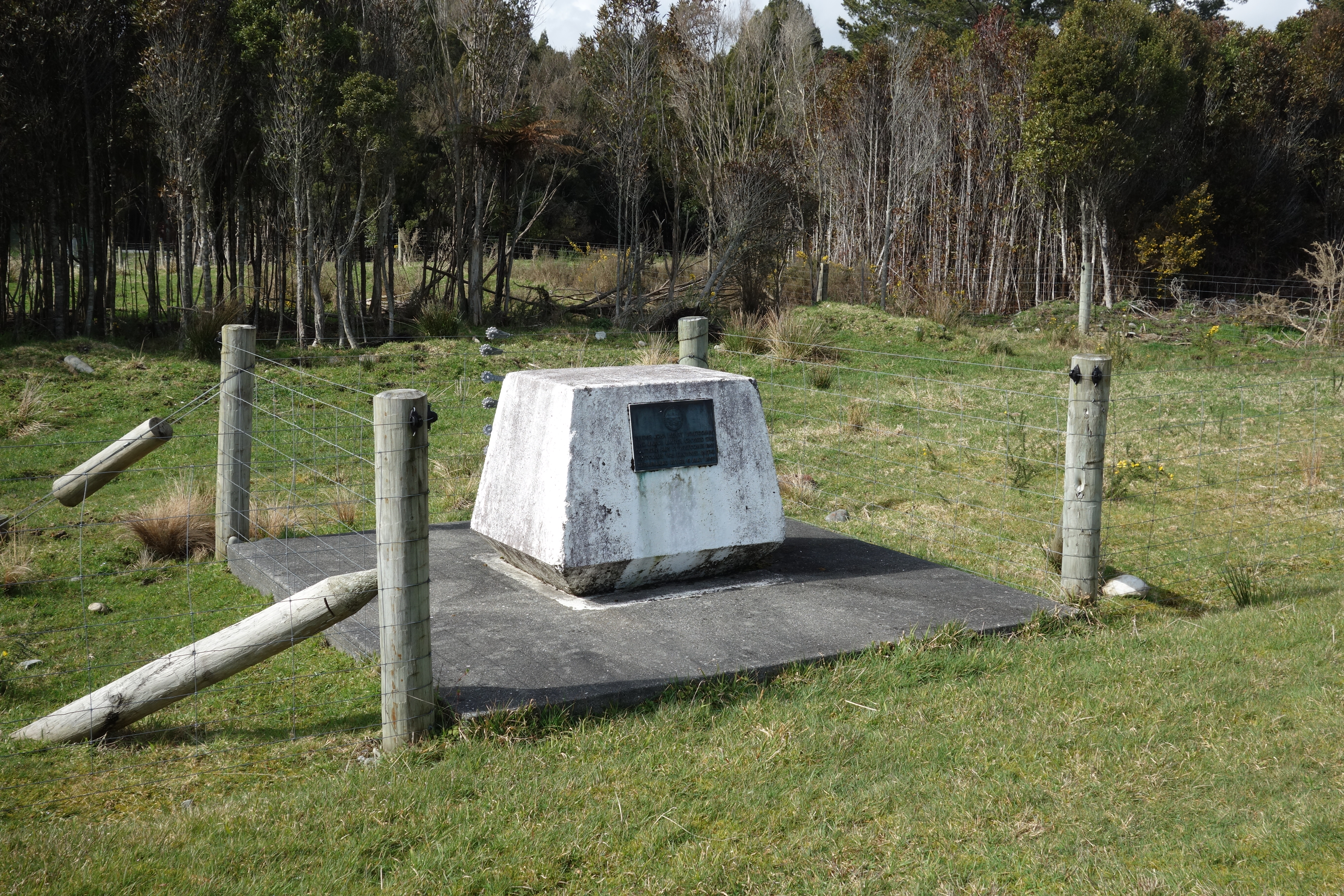
Memorial for Henry Whitcombe at the Taramakau River

Henry Whitcombe, after whom Whitcombe Pass in the Southern Alps is named, drowned in 1863 in the Taramakau River on one of his many West Coast exploration trips. Edward Cephas John Stevens was put in charge of the fund which allowed the Whitcombe boys to attend Christ's College, where Frederic was educated between 1868 and 1875. On 20 May 1869, at St. Peter's Anglican Church in Upper Riccarton, Stevens married Maria Whitcombe. They had two further sons, one of whom died in infancy.

Frederic Whitcombe was admitted as a barrister and solicitor in New Zealand in 1881. He practised as a solicitor in Gisborne, and was in partnership with James Hill Williams of Leeston in the firm of J.H. Williams and Co., which declared bankruptcy in December 1883. Whitcombe was admitted as a barrister and solicitor in Western Australia in 1890, and practised as a solicitor at Geraldton. On 1 March 1892 he married Alice Mein at Albany, and they had at least two sons and one daughter. By 1897 he was living at Mount Magnet.

On 11 May 1898, Whitcombe was elected to a North Province seat in the Western Australian Legislative Council. However, on 30 November 1900 the Barrister Board struck him off their roll for misappropriation of funds. Three days later he resigned his seat.

By 1902, Whitcombe had returned to New Zealand, and in 1915 he was living in Christchurch. That year, he sought to be readmitted to practice as a barrister and solicitor. The request was granted by the Court of Appeal with the proviso that Whitcombe should sign a declaration stating that money owing in Western Australia be regarded as a debt, despite the statute of limitations, and that he pay costs in New Zealand.

Whitcombe died on 19 September 1948.
