= William Pember Reeves =

New Zealand politician, cricketer, and historian

The Honourable William Pember Reeves
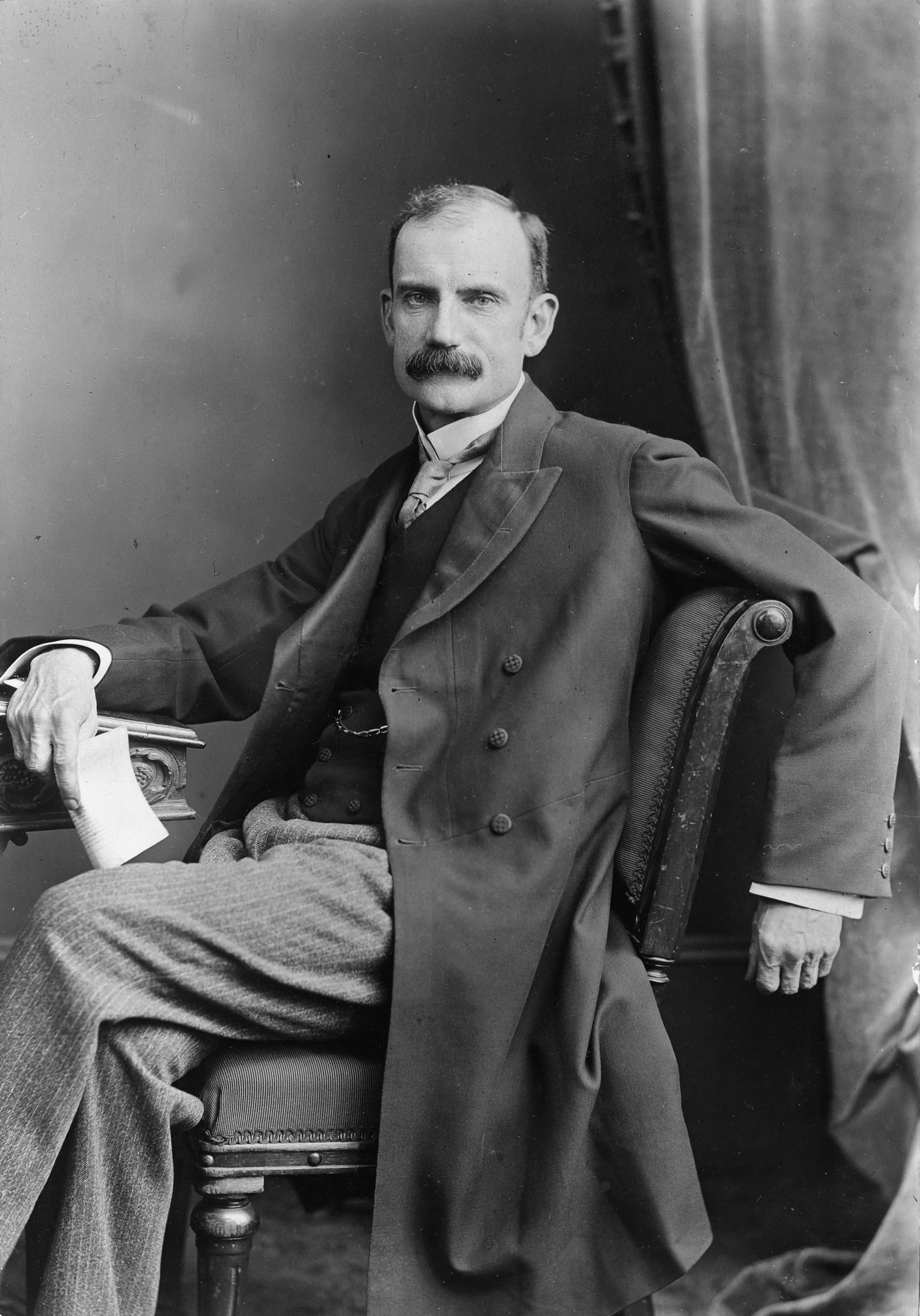
- Portrait of William Pember Reeves possibly taken when he was elected to be a member of parliament in 1887

5th High Commissioner to the United Kingdom (Note: the last Agent-General and the first High Commissioner for the Dominion of New Zealand)
- In office December 1896 – December 1908
- Monarchs: Victoria; Edward VII
- Prime Minister: Richard Seddon
- Preceded by: Westby Perceval
- Succeeded by: William Hall-Jones

1st Minister of Labour
- In office 31 May 1892 – 10 January 1896
- Prime Minister: John Ballance; Richard Seddon
- Succeeded by: Richard Seddon

9th Minister of Education
- In office 24 January 1891 – 10 January 1896
- Prime Minister: John Ballance; Richard Seddon
- Preceded by: Thomas William Hislop
- Succeeded by: William Campbell Walker

Member of the New Zealand Parliament for City of Christchurch
- In office 5 December 1890 – 13 February 1896
- Preceded by: Constituency recreated
- Succeeded by: Charles Lewis

Member of the New Zealand Parliament for St Albans
- In office 26 September 1887 – 5 December 1890
- Preceded by: Francis James Garrick
- Succeeded by: Constituency abolished

Personal details
- Born: 10 February 1857 Lyttelton, New Zealand
- Died: 16 May 1932 (aged 75) London, England
- Party: Liberal
- Spouse: Magdalen Stuart Robison
- Children: 3, including Amber Reeves
- Parent(s): William Reeves (father); Ellen Pember (mother)
- Occupation: Lawyer and journalist
- Cricket career

Cricket information
- Role: Batsman

Domestic team information
- Years: Team
- 1879/80–1887/88: Canterbury

Career statistics
Competition	First-class
Matches	5
Runs scored	188
Batting average	20.88
100s/50s	0/1
Top score	54
Catches/stumpings	1/0
- Source: ESPN Cricinfo, 22 November 2020

William Pember Reeves (10 February 1857 – 16 May 1932) was a New Zealand politician, cricketer, historian and poet who is most notable for his role in the creation of New Zealand's system of industrial relations as Minister of Labour during the Liberal Government of 1891 to 1912.

== Early life and career ==
Reeves's parents were William Reeves, who was a journalist and politician, and Ellen Reeves (née Pember). They had migrated from Britain to Canterbury Province in 1857, arriving three weeks before he was born.

He was educated at a private prep school in Christchurch, the local high school and, from 1867 to 1874, Christ's College Grammar School. Before entering politics, Reeves was a lawyer and journalist. He was editor of the Canterbury Times in 1885 and the Lyttelton Times (1889–1891).

== Cricket ==
Reeves played in five first-class cricket matches for Canterbury from 1879 to 1888. A batsman, his highest score was 54, Canterbury's top score in the match, when Canterbury beat Otago by four runs in February 1883. In his last first-class match, played in January 1888 while he was a Member of Parliament, he top-scored for Canterbury with 31 in the second innings.

Reeves was described as "a steady, thoughtful batsman, a hard man to get out". But he was erratic in his judgement of when to run, a failing he commemorated in one of his poems, "No Judge of a Run: A Lament of Cricket".

== Political career ==
New Zealand Parliament
Years	Term	Electorate	Party
1887–1890	10th	St Albans	Independent
1890–1893	11th	Christchurch	Liberal
1893–1896	12th	Christchurch	Liberal

Reeves represented the Christchurch electorate of St Albans in Parliament from 1887 to 1890, and then Christchurch from 1890 to 1896, when he resigned to take up the post of Agent General. During the premierships of John Ballance (1891–93) and Richard Seddon (1893–1906) he served as Minister of Labour (1892–96), Minister of Education (1891–96), Minister of Justice (1891–92, 1893, 1895–96) and Commissioner of Stamp Duties (1892–96). As Minister of Labour he introduced the Industrial Conciliation and Arbitration Act 1894 and the Undesirable Immigrants Exclusion Bill, which, if it had been passed, would have barred poor and Asian immigrants from the country. His opposition to the entry of those he considered "undesirable" immigrants earned him the nickname "Undesirable Bill" Reeves.

== In London ==
In January 1896 Reeves left New Zealand for London, where he was Agent General (1896–1905) and High Commissioner (1905–08). While he was in Britain Reeves became a friend of a number of left-wing intellectuals, such as George Bernard Shaw, H. G. Wells, and Sidney and Beatrice Webb, all leading members of the Fabian Society. He was also a member of the Coefficients dining club of social reformers.

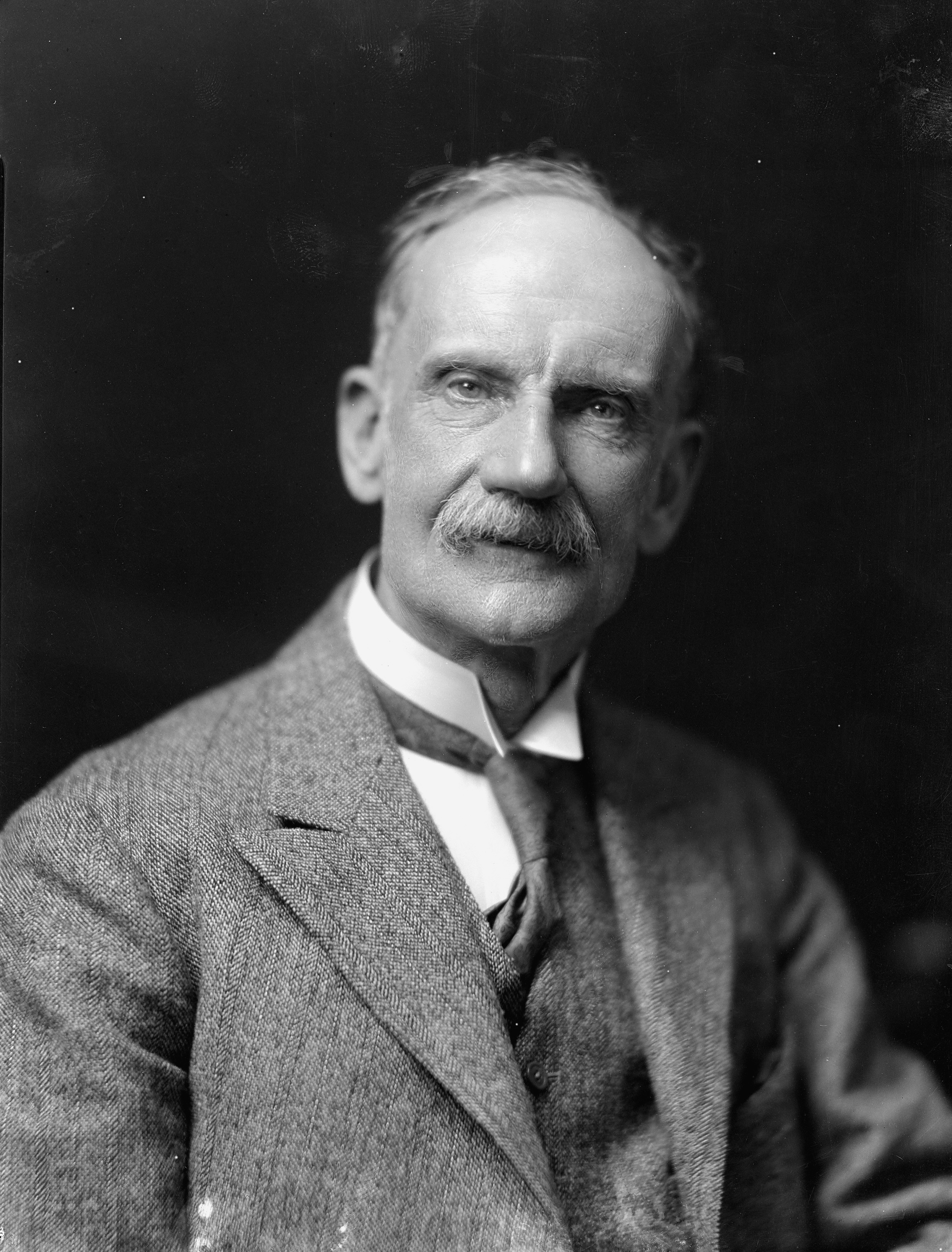
William Pember Reeves in 1925

Reeves became Director of the London School of Economics (1908–19) and President of the Anglo-Hellenic League (1913–25). He also headed the committee organising the First Universal Races Congress in London in 1911. Finally, he was chairman of the board of the National Bank of New Zealand from 1917 to 1931.

Reeves's more influential writings include his history of New Zealand, The Long White Cloud (1898) and State Experiments in Australia and New Zealand (1902). He also published a number of poems, such as "The Passing of the Forest" and "A Colonist in his Garden".

Reeves married Magdalen Stuart Robison in 1885. She was a feminist who later joined the Fabian Society. They had two daughters, the feminist writer Amber Reeves (born 1887) and Beryl (born 1889), and one son, Fabian Pember Reeves (1895–1917), who was killed in the First World War, aged 21, as a Flight Lieutenant in the RNAS.

Reeves three times declined offers of a knighthood.

== Works ==
- Some Historical Articles on Communism and Socialism: Their Dreams, their Experiments, their Aims, their Influence. Christchurch: The Lyttelton Times Office. 1890.
- The State and Its Functions in New Zealand. London: The Fabian Society. 1896.
- The Long White Cloud: Aotearoa. London: Horace Marshall & Son. 1898.
- State Experiments in Australia & New Zealand. London: Grant Richards. 1902.
- "New Zealand To-day" . The Empire and the century. London: John Murray. 1905. pp. 462–77.

== See also ==
- List of Canterbury representative cricketers

== Notes ==
Political offices
Preceded by Thomas William Hislop	Minister of Education; 1891–1896	Succeeded by William Campbell Walker
Preceded by William Russell	Minister of Justice; 1891–1892 1893 1895–1896	Succeeded by Alfred Cadman
Preceded by Alfred Cadman	Minister of Justice; 1891–1892 1893 1895–1896	Succeeded by Alfred Cadman
Preceded by Alfred Cadman	Minister of Justice; 1891–1892 1893 1895–1896	Succeeded by William Hall-Jones
New Zealand Parliament
Preceded by Francis James Garrick	Member of Parliament for St Albans; 1887–1890	In abeyance Title next held by Jack Watts
Vacant Constituency recreated after abolition in 1881 Title last held by Samuel Paull Andrews, Edward Richardson, Edward Cephas John Stevens	Member of Parliament for Christchurch; 1890–1896; Served alongside: Westby Perceval (1890–1891), Richard Molesworth Taylor (1890–1893), Ebenezer Sandford (1891–1893), George John Smith, William Whitehouse Collins (1893–1896)	Succeeded by Charles Lewis
Diplomatic posts
Preceded by Westby Perceval	High Commissioner of New Zealand to the United Kingdom; 1895–1908	Succeeded by William Hall-Jones
Educational offices
Preceded by Halford Mackinder	Director of the London School of Economics; 1908–1919	Succeeded by William Beveridge
