= Ohu =

Type of community in New Zealand

Ohu is a Māori word meaning 'communal work group'. A number of ohu (see intentional community) were set up in rural areas of New Zealand under a government scheme established in the mid-1970s.

== Background ==
In the 1970s, the third Labour Government of New Zealand (1972–75) under Prime Minister Norman Kirk was reportedly known for its strong social conscience in both international and domestic affairs (Govt Whips Office 1974, Bassett 1978, Hayward 1981). The government confronted the global nuclear arms race by strong opposition to French testing in the Pacific. As a nation, New Zealand sponsored non-proliferation measures such as the South Pacific Nuclear Free Zone (later embodied in the Rarotonga Treaty of 1986) and South Pacific Environmental programme. The Labour Government ended national conscription and New Zealand’s contribution to the Vietnam War upon coming to power in 1972. Notably also, they cancelled the visas of a visiting Springboks team in early 1974 to show its opposition to the regime of apartheid in that country. On the domestic front, it demonstrated its commitment to environmental protection by setting up a Royal Commission on Nuclear Power in 1974, and the establishment of the Guardians of the Rotorua Lakes and Lake Manapouri (both 1973).

In October 1974, the Labour Government announced the establishment of the ohu scheme for groups of New Zealand citizens willing to set up alternative communities in rural areas.

== Purposes of the scheme ==
Forster and Metcalf suggest the Ohu movement was intended to remove radicals from urban settings. However statements from the then Prime Minister, Norman Kirk, and the Minister for Lands, Matiu Rata, suggest the purposes were:

- To assist people in becoming self-sufficient from the land.
- To enhance people's spiritual and social wellbeing.
- To reconnect people to the land.
- To give people a chance to develop alternative social models.
- To provide a communal environment as a potential antidote "to the ills of modern society[...]" (Hayward 1981 p. 173.)
- The promotion of the virtues of a simpler life (Hayward 1981, p. 173).
- To be a place of healing for participants as well as for society as a whole.

The 1975 brochure about the scheme suggested it may be of interest to people keen on organic farming, alternative energy and recycling and referred to the Kibbutz as an inspiration but that communities were not expected to be a copy of this.

Matiu Rata also emphasised the social implications of this alternative land settlement scheme. For Rata, the scheme had a strong Māori spiritual dimension: "For some time now I have been concerned with the needs of that section of society that has worked so hard to gain social, economic and cultural integrity while trying to maintain spiritual and cultural strength and self-respect. I refer of course, to the Māori section of our society". (Matiu Rata to the Ohu Working Party, August 1974).

== Additional points ==
- Over 30 sites were approved by the government for the establishment of ohu.
- Many of these sites were reportedly of poor quality and very remote.
- About eight communities were originally established. Sunburst Ohu, near Whitianga, Coromandel, was the first to be approved, in August 1974.
- The longest lasting of the Ohu communities was Ahu Ahu ohu, which ceased in about 2000. When the Ahu Ahu ohu was first founded, access required crossing the river and a walk of nearly an hour. The former community is now a point of interest for tramping.
- Although the National government had voiced support for the scheme prior to the election, when it came into power in 1975 it wound up the Ohu advisory committee and eventually did away with the scheme altogether.

== See also ==
- Back-to-the-land movement
