= John Crewes =

New Zealand minister (1847–1925)

John Crewes (15 July 1847 – 29 December 1925) was a New Zealand Bible Christian minister, social worker and journalist. He was born in Grampound, Cornwall, England on 15 July 1847.

== Early life ==
Crewes was born in Grampound, Cornwall, in 1847. His parents were Isabella (née Francis) and Richard Crewes. At an early age, he was attracted to preaching in the Bible Christian Church. On 1 September 1877, he married Martha Veale. They arrived in Christchurch, New Zealand, in 1879, two years after the first Bible Christian missionaries had come to Christchurch.

== Christian work in New Zealand ==
In early 1881, Crewes witnessed the laying of a foundation stone for the first Bible Christian church in New Zealand; this was to be built in Christchurch's High Street. At the time the church opened, it was free of debt, which is a sign of Crewes' energy. He stepped back from preaching for some time over health concerns but rejoined in 1888, with particular focus on Addington; the main jail for Christchurch was at that time in that suburb. In 1890, Crewes was transferred to Wellington and settled in Newtown.

== Political ambition ==
Crewes unsuccessfully contested the 1884 election in the Christchurch North electorate against Julius Vogel. At the 1887 election, Crewes contested the Sydenham electorate against Richard Molesworth Taylor. They received 392 and 766 votes respectively, so Taylor entered the 10th New Zealand Parliament.

In the 1902 election, Crewes made a last attempt to enter Parliament. He contested the Newtown electorate, but withdrew his nomination before polling day.

== Death ==
He died in Wellington on 29 December 1925. His wife had died in Wellington on 1 August 1913. He is buried at Karori Cemetery.
