= Norman Kirk =

Prime Minister of New Zealand from 1972 to 1974

The Right Honourable Norman Kirk
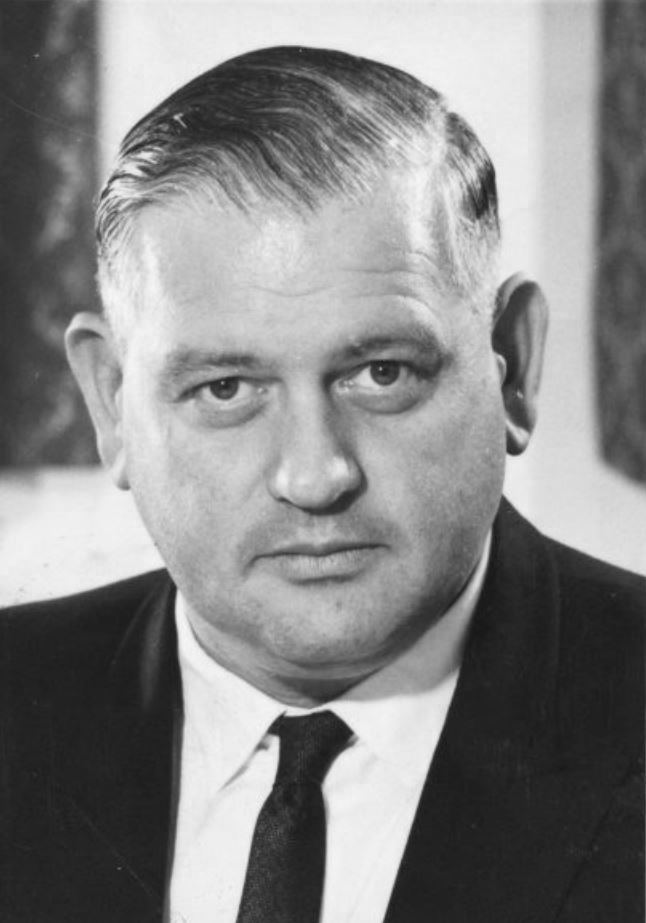
- Official portrait

29th Prime Minister of New Zealand
- In office 8 December 1972 – 31 August 1974
- Monarch: Elizabeth II
- Deputy: Hugh Watt
- Governor-General: Denis Blundell
- Preceded by: Jack Marshall
- Succeeded by: Bill Rowling

16th Minister of Foreign Affairs
- In office 8 December 1972 – 31 August 1974
- Prime Minister: Himself
- Preceded by: Keith Holyoake
- Succeeded by: Bill Rowling

7th Leader of the Labour Party
- In office 16 December 1965 – 31 August 1974
- Deputy: Hugh Watt
- Preceded by: Arnold Nordmeyer
- Succeeded by: Bill Rowling

19th Leader of the Opposition
- In office 16 December 1965 – 8 December 1972
- Deputy: Hugh Watt
- Preceded by: Arnold Nordmeyer
- Succeeded by: Jack Marshall

20th President of the Labour Party
- In office 12 May 1964 – 11 May 1966
- Vice President: Jim Bateman
- Preceded by: Martyn Finlay
- Succeeded by: Norman Douglas

Member of the New Zealand Parliament for Sydenham
- In office 29 November 1969 – 31 August 1974
- Preceded by: Mabel Howard
- Succeeded by: John Kirk

Member of the New Zealand Parliament for Lyttelton
- In office 30 November 1957 – 29 November 1969
- Preceded by: Harry Lake
- Succeeded by: Tom McGuigan

Personal details
- Born: 6 January 1923 Waimate, Canterbury, New Zealand
- Died: 31 August 1974 (aged 51) Island Bay, Wellington, New Zealand
- Resting place: Waimate Lawn Cemetery, Waimate, Canterbury, New Zealand
- Party: Labour
- Spouse: Lucy Ruth Miller (m. 1943)
- Children: 5, including John Kirk
- Relatives: Jo Luxton (grand-niece)
- Profession: Railway engineer

Norman Eric Kirk PC (6 January 1923 – 31 August 1974) was a New Zealand politician who served as the 29th prime minister of New Zealand and as well as the minister of Foreign Affairs from 1972 until his sudden death in 1974. He also served as the seventh leader of the Labour Party from 1965 to 1974.

Born into poverty in South Canterbury, Kirk left school at the age of 13 and later joined the New Zealand Labour Party in 1943. He was mayor of Kaiapoi from 1953 until 1957, when he was elected to the New Zealand Parliament. He became the leader of his party in 1964. Following a Labour victory in the 1972 election, Kirk became Prime Minister and Minister of Foreign Affairs, utilising a more assertive approach than previous Ministers. He stressed the need for regional economic development, and affirmed New Zealand's solidarity with Australia in adopting an independent and mutually beneficial foreign policy. Having withdrawn New Zealand troops from Vietnam upon taking office, he was highly critical of US foreign policy. In the same year he strongly opposed French nuclear tests in the Pacific, and threatened to break off diplomatic relations if they continued. He promoted racial equality at home and abroad; his government prevented the South African rugby team from touring New Zealand during 1973. However, his government has been criticised for the launching of the Dawn Raids, the aggressive crackdown on alleged overstayers that near-exclusively targeted Pacific Islanders. Kirk relented to public pressure and discontinued the raids in April 1974.

Kirk had a reputation as the most formidable debater of his time and once famously said that "there are four things that matter to people: they have to have somewhere to live, they have to have food to eat, they have to have clothing to wear, and they have to have something to hope for", often misquoted as "somewhere to live, someone to love, somewhere to work and something to hope for". In private, he suffered from effects of obesity and work exhaustion; his health rapidly deteriorated in the winter of 1974, and he died suddenly on 31 August that year. His death shocked the nation and led to an outpouring of grief; he is the most recent New Zealand prime minister to die in office. He was given a combined state funeral and tangi in two locations, with a combination of European and Māori rites.

Owing to his energy, charisma and powerful oratory, as well as his untimely death, Kirk remains one of the most popular New Zealand prime ministers. He was succeeded as head of government by Bill Rowling, who lost the subsequent election.

== Early life and family ==
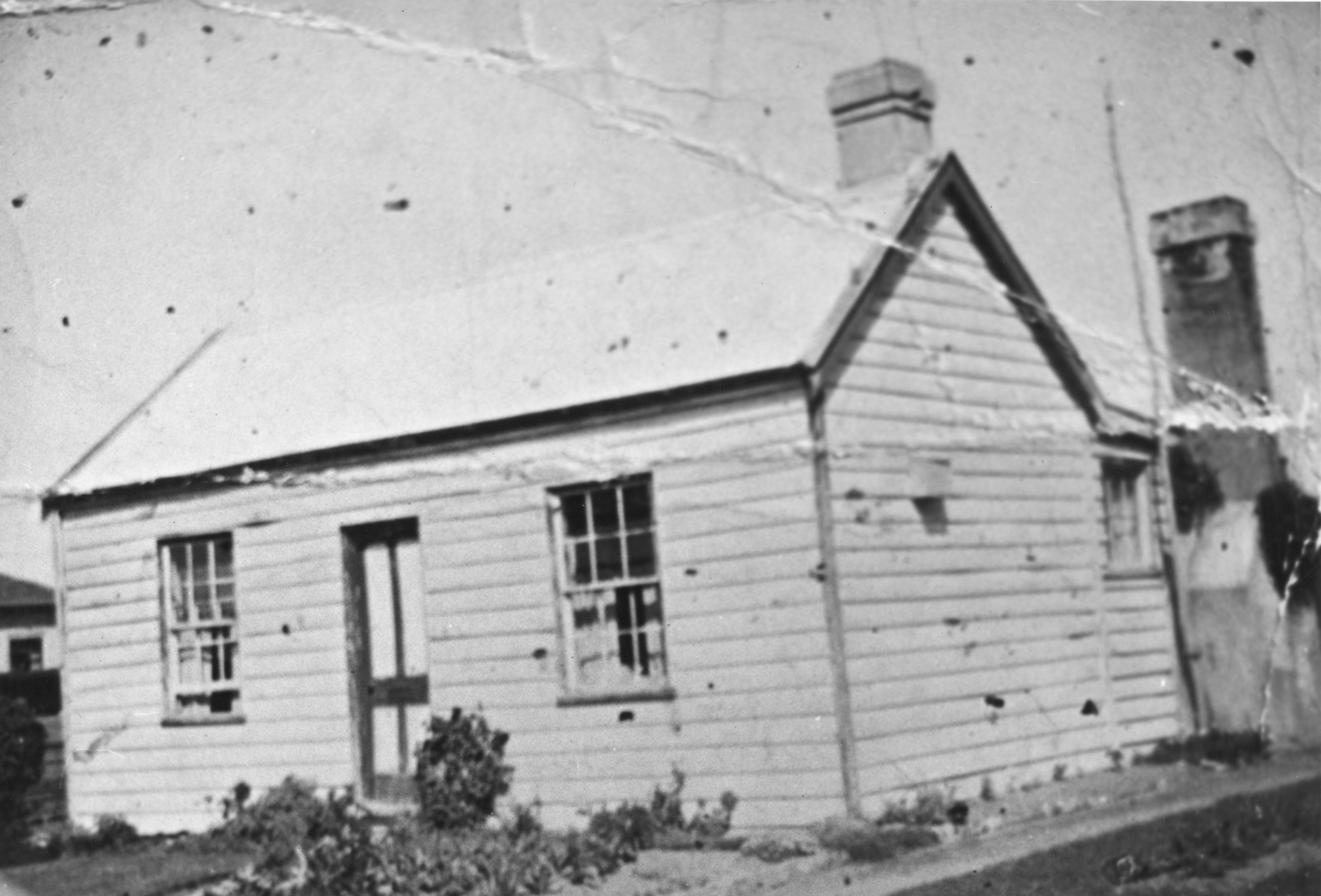
Norman Kirk's childhood home

Born in Waimate, a town in South Canterbury, Norman Kirk came from a poor background, and his household could not afford things such as daily newspapers or a radio. His father, also named Norman Kirk, was a carpenter, while his mother Vera Janet (née Jury) had migrated from the Wairarapa. While Kirk never denied being Māori, a study of his genealogy found no evidence he was Kāi Tahu and he never publicly identified himself as such. His parents were staunch Salvationists, who worshipped at the Christchurch City Corps. He played baritone in the corps band.

While very intelligent, Kirk did not perform well academically. He left school shortly before he turned thirteen after his father lost his job. Despite this, however, he enjoyed reading, and often visited libraries. In particular, he enjoyed the study of history and geography.

After leaving school, Kirk worked in a number of jobs, initially as an assistant roof-painter and later as a stationary engine driver, operating boilers in various factories. His health, however, deteriorated, and when the New Zealand Army called him up for military service in 1941 it found him medically unfit. After recovering somewhat, he returned to work, holding a number of different jobs.

In 1943, Norman Kirk married Lucy Ruth Miller, known as Ruth, who was born in Taumarunui. The couple had three sons and two daughters. In 1975 Ruth Kirk was named Dame Commander of the Order of the British Empire (DBE). In 1974, while her husband was prime minister, she became patron of the Society for the Protection of the Unborn Child. She took part in anti-abortion protest marches in Wellington and Hamilton. She died on 20 March 2000, aged 77.

== Early political career ==
Also in 1943, Kirk joined the Labour Party's branch in Kaiapoi, where he and his wife had decided to build a house. Kirk bought a section at 12 Carew Street. Owing to a shortage of funds and building materials following the Second World War, Kirk built the house himself entirely, right down to the casting of the bricks. The house still stands today, albeit with an extension at the back and a hipped corrugated iron roof to replace the original leak-susceptible flat malthoid roof.

In 1951, Kirk became Chairman of the party's Hurunui electorate committee. In 1953, Kirk led Labour to a surprising victory in elections for Kaiapoi's local council, and he became the youngest mayor in the country at age 30.

As mayor, Kirk showed great creativity and implemented many changes. He surprised officials by studying issues intensely, often emerging with better knowledge of his options than the people functioning as his advisors. He resigned as mayor on 15 January 1958 and moved his family to Christchurch after being elected MP for the Lyttelton electorate.

== Member of Parliament ==
New Zealand Parliament
Years	Term	Electorate	Party
1957–1960	32nd	Lyttelton	Labour
1960–1963	33rd	Lyttelton	Labour
1963–1966	34th	Lyttelton	Labour
1966–1969	35th	Lyttelton	Labour
1969–1972	36th	Sydenham	Labour
1972–1974	37th	Sydenham	Labour

In 1954, Kirk stood as the Labour candidate for the Hurunui seat. While he increased Labour's share of the vote considerably, he did not win. Following this, Kirk sought the Labour nomination for a by-election in Riccarton, but ultimately withdrew from the selection contest. He then turned his attention to winning nomination in the seat of Lyttelton, which Labour surprisingly lost to the National Party in a previous election. Kirk beat five better known and connected candidates including Mayor of Lyttelton Frederick Briggs and Lyttelton Borough Councillor Gladys Boyd for the nomination. At the 1957 general election Kirk won the Lyttelton seat and became a Member of Parliament. In 1969 he transferred to the Sydenham seat which he held until his death.

Throughout his political career, Kirk promoted the welfare state, supporting government spending for housing, health, employment, and education. As such, Kirk often appeared as a champion for ordinary New Zealanders. His working-class background also gave him some advantage, as ordinary voters saw many other politicians as out-of-touch and aloof. Gradually, Kirk began to rise through Labour's internal hierarchy, becoming vice-president of the party in 1963 and president of the party in 1964. He came to the attention of media and colleagues as a potential future leader. He stood for the position of Deputy Leader in 1963 following the death of Fred Hackett but was defeated by Hugh Watt. Despite lacking Watt's length of service or ministerial experience Kirk only lost by one vote, a surprising show of support.

With the memory of the "Black Budget" still plaguing Labour leader Arnold Nordmeyer's profile and many within the party believed that it was time for a fresh start, in 1965 a group of mainly younger Labour MPs formed a group who became dedicated to replace Nordmeyer with Kirk, becoming known as the "Mafia". At the end of 1965 he successfully challenged Arnold Nordmeyer for the parliamentary leadership, becoming Leader of the Opposition. As leader Kirk assembled a more formal shadow cabinet system amongst the Labour caucus than had been seen in the past wishing to boost the profile of his senior MPs. However, he found it challenging to avoid it being composed mainly of Auckland and Christchurch based MPs.

Using the slogan "Make things happen", Kirk led Labour into the 1969 general election — the party did not win a majority, but it did increase both its share of the vote and number of seats to 44.2% and 39.

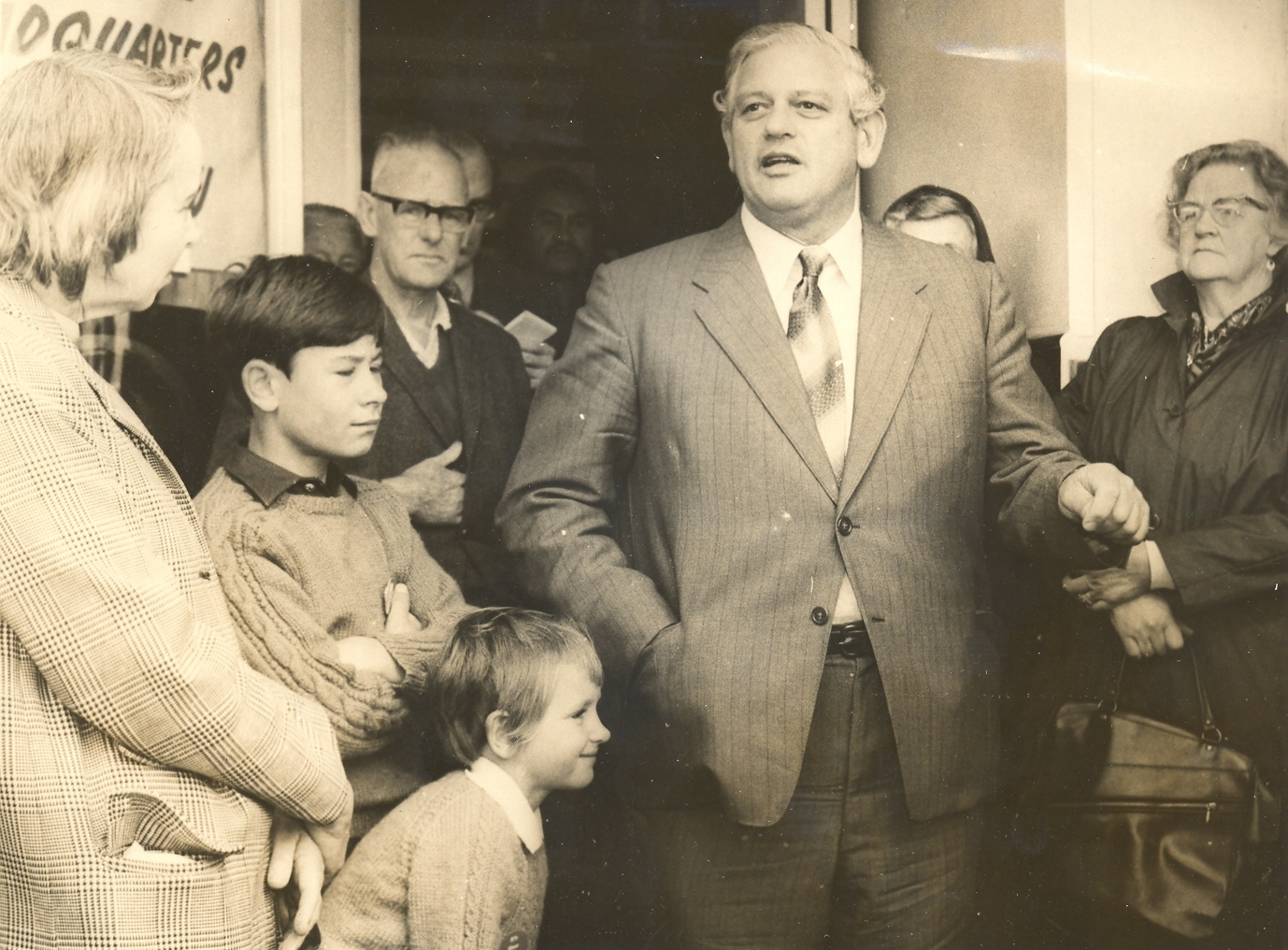
Kirk speaks to a crowd outside Labour Party headquarters, Levin, 1972

== Prime Minister (1972–1974) ==
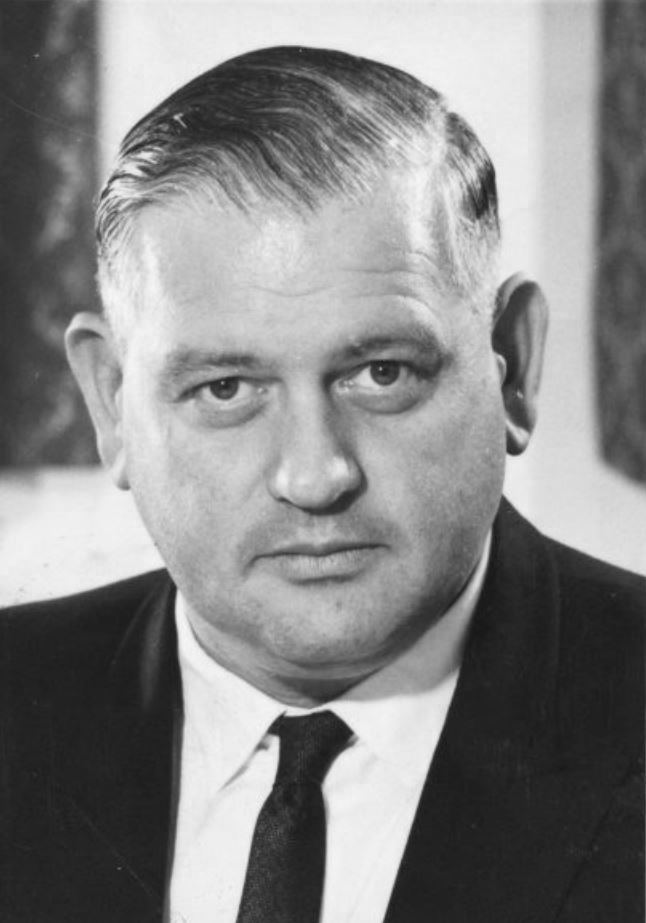
- Premiership of Norman Kirk; 8 December 1972 – 31 August 1974
- Monarch: Elizabeth II
- Cabinet: Third Labour Government of New Zealand
- Party: New Zealand Labour Party
- Election: 1972
- Appointed by: Denis Blundell

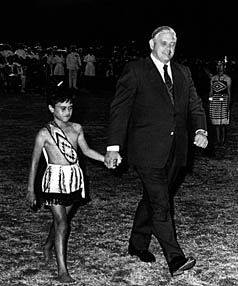
Kirk at Waitangi Day, 1973

In February 1972 Keith Holyoake resigned as Prime Minister and was replaced by Jack Marshall. Not even this could blunt Labour's campaign slogan, "It's Time – Time for a change, time for Labour", and on 25 November 1972 Kirk led Labour to victory with a majority of 23 seats.

Soon after entering office, Kirk acquired a reputation as a reforming figure. The conservative Dominion newspaper bestowed its 'Man of the Year' prize on him for "outstanding personal potential for leadership". A few weeks later, on 6 February 1973, Kirk was photographed at a Waitangi Day event holding the hand of a small Māori boy; as Kirk was recognised as Pākehā, the iconic picture seemed to symbolise a new era of partnership between New Zealand's people.

=== Foreign policy ===
Kirk set a frenetic pace implementing a great number of new policies. In particular, the Kirk government had a far more active foreign policy than its predecessor, taking great trouble to expand New Zealand's links with Asia and Africa. Immediately after his election as prime minister, Kirk withdrew all New Zealand troops from Vietnam, ending that nation's eight-year involvement in the Vietnam War and causing high levels of public support for Labour. The Kirk government also abolished Compulsory Military Training (conscription) in New Zealand; since then the New Zealand Defence Force has remained an all-volunteer professional force. Kirk also strengthened relations with the Australian Labor Party and its leader Gough Whitlam. Like Kirk, Whitlam had come to power in 1972 as the first Labor prime minister in a considerable time; Kirk had been preceded by 12 years of National Party government, while Whitlam had succeeded a Coalition government that had lasted 23 years. Kirk desired for the two nascent leaders to work together, to foster a boldly independent foreign policy separate from the United Kingdom or the United States. Despite their relative success together in their mutually short periods in office, it is known that Kirk and Whitlam, in private, did not get along and even disliked one another. Kirk was a closer friend to Singaporean prime minister Lee Kuan Yew, whom he regarded as his mentor, and to British prime minister Harold Wilson (despite wanting to escape the influence of Britain), than to Whitlam. Kirk also admired Tanzanian president Julius Nyerere, thinking him a serious, intelligent and charming figure.

Two subjects in particular caused comment; one: Kirk's strong protest against French nuclear-weapons testing in the Pacific Ocean which led to his government, along with Australia, taking France to the International Court of Justice in 1972 and him sending two New Zealand navy frigates, HMNZS Canterbury and Otago, into the test zone area at Mururoa Atoll in a symbolic act of protest in 1973. The other: his refusal to allow a visit by a South African rugby team, a decision he made because the apartheid régime in South Africa would not accept racial integration for that sport. He was also highly critical of US foreign policy, speaking before the United Nations of the US involvement in the coup d'état in Chile in 1973.

The Kirk government was also notable for a number of national identity building policies. The government began the tradition of New Zealand Day in 1973, and the government introduced legislation in 1974 to declare Queen Elizabeth II as "Queen of New Zealand". Christchurch hosted the 1974 Commonwealth Games which had a colourful opening ceremony, seen by many commentators as a festival celebrating New Zealand's new sense of self-confidence and optimism. Kirk and his wife hosted the royal family and accompanied them on their tour of New Zealand and the Cook Islands.

=== Social policy ===
The Labour government set out an ambitious policy of social reform, building on the Royal Commission on Social Policy which had been formed by the previous National government. Like the First Labour Government, major policy innovations saw a range of policy initiatives to improve the adequacy and scope of social security benefits. In 1973, a Domestic Purposes Benefit was introduced for sole parents with dependent children, which was later extended to single men. The Advanced Payment of Benefit was doubled in February 1973 from $400 to $800 and benefit abatements were extended so recipients could claim more of their benefit while in work. The government moved to introduce a State Insurance rebate for retirees on old-age pensions. Unemployment Benefit and Sickness Benefit increased substantially.

The government began the Ohu scheme of communal work groupings in rural areas, allowing committed people (particularly Māori) to return to the land for their livelihood. The scheme assisted people in becoming self-sufficient from the land, enhance spiritual and social wellbeing, allow the development of alternative social models and promote organic farming. Kirk got the idea while visiting Israel in 1971 and witnessing Kibbutz communities leading the media to nickname it "Kirk's kibbutzim" when it was announced. People in the Ohu groups did not own the land they were cultivating and leased it from the Department of Lands and Survey, nor were they expected to produce surplus agricultural products (beyond the needs of the immediate community) for export. An advisory group was established and the first Ohu, named the Sunburst community, was eventually opened near Whitianga in 1975.

Some strides in the area of housing were also undertaken, with 8,000 more housing units constructed in 1973/1974 than had been built under the previous National government in 1971/72. Special emphasis was given to the needs of the elderly and disabled when building new state housing. A 4.5% loan for those on incomes between $70 and $75 was introduced.

In education, the government introduced a standard Student Bursary and improved school class ratios. Māori became an optional class in state schools for the first time, and tentative steps were taken to incorporate Māori culture into the state school system. The nations first Community College was also opened by Minister of Education Phil Amos, which had been made possible by a new Education Act."

=== Environmental policy ===
Kirk's government was more environmentally conscious than preceding ones. It was elected on a platform that included a strong endorsement of the ideals of Save Manapouri campaign. In February 1973, Kirk honoured his election pledge and instructed the electricity department not to raise the level of Lake Manapouri. He created an independent body, the Guardians of Lake Manapouri, Monowai, and Te Anau (composed of leading members of the protest) to oversee management of the lake levels.

=== Economic affairs ===
Kirk appointed Bill Rowling as Minister of Finance. The Labour government enjoyed a record budget surplus in its first year and revalued the currency. However, the slowing global economy, an unprecedented rise in oil prices and a rapid rise in government expenditure led to soaring inflation. A vicious wage-price spiral began. In August 1973, Minister of Labour Hugh Watt announced a wage stabilisation order of 8.5%, mirroring previous failed attempts by the preceding National government to introduce an incomes policy. Kirk, hoping to encourage further wage moderation, instructed that a 45 per-cent increase in MP's salaries be halted. This did little to abate growing industrial unrest, with a major strike at the Tasman Pulp and Paper Mill in Kawerau. While not a product of the Labour government itself, strikes intensified due to soaring inflation.

As the economic situation worsened, the system of state controls in place since the First Labour Government was augmented. Export controls saw hogget and mutton stockpiled in the hope it would restrain galloping food inflation. After considerable cabinet debate, a Maximum Retail Price scheme was launched on 1 July 1974, which sought to institute a system of price controls. The MRP scheme was criticised by numerous sectors, including those who had lobbied for lower prices. The government ultimately ignored Treasury advice to loosen controls and instead legislated for more. Welfare expenditure also grew significantly, reaching 19% of GDP by 1974/1975. Kirk grew to mistrust his minister of finance, believing he had been captured by Treasury orthodoxy and that only a radical expansion of state controls would adequately address the mounting economic crisis.

=== Immigration ===
The Kirk government attracted controversy in March 1974 for starting the Dawn Raids, a series of police raids that primarily targeted Pasifika peoples for overstaying. The government stopped the raids and issued an amnesty in April 1974, but they were later restarted by the Muldoon Government.

== Illness and death ==
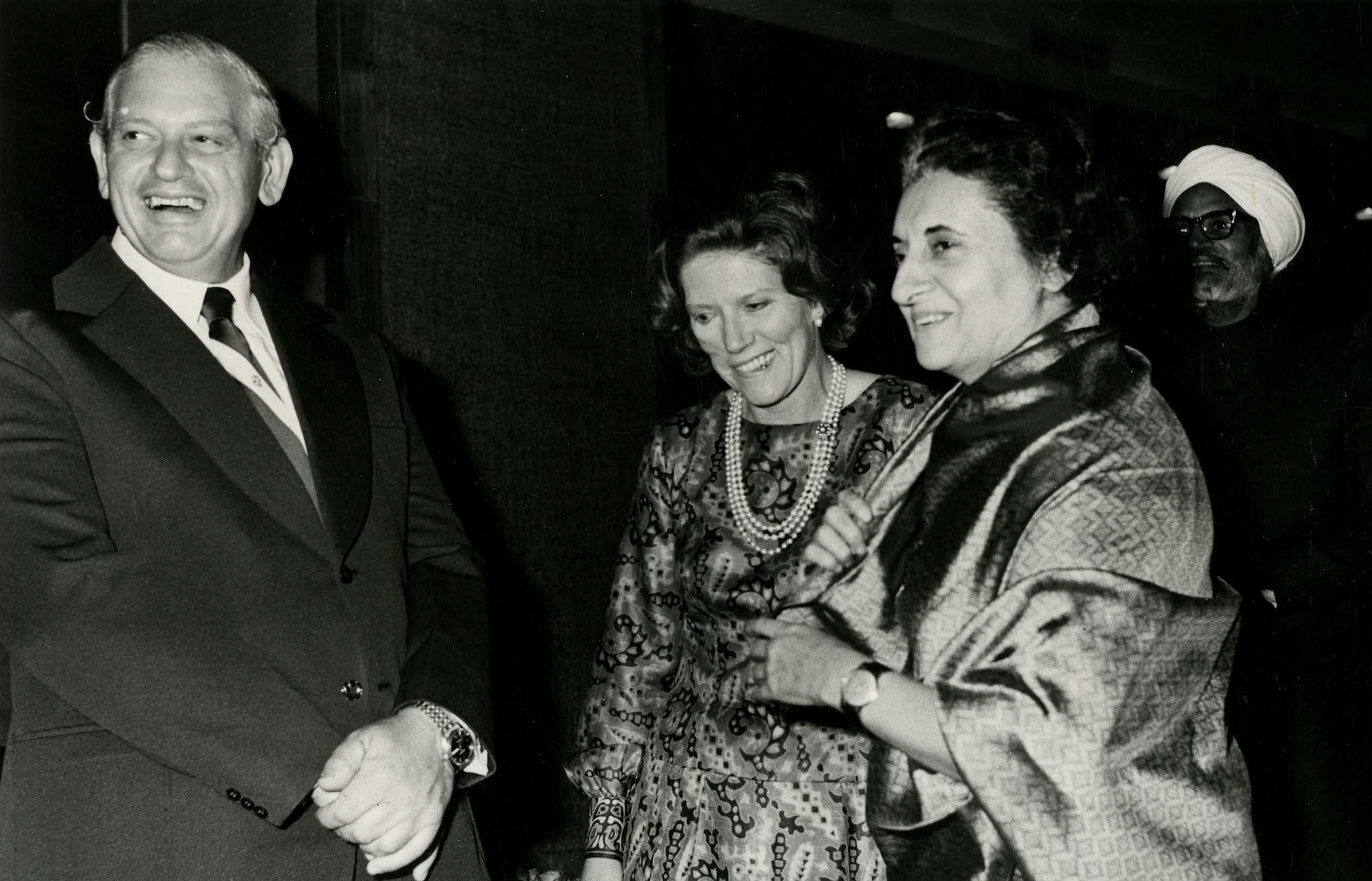
Kirk at the High Commissioner's Reception, New Delhi, 29 December 1973, with Indian prime minister Indira Gandhi

During his time as prime minister, Kirk kept up an intense schedule, refusing to reduce his workload by any significant degree and rarely taking time off (the Chatham Islands was his favourite retreat). Kirk ignored advice from several doctors and from Bob Tizard and Warren Freer to "take care of himself" and to reduce his heavy consumption of Coca-Cola and alcohol (beer, plus later whisky or gin), saying he would have a "short but happy life". On a trip to India he contracted dysentery and exhibited symptoms of undiagnosed diabetes.

By 1974 he had difficulty breathing, eating and sleeping. In April Kirk had an operation to remove varicose veins from both legs at once despite advice to have two operations. Doctors and colleagues were urging him to take time off; on 15 August he decided to stay off work for two days, and continued to have problems on his return. Despite considerable discomfort, he went to Palmerston North on 18 August to open St Peter's College. This was his last public appearance.

On 26 August 1974, Social Credit leader Bruce Beetham advised Kirk to take a couple of months off to recover, and the prime minister decided to have six weeks of complete rest. He had been checked over by many doctors, and an examination by Tom O'Donnell on 27 August confirmed that Kirk had an enlarged heart, gravely weakened by embolisms, which was not pumping regularly enough to get sufficient oxygen into his bloodstream. One lung was two-thirds incapacitated by a blood clot; his stomach was very sore as his liver was swollen with retained fluid.

Kirk checked into the Home of Compassion Hospital, Island Bay, Wellington on 28 August. He rang and reminisced with close colleagues, and his bed was covered with official papers. On Saturday 31 August he told his wife Ruth, who had been told of his serious situation and came to Wellington, "I am dying .. please don't tell anyone". Soon after 9 pm, while watching a police drama on television (Softly, Softly: Taskforce with Stratford Johns on NZBC TV), he slowly slid from a sitting position. He died of a pulmonary embolism when a blood clot released from a vein into his heart cut off the blood flow and stopped the heart. O'Donnell signed Kirk's death certificate.

Kirk's death shocked the nation. Biographer Michael Bassett states, "There followed an outpouring of grief paralleled only by that which had followed [Prime Minister] M. J. Savage's death in 1940". Kirk was succeeded as prime minister by Bill Rowling. His son, John Kirk, won the resulting Sydenham by-election in November 1974.

While colleagues had been urging him to take some time off, none were aware of the seriousness of his last illness. Bob Harvey, the Labour Party president, said that Kirk was "a robust man" with the "constitution of a horse". He proposed a Royal Commission to investigate rumours that he had been killed, perhaps with contact poison, by the CIA. This story returned during the 1999 visit of American president Bill Clinton to New Zealand.

=== Funeral ===
After a lying-in-state in Parliament House from 2 to 4 September, there was a large official funeral in Wellington Cathedral of St Paul, on Wednesday 4 September attended by Prince Charles, Cook Islands premier Albert Henry, and Australian prime minister Gough Whitlam; then on 5 September another service, also inter-denominational, in the Christchurch Town Hall followed by a simple burial service in his hometown Waimate. He was buried near his mother's grave; the burial service was delayed as the RNZAF Hercules could not land at Waimate and the procession hurried by road to meet the daylight requirement for burials. Memorial services were held around New Zealand, and on 26 September in Westminster Abbey, London.

== Popular culture ==
The New Zealand pop band Ebony wrote the song "Big Norm", featuring tongue-in-cheek lyrics praising Kirk. In 1974, it reached No 4 in the charts and Ebony won a New Zealand music RATA award for group of the year. The last telegram Kirk sent before his death was to Ebony congratulating them on their win.

== See also ==
- Electoral history of Norman Kirk
- List of heads of state and government who died in office
- List of members of the New Zealand Parliament who died in office

== Bibliography ==
- Freer, Warren (2004). A Lifetime in Politics: the memoirs of Warren Freer. Wellington: Victoria University Press. ISBN 0-86473-478-6.
- Grant, David (2014). The Mighty Totara: The life and times of Norman Kirk. Auckland: Random House. ISBN 9781775535799. OCLC 872298258.
- Phillips, Hazel (2014). Wild Westie: the incredible life of Bob Harvey. Auckland: Penguin. ISBN 9781743486764.
- Welch, Denis (2023). We Need to Talk About Norman: New Zealand's Lost Leader. Christchurch, New Zealand: Quentin Wilson Publishing. ISBN 9781991103055. OCLC 1388368387.

Government offices
Preceded by Jack Marshall	Prime Minister of New Zealand; 1972–1974	Succeeded by Bill Rowling
New Zealand Parliament
Preceded by Harry Lake	Member of Parliament for Lyttelton; 1957–1969	Succeeded by Tom McGuigan
Preceded by Mabel Howard	Member of Parliament for Sydenham; 1969–1974	Succeeded by John Kirk
Political offices
Preceded by Owen Hills	Mayor of Kaiapoi; 1953–1958	Succeeded by Charles Thomas Williams
Party political offices
Preceded by Martyn Finlay	President of the Labour Party; 1964–1966	Succeeded by Norman Douglas
Preceded by Arnold Nordmeyer	Leader of the Labour Party; 1965–1974	Succeeded by Bill Rowling
