= John Kirk (New Zealand politician) =

New Zealand politician

Member of the New Zealand Parliament for Sydenham
- In office 2 November 1974 – 14 July 1984
- Preceded by: Norman Kirk
- Succeeded by: Jim Anderton

Personal details
- Born: 27 June 1947 Katikati, New Zealand
- Died: before 4 March 2024
- Party: Labour (until 1983)
- Spouse: Lyn Kirk (m. 1964)
- Relations: Norman Kirk (father); Ruth Miller (mother)
- Children: 2
- Profession: Printer

Norman John Kirk (27 June 1947 – before 4 March 2024) was a New Zealand politician from the Labour Party who served as the Member of Parliament for Sydenham in the South Island. He was the son of Norman Kirk, who served as Prime Minister from 1972 until his death in office in 1974.

== Early life ==
John Kirk was born in Katikati on 27 June 1947. He was born with a bowel disability, which was not properly diagnosed at first, and had several long stays in hospital as a child. Growing up in Kaiapoi (where he attended the local borough school) he liked swimming and fishing for leisure. He completed an apprenticeship as a printer, winning top marks in his examinations. He worked for The Press morning newspaper in Christchurch and briefly with the evening paper The Star before returning to The Press. The scholarship he had won enabled him to travel to Australia and work for several printing houses where he learnt more advanced printing techniques. He returned to New Zealand and worked with the Waikato Times so his family could live in close proximity to Green Lane Hospital in Auckland after his daughter became seriously ill (and later died). Kirk and his wife later had a son. He left printing to enter trade unionism and became secretary of the Hotel Workers' Union.

== Member of Parliament ==
New Zealand Parliament
Years	Term	Electorate	Party
1974–1975	37th	Sydenham	Labour
1975–1978	38th	Sydenham	Labour
1978–1981	39th	Sydenham	Labour
1981–1983	40th	Sydenham	Labour
1983–1984	Changed allegiance to:		Independent

When his father died in office in 1974, John Kirk contested the resulting by-election in the same year and succeeded him as MP for Sydenham. He won the Labour nomination and gave up his job and moved to Christchurch from Napier to be a candidate full time. He won the seat and held the electorate for ten years until 1984. His father had previously talked to his close colleague Warren Freer very frankly about his family, and made it quite clear that if any of his sons wished to have a political career, he hoped it would be Robert or Philip, but not John.

Kirk served as an MP and his constituents without distinction with many contemporaries feeling he was lazy. Constituents in Sydenham complained that he did not show up for public functions and did not address their concerns while other MPs feeling he was self-centred and opinionated. However, he did introduce two thoughtful private members bills, the 1976 Taxi Drivers' Safety Devices Act and the 1977 Drug Sentencing and Prevention of Misuse Bill. National Party leader, Robert Muldoon, defended Kirk from criticisms of his performance in Parliament by highlighting in a 1975 television interview that he had entered Parliament during very tragic personal circumstances and foresaw that he would yet have 'a positive contribution to make'. He held several portfolios while Labour was in opposition (1975–84) including Shadow Postmaster-General, Shadow Minister of Tourism, Shadow Minister of Railways and Shadow Minister of Civil Aviation & Meteorological Services. One of the few high points he had was leading the criticism of the transition of the New Zealand National Airways Corporation merger with Air New Zealand. Due to concerns over his past performance, he was passed over for a promotion by Labour leader Bill Rowling. Feeling begrudged, Kirk threw his support behind Rowling's only convincing rival for the leadership, David Lange.

In July 1983 John Kirk announced that he would not seek the Labour Party's nomination for Sydenham in the 1984 election, having been informed by his local electorate committee they would not be supporting him for re-selection. In his place Labour selected Jim Anderton, the party president, whereupon Kirk (a strong David Lange supporter) declared that he did not support Anderton as the official Labour candidate and could become an independent if Labour did not cease what he perceived as moving to the left. His continuing opposition to Anderton's selection resulted in the Labour Party's New Zealand Council suspending him from membership of the Labour Party.

Kirk served out the remainder of his parliamentary career as an independent MP after declaring that he would never again vote with the Labour Party. He stood in the Wellington urban electorate of Miramar in the 1984 general election where he was unsuccessful.

His older brother, Robert Miller “Bob” Kirk, died in Christchurch on 4 March 2024. In the obituary, it noted that his younger brother, John Kirk, was also deceased. The date and cause of his death are unknown.

== Insolvency ==
By the early 1980s Kirk began to indulge in property speculation. Many were critical of his decision and thought his role as a "slum landlord" was incompatible with his role as a Labour Party MP. Many of his real estate dealings were not financially successful and he began to amass much debt. He left New Zealand in 1984 while still an MP, owing more than $280,000. He was arrested in June 1985 in Dallas, Texas, held in prison, and then extradited to New Zealand, where he was charged under the Insolvency Act 1985. He was sentenced to four months' periodic detention. Following his sentence he returned to the United States and settled in Chicago.

== Notes ==
New Zealand Parliament
Preceded by Norman Kirk	Member of Parliament for Sydenham; 1974–1984	Succeeded by Jim Anderton
