= Tom O'Donnell (physician) =

New Zealand medical doctor and academic

Tom O'Donnell CBE
- Born: Thomas Vianney O'Donnell; 23 July 1926; Wellington, New Zealand
- Died: 25 December 2014 (aged 88); Porirua, New Zealand
- Resting place: Mākara Cemetery
- Education: University of Otago
- Known for: Asthma research
- Spouse: Mary Jean Lynch (m. 1959)
- Children: Four
- Scientific career
- Fields: Medicine
- Workplaces: University of Otago
- Thesis: Postural hypotension with special reference to the postural hypotension induced by hexamethonium bromide (1959)

Thomas Vianney O'Donnell CBE (23 July 1926 – 25 December 2014) was a New Zealand medical doctor and academic.

== Early life and family ==
O'Donnell was born in Wellington in 1926, the only son of Scottish-born Annie (née Welsh) and Irish-born Patrick Joseph O'Donnell, a railway clerk. The O'Donnell family moved to Hunterville in 1938 when Patrick was appointed stationmaster there, and the following year Thomas was sent to board at Sacred Heart College, Auckland, situated in Ponsonby at that time. In 1943, he began medical studies at the University of Otago, graduating Bachelor of Medical Science in 1947 and MB ChB in 1950. While carrying out research in San Francisco in 1959 he met and married Mary Jean Lynch. The couple went on to have three daughters and one son.

== Medical and academic career ==
After working as a house surgeon and registrar at Dunedin Hospital between 1950 and 1953, O'Donnell was a medical research officer at the University of Otago from 1954 to 1955. Awarded a Nuffield Fellowship in medicine, he studied at the Postgraduate Medical School and Department of Respiratory Medicine at Hammersmith Hospital in London in 1956, and was a cardiology registrar there in 1957. In 1958, he was senior cardiology registrar at Middlesex Hospital and in 1959 he was a visiting cardiovascular research fellow at the University of California, San Francisco. He was awarded an MD from the University of Otago in 1959; his thesis was entitled Postural hypotension with special reference to the postural hypotension induced by hexamethonium bromide.

In 1960, O'Donnell returned to Dunedin with his wife and took up a lectureship in the Department of Medicine at the University of Otago. He became an associate professor in 1966 and a professor in 1970. In 1973, he was appointed foundation chair of medicine and consultant physician at the Wellington School of Medicine, roles that he held until 1986. From 1986 to 1992, he was dean of the Wellington School of Medicine.

On 27 August 1974, O'Donnell examined Norman Kirk, and found that the prime minister had an enlarged heart weakened by embolisms, a lung that was two-thirds incapacitated by the clot, and a very sore stomach as his liver was swollen with retained fluid. He persuaded Kirk to enter the Home of Compassion Hospital in Island Bay, Wellington the following day. Kirk died on 31 August, and O'Donnell signed his death certificate.

O'Donnell's research interests were wide-ranging and included the health issues faced by workers in the aluminium industry, clinical trials of asthma treatments, fungal species found in the homes of asthma sufferers, and a survey of New Zealand asthma deaths. He served as president of the New Zealand Asthma Society and New Zealand president of the Thoracic Institute. He was also master of the Catholic Doctors' Guild, patron of Pregnancy Counselling Services and chair of the Wellington Catholic Homes Trust. Outside of medicine, he served on the Board of Censors.

== Death ==
O'Donnell died at Kenepuru Hospital, Porirua, on 25 December 2014, and was buried at Mākara Cemetery. His wife, Mary Jean O'Donnell died in 2023.

== Honours ==
O'Donnell was made a Fellow of the Royal Australasian College of Physicians in 1963, and elected a Fellow of the Royal College of Physicians in 1972. In the 1989 Queen's Birthday Honours, he was appointed a Commander of the Order of the British Empire, for services to medicine.
