= 1974 Sydenham by-election =

New Zealand by-election

- 2 November 1974
- Turnout: 10,600 (51.88%)

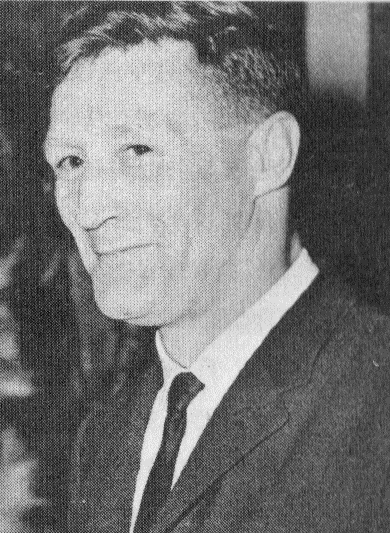
Candidate	John Kirk	Joe Pounsford
Party	Labour	Social Credit
Popular vote	6,664	1,778
Percentage	62.9%	16.8%
Member before election
Norman Kirk
Labour
Elected Member
John Kirk
Labour

The Sydenham by-election 1974 was a by-election held in the Sydenham electorate during the term of the 37th New Zealand Parliament on 2 November 1974. Eight candidates stood in total.

== Background ==
The by-election was caused by the death of incumbent MP Norman Kirk of the Labour Party, who at the time was Prime Minister, on 31 August 1974. Sydenham was an electorate in Christchurch and was a safe Labour seat, the party having held it since its recreation in 1946. Media stating at the time "At any general election in Sydenham the only interest is in the size of the Labour Party candidate's majority." This was New Zealand's first parliamentary election with a voting age of 18 years.

== Candidates ==
Labour

Bill Rowling, who had replaced Kirk as Prime Minister, was given the option by Labour of replacing Kirk in Sydenham but chose to remain in his home electorate of Tasman despite it being a more marginal electorate. He felt too much affinity for Tasman to leave and also did not want to cause a second by-election there should he be successful. His declination left the field open and several candidates emerged. They included:

- Veronica Alexander, vice-chair of the Sydenham Labour Party and teacher at the Christchurch Technical Institute
- Gordon Batt, a schoolteacher from Hamilton
- David Brine, a Labour candidate for the Christchurch City Council in 1971
- Alex Clark, a member of the Canterbury Hospital Board and Labour candidate for Rakaia in 1972
- Mollie Clark, a Christchurch City Councillor and candidate for Papanui in 1972
- Alan Charles Eyles, an agricultural scientist and candidate for the North Canterbury Catchment Board
- Brian Griffiths, a postmaster from Clinton who was Labour candidate for Otago Central in 1966 and 1969
- John Kirk, secretary of the Napier Hotel Workers' Union – son of Norman Kirk
- Bill Massey, a company director and Christchurch City Councillor
- Te Rino Tirikatene, Labour candidate for Rangiora in 1963 and 1966 – brother of Whetu Tirikatene-Sullivan
- John Wybrow, general secretary of the Labour Party

Wybrow was initially the heavy favourite to win the nomination, so much so that he withdrew his place as a candidate on the Labour ticket for the Wellington City Council at the 1974 local elections. The secretary of the Sydenham branch, Michael O'Neill, was initially a candidate as well but withdrew from the process prior to the selection meeting. The selection meeting was held on 3 October and each of the 11 candidates gave a 10 minute speech before the six-person selection committee withdrew at 9:30 to consider the candidates. At 11:15 the party president Charles Bennett announced that Kirk had been selected as the candidate. Initially the three Labour electorate representatives wanted Kirk while the three head office nominees wanted Wybrow. Gerald O'Brien, the party vice-president who was on the panel to choose the Labour candidate, broke the deadlock and switched his vote to Kirk, who got the nod. Before his death Norman Kirk had talked to cabinet minister Warren Freer very frankly about his family, and made it quite clear that if any of his sons wished to have a political career, he hoped it would be Robert or Philip, but not John.

National

The National Party decided not to stand a candidate. This followed on from a decision by National to refrain from political activities in the wake of Kirk's death. However, a previous National candidate, Saul Goldsmith from Wellington, stood as an Independent National candidate. As Goldsmith had gone directly against the decision of the party's dominion executive, party president George Chapman recommended the suspension of his membership. After discussions with the Canterbury-Westland division of the party it was felt that it was no longer necessary to suspend Goldsmith and that public announcements that he was neither an official candidate nor party endorsed had made the party's stance clear to the public. Prior to the decision not to contest the seat John Burn, a Citizens' Association candidate for the North Ward of the Christchurch City Council at the upcoming local-body election, was rumoured to be a potential National candidate. He had contested the seat in 1972.

Social Credit

The Social Credit Party chose Joe Pounsford as its candidate. Pounsford was a sub-branch secretary and executive member of the Canterbury branch of the Meat Workers' Union and had contested Sydenham for Social Credit four times previously (in 1960, 1963, 1966 and 1969) before standing in Lyttelton in 1972. During his campaign he challenged National leader Robert Muldoon to "face up or shut up" by challenging him to a public debate on industrial relations in response to anti-union remarks Muldoon had been making since becoming National leader in July.

Values

The Values Party selected Andy Lea, a 26 year old wine and spirit merchant for Quill Morris, as their candidate. Lea ran two campaigns at once as he was also a Values candidate for the North Ward of the Christchurch City Council at the upcoming local-body elections.

== Results ==
The by-election was won by John Kirk, Norman Kirk's son. This was John Kirk's entry into Parliament and he would hold the Sydenham electorate for ten years. John Kirk received 63% of the vote; Joe Poundsford of the Social Credit Party came second with 17%.

The table below contains the election results:

1974 Sydenham by-election
Party	Candidate	Votes	%	±%
Labour	John Kirk	6,664	62.86	
Social Credit	Joe Poundsford	1,778	16.77	
Values	Andy Lea	685	6.46	
Independent National	Saul Goldsmith	684	6.45	
Independent	David Crawford	321	3.02	
Christian Independent	Tom Fouhy	274	2.58	
Socialist Action	Kay Goodger	181	1.70	
Liberal	David Mitchell	13	0.12	
Informal votes		101	0.95	
Majority		4,886	46.09	
Turnout		10,600	51.88	−37.69
Registered electors		20,428		
Labour hold		Swing		
