= Sydenham (New Zealand electorate) =

Sydenham was a New Zealand parliamentary electorate, from 1881 to 1890 and again from 1946 to 1996. It had notable politicians representing it like Mabel Howard (the first female cabinet minister in New Zealand), Norman Kirk (who became Prime Minister while holding Sydenham) and Jim Anderton (a former Father of the House, who started his parliamentary career in Sydenham).

== Population centres ==
The previous electoral redistribution was undertaken in 1875 for the 1875–1876 election. In the six years since, New Zealand's European population had increased by 65%. In the 1881 electoral redistribution, the House of Representatives increased the number of European representatives to 91 (up from 84 since the 1875–76 election). The number of Māori electorates was held at four. The House further decided that electorates should not have more than one representative, which led to 35 new electorates being formed, including Sydenham, and two electorates that had previously been abolished to be recreated. This necessitated a major disruption to existing boundaries.

The 1941 New Zealand census had been postponed due to World War II, so the 1946 electoral redistribution had to take ten years of population growth and movements into account. The North Island gained a further two electorates from the South Island due to faster population growth. The abolition of the country quota through the Electoral Amendment Act, 1945 reduced the number and increased the size of rural electorates. None of the existing electorates remained unchanged, 27 electorates were abolished, 19 electorates were created for the first time, and eight former electorates were re-established, including Sydenham.

This suburban electorate is in the southern suburbs of Christchurch including Sydenham.

== History ==
The electorate existed from 1881 to 1890 and then from the 1946 election to the 1996 election, the first mixed-member proportional (MMP) election.

The first MP for Sydenham was William White from 1881 to 1886. He resigned upon receiving medical advice.

From 1886 to 1890, it was represented by Richard Molesworth Taylor.

From 1946 to 1996, the electorate was always left leaning. In 1946, Mabel Howard was elected. She held the electorate until 1969, when the Labour Party introduced rules that forced her to retire. In 1947 she became New Zealand's first woman cabinet minister when she was made Minister of Health and Minister in charge of Child Welfare. She is remembered for waving two large pairs of bloomers in parliament in support of her successful campaign to have clothing sizes standardised.

Howard was succeeded by Norman Kirk, who in 1969 shifted from the Lyttelton electorate to the safer Labour electorate of Sydenham. During his representation of Sydenham, he became Prime Minister. He died in office on 31 August 1974.

John Kirk succeeded his father in a 1974 by-election. Kirk Jr. held the electorate for ten years until 1984. In July 1983, John Kirk announced that he would not seek the Labour Party's nomination for Sydenham in the 1984 election. In his place Labour selected Jim Anderton, the party president, whereupon Kirk (a strong David Lange supporter) declared that he would stand against the official Labour candidate as an independent. His continuing opposition to Anderton's selection resulted in the Labour Party's New Zealand Council suspending him from membership of the Labour Party. Kirk served out the remainder of his parliamentary career as an independent MP. John Kirk left New Zealand in 1984 while still an MP for Sydenham, as he owed more than $280,000. He was arrested in the US and imprisoned, and then extradited to New Zealand, where he was charged under the Insolvency Act 1985. He was sentenced to four months' periodic detention.

Anderton was successful in Sydenham in 1969 and started his long parliamentary career. He held the seat until the abolition of the electorate in 1996 then transferring to Wigram, and from 29 April 2009 until his retirement at the 2011 election he was Father of the House. While holding Sydenham, Anderton defected from the Labour Party to found the NewLabour Party in 1989, and was re-elected in the electorate in 1990. In 1991, NewLabour and several other parties formed the Alliance, a broad left-wing coalition. Anderton was elected for the Alliance in 1993.

Sydenham was abolished in 1996 and replaced by the Wigram electorate.

=== Members of Parliament ===
Key

Independent Labour NewLabour Alliance

Election	Winner
1881 election	William White
1884 election	William White
1886 by-election	Richard Taylor
1887 election	Richard Taylor
(electorate abolished 1890–1946)
1946 election	Mabel Howard
1949 election	Mabel Howard
1951 election	Mabel Howard
1954 election	Mabel Howard
1957 election	Mabel Howard
1960 election	Mabel Howard
1963 election	Mabel Howard
1966 election	Mabel Howard
1969 election	Norman Kirk
1972 election	Norman Kirk
1974 by-election	John Kirk^{1}
1975 election	John Kirk^{1}
1978 election	John Kirk^{1}
1981 election	John Kirk^{1}
1984 election	Jim Anderton^{2}
1987 election	Jim Anderton^{2}
1990 election	Jim Anderton^{2}
1993 election	Jim Anderton^{2}
(Electorate abolished in 1996; see Wigram)

^{1} John Kirk became an independent in 1983.
^{2} Jim Anderton defected to New Labour in 1989, and co-founded the Alliance in 1991.

== Election results ==
=== 1993 election ===
1993 general election: Sydenham
Party	Candidate	Votes	%	±%
Alliance	Jim Anderton	12,466	57.73	+9.35
Labour	Greg Coyle	4,990	23.11	
National	Gerry Brownlee	3,209	14.86	
NZ First	Nicci Bergman	386	1.78	
Christian Heritage	Martha Alberts	346	1.60	
McGillicuddy Serious	Mark Dunick	110	0.50	
Natural Law	Carolyn Drake	62	0.28	
Dominion Workers	Clifford Mundy	12	0.05	−0.01
Economic Euthenics	Michael "Tubby" Hansen	10	0.04	−0.14
Majority		7,476	34.62	+14.87
Turnout		21,591	86.12	+0.56
Registered electors		25,069		

=== 1990 election ===
1990 general election: Sydenham
Party	Candidate	Votes	%	±%
NewLabour	Jim Anderton	9,821	48.38	−15.42
Labour	Linda Constable	5,812	28.63	
National	Judith Harrington	4,369	21.52	−8.73
Democrats	John Ring	134	0.66	
McGillicuddy Serious	Wayne Graves	112	0.55	
Economic Euthenics	Michael "Tubby" Hansen	37	0.18	−0.29
Dominion Workers	Clifford Mundy	13	0.06	−0.06
Majority		4,009	19.75	−13.79
Turnout		20,298	85.56	+1.08
Registered electors		23,722		

=== 1987 election ===
1987 general election: Sydenham
Party	Candidate	Votes	%	±%
Labour	Jim Anderton	12,241	63.80	+8.45
National	Judith Harrington	5,805	30.25	
Democrats	Neville Minchington	794	4.13	
NZ Party	Ross Holliday	124	0.64	
Wizard Party	Patrick J. Wilkins	107	0.55	
Economic Euthenics	Michael "Tubby" Hansen	91	0.47	+0.26
Dominion Workers	Clifford Mundy	24	0.12	
Majority		6,436	33.54	−0.52
Turnout		19,186	84.48	−7.29
Registered electors		22,709		

=== 1984 election ===
1984 general election: Sydenham
Party	Candidate	Votes	%	±%
Labour	Jim Anderton	11,789	55.35	
National	Pat Bonisch	4,534	21.29	
Social Credit	Richard Bach	2,461	11.55	−12.36
NZ Party	Alan Blackadder	2,324	10.91	
Values	Peter Scholes	142	0.66	
Economic Euthenics	Michael "Tubby" Hansen	46	0.21	−0.77
Majority		7,255	34.06	
Turnout		21,296	91.77	+4.88
Registered electors		23,205		

=== 1981 election ===
1981 general election: Sydenham
Party	Candidate	Votes	%	±%
Labour	John Kirk	10,232	52.76	−6.43
Social Credit	Richard Bach	4,638	23.91	
National	Warwick Sykes	4,330	22.32	
Economic Euthenics	Michael "Tubby" Hansen	191	0.98	+0.93
Majority		5,594	28.84	−7.43
Turnout		19,391	86.89	+23.82
Registered electors		22,315		

=== 1978 election ===
1978 general election: Sydenham
Party	Candidate	Votes	%	±%
Labour	John Kirk	11,487	59.19	+5.01
National	Ian Wilson	4,807	24.77	
Social Credit	Terry Heffernan	2,463	12.69	
Values	Andy Lea	610	3.14	−3.87
Socialist Unity	Robin Black	27	0.13	
Economic Euthenics	Michael "Tubby" Hansen	11	0.05	−0.14
Majority		7,040	36.27	+15.77
Turnout		19,405	63.07	16.12
Registered electors		30,764		

=== 1975 election ===
1975 general election: Sydenham
Party	Candidate	Votes	%	±%
Labour	John Kirk	10,086	54.18	−8.68
National	Paul Matheson	6,269	33.68	
Values	Andy Lea	1,306	7.01	+0.55
Social Credit	Joe Pounsford	898	4.82	−11.95
Pensioners' Party	Michael "Tubby" Hansen	36	0.19	
Socialist Unity	Ron O'Brien	18	0.09	
Majority		3,817	20.50	−25.59
Turnout		18,613	79.19	+27.3
Registered electors		23,503		

=== 1974 by-election ===
1974 Sydenham by-election
Party	Candidate	Votes	%	±%
Labour	John Kirk	6,664	62.86	
Social Credit	Joe Poundsford	1,778	16.77	
Values	Andy Lea	685	6.46	
Independent National	Saul Goldsmith	684	6.45	
Independent	David Crawford	321	3.02	
Christian Independent	Tom Fouhy	274	2.58	
Socialist Action	Kay Goodger	181	1.70	
Liberal	David Mitchell	13	0.12	
Informal votes		101	0.95	
Majority		4,886	46.09	
Turnout		10,600	51.88	−37.69
Registered electors		20,428		
Labour hold		Swing		

=== 1972 election ===
1972 general election: Sydenham
Party	Candidate	Votes	%	±%
Labour	Norman Kirk	11,711	67.45	+3.90
National	John Burn	4,722	27.19	
Social Credit	Alan Easterbrook	758	4.36	
Independent	Michael "Tubby" Hansen	67	0.38	−0.28
New Democratic	John Bernard Elliot	62	0.35	
Independent	Michael Leeman-Smith	42	0.24	
Majority		6,989	40.25	+4.04
Turnout		17,362	89.57	+2.92
Registered electors		19,382		

=== 1969 election ===
1969 general election: Sydenham
Party	Candidate	Votes	%	±%
Labour	Norman Kirk	10,575	63.55	
National	Peter Morrisey	4,549	27.33	
Social Credit	Joe Pounsford	1,285	7.72	−9.67
Independent	Ian Andrew More	121	0.72	
Independent	Michael "Tubby" Hansen	110	0.66	
Majority		6,026	36.21	
Turnout		16,640	86.65	+3.95
Registered electors		19,203		

=== 1966 election ===
1966 general election: Sydenham
Party	Candidate	Votes	%	±%
Labour	Mabel Howard	8,071	53.34	−8.25
National	Helen Garrett	4,124	27.25	
Social Credit	Joe Pounsford	2,631	17.39	+6.46
Independent	Tommy Armstrong	303	2.00	
Majority		3,947	26.08	−8.04
Turnout		15,129	82.70	−3.05
Registered electors		18,293		

=== 1963 election ===
1963 general election: Sydenham
Party	Candidate	Votes	%	±%
Labour	Mabel Howard	9,745	61.59	−1.07
National	Derek Quigley	4,346	27.46	−1.17
Social Credit	Joe Pounsford	1,730	10.93	+2.24
Majority		5,399	34.12	+0.10
Turnout		15,821	85.75	−0.90
Registered electors		18,450		

=== 1960 election ===
1960 general election: Sydenham
Party	Candidate	Votes	%	±%
Labour	Mabel Howard	8,827	62.66	−6.17
National	Derek Quigley	4,034	28.63	
Social Credit	Joe Pounsford	1,225	8.69	
Majority		4,793	34.02	−9.45
Turnout		14,086	86.65	−3.90
Registered electors		16,255		

=== 1957 election ===
1957 general election: Sydenham
Party	Candidate	Votes	%	±%
Labour	Mabel Howard	10,213	68.83	+7.10
National	Oliver G. Moody	3,763	25.36	
Social Credit	George Lynne	860	5.79	−11.52
Majority		6,450	43.47	+2.72
Turnout		14,836	90.55	+2.63
Registered electors		16,384		

=== 1954 election ===
1954 general election: Sydenham
Party	Candidate	Votes	%	±%
Labour	Mabel Howard	8,420	61.73	−6.02
National	Alma Schumacher	2,860	20.96	
Social Credit	George Lynne	2,362	17.31	
Majority		5,560	40.75	+5.27
Turnout		13,642	87.92	+1.79
Registered electors		15,515		

=== 1951 election ===
1951 general election: Sydenham
Party	Candidate	Votes	%	±%
Labour	Mabel Howard	8,406	67.75	−4.20
National	Albert Hugh Stott	4,003	32.25	
Majority		4,403	35.48	8.42
Turnout		12,409	86.13	−3.74
Registered electors		14,407		

=== 1949 election ===
1949 general election: Sydenham
Party	Candidate	Votes	%	±%
Labour	Mabel Howard	9,246	71.95	−3.25
National	Oliver G. Moody	3,603	28.05	
Majority		5,643	43.90	−6.50
Turnout		12,849	89.87	−0.23
Registered electors		14,296		

=== 1946 election ===
1946 general election: Sydenham
Party	Candidate	Votes	%	±%
Labour	Mabel Howard	10,063	75.20	
National	Ruric Hunter	3,317	24.80	
Majority		6,746	50.40	
Turnout		13,380	90.10	
Registered electors		14,849		

=== 1887 election ===
1887 general election: Sydenham
Party	Candidate	Votes	%	±%
Independent	Richard Taylor	766	66.15	+26.80
Independent	John Crewes	392	33.85	
Majority		374	32.30	+30.50
Turnout		1,158	57.02	
Registered electors		2,031		

=== 1886 by-election ===
1886 Sydenham by-election
Party	Candidate	Votes	%	±%
Independent	Richard Molesworth Taylor	438	39.35	
Independent	John Lee Scott	418	37.56	+1.10
Independent	Samuel Paull Andrews	230	20.66	
Independent	S. G. Jolly	2	0.18	
Rejected ballots		25	2.25	
Turnout		1,113		
Majority		20	1.80	−23.53

=== 1884 election ===
1884 general election: Sydenham
Party	Candidate	Votes	%	±%
Independent	William White	776	62.68	−3.12
Independent	John Lee Scott	462	37.32	
Majority		314	25.36	−24.24
Turnout		1,238	55.29	+2.92
Registered electors		2,239		

=== 1881 election ===
1881 general election: Sydenham
Party	Candidate	Votes	%	±%
Independent	William White	662	65.81	
Independent	Charles Clark	163	16.20	
Independent	James Treadwell	111	11.03	
Independent	John Richard Andrew	70	6.96	
Majority		499	49.60	
Turnout		1,006	52.37	
Registered electors		1,921		
