= William White (New Zealand politician) =

William White MP

Member of the New Zealand Parliament for Sydenham
- In office 1881–1886

Personal details
- Born: 1848 Macclesfield, England
- Died: 19 July 1900 (aged 51–52) New Zealand
- Party: Independent
- Relations: William White Snr. (father)
- Profession: Politician, timber and coal merchant, construction contractor

William White (1848 – 19 July 1900) was a 19th-century New Zealand Member of Parliament in the Sydenham electorate, and Mayor of Sydenham.

== Early life ==
White was born in Macclesfield, England, in 1848. His parents were William White Snr. and Elizabeth. Together with his younger brother Leonard, they left England on board the William Hyde on 21 October 1851. They arrived in Lyttelton on 5 February 1852.

His working career started with the Christchurch Gas Company. He then entered into construction contracts for the Southbridge and Pleasant Point branch railways. He then entered his father's business, which he took over in 1885, as a timber and coal merchant.

== Political career ==
=== Member of Parliament ===
New Zealand Parliament
Years	Term	Electorate	Party
1881–1884	8th	Sydenham	Independent
1884–1886	9th	Sydenham	Independent

In the 1881 general election, White contested the newly created Sydenham electorate against Charles Clark, James Treadwell and J. R. Andrew. They received 662, 163, 111 and 70 votes, respectively. With a majority of 499, White was returned to Parliament.

In the 1884 general election, White and Scott contested the Sydenham electorate, receiving 776 and 462 votes. The incumbent was thus re-elected.

He resigned in March 1886 following medical advice that he ought to retire from public life for one or two years.

=== Sydenham Borough Council ===
White was a member of the Sydenham Borough Council from 1878 to 1892. In 1883–1885, he was the Mayor of Sydenham.

== Death and commemoration ==
White died in July 1900, either on the 18th or 19th. At the time, he was a resident of the Christchurch suburb of New Brighton. He was buried on 21 July 1900.

Rapaki Road in Christchurch's Port Hills was originally called Whites Road after William White Snr. His father built this road, which is these days one of the busiest recreational trails up into the Port Hills, in order to give better access to the Mount Pleasant run that he owned in partnership with Richard May Morten.

New Zealand Parliament
New constituency	Member of Parliament for Sydenham; 1881–1886	Succeeded by Richard Molesworth Taylor
Political offices
Preceded by Frank Graham	Chairman of the Lyttelton Harbour Board; 1890–1891	Succeeded by Henry William Peryman
