= Peter McCardle =

New Zealand politician

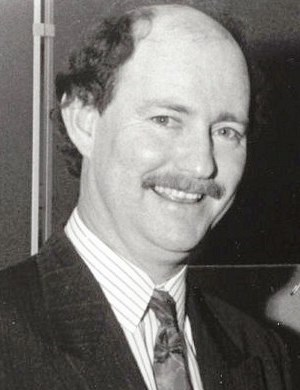
- Peter McCardle in 1992

24th Deputy Mayor of Upper Hutt
- In office 2007–2013
- Mayor: Wayne Guppy
- Preceded by: Shirley Harris
- Succeeded by: John Gwilliam

4th Minister of Consumer Affairs
- In office 31 August 1998 – 10 December 1999
- Prime Minister: Jenny Shipley
- Preceded by: Robyn McDonald
- Succeeded by: Phillida Bunkle

14th Minister of Employment
- In office 16 December 1996 – 31 August 1998
- Prime Minister: Jim Bolger; Jenny Shipley
- Preceded by: Wyatt Creech
- Succeeded by: Roger Sowry

Personal details
- Born: 28 September 1955 (age 70)

Peter Michael McCardle (born 28 September 1955) is a New Zealand politician who was a Member of Parliament from 1990 to 1999 and a member of the Upper Hutt City Council from 2001 to 2013.

McCardle was first elected to the Heretaunga electorate as a National Party candidate in 1990. He changed allegiance to the New Zealand First party in 1996 and was re-elected as a list candidate in that year's election but later broke away from that party and became an independent. He was Minister of Employment and Minister responsible for Work and Income in the Fourth National Government. During his later, twelve-year career in local government he was deputy mayor of Upper Hutt from 2007 to 2013.

== Pre-parliamentary career ==
McCardle originally worked for the New Zealand Employment Service as an employment manager.

== Member of Parliament ==
New Zealand Parliament
Years	Term	Electorate	List	Party
1990–93	43rd	Heretaunga		National
1993–96	44th	Heretaunga		National
1996	Changed allegiance to:			NZ First
1996–98	45th	List	4	NZ First
1998–99	Changed allegiance to:			Independent

McCardle was first elected to Parliament in the 1990 election as the National MP for the Heretaunga electorate, defeating the Labour MP Bill Jeffries. McCardle was re-elected in the 1993 election, defeating Labour Party candidate Heather Simpson.

McCardle was prompted to enter politics by a desire to make a significant contribution to unemployment and welfare policy. He sat on the social services committee in his first term. In his maiden statement on 6 December 1990, he named unemployment as New Zealand's biggest industry and shared details of employment policies that he had been developing for four years:

To clarify the plan, I could summarise it in this way. First, regional commissioners would be appointed under the Minister of Employment on contracts to achieve planned reductions in unemployment for a given cost by a specific date. They would also have the responsibility for administering income to the unemployed. Second, they would be allocated the resources listed earlier of all of the departments dealing with unemployment. Third, they would be required to consult regional employment committees, as was outlined earlier.

— Peter McCardle (6 December 1990). Parliamentary Debates (Hansard). New Zealand Parliament. p. 143-148.

These policies were based on the idea of workfare and the consolidation of separate government departments that dealt with welfare and unemployment. McCardle's party colleagues were unwilling to adopt these policies. He voted against his government's Social Security Amendment Bill in 1991, which proposed cuts to welfare.

Although winning re-election as a National Party candidate in 1993, McCardle decided to leave the party. In 1996, after being involved in failed discussions with Mike Moore to form a new party, McCardle chose to join New Zealand First, where he hoped to have greater influence. He duly became New Zealand First's spokesperson for Employment.

McCardle was re-elected to Parliament as a New Zealand First list MP in the 1996 election, also unsuccessfully contesting the Rimutaka seat. In the coalition government formed by National and New Zealand First, McCardle became Minister of Employment, and set about implementing some of his proposals. When the coalition began to collapse, McCardle joined the group that broke from New Zealand First to continue supporting the government. He did not retain his Employment portfolio, but was given other ministerial roles including Minister of Consumer Affairs and Associate Minister of Social Services, Work and Income (with responsibility for Work and Income). He remained an independent for the duration of the parliamentary term, but did not choose to seek re-election in 1999.

== Post-parliamentary career ==
McCardle worked for ACT New Zealand after the 1999 election as an advisor to Muriel Newman, the party's welfare spokesperson, and later as head of the ACT Parliamentary Research Unit. He left this role in 2005 to write his memoirs which were self-published in 2022.

McCardle returned to elected governance roles in 2001. In the 2001 local body elections and district health board elections McCardle was elected as a councillor on Upper Hutt City Council and a member of the Hutt Valley District Health Board. He successfully defended both roles in the 2004 and 2007 elections. He was deputy mayor of Upper Hutt from 2007 to 2013, when he stood down from the council after his fourth term to campaign against local government amalgamation in the Wellington region.

McCardle resigned from the Hutt Valley District Health Board in 2008, when he was hired as a senior advisor to the new National Party Minister of Health, Tony Ryall. McCardle and Ryall entered Parliament together in 1990. After Ryall's retirement in 2014, McCardle continued working under the successive Health Minister, Jonathan Coleman. He retired when the National government lost re-election in 2017.

McCardle was appointed to the board of Health New Zealand in July 2025.

New Zealand Parliament
Preceded by Bill Jeffries	Member of Parliament for Heretaunga; 1990–1996	Constituency abolished
