= 1971 Wellington mayoral election =

New Zealand local election

- 9 October 1971
- Turnout: 31,599 (44.30%)
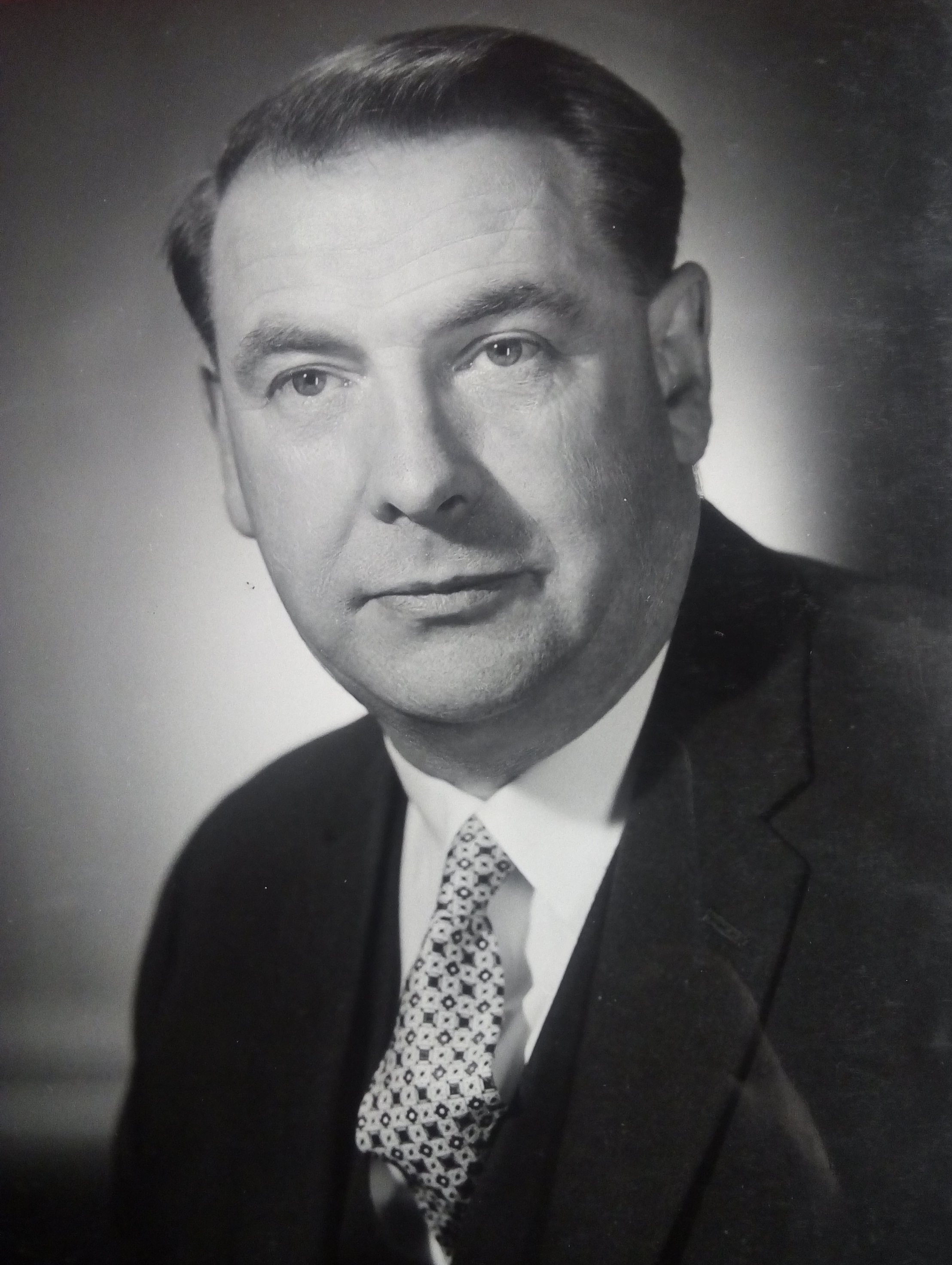

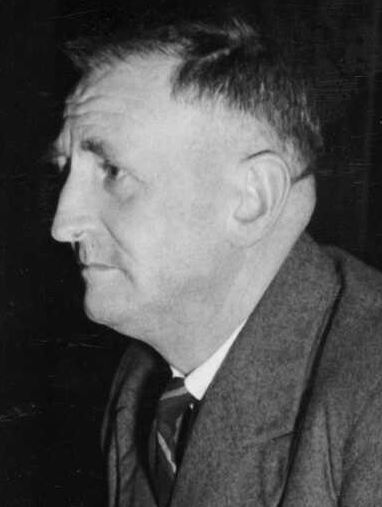
Candidate	Sir Frank Kitts	Alex O'Shea
Party	Labour	Citizens'
Popular vote	20,146	9,915
Percentage	63.75	31.37
Mayor before election
Sir Frank Kitts
Labour
Elected mayor
Sir Frank Kitts
Labour

The 1971 Wellington mayoral election was part of the New Zealand local elections held that same year. In 1971, elections were held for the Mayor of Wellington plus other local government positions including fifteen city councillors. The polling was conducted using the standard first-past-the-post electoral method.

== Background ==
The election saw incumbent Mayor Sir Frank Kitts re-elected for a record equaling sixth term as Wellington's Mayor, defeating his main opponent, former New Zealand Farmers' Union chairman Alex O'Shea. The Citizens' Association has difficulty in selecting its mayoral candidate with many speculating that it would not opt to contest the position, leading commentators to label them as "defeatist". Deputy mayor George Porter was approached to stand, but declined the nomination for "personal reasons", offering himself only for a council seat. Eventually O'Shea was chosen by the Citizens' Association executive over two other undisclosed aspirants.

The election also saw a third electoral ticket emerge "Civic Reform", who would unsuccessfully challenge the two-ticket system that had dominated Wellington's local body politics since the 1930s. Civic Reform also contested the 1974 and 1977 local elections with even less success.

The main talking point following the election was that the initial results showed that the Labour Party had won a majority on the council, the first time they had done so. However, following the counting of special votes the fifteenth highest (last successful) polling candidate, Labour's Joe Aspell, lost his seat to Citizens' candidate Ian Lawrence (a future Mayor) after a 23-vote lead became a 17-vote defeat thus leaving the state of parties at 8–7 in favour of the Citizens' Association.

== Mayoralty results ==
1971 Wellington mayoral election
Party	Candidate	Votes	%	±%
Labour	Sir Frank Kitts	20,146	63.75	−1.42
Citizens'	Alex O'Shea	9,915	31.37	
Civic Reform	Donald McMillain	1,255	3.97	
Informal votes		283	0.89	−0.02
Majority		10,231	32.37	+1.11
Turnout		31,599	44.30	−3.20

== Councillor results ==
1971 Wellington City Council election
Party	Candidate	Votes	%	±%
Labour	Rolland O'Regan	18,648	59.01	−3.54
Labour	John Jeffries	18,541	58.67	−1.31
Labour	Olive Smuts-Kennedy	17,911	56.68	+0.11
Citizens'	Stewart Duff	16,345	51.72	−4.88
Citizens'	George Porter	16,117	51.00	−8.66
Citizens'	Betty Campbell	15,564	49.25	+1.14
Labour	David Shand	14,488	45.84	
Labour	Keith Spry	14,004	44.31	−1.11
Citizens'	Michael Fowler	13,570	42.94	+1.15
Citizens'	Denis Foot	13,270	41.99	
Labour	Brian O'Brien	13,083	41.40	
Citizens'	Les Chapman	12,789	40.47	−6.66
Citizens'	Ron Button	12,603	39.88	−2.30
Labour	Warwick McKean	12,251	38.77	
Citizens'	Ian Lawrence	11,953	37.82	
Labour	Joe Aspell	11,936	37.77	
Citizens'	Fairlie Curry	11,695	37.01	
Citizens'	Reg Fyfe	11,484	36.34	
Citizens'	Nancy Horrocks	11,280	35.69	
Labour	Norm Bevan	11,269	35.66	
Citizens'	Bernard Kaiser	11,018	34.86	
Citizens'	Hollis Reed	10,894	34.47	−9.31
Labour	Pat Brockie	10,789	34.14	
Labour	Florence Vincent	10,314	32.64	−4.70
Citizens'	George Madgwick	10,687	33.82	−1.71
Labour	Yvonne Grove	9,854	31.18	−6.37
Citizens'	Peter Robertson	9,747	30.84	
Labour	Donovan Walker	9,475	29.98	
Labour	Adam Floyd	8,707	27.55	
Labour	Hannah Harwood	8,633	27.32	
Independent	Saul Goldsmith	6,050	19.14	+2.00
Civic Reform	Bill O'Brien	4,547	14.38	
Civic Reform	Don McMillain	3,829	12.11	+2.58
Independent	Donald Young	3,408	10.78	
Civic Reform	Aota Leilua	2,723	8.61	
Civic Reform	Catherine Stafford	2,720	8.60	
Civic Reform	Ron England	2,637	8.34	
Civic Reform	Don McPherson	2,214	7.00	
Civic Reform	Vao Teo	2,040	6.45	
Independent	Italo Vincent John Comis	1,886	5.96	
Civic Reform	Donald Ross	1,613	5.10	
Civic Reform	Colin Percy	1,611	5.09	
Civic Reform	Carl Edwards	1,563	4.94	
Civic Reform	Des Lena	1,519	4.80	
Civic Reform	Alan Ogden	1,380	4.36	
Civic Reform	Joseph Pratt	1,252	3.96	
Independent	Frank Moncur	1,055	3.33	
Civic Reform	John Pell	956	3.02	
Civic Reform	Rob Simmons	758	2.39	
