= Backbone club =

Ginger group in New Zealand politics

- Convener: Ron Bailey
- Secretary: Mary Bragg
- Founded: 1988
- Dissolved: 1990
- Succeeded by: ACT New Zealand
- Ideology: Neoliberalism; Libertarianism
- National affiliation: New Zealand Labour Party

The Backbone club was a ginger group within the New Zealand Labour Party in the late 1980s and early 1990s that advocated neoliberal economic policies and supported Roger Douglas in his financial reforms of New Zealand (known as Rogernomics). Its members later became the nucleus of ACT New Zealand, a neoliberal party which Douglas founded in 1994.

Ideologically, the club was a big tent that included moderates who retained their Labour Party membership after its defeat in the 1990 election, and ideologically committed right-wingers such as future ACT party leader Richard Prebble who syncretised economic libertarianism with social conservatism on issues such as Maori land rights and promoted extending privatisation to police and military services.

== History ==
In August and September 1988, members supportive of Rogernomics established a nationwide organisation of support and former chairperson of the Te Atatu LEC Mary Bragg was appointed its secretary. The organisation began as an offshoot of the efforts made to defeat Jim Anderton's bid for the party presidency at the 1988 party conference in Dunedin and made its first statement of intention on 22 September. The convener was Ron Bailey, who had been a cabinet minister during the Third Labour Government, who was questioned by the party national executive on 30 September about the Backbone club's right to exist within the party, to which he denied it was an internal party group.

After Douglas resigned finance minister he used a Backbone club rally to publicly announce his intention to challenge for the party leadership. Its members openly campaigned for Douglas in the run up to the ballot.

At the 1989 Auckland regional conference there was televised animosity between Backbone club members and affiliated union members over policy and the ordering of remits. The discontent of the event reached its apex when party president Ruth Dyson (the conference chair) went as far as to threaten to expel members of the Backbone club from the party if they did not stop making trouble. The animosity between the Backbone club and other members at the event was even to reach the point of fist fighting. Backbone club members from Auckland Central also queried the power that trade unionists had in conferences. Ahead of the 1989 national conference Richard Prebble (the MP for Auckland Central) used legal action against the party executive to challenge the voting rights of trade union members at conferences. The challenge was withdrawn after a deal was worked out between himself and Dyson by initiating a review of the party constitution including a period for branches to lodge submissions.

Leading member Dan McCaffrey was voted as candidate for Te Atatu in February 1990 but Dyson deadlocked the selection meeting and took the selection back to the party executive in Wellington and after the threat of legal action against the party he was later conformed as the candidate. The episode gave Labour appalling publicity ahead of that year's election.

After Labour was defeated at the 1990 election the club's members formed the nucleus for the Association of Consumers and Taxpayers, a pressure-group promoting Rogernomics founded in 1993 by Douglas and Derek Quigley. It would later become the political party ACT New Zealand. McCaffrey would go on to found the neo-liberal 'Better New Zealand Party' in 2018. Some club members remained active in Labour. In the lead up to the 1993 election Douglas supporter Chris Diack missed out on selection as candidate for Onehunga, despite winning the floor vote of members, to former left-wing MP for Eden, Richard Northey. After missing out on the nomination Diack and his allies in the branch drained the electorate cash accounts by lump paying more than $6000 in outstanding debts to party headquarters, leaving just $7 to fund Northey's campaign in an act of spite. Diack's supporters then took ownership of an income-earning rental house from the Onehunga Labour Party and used it to instead fund the ACT Party (to whom Diack defected to in 1994) before it finally being returned to the Labour Party after a long legal case in 2004.

Lange later noted in his memoir that he thought the club failed to achieve its goals by its decision to back Dyson against Anderton as her presence as president provided a link between the party membership and the caucus, whilst the already isolated Anderton would have been unable to do this.

== MPs associated with the club ==
- Michael Bassett
- Trevor de Cleene
- Roger Douglas
- Richard Prebble
- Ken Shirley
