= Alex O'Shea =

New Zealand union leader and politician (1902–1990)

The Honourable Alex O'Shea CMG
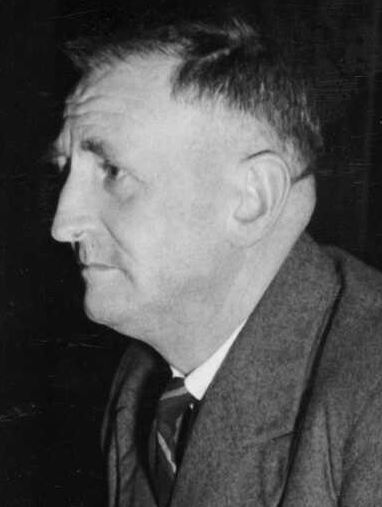
- O'Shea in 1950

Member of the New Zealand Legislative Council
- In office 22 June 1950 – 31 December 1950

Personal details
- Born: Alexander Paterson O'Shea; 29 December 1902 Dunedin, New Zealand
- Died: 24 December 1990 (aged 87)
- Spouse: Vera Cooper (m. 1935)
- Occupation: Farmer, farmers' union leader

Alexander Paterson O'Shea CMG (29 December 1902 – 24 December 1990) was a New Zealand shepherd, clerk, farmers' union leader, political lobbyist and meat industry representative. He was a member of the New Zealand Legislative Council and when he died in 1990, he had been its last male surviving member.

== Biography ==
=== Early life ===
He was born in Dunedin, New Zealand in 1902 to John O'Shea, a law clerk, and his wife, Alice Marion Clark. He attended Otago Boys' High School where he excelled and initially intended to pursue a legal career. However, in 1918 he suffered a bout of pneumonia and for a better chance of his health recovering he went to work in agriculture instead. He later moved to Wellington and in 1928 he began part-time study at Victoria University, graduating in 1936 with a Bachelor of Commerce degree.

=== Union activities ===
O'Shea became dominion secretary of the New Zealand Farmers' Union in September 1935. O'Shea immediately began a strong recruitment campaign, making regular personal visits to all the provinces, encouraging them to join and strengthen their finances. He always believed in free-trade ideals, arguing that protectionist measures and import licensing worked against New Zealand's agricultural trade. From 1964 to 1968 he took up a new position with the New Zealand Meat Producers' Board, as their marketing representative for North America. In the 1962 New Year Honours, O'Shea was appointed a Companion of the Order of St Michael and St George, in recognition of his services as general secretary of Federated Farmers of New Zealand.

=== Political involvement ===
Until 1946, O'Shea was a member of the Wellington Hospital Board. He was appointed as a member of the New Zealand Legislative Council in 1950 by Prime Minister Sidney Holland as part of the suicide squad selected by the First National Government to vote for the abolition of the council. Most of the new members (like O'Shea) were appointed on 22 June 1950, and served until 31 December 1950 when the council was abolished. In 1953, he was awarded the Queen Elizabeth II Coronation Medal.

O'Shea later became the President of the Wellington Citizens' Association, a right wing local body electoral ticket and was elected to the Wellington Hospital Board. He stood as their candidate for the Wellington Mayoralty in 1971, but lost to Labour's Frank Kitts.

== Family and death ==
O'Shea married Vera Isabell Cooper (an arts student) on 12 February 1935; they had one daughter together. He received the New Zealand 1990 Commemoration Medal, supposedly as the last surviving member of the Legislative Council (he was outlived by Ethel Gould by two years, though). He died later that year on Christmas Eve.
