= Third Labour Government of New Zealand =

Government of New Zealand, 1972–1975

Third Labour Government
- Ministries of New Zealand
- 1972–1975
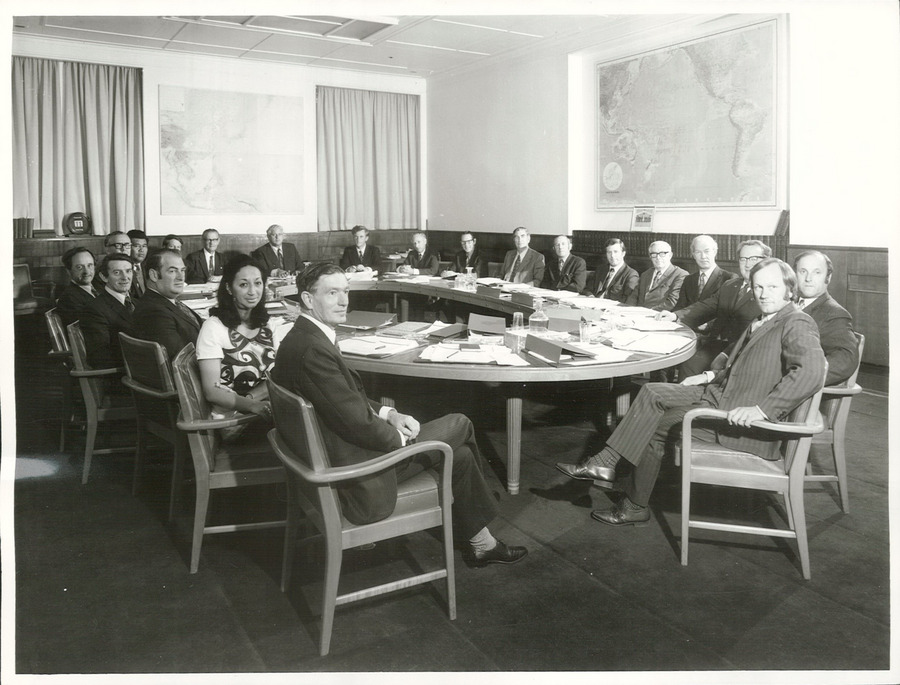
- Date formed: 8 December 1972
- Date dissolved: 12 December 1975

People and organisations
- Monarch: Elizabeth II
- Prime Minister: Norman Kirk (1972–1974); Bill Rowling (1974–1975)
- Deputy Prime Minister: Hugh Watt (1972–1974); Bob Tizard (1974–1975)
- Member party: Labour Party
- Status in legislature: Majority
- Opposition party: National Party
- Opposition leader: Jack Marshall (1972–1974); Robert Muldoon (1974–1975)

History
- Election: 1972 general election
- Predecessor: Second National Government of New Zealand
- Successor: Third National Government of New Zealand

The Third Labour Government of New Zealand was the government of New Zealand from 1972 to 1975. During its time in office, it carried out a wide range of reforms in areas such as overseas trade, farming, public works, energy generation, local government, health, the arts, sport and recreation, regional development, environmental protection, education, housing, and social welfare. Māori also benefited from revisions to the laws relating to land, together with a significant increase in a Māori and Island Affairs building programme. In addition, the government encouraged biculturalism and a sense of New Zealand identity. However, the government damaged relations between Pākehā and Pasifika New Zealanders by instituting the Dawn Raids on alleged overstayers from the Pacific Islands; the raids have been described as "the most blatantly racist attack on Pacific peoples by the New Zealand government in New Zealand’s history". The government lasted for one term before being defeated a year after the death of its popular leader, Norman Kirk.

== Significant policies ==
The government's most significant policies concerned attempts to create a distinct New Zealand identity, both internally and in the world. For most of its history, New Zealand had been, economically, culturally and politically, highly dependent on Britain. This began to change during World War II, when it became clear that Britain was no longer able to defend its former colonies in the Pacific. As Britain began to turn away from what was left of its former Empire and towards Europe, New Zealanders became less inclined to think of themselves as British. Initially the country turned instead to the United States, and so entered into the ANZUS pact with the US and Australia, and aided the U.S in the Vietnam War. However, by the early 1970s many New Zealanders felt the need for genuine national independence, a feeling strengthened when Britain joined the European Economic Community in 1973, causing serious problems for New Zealand trade. Most of this government's policies can be seen in this light.

=== Treaty of Waitangi ===
This was the first government to give serious recognition to the Treaty of Waitangi, first by making the anniversary of its signing a national public holiday, and then by establishing the Waitangi Tribunal to investigate contemporary breaches of it. Both were concessions to increasingly angry Māori protest, as was the appointment of Matiu Rata to Minister of Māori Affairs (and initially Lands). He was the first Māori Minister of Māori Affairs since the 1930s and the first ever Māori Minister of Lands.

The Treaty of Waitangi Act 1975 was the first legal recognition of the Treaty, but did not allow the Tribunal to investigate historical breaches. The New Zealand Day Act 1973, which made Waitangi Day a national public holiday, also fulfilled the Māori demand for greater acknowledgement of the Treaty. However it was also a part of the government's programme of nationalism, as the name of the day (New Zealand Day) indicates. New Zealand Day was intended to appeal to New Zealanders of all ethnicities, including those who were neither Māori nor Pākehā.

=== Economic ===
- New Zealand's economy was heavily dependent on overseas trade, and Prime Minister Norman Kirk felt that it made little sense to be dependent on foreign-owned shipping firms. A state-owned shipping line, Shipping Corporation of New Zealand was created, but was to be financially unsuccessful.
- The Development Finance Corporation bill was passed, which reconstituted the Development Finance Corporation as a wholly Government-owned body. It operated like a Development Bank in assisting with the promotion of regional development and new industrial projects.
- Wage controls instituted by the previous government were abandoned.
- The government tried to avoid inflation via massive overseas borrowing and a variety of local regulations. A scheme was introduced to fix maximum retail prices, while to keep people in employment it added the post office, the railways, milk, lamb, mutton, and wool to the number of industrial subsidies.
- Office, rail, and bulk power charges were controlled.
- During the government's first year in office, adjustments were made to the salaries of State Servants while the Stabilisation of Remuneration Regulations were introduced, which provided wider flexibility for employers and trade unions to negotiate new pay rates. These changes enabled wage and salary-earners to negotiate with their employers for a better deal, which they quickly did.
- The Development Finance Corporation was provided with powers to "grant up to 40 per cent of the capital cost of plant and machinery for projects designed to achieve a high export performance".
- New provisions were introduced to encourage employers "to finance their employees into shareholding agreements with the company".
- Subsidies and suspensory loans were introduced to encourage regional development, together with selective investment incentives "to encourage desirable changes in the pattern of industry."
- Many of the direct penalties on strikes and lock-outs were removed.
- Average real wages rose substantially, with the share of the economic "cake" accruing to labour rising from 45% in 1972/73 to 48% in 1975/76.
- In his first budget, Bill Rowling announced that state spending on housing and electricity capital works would increase, and 14% more would be spent on education and 19% more spent on health.
- Bob Tizard reduced income tax rates for many on lower incomes, and a standard tertiary bursary and additional house lending were included in the 1975 budget.
- Including benefit payments, new training, export and production incentives, and further money for health, education, housing, culture, and recreation and regional development pushed expenditure up by 19% for 1974–75.

=== Foreign affairs ===
- Recognition of the People's Republic of China.
- Opposition to French nuclear testing in the Pacific Ocean.
- Refusal to allow sporting contacts with apartheid South Africa.
- Abolished compulsory military training.

The government's foreign policy reflected its desire for independence from the powerful nations of Western Europe and North America. It was also influenced by the many left-wing movements of the period, such as environmentalism, the peace movement, and anti-racism. However, in many cases it was simply catching up to the rest of the world, much of which had already recognised the People's Republic of China and cut sporting ties with South Africa. The decision to block a proposed tour by the South African Springbok rugby team was only made once it became clear that international disapproval of the tour would seriously harm the 1974 Commonwealth Games in Christchurch. Before the 1973 election, Kirk had promised not to get involved in the sporting contacts issue. Aid to the developing world (which had virtually static for at least two decades) was also significantly increased, with official development aid increasing from 0.22% of GNP in 1972 to 0.55% of GNP by 1975. This measure was seen as characteristic of the "new morality" in foreign policy pursued by the Third Labour Government.

=== Constitutional ===
- Altered the Queen's title in New Zealand

The Royal Titles Act 1974 removed mention of the United Kingdom from the Queen's title in right of New Zealand. This was a symbolic act which made no difference in practical terms, as New Zealand's monarchy was made legally independent with the passing of the Statute of Westminster by the first Labour Government in 1947.

- Passed the Constitution Amendment Act 1973

This altered the New Zealand Constitution Act 1852 so that the New Zealand Parliament could legislate extra-territorially.

- Lowered the voting age from 20 to 18.
- An electoral amendment bill increased Māori representation.
- The Māori Affairs Amendment Act of 1974 redefined a Māori as "a person of the Maori race of New Zealand; and includes any descendant of such a Maori," thereby broadening the definition of who was a Māori.

=== Social policy ===
- Payment of the Christmas Bonus

A Christmas Bonus of an additional week's benefit was introduced for the elderly.

- Establishment of the Domestic Purposes Benefit for single parents (1973).

Single parenthood and divorce were no longer as scandalous as they once had been, and the introduction of the Domestic Purposes Benefit reflected this.

- Establishment of compulsory pension savings' scheme.

The elderly were the one group of New Zealanders not entitled to non–means-tested income support when they were unable to work. Both parties attempted to address this issue: Labour with a compulsory savings scheme and National with a scheme to be paid for out of general taxation. The superannuation scheme introduced by the Third Labour Government benefitted 750,000 workers who previously had no other form of retirement pension aside from the age benefit. Labour's scheme was short-lived, as it was abolished by the third National government and replaced with universal superannuation. Brian Gaynor estimated that the Labour scheme would be worth at least $240 billion by 2007, Sam Stubbs estimated $500 billion by 2021, and Eric Frykberg estimated it could be $1 trillion in 2025.

- The introduction of Additional Benefit (1975).

This was a means-tested statutory benefit for the elderly, which included an allowance for housing costs, an income supplement, and a special expenses item. It replaced an earlier benefit for pensioners called Supplementary Benefit. According to Brian Easton, the new Additional Benefit systematised and extended supplementary assistance.

- The introduction of the Disability Allowance (1975).

Introduced in October 1975, this was an allowance for disabled people receiving an income tested benefit or for people with an income level that enabled them to qualify for an income tested benefit. The allowance could also be paid in respect of the disabled wife or child of such a person. The aim of the allowance was to help disabled people meet special expenses resulting from their disability, such as medicines not on the free list, domestic help, special diet, or transport costs.

- An expanded welfare system.

The Third Labour government made considerable changes to New Zealand's social security system, both in terms of the adequacy of benefits and in the range of welfare benefits available. As noted by historian Keith Sinclair, "The Kirk-Rowling Government gave exceptional attention to the needs of the needs of the least privileged – often recent Pacific Island immigrants or 'solo mums'."

Substantial increases were made to social security benefits such as married couple’s benefits, single benefits, and pensions. The basic benefit was also increased and sickness benefit was liberalised: where a married couple had both been in full-time employment for at least 12 months and intended to remain members of the regular workforce, a sickness benefit would be paid for up to three months at half the rate payable to married couples, if one couple became sick. There would be no income test on this. Prior to this reform, if a husband had fallen ill while his wife was working, no Social Security payment was made. Pensions were increased and state insurance rebates were also introduced for pensioners. Fathers became entitled to the Domestic Purposes Benefit in 1973, albeit under more restrictive conditions than those applying to mothers. In addition, the Xmas bonus was subsequently repeated in 1973 and 1974, while age benefits were adjusted six times from 1972 to 1975. The real incomes of many means-tested beneficiaries were further increased by the introduction of telephone, television, and rates rebates in 1973. In 1974, aid was given to help pay the insurance premiums on the homes of pensioners, and a major effort was undertaken to increase the availability of suitable accommodation for the elderly. Increased financial assistance was also provided to voluntary groups working with handicapped or underprivileged persons, while four weeks paid relief was provided for those caring for the disabled and handicapped at home. From January 1974 onwards, approved day-care centres for children received a government grant of $4.50 per week per child. In addition, wheelchair access to buildings was promoted.

In February 1973, the maximum Advance Payment of Benefit was doubled from $400 to $800 "to be used for home maintenance or provision of essential services." In July 1974, Cabinet agreed that where special annuities were paid as though they were equivalent to a War Widows Pension or a War Pension, the cost of living adjustment granted to War Pensions would apply to these annuities as well. In December that same year, a Special Christmas payment was provided to beneficiaries.

The amount of income that income-tested beneficiaries could receive before their benefit levels were affected was also increased, while the basic dental service for children was extended to dependants up to the age of eighteen. In addition, the physiotherapy benefit was increased while a new hearing aid benefit was introduced. Altogether, the increases in welfare benefits and pensions helped narrow the gap between one-income families and welfare recipients.

Although numerous benefits such as pensions, sickness benefits, and unemployment benefits were increased Third Labour Government's time in office, it failed to increase the family benefit, which continued at a nominal rate set in 1972 by the previous National government at $3 a week per child, which led to the real value of the family benefit being reduced to the extent of $1 a week for each child. In defending the Third Labour Government's family policy record, however, Labour MPs pointed to subsidies on a variety of consumer products including gas, electricity, postal charges, wool, milk, meat, eggs, bread, and some transport items.

- Major initiatives in housing.

State intervention in housing was significantly increased during the Third Labour's Government's time in office. A Housing Corporation was set up to tackle new housing demands, whilst the mortgage and rental house management activities of the State Advances Corporation were amalgamated with the Housing Division of the Ministry of Works and Development. The new Corporation also took over the housing care of the elderly, which had formerly been the responsibility of the Department of Health, while the rural lending functions of the State Advances Corporation were transferred to the newly established Rural Banking and Finance Corporation. Advances to the Housing Corporation were significantly increased and special emphasis was given to people on low incomes. Income limits for 3% lending were increased, and fixed loan limits on urban residential loans were abolished and their terms extended. A number of houses were bought for rental purposes, income restrictions on applicants for state homes were removed, the criteria for the allocation of state houses were standardised, and annual rent reviews were introduced, "the rents to be relevant to the family income.”

The government increased the total number of houses built (especially lower-cost houses), sustained the building industry, increased government involvement in housing, and achieved stabilised property prices by the 3rd quarter of 1975. 31,000 houses completed in 1973–74, compared with 27,400 in 1972–73 and 22,400 in 1971–72. State Housing construction was also encouraged, with nearly 4,000 State Houses completed in 1975–76, compared with 700 constructed in 1972–73. The criteria for allocating State Housing was also changed, which led to more people being offered such houses. Income limits for 3% housing loans were also increased, and rent subsidies for pensioners were introduced.

New housing loans were introduced, such as a new 4.5% loan for those whose qualifying incomes were between $70 and $75 a week, plus $5 for each dependent child. An additional loan was also introduced for applicants who had a total income of less than 490 a week and were eligible to capitalise on the family benefit. Greater flexibility was extended to the State Advances Corporation "in determining the size of average loans "to be made available both at 3 and at 5 per cent." In the first budget, a special fund was announced for refinancing mortgages where people had second and third mortgage commitments that were placing strains on the family budget. Rent Appeal boards were also set up to restrict the rights of landlords to make arbitrary increases in rents to protect the rights of tenants.

New Home Ownership Accounts were introduced to encourage people on low and middle incomes to save towards housing. Savers were entitled to a tax concession of 25% if savings were retained in the account for at least three years and were then put towards the purchase or construction of a first house or apartment. A Property Speculation Tax was introduced in 1973 in an attempt to control speculative dealing in property, and in 1974 building restrictions were imposed on commercial building and the construction of larger houses. A land tax was also introduced to control profit-making on rezoned land. Improvements were made in the design and planning of State housing accommodation, with additions such as carports, driveways, tree-planting, and landscaping. In addition, an amendment to the Public Works Act provided more generous arrangements for those whose property had been taken under the Act, while other legislation ensured that a joint family home was exempted from death duties on the death of whichever spouse died first. Additional house lending was later provided in the 1975 budget. Local authorities were authorised, under the Local Government Act of 1974, "to provide housing loans and subdivide council-owned land for housing," and could also "sell or lease allotments and apply to their local authority's loans board to borrow to purchase land for subdivision."

- Major initiatives in education.

A new Standard tertiary benefit was introduced for university students, while at the secondary school level, staffing ratios were improved, an accelerated school building programme was carried out, and the number of guidance counsellors was markedly increased. Pilot schemes in "second chance" education and community education were introduced, and in May 1973 the government abolished the maximum school-leaving age of nineteen to enable adults to attend secondary schools full-time. The government also introduced "the concept of schools incorporating community facilities for use outside school hours," and tried to broaden the function of schools into community centres. In addition, sessional allowances and building subsidies for kindergartens and playcentres were significantly increased, bursaries and other grants were increased for technical institute and university students, housing allowances were granted to married male teacher trainees, and grants for hobby classes (which had been cut in 1971 as an austerity measure) were also reinstated. In 1974, amendments were made to the Education Act that established a new category of institution "Community Colleges" designed to meet continuing education needs "in provincial centres particularly."

Labour had committed itself in its 1972 election manifesto to expand community-based learning, and went about fulfilling this commitment by providing grants in its 1973 Budget for hobby classes and assisting various schools in developing second-chance education programmes for mature students. Attempts were also made to extend the teaching of Māori language and culture. Māori was introduced an optional subject in many secondary schools, proficient speakers of Māori were recruited for teacher training, Māori language lecturers were appointed in all teacher's training colleges. In tertiary education, more technical institutes were constructed, as indicated by large increase in annual gross voted expenditure on capital works for different tertiary institutions between 1972 and 1975: 25% for universities, 50% for teacher's colleges, 97% for primary and secondary schools, and 157% for technical institutes. For students in training colleges, technical institutes, and universities, were to receive $24 a week for up to three years of tertiary education, and the allowance would be increased to $27 for subsequent years if the course required more than three years. Special provision was also made for married students. In 1975, the Standard Tertiary Bursery was made available for part-time study, where the student was not otherwise employed.

Numerous measures were introduced which extended pre-school services and supported local voluntary organisations. These included the creation of ten district pre-school committees with the purpose of co-ordinating development at the local level. The subsidy for building play-centres and kindergartens was doubled and provision was made for helping in the purchase of sites. New salary scales for kindergarten teachers were approved, and assistance was extended to day-care centres, with the government providing a grant of $4.50 per week for each child cared for in an approved centre, which also qualified for a two-thirds subsidy on construction costs. In 1972, 1 in 3 children received pre-school education, while in 1975, the equivalent figure was 2 in 3.

Phil Amos, the Minister of Education from 1972 to 1975, was instrumental in establishing open-plan classrooms and was responsible for numerous measures such as the promotion of the debate on sex education in schools and the integration of Catholic schools. Amos's time in office also witnessed the opening of the first community college in Hawkes Bay, with the intention of incorporating adult and community education "on an equal footing with vocational education and set out to achieve increased representation from groups traditionally under-represented in post-school education."

- Major initiatives in health.

Attempts were made to increase grants to Hospital boards to overcome staff shortages, while specials subsidies were paid to attract doctors to rural and other medically deprived areas. Fees were paid to doctors for each patient consultation were increased and doctors were required to lower the charge made to the public. As a result of these measures, the 1973 budget witnessed a 19% rise in expenditure on health services and benefits. Reforms were carried out in the mental health service in line with recommendations made by a Commission of Inquiry in 1971, and the problem of staff shortages in mental hospitals was significantly reduced through the provision of a further thousand staff positions." The government also increased the subsidies paid to church and other voluntary organisations which wished to build or extend private hospitals attached to private homes for the elderly. Hospital waiting lists were also reduced during the government's time in office.

In 1974, various improvements were made in state medical benefits. In 1974, a higher private hospital benefit for non-surgical hospitals was introduced, together with a higher General Medical Services benefit (used for part payment towards consultations) for children. That same year, free treatment for all accident induced injuries and occupational disease was introduced. In 1974, lump-sum benefits were introduced for dependents not covered by accident compensation, and in 1975 sickness benefits for working spouses were introduced.

- Accident Compensation Amendment Act (1973).

This extended coverage to those not already covered by the 1972 Accident Compensation Act (including students, non-earners and visitors to New Zealand). Under the 1973 Act, three schemes were established, including the earners' scheme, the motor vehicle scheme, and the supplementary scheme, with covered those who weren't covered by the other two schemes (the government funded this scheme).

- A major improvement in the national minimum wage.

The national minimum wage was significantly increased, in line with a recommendation of the 1972 Royal Commission on Social Security. In 1972, the minimum wage represented 44% of the average wage, but in 1973 value of the minimum wage was raised to nearly 66% of the average wage.

- The Counties Amendment Bill No. 3 and the Municipal Corporations Amendment Bill No. 2.

These bills extended the power of Local Authorities to introduce differential rating, in response to complaints by municipalities that they did not have the power to obtain realistic contribution from high-rise or multi-unit properties. The two bills also gave Local Authorities more power in preventing alcohol consumption in streets closed for public functions, and Police were given the authority to search packages or bags carried into such closed streets.

- Measures to combat sex discrimination.

The distinction of sex in the residence rights of New Zealanders who had married foreigners was removed. Prior to this legislation, female New Zealanders were not permitted to bring their foreign spouses to reside in New Zealand as of right, due to the assumption that women should follow their husbands. The government also instructed the State Services Commission to start negotiations with the Combined State services Organisations to reach agreement on the removal of sex-based distinctions in conditions of employment.

- The Industrial Relations Act (1973).

This established the under-rate workers' permit, and enabled persons with an impairment to work in the open labour market and receive a wage that matched their productivity.

- The Māori Affairs Amendment Act (1974).

This was passed to promote biculturalism.

- The Education Amendment Bill No. 5.

This legislation gave Education Boards permission to carry out architectural and construction work on behalf of pre-school authorities, and provided for teacher representation with full voting rights on all secondary school boards. It also allowed schools to provide free continuing education so that adults would be able to attend regular day classes at schools.

- The introduction of a scheme of national walkways.

This was introduced with the intention of encouraging people to venture into the countryside.

- The Recreation and Sport Act (1973).

This piece of legislation established the Office of a Minister of Recreation and Sport and provided for the creation of a Council for Recreation and Sport. It also introduced a subsidy regime which councillors could direct towards community groups.

- Improvements in holiday entitlements (1974).

The minimum entitlements to paid holidays were extended from two to three weeks.

- The Fire Services Amendment Bill.

This considerably reduced the cost of Fire Services to local authorities (and by extension ratepayers) while raising the contribution of the insurance companies.

- Introduction of the rates rebate scheme.

This helped many people on low incomes to pay their property rates.

- The Children and Young Persons Act (1974).

This provided police and social workers with the legal authority to intervene in family situations where the child was at risk.

- Special assistance to farmers.

To help farmers, the Third Labour Government introduced a number of measures to increase assistance to farmers. A range of measures were introduced which helped to stabilise farm costs including waiving of interest on loans, the abolition of meat inspection fees, and increased fertiliser subsidies. A farm settlement scheme was also established in conjunction with a farm training scheme to get landless farmers onto their own units of land. A five-year training scheme culminating in a Trade Certification Board advanced trade certificate in farm management was introduced to make the settlement opportunities as egalitarian and expansive as possible.

- The establishment of the New Zealand Authors’ Fund.

This measure targeted government funding for the arts towards New Zealand authors and recognised the contribution made by New Zealand authors.

- The personal loans scheme.

This scheme, which began in April 1973, with interest rates ranging from just over 5% to just over 6%, increased the number and value of personal loans. For instance, by 1975, over 12,500 personal loans worth more than $7 million were on record with the Post Office Savings Bank alone.

- The promotion of preventive medicine.

Preventive measures to promote public health were pursued by the government, with the expansion of audiology clinics, the provision of subsidies for water supply and sewerage, the establishment of a public health laboratory, and the setting up of a committee to advise on noise control procedures.

- The promotion of greater productivity at work.

Greater productivity was encouraged by the introduction of a 10 cents an hour rebate on overtime and 40 cents for every shift worked.

- The Social Security Amendment Act (1973).

This substantially increased the allowable income for means test beneficiaries as of Valentine’s Day that year.

- The Rent Appeal Act (1973).

This established the concept of an “equitable rent,” and provided for the fixing of such rents for dwellinghouses. It also bestowed upon tenants the right to have their rent assessed if they believed that it was not an “equitable rent".

- Extensions in the Rest Home Subsidy Scheme.

The scheme was extended to include the Palmerston North (February 1973), Marlborough Hospital Boards (December 1973), and the Wellington Hospital Board (April 1974).

- The New Zealand Social Work Training Council.

This was established in 1973 as a way of organising and co-ordinating the training of social workers from both voluntary and government agencies.

- Larger funds for social research.

The amount of money devoted to social research was significantly increased.

- Greater allocations for geriatric hospitals and residential homes.

Subsidies for residential homes and geriatric hospitals run by religious and welfare organisations were increased considerably from 1972 to 1975.

- The extension of the provision of practice nurses to urban areas.

A subsidy of 100% of the salary costs of nurses in urban practices was made available by 1975.

- The Home Ownership Savings Act (1974).

This established special savings accounts as a means of encouraging saving for home ownership.

- The Farm Ownership Savings Act (1974).

This was passed with the intention of encouraging saving for farm ownership. It provided statutory inducements to save for farm ownership including purchase grants and tax concessions. According to one study, the Act exemplified the use of legislation "to encourage people to work towards their own betterment, and to save for a stake in the country."

- The Volunteers Employment Protection Act (1973).

This protected employees from dismissal as a result of being absent from work while undertaking any protected voluntary service.

- Introduction of new concessionary allowances.

A system began in October 1973 whereby pensioners paid only half their telephone accounts. This principle was extended in January 1975 to television license fees for income-tested beneficiaries. Income tested concessions for rail travel and local authority rates were also introduced.

- The Property Law Amendment Bill (1974).

Amongst other measures, this legislation abolished the right of a landlord to enter a property to seize property to cover rent arrears. Provision was also made for the equal sharing of the assets on the collapse of a marriage, while courts were given the right to adjudicate in arguments between neighbours over fences and trees.

- Revision of the Sale of Goods Act.

This legislation strengthened consumer rights in retail contracts.

- The Crimes Amendment Bill (1974).

This prohibited the publication of the names of people charged with crimes “until such time as they were found guilty.”

- The Land and Income Tax Amendment Act (1974) .

This legislation introduced a government-assisted profit sharing scheme.

- A more progressive tax system.

Various tax reforms were introduced to bring about greater progressivity in the tax system. New tax scales were introduced, which reduced taxes married taxpayers earning under $6,000 per annum, while New Zealanders earning over $12,000 per annum saw a slight increase in their tax burden. In addition, a new property speculation tax was introduced. According to Brian Easton, however, “the Labour Government’s reduction of taxation on low income recipients while inflation raised taxation on many earners had the effect of raising taxes on single-income families, who tend to be poorer, but perhaps lowering taxation on multiple -income families.”

- The Food Hygiene Regulations (1974).

These regulations provided for the control of hygiene in food premises and in the manufacture, preparation, package, storage, handling and sale of food. Under these Regulations, food premises must be registered, and no premises may be registered unless they comply with the requirements of the First Schedule. It is stipulated by Clause 11 of the First Schedule that food premises must be provided with an adequate supply of clear, wholesome water.

- The Criminal Justice Amendment Bill (1974).

This replaced borstal with a corrective training scheme for offenders between the ages of 15 and 20, of 3 months training or 6 months if the offence was a more serious one.

- The Local Government Act (1974).

This was an important piece of legislation relative to drinking water supplies. Amongst other provisions, it made it an offence for anyone pollute the water supply of a local authority in such a way as to make the water dangerous to health or offensive, and also allowed (but does not require) land to be purchased and waterworks erected for the purpose of providing a water supply.

- The introduction of Lump Sum Payment on Death (1975).

A lump sum grant of $1,000 was introduced in April that year, which was payable to widows or widowers upon the death of their partners. If the survivors were only partially dependent on the deceased then the payment was reduced to reflect this. A provision for payment of $500 in respect of each dependent child (to a maximum of $1,500) was also introduced.

- An extension in the eligibility for Orphans Benefit (1975).

Eligibility for this benefit was extended to provide payment for a child “whose parent previously responsible for their care and control had been a patient in a psychiatric hospital for 6 months or more and whose other parent was dead or could not be found.”

- The Disabled Persons Community Welfare Act (1975).

This provided greater provisions for those with disabilities. Under this legislation, practical assistance was given to disabled people and those looking after them, including loans for home alterations and motor vehicles.

== Formation ==
By 1972, National had been in power for twelve years, and was seen by many as tired and stale. Long-serving National Prime Minister Keith Holyoake had retired earlier in the year to be replaced by Jack Marshall. While generally respected, Marshall lacked the charisma of Labour leader Norman Kirk. Labour's election publicity focussed on Kirk, and used the slogan 'It's Time', signifying that the government had been in power for too long. Labour won 48.37% of the popular vote and 55 seats, to National's 41.5% and 32 seats.

== Defeat ==
Labour was defeated in the 1975 election, after only one term in power. In a reversal of the previous election's results, National won 47.6% of the popular vote and 55 seats, while Labour retained only 39.6% and 32 seats. Several factors contributed to the result:

=== Leadership ===
Kirk's death the year before had robbed Labour of its biggest asset. In response to Kirk's popularity, National had replaced Marshall with Robert Muldoon, a brash but popular man who could hold his own against Kirk.

Bill Rowling replaced Kirk, although the party National Executive and the Federation of Labour had preferred Hugh Watt. But Rowling lacked the charisma of either Kirk or Muldoon, and was the subject of frequent mockery from Muldoon and Bob Jones.

Watt (who was surprised at Rowling's win) declined to stand for deputy, saying he had "done his fair share" as deputy to two leaders. The party whip Ron Barclay heard that Arthur Faulkner who was known to be indecisive expected to become deputy on the first ballot. He persuaded Warren Freer (who did not want the job) to stand and split the vote so that Faulkner would be defeated by Bob Tizard or Colin Moyle; either being preferable to Faulkner. So there were five candidates, including Joe Walding who dropped out first. Then Moyle and Freer were eliminated on the second and third ballots, and on the fourth ballot Tizard won by 28 votes to 26, as one of Faulkner's supporters failed to keep their promise.

The caucus decided to have a full re-election for cabinet rather than re-electing the (Kirk) cabinet as a whole. Sixteen were re-elected plus Ron Bailey. The last vacancy was filled by Phil Amos rather than by Norman Douglas, Frank O'Flynn or Jonathan Hunt (who dropped out first), and two further ballots selected Amos over Douglas by one vote. The new cabinet agreed that Labour should "go to the country", to get a mandate for Rowling and so that several policy "millstones" could be dropped. But Rowling referred it to caucus, who (led by Mike Moore and Trevor Davey) voted against a snap election. Freer said later that Rowling "procrastinated, as usual".and by 1975 that Rowling was "incapable of vigorous leadership" There was belated talk of a "snap election" in early 1975 after the oil shock.

=== Economic factors ===
New Zealand, like most other countries, was hard hit by the 1973 oil crisis. In addition, Britain had joined the European Economic Community the same year, restricting New Zealand's agricultural exports to its biggest market. Labour seemed to lack the economic skills to handle these crises. By contrast, National's leader, Muldoon, was also its finance spokesperson, and an accountant by profession. He was able to convince many voters that he could solve New Zealand's economic problems.

Ironically, another factor in Labour's defeat was the popularity of National's universal superannuation scheme compared to Labour's compulsory savings programme. Universal superannuation, which replaced Labour's scheme, was to cause major financial headaches for subsequent governments.

=== Social factors ===
Labour's progressive social and cultural policies, which encouraged biculturalism and the growth of Māori culture, may have caused a backlash amongst working class Pākehā, who had traditionally supported Labour. The cancellation of the proposed Springbok Tour was particularly unpopular. Many disliked and distrusted what Kirk's government was doing, but found Muldoon's style and message strongly appealing. This shift, along with the appeal the government's policies had for many middle class intellectuals, helped to change the culture of both parties, in Labour's case permanently. Under Muldoon, National had much more working class support than previously or since. The third Labour government's policies attracted a large university-educated liberal contingent to Labour, transforming the party from its working class, trade union roots. This shift in party culture explains how the fourth Labour government's policies differed so dramatically from those of its predecessors. As a result of this change, Kirk was to be the second to last Labour leader (the last being Mike Moore) to come from a working class and union background rather than be university-educated.

== Election results ==
Election	Parliament	Seats	Total votes	Percentage	Gain (loss)	Seats won	Change	Majority
1972	37th	87	677,669	48.37%	+4.17%	55	+16	23
1975	38th	87	634,453	39.56%	-8.81%	32	-23	-

== Prime ministers ==
Norman Kirk was Prime Minister from the 1972 election until his death in August 1974. He was replaced by Wallace (Bill) Rowling.

Prime Ministers of the Third Labour Government

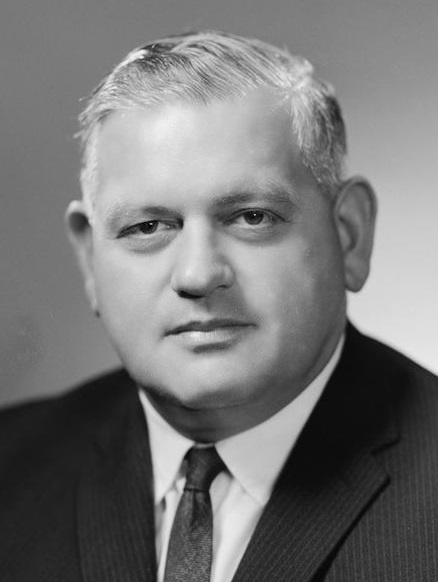
Norman Kirk
served 1972–1974

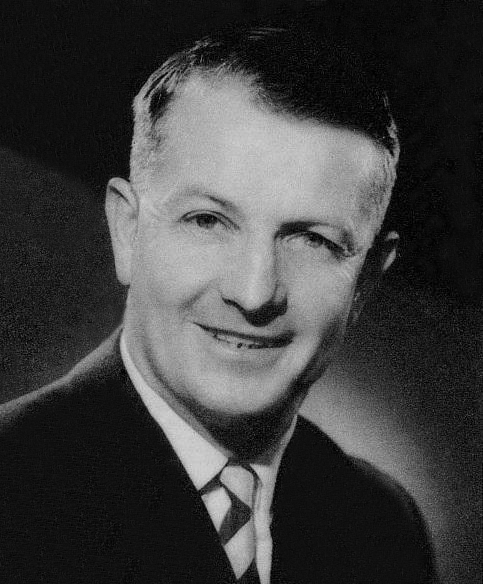
Bill Rowling
served 1974–1975

== Cabinet ministers ==
Portfolio	Minister	Start	End
Prime Minister	Norman Kirk	8 December 1972	31 August 1974
Prime Minister	Bill Rowling	6 September 1974	12 December 1975
Deputy Prime Minister	Hugh Watt	8 December 1972	10 September 1974
Deputy Prime Minister	Bob Tizard	10 September 1974	12 December 1975
Minister of Agriculture	Colin Moyle	8 December 1972	12 December 1975
Attorney-General	Martyn Finlay	8 December 1972	12 December 1975
Minister of Broadcasting	Roger Douglas	8 December 1972	12 December 1975
Minister of Civil Defence	Tom McGuigan	8 December 1972	10 September 1974
Minister of Civil Defence	Henry May	10 September 1974	12 December 1975
Minister of Customs	Mick Connelly	8 December 1972	13 March 1975
Minister of Customs	Roger Douglas	13 March 1975	12 December 1975
Minister of Defence	Arthur Faulkner	8 December 1972	10 September 1974
Minister of Defence	Bill Fraser	10 September 1974	12 December 1975
Minister of Earthquake Damage	Bill Fraser	8 December 1972	10 September 1974
Minister of Earthquake Damage	Hugh Watt	10 September 1974	12 March 1975
Minister of Earthquake Damage	Mick Connelly	12 March 1975	12 December 1975
Minister of Education	Phil Amos	8 December 1972	12 December 1975
Minister of Electricity	Tom McGuigan	8 December 1972	10 September 1974
Minister of Electricity	Ron Bailey	10 September 1974	12 December 1975
Minister for the Environment	Joe Walding	8 December 1972	10 September 1974
Minister for the Environment	Whetu Tirikatene-Sullivan	10 September 1974	12 December 1975
Minister of Finance	Bill Rowling	8 December 1972	10 September 1974
Minister of Finance	Bob Tizard	10 September 1974	12 December 1975
Minister of Foreign Affairs	Norman Kirk	8 December 1972	31 August 1974
Minister of Foreign Affairs	Bill Rowling	6 September 1974	12 December 1975
Minister of Forestry	Colin Moyle	8 December 1972	12 December 1975
Minister of Health	Bob Tizard	8 December 1972	10 September 1974
Minister of Health	Tom McGuigan	10 September 1974	12 December 1975
Minister of Housing	Bill Fraser	8 December 1972	10 September 1974
Minister of Housing	Roger Douglas	10 September 1974	12 December 1975
Minister of Immigration	Fraser Colman	8 December 1972	12 December 1975
Minister of Internal Affairs	Henry May	8 December 1972	12 December 1975
Minister of Island Territories	Phil Amos	8 December 1972	10 September 1974
Minister of Justice	Martyn Finlay	8 December 1972	12 December 1975
Minister of Labour	Hugh Watt	8 December 1972	10 September 1974
Minister of Labour	Arthur Faulkner	10 September 1974	12 December 1975
Minister of Lands	Matiu Rata	8 December 1972	12 December 1975
Minister of Local Government	Henry May	8 December 1972	12 December 1975
Minister of Maori Affairs	Matiu Rata	8 December 1972	12 December 1975
Minister of Mines	Fraser Colman	8 December 1972	12 December 1975
Minister of Overseas Trade	Joe Walding	8 December 1972	12 December 1975
Minister of Police	Mick Connelly	8 December 1972	12 December 1975
Postmaster-General	Roger Douglas	8 December 1972	10 September 1974
Postmaster-General	Fraser Colman	10 September 1974	12 December 1975
Minister of Railways	Tom McGuigan	8 December 1972	10 September 1974
Minister of Railways	Ron Bailey	10 September 1974	12 December 1975
Minister for Social Welfare	Norman King	8 December 1972	12 December 1975
Minister for Sport and Recreation	Joe Walding	8 December 1972	12 December 1975
Minister of Statistics	Mick Connelly	25 April 1975	12 December 1975
Minister of Tourism	Whetu Tirikatene-Sullivan	8 December 1972	12 December 1975
Minister of Trade and Industry	Warren Freer	8 December 1972	12 December 1975
Minister of Transport	Basil Arthur	8 December 1972	12 December 1975
Minister of Works	Hugh Watt	8 December 1972	29 August 1974
Minister of Works	Arthur Faulkner	29 August 1974	10 September 1974
Minister of Works	Hugh Watt	10 September 1974	13 March 1975
Minister of Works	Mick Connelly	13 March 1975	12 December 1975

== See also ==
- List of New Zealand governments
- New Zealand Labour Party
