= Ron Bailey (New Zealand politician) =

New Zealand politician

The Honourable Ron Bailey QSO JP
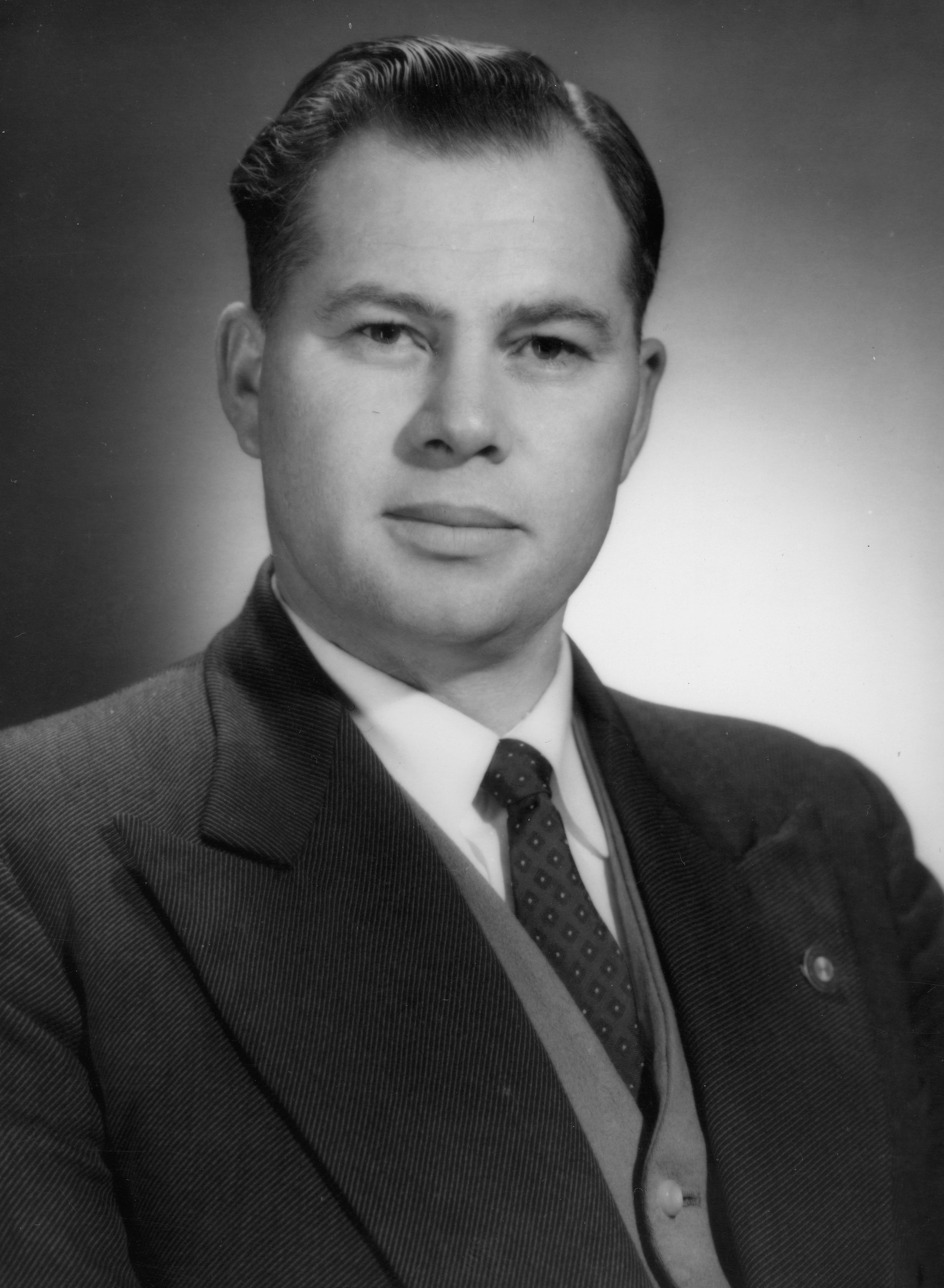

21st Minister of Railways
- In office 10 September 1974 – 12 December 1975
- Prime Minister: Bill Rowling
- Preceded by: Tom McGuigan
- Succeeded by: Colin McLachlan

8th Minister of Electricity
- In office 10 September 1974 – 12 December 1975
- Prime Minister: Bill Rowling
- Preceded by: Tom McGuigan
- Succeeded by: Eric Holland

Member of the New Zealand Parliament for Heretaunga
- In office 12 December 1960 – 28 November 1981
- Preceded by: Phil Holloway
- Succeeded by: Bill Jeffries

Personal details
- Born: 15 December 1926 Napier, New Zealand
- Died: 16 April 2015 (aged 88) Auckland, New Zealand
- Party: Labour
- Spouses: Shirley O'Neill (m. 1948; died 1977) Barbara McDonald (m. 1979–2015)
- Children: 2

Ronald Leslie Bailey QSO JP (15 December 1926 – 16 April 2015) was a New Zealand politician of the Labour Party.

== Biography ==
=== Early life and career ===
Bailey was born in Napier in 1926. He grew up in various public works camps during the Great Depression and attended four different primary schools in the central North Island. After attending four different primary schools, he received his secondary education at Wairoa District High School (now Wairoa College) and Gisborne High School. His first jobs were as a clerk and a carpenter. He became a union organiser in 1956 where he inspected living conditions in the agricultural sector. He and his union were staunch Anti-communist and allegedly he was a member of the far-right World Anti-Communist League's New Zealand chapter.

=== Political career ===
New Zealand Parliament
Years	Term	Electorate	Party
1960–1963	33rd	Heretaunga	Labour
1963–1966	34th	Heretaunga	Labour
1966–1969	35th	Heretaunga	Labour
1969–1972	36th	Heretaunga	Labour
1972–1975	37th	Heretaunga	Labour
1975–1978	38th	Heretaunga	Labour
1978–1981	39th	Heretaunga	Labour

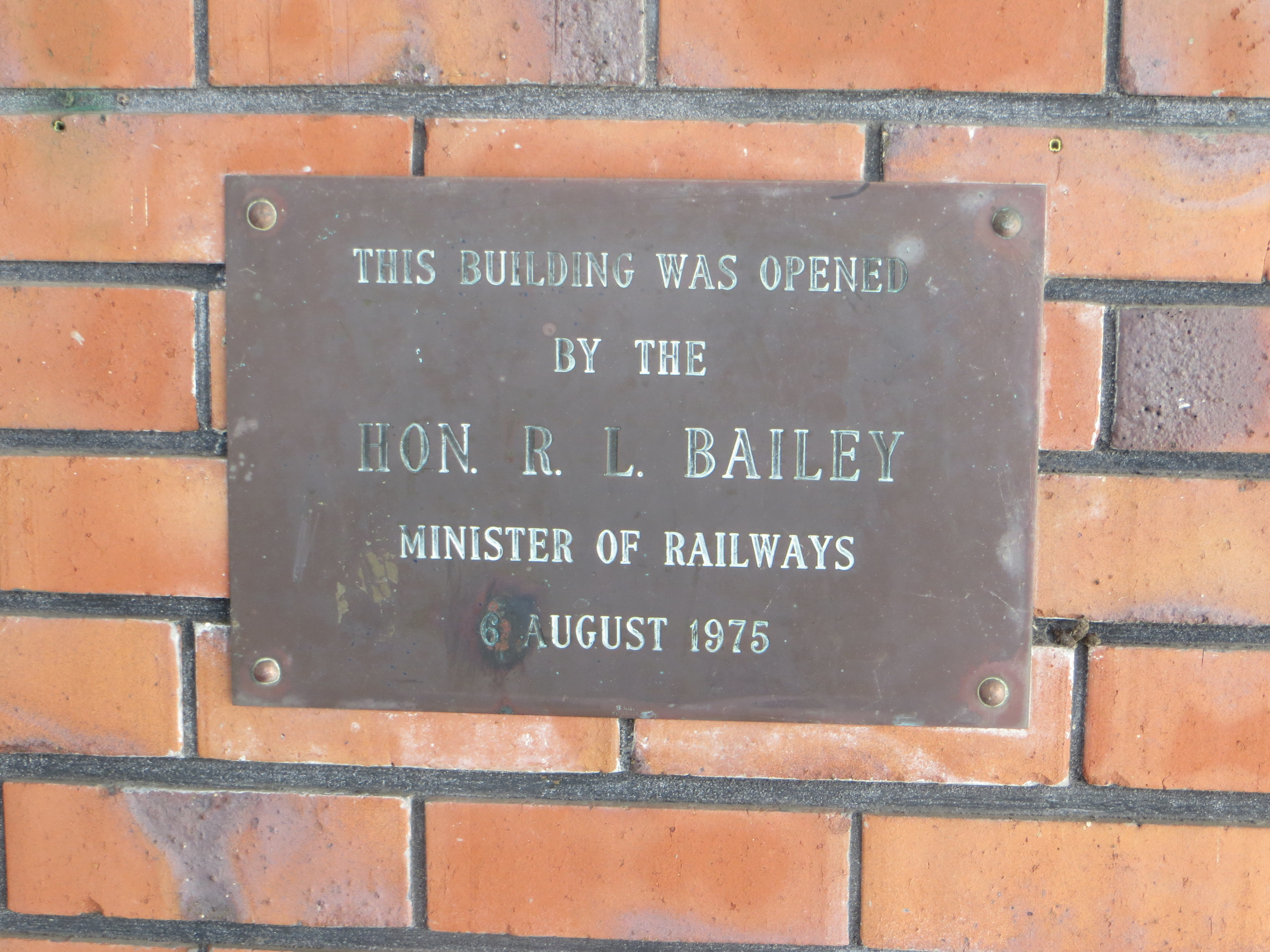
Plaque from his period as Minister of Railways at Hamilton Railway Station, Waikato

At the 1959 local body elections he was elected a member of the Wellington Hospital Board for the Upper Hutt constituency. He served for three years until 1962.

When Phil Holloway unexpectedly retired from the Heretaunga electorate, Bailey contested the Labour Party nomination for the seat which resulted in a deadlock in the selection committee between himself and Jim Bateman, a Wellington City Councillor. As a result of the deadlock the matter was referred to the party national executive. Bailey was eventually victorious for the nomination and won the seat at the subsequent election. He served seven terms and retired in 1981, when he was succeeded by Bill Jeffries. Labour spent all but one of those terms in opposition, a situation he described in his valedictory speech as a "brick wall of frustration".

During his time in Parliament Bailey was noted for lobbying for a new wing for Wellington Hospital, opposing increases in railway fares in the Hutt Valley and advocating for an increase in state house building. Bailey was Labour's junior whip from 1966 to 1972. Bailey narrowly missed out on election to cabinet following the formation of the Third Labour Government. He was tied for the final place in cabinet with Henry May (whom he had shared an office with for many years) with May narrowly winning. Prime Minister Norman Kirk regretted two friends being pitted against one another and was relieved when Bailey took the defeat graciously. He was upset though thinking he had lost his only opportunity to ever enter cabinet. Subsequently he was given the consolation job of Chairman of Committees from 16 February 1973 until 10 September 1974. As Chairman of Committees he deputised for the Speaker and notably chaired the session that saw the passing of Labour's short-lived compulsory superannuation scheme. He is also reputed to have been the only Speaker to eject National leader Robert Muldoon from the House.

When Bill Rowling was elected Prime Minister, after Kirk died suddenly, Bailey was elected to fill the vacant seat in cabinet. He was appointed as both Minister of Railways and Minister of Electricity by Rowling from 10 September 1974 to 12 December 1975, when National came to power. He remembered his time as a minister as his best in politics. As Minister of Electricity he advocated for energy conservation and empowered the New Zealand Electricity Department to promote advertising to curb power wastage to avoid building further generating plants.

In opposition after the unexpected defeat of the Third Labour Government Bailey initially retained a frontbench seat and from 1975 to 1979 he was Shadow Minister of Works and Development. In December 1979, impending retirement, he decided against standing for re-election to the Shadow Cabinet. He intended to enter local politics after leaving parliament. At the 1980 local-body elections he stood for the position of Mayor of Upper Hutt, but lost to incumbent Rex Kirton by the unexpectedly wide margin of 4,666 votes. Bailey attributed his loss to low voter turnout and local newspapers criticising his intention to do two jobs at once by remaining in parliament until the end of the term.

=== Later life and career ===
With his local-body intentions curtailed, Bailey struggled to find permanent work when he left parliament. He worked as a real estate agent for a while but found it hard to persuade people to take on high debt. For a while, he and his wife manufactured artisan chocolate at their home. He then became a review officer for the Accident Compensation Corporation (ACC) and went to retirement when he was 66.

Bailey remained politically active after exiting parliament and during the Fourth Labour Government he was the Auckland convenor of the Backbone club, a party ginger group, formed to support Roger Douglas against Jim Anderton. He remained a friend of Douglas but never went as far as to join ACT.

They later moved to Auckland and he died there on 16 April 2015, survived by his second wife.

== Honours ==
In 1977, Bailey was awarded the Queen Elizabeth II Silver Jubilee Medal. In the 1987 Queen's Birthday Honours, Bailey appointed a Companion of the Queen's Service Order for public services, and in 1990 he was awarded the New Zealand 1990 Commemoration Medal.

== Personal life ==
Bailey was married to Shirley for 29 years, when she died. They had one daughter and one son. When first elected his MP salary was so low they could not afford either a car or house. He used to travel by bicycle and the pair lived in workers' sheds alongside the Hutt River. They were only able to purchase their own home after winning a bet on horse racing.

His second wife was Barbara; she was the electorate secretary for Roger Douglas. They first met during the election campaign for the Mangere by-election in 1977. In 1979 they married, fellow Labour MP Russell Marshall (a Methodist minister) conducted the ceremony. They later moved to Auckland where they lived together until Bailey's death.

== Notes and references ==
=== References ===
- Bassett, Michael (2008). Working with David: Inside the Lange Cabinet. Auckland: Hodder Moa. ISBN 978-1-86971-094-1.
- Hayward, Margaret (1981) [First ed. published 1981]. Diary of the Kirk Years (1 ed.). Wellington: A.H. and A.W. Reed Limited. ISBN 0-589-01350-5.
- Stott, Bob; Leitch, David (1988). New Zealand Railways: The First 125 Years. Auckland: Heinemann Reed. ISBN 0-7900-0000-8.
- Wilson, Jim (1985) [First ed. published 1913]. New Zealand Parliamentary Record, 1840–1984 (4th ed.). Wellington: V.R. Ward, Govt. Printer. OCLC 154283103.

Political offices
Preceded by Tom McGuigan	Minister of Railways; 1974–1975	Succeeded by Colin McLachlan
Preceded by Tom McGuigan	Minister of Electricity; 1974–1975	Succeeded by Eric Holland
Preceded by Richard Harrison	Chairman of Committees of the House of Representatives; 1973–1974	Succeeded by Jonathan Hunt
New Zealand Parliament
Preceded by Phil Holloway	Member of Parliament for Heretaunga; 1960–1981	Succeeded by Bill Jeffries
