= Minister of Employment (New Zealand) =

New Zealand minister of the Crown

- Coat of arms of New Zealand

- Flag of New Zealand
- Incumbent; Louise Upston since 27 November 2023
- Ministry of Business, Innovation and Employment
- Style: The Honourable
- Member of: Cabinet of New Zealand; Executive Council
- Reports to: Prime Minister of New Zealand
- Appointer: Governor-General of New Zealand
- Term length: At His Majesty's pleasure
- Formation: 22 September 1931
- First holder: Gordon Coates
- Salary: $288,900
- Website: www.beehive.govt.nz

The Minister of Employment is a cabinet portfolio in New Zealand which was first established in 1931 and was in use until 1938 before being used in several separate increments. It was revived from 1946 to 1954 and was again reconstituted in 1984.

The current minister is Louise Upston.

== List of ministers ==
The following ministers have held the office of Minister of Employment.

Key

Reform United Labour National NZ First

No.	Name	Portrait	Term of Office		Prime Minister
1	Gordon Coates		22 September 1931	20 January 1933	Forbes
2	Adam Hamilton		20 January 1933	26 July 1934	Forbes
-	Alexander Young; Acting Minister		26 July 1934	8 April 1935	Forbes
3	Sydney Smith		8 April 1935	6 December 1935	Forbes
4	Tim Armstrong		6 December 1935	13 December 1938	Savage
Office not in use
5	Peter Fraser		28 March 1946	19 December 1946	Fraser
6	Angus McLagan		19 December 1946	13 December 1949	Fraser
7	Bill Sullivan		13 December 1949	31 October 1954	Holland
Office not in use
8	Kerry Burke		26 July 1984	6 April 1987	Lange
9	Phil Goff		6 April 1987	14 August 1989	Lange
9	Phil Goff		6 April 1987	14 August 1989	Palmer
10	Annette King		14 August 1989	2 November 1990	Palmer
10	Annette King		14 August 1989	2 November 1990	Moore
11	Maurice McTigue		2 November 1990	1 July 1993	Bolger
12	Denis Marshall		1 July 1993	2 March 1994	Bolger
13	Wyatt Creech		2 March 1994	16 December 1996	Bolger
14	Peter McCardle		16 December 1996	31 August 1998	Bolger
14	Peter McCardle		16 December 1996	31 August 1998	Shipley
15	Roger Sowry		31 August 1998	10 December 1999	Shipley
16	Steve Maharey		10 December 1999	19 October 2005	Clark
17	Ruth Dyson		19 October 2005	19 November 2008	Clark
18	Paula Bennett		19 November 2008	27 January 2010	Key
19	Steven Joyce		27 January 2010	20 December 2016	Key
20	Paul Goldsmith		20 December 2016	26 October 2017	English
21	Willie Jackson		26 October 2017	6 November 2020	Ardern
22	Carmel Sepuloni		6 November 2020	27 November 2023	Ardern
22	Carmel Sepuloni		6 November 2020	27 November 2023	Hipkins
