= George Porter (New Zealand politician) =

New Zealand architect and politician

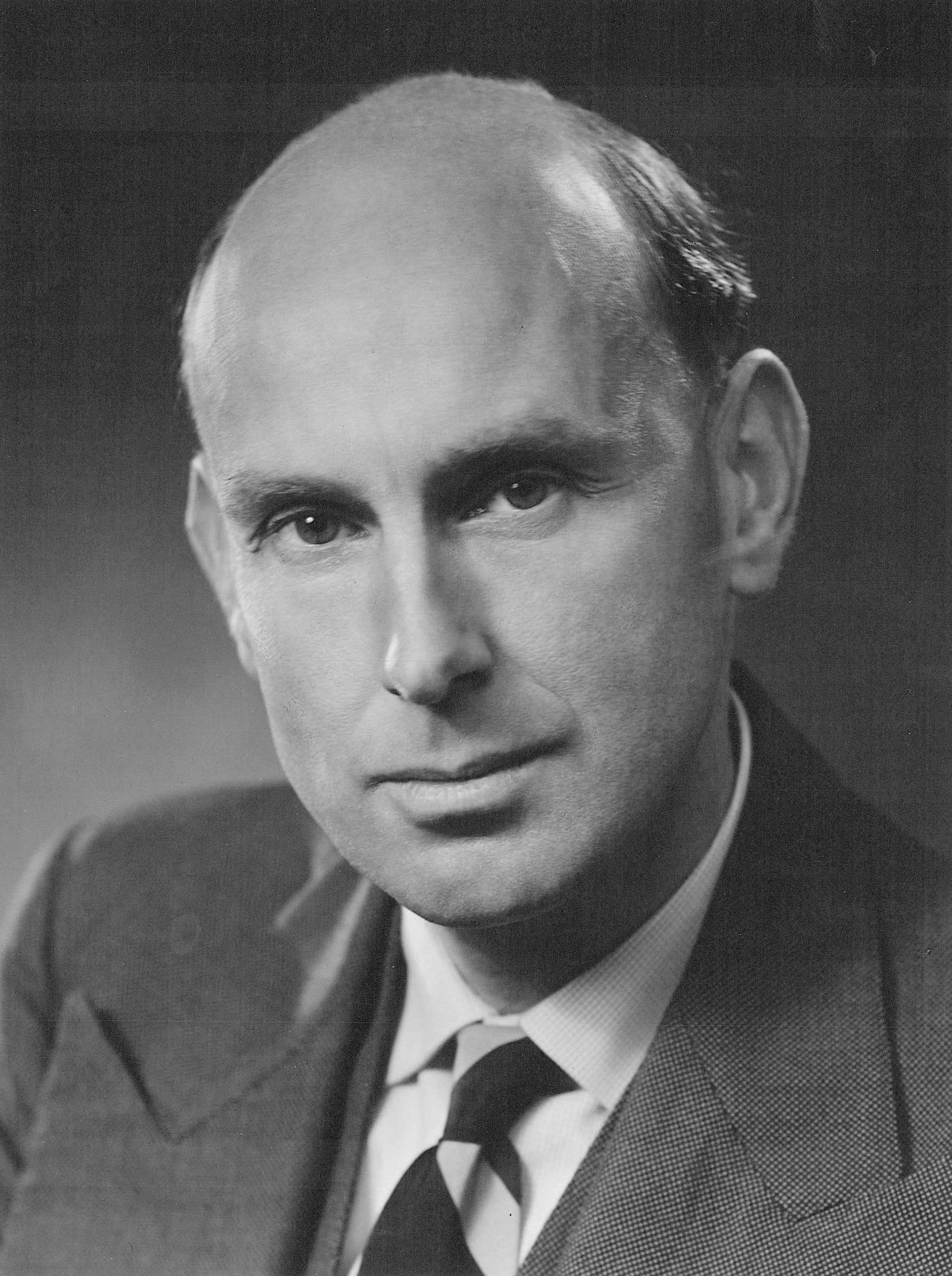

13th Deputy Mayor of Wellington
- In office 1970–1971
- Mayor: Frank Kitts
- Preceded by: Bob Archibald
- Succeeded by: John Jeffries

Member of the Wellington City Council
- In office 21 November 1959 – 12 October 1974
- Constituency: At-large

Personal details
- Born: David George Porter; 4 September 1921 Wellington, New Zealand
- Died: 25 February 1998 (aged 76) Wellington, New Zealand
- Spouse: Frances Fyfe (m. 1949)
- Children: 3
- Education: University of Auckland
- Profession: Architect

David George Porter (4 September 1921 – 25 February 1998) was a New Zealand architect, company director and politician. He was a Wellington City Councillor and Deputy-Mayor from 1970 to 1971.

== Biography ==
=== Early life ===
Porter was born on 4 September 1921 in Wellington to Ernest and Arline (née Thompson) Porter. He was educated at John McGlashan College and Wellesley College. He then attended the University of Auckland and graduated with a Bachelor of Architecture in 1944. Porter married Frances Ann Fyfe with whom he had two daughters and one son on 23 December 1949 .

=== Professional career ===
He worked as an architect for the Wellington office of the Ministry of Works from 1945 to 1948 and later as a town planner from 1948 to 1951. Together with Lew Martin, he started the architectural firm Porter & Martin working as a consultant from 1951 to 1982. He was the president of the Town and Country Planning Institute from 1959 to 1961. In 1984 he became the Director of the Pacific Institute of Resource Management (which he co-founded with Grant Bertinshaw) until he retired in 1997. He drafted the aims of the institute himself to ensure it "provides information on global, regional and national issues related to global ecology and human justice, issues critical to the future of people and the planet."

He was a co-founder in 1946 and later president of the Wellington Architectural Centre. Porter founded the centre thinking that architecture needed to fulfil wider needs than just the design of buildings, arguing that the profession needed to take a wider interest in the arts and town planning. The centre would set up its own school of architecture and planning which then built a demonstration house. The house received a mixed response. It built a model of central Wellington to show how the city's layout and design could be improved. It then promoted its 'Living in Cities' programme which challenged the then accepted standard of urban sprawl by promoting an alternative of medium-density housing. The centre showcased this alternative by holding the 'Homes Without Sprawl' exhibition.

=== Political career ===
In 1959 he won a seat on the Wellington City Council on a Citizens' Association ticket. He was motivated to stand due to concerns that the local government was neglecting to engage in properly planned development. He was chairman of the council's bylaws committee in his first term and was chairman of the housing committee from 1962 to 1974. Wellington Mayor Sir Michael Fowler later described Porter as an "extremely good" councillor.

Until 1962 the council had no committee for housing but Porter successfully argued for the creation of one and for the council to be involved with the development of housing lots for both sale and rent complemented with pensioner flats. Development began on better zoning and planning with many areas of the city combining land usage unhealthily, epitomised by the suburb of Te Aro which in the late 1950s was still a mix of factories, small business retailers among hundreds of slum-like houses. Porter put forth the view that Wellington should formalise its approach to planning by putting in place standards that would avoid any further ad-hoc development. He worked with central government to secure funding to densify housing, replacing several hundred inner-city houses with larger apartment blocks which created more than 2,000 extra housing units in the city.

Mixed with the densification were heritage-zone exceptions which led to the gentrification of suburbs that were once slums. Porter was also instrumental in the inclusion of papakainga into planning schemes to enable Māori to return to, live in, and own property on ancestral lands.

In 1970 he became deputy mayor and was approached to stand for the mayoralty in 1971, though he declined the nomination for "personal reasons", offering himself only for a council seat. By this time he had become synonymous with housing in Wellington. He retired from the council in 1974. He was also a member of the Wellington Regional Planning Authority (WRPA) and was its chairman from 1968 to 1974. When the WRPA was merged into the new Wellington Regional Council in 1980, Porter stood for election to the regional council (previously members were appointees). In a surprise result he failed to win a seat standing in the Wellington city ward.

=== Later life and death ===
He was a member of New Zealand's Environment Council until he retired in 1977.

Porter died in Wellington on 25 February 1998, aged 76, survived by his wife and children.

== Recognition and awards ==
The city council-owned George Porter Flats in Hopper Street, Te Aro were named after him. In 1976 he was awarded the Alfred O. Glasse Award by the New Zealand Planning Institute for his contribution to town planning in local government.

== Notes ==
Political offices
Preceded by Bob Archibald	Deputy Mayor of Wellington; 1970–1971	Succeeded by John Jeffries
