= Bill Jeffries =

New Zealand politician

The Honourable Bill Jeffries
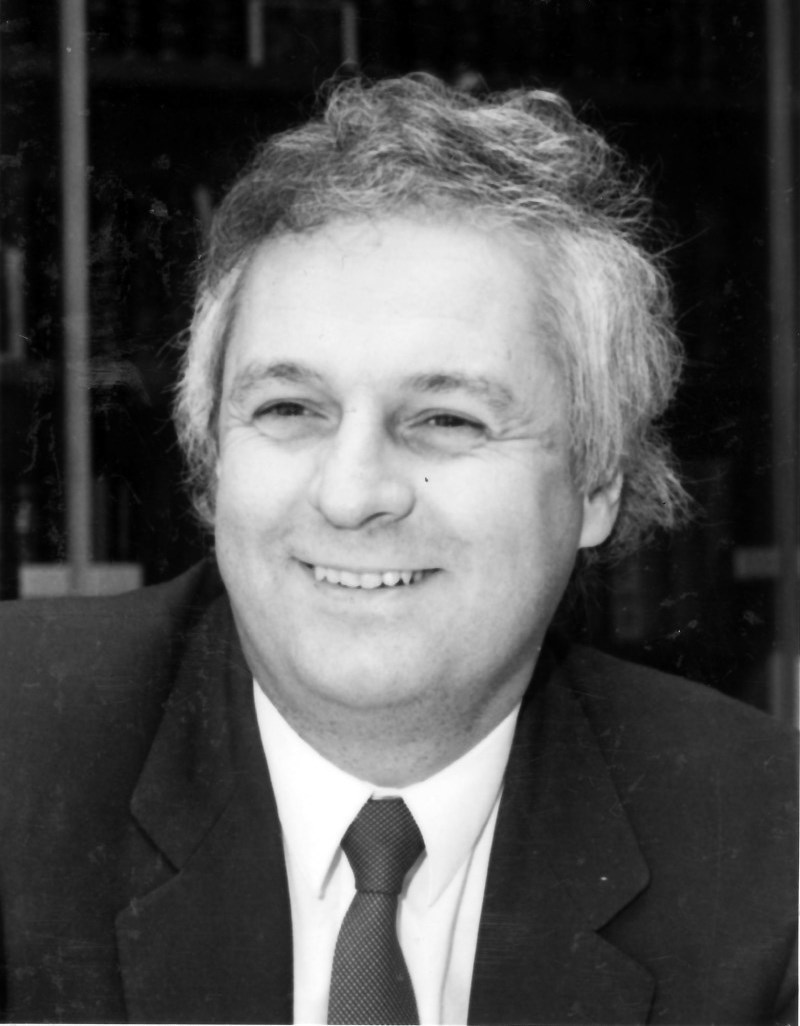

40th Minister of Justice
- In office 13 August 1989 – 2 November 1990
- Prime Minister: Geoffrey Palmer; Mike Moore
- Preceded by: Geoffrey Palmer
- Succeeded by: Doug Graham

15th Minister of Transport
- In office 24 August 1987 – 2 November 1990
- Prime Minister: David Lange; Geoffrey Palmer; Mike Moore
- Preceded by: Richard Prebble
- Succeeded by: Rob Storey

Member of the New Zealand Parliament for Heretaunga
- In office 28 November 1981 – 27 October 1990
- Preceded by: Ron Bailey
- Succeeded by: Peter McCardle

Personal details
- Born: William Patrick Jeffries; 19 September 1945 (age 81) Wellington, New Zealand
- Party: Labour
- Relations: John Jeffries (brother); Martha Jeffries (daughter)
- Profession: Lawyer

William Patrick Jeffries (born 19 September 1945) is a former New Zealand politician of the Labour Party. He was elected as the Member of Parliament for Heretaunga and served as Minister of Transport and Minister of Justice.

== Biography ==
=== Early life and career ===
Jeffries was born in Wellington in 1945 and he was educated at St Patrick's College. He attended Victoria University and graduated with a Bachelor of Laws, after which he became a lawyer at his brother's legal firm. Later he left New Zealand to work in the United Kingdom, before returning to Wellington and establishing his own law firm.

He was an active athlete in his youth, playing both tennis and rugby. Jeffries married and had six children, including filmmaker and climate communications specialist Martha Jeffries.

=== Political career ===
New Zealand Parliament
Years	Term	Electorate	List	Party
1981–1984	40th	Heretaunga		Labour
1984–1987	41st	Heretaunga		Labour
1987–1990	42nd	Heretaunga		Labour

Jeffries was a member of the Wellington City Council from 1974 until 1980. From 1977 to 1980 he was leader of the Labour caucus on the council; he was the youngest ever leader. Wellington Mayor Sir Michael Fowler later described Jeffries as an "extremely good" councillor. His brother John was previously also a councillor and Deputy Mayor to Sir Frank Kitts.

In 1978 Jeffries unsuccessfully contested the seat of Miramar for the Labour Party.

He represented the Heretaunga electorate from 1981 to 1990, when he was defeated by National candidate Peter McCardle in a swing against Labour. He was undersecretary to the Minister of Transport in 1986 and also to the Minister of Works, and chairman of a parliamentary committee on road safety in 1987. In April 1988 he was appointed chairman of the National Roads Board. He was Minister of Justice from 1989 to 1990 in the Fourth Labour Government.

In 1990, Jeffries was awarded the New Zealand 1990 Commemoration Medal.

=== Lombard Finance convictions ===
On 24 February 2012 Jeffries was convicted, along with fellow former Justice Minister Sir Douglas Graham and two other men, of breaching the Securities Act by making untrue statements to investors in his capacity as a director of Lombard Finance. Justice Robert Dobson wrote, "I am satisfied that the accused genuinely believed in the accuracy and adequacy of the ... documents", but that the offences were ones of strict liability so there was no need for "any form of mental intent to distribute documents that were false or misleading". Jeffries was sentenced to 400 hours' community service. The Court of Appeal dismissed his appeal against conviction and increased his sentence to eight months' home detention and 250 hours' community work, but the Supreme Court restored the original sentence. Retired Court of Appeal judge Sir Edmund Thomas described his convictions as a "grievous miscarriage of justice", saying of the crucial piece of evidence that "you would never ever convict a dog on the basis of the schedule".

== Notes ==
Political offices
Preceded by Geoffrey Palmer	Minister of Justice; 1989–1990	Succeeded by Doug Graham
Preceded by Richard Prebble	Minister of Transport; 1987–1990	Succeeded by Rob Storey
Preceded by Richard Prebble	Minister of Civil Aviation; 1987–1990	Succeeded by Rob Storey
New Zealand Parliament
Preceded by Ron Bailey	Member of Parliament for Heretaunga; 1981–1990	Succeeded by Peter McCardle
