= Heretaunga (electorate) =

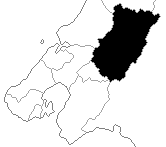
Heretaunga electorate boundaries between 1993 and 1996.

Heretaunga is a former New Zealand parliamentary electorate, in the city of Upper Hutt, that existed from 1954 until 1996.

== Population centres ==
The First Labour Government was defeated in the 1949 election and the incoming National Government changed the Electoral Act, with the electoral quota once again based on total population as opposed to qualified electors, and the tolerance was increased to 7.5% of the electoral quota. There was no adjustments in the number of electorates between the South and North Islands, but the law changes resulted in boundary adjustments to almost every electorate through the 1952 electoral redistribution; only five electorates were unaltered. Five electorates were reconstituted and the Heretaunga electorate was newly created, and a corresponding six electorates were abolished; all of these in the North Island. These changes took effect with the 1954 election.

The Heretaunga electorate was urban and was based on Heretaunga, a suburb of Upper Hutt in the northern Hutt Valley. Other places included Haywards and Birchville.

== History ==
The electorate originated in 1954, and lasted to 1996, when with the introduction of MMP it was replaced by Rimutaka.

In the 1951 election, Upper Hutt had belonged to the Otaki electorate, and the National Party's incumbent Member of Parliament, Jimmy Maher had defeated the Labour' Party's candidate, Phil Holloway. In the 1954 election, Upper Hutt belonged to the newly-formed Heretaunga electorate, and Holloway stood against National's Allan McCready (Maher's son-in-law) and won decisively.

Up to 1990 when Peter McCardle won the seat for National, the Labour Party held Heretaunga. In 1993, McCardle narrowly held the seat against a challenge from Labour candidate Heather Simpson (who went on to become Helen Clark's Chief of Staff, known as H2 – Clark was H1). Subsequently, McCardle left the National Party in 1996 and joined New Zealand First.

=== Members of Parliament ===
Key

Labour National NZ First

Election	Winner
1954 election	Phil Holloway
1957 election	Phil Holloway
1960 election	Ron Bailey
1963 election	Ron Bailey
1966 election	Ron Bailey
1969 election	Ron Bailey
1972 election	Ron Bailey
1975 election	Ron Bailey
1978 election	Ron Bailey
1981 election	Bill Jeffries
1984 election	Bill Jeffries
1987 election	Bill Jeffries
1990 election	Peter McCardle
1993 election	Peter McCardle
(Electorate abolished in 1996; see Rimutaka)

== Election results ==
=== 1993 election ===
1993 general election: Heretaunga
Party	Candidate	Votes	%	±%
National	Peter McCardle	7,981	41.15	−2.53
Labour	Heather Simpson	7,149	36.86	
Alliance	Brendan Tracey	2,663	13.73	
NZ First	Gary Logan	772	3.98	
Christian Heritage	Geoff Hounsell	616	3.17	
McGillicuddy Serious	Rick Sahar	137	0.70	
Defence Movement	Hilda Mendoza	32	0.16	
Independent	Michael Avanti	43	0.22	
Majority		832	4.29	−1.66
Turnout		19,393	86.27	−0.01
Registered electors		22,477		

=== 1990 election ===
1990 general election: Heretaunga
Party	Candidate	Votes	%	±%
National	Peter McCardle	8,234	43.68	
Labour	Bill Jeffries	7,112	37.73	−16.82
Green	S Miller	1,194	6.33	
NewLabour	Kevin Boyd	1,000	5.30	
Christian Heritage	John Allen	927	4.91	−35.76
Independent	S Cochrane	218	1.15	
Democrats	Bill Henderson	164	0.87	−3.90
Majority		1,122	5.95	
Turnout		18,849	86.28	−1.07
Registered electors		21,844		

=== 1987 election ===
1987 general election: Heretaunga
Party	Candidate	Votes	%	±%
Labour	Bill Jeffries	10,037	54.55	+2.32
National	John Allen	7,483	40.67	
Democrats	Bill Henderson	878	4.77	+1.70
Majority		2,554	13.88	−9.45
Turnout		18,398	87.35	−6.04
Registered electors		21,060		

=== 1984 election ===
1984 general election: Heretaunga
Party	Candidate	Votes	%	±%
Labour	Bill Jeffries	10,155	52.23	+4.55
National	Anna MacFarlane	5,618	28.89	
NZ Party	Derek Spence	3,072	15.80	
Social Credit	Bill Henderson	597	3.07	
Majority		4,537	23.33	+11.33
Turnout		19,442	93.39	+2.19
Registered electors		20,818		

=== 1981 election ===
1981 general election: Heretaunga
Party	Candidate	Votes	%	±%
Labour	Bill Jeffries	8,872	47.68	
National	Ronald Palmer	6,639	35.68	
Social Credit	Jim Ross	3,094	16.62	
Majority		2,233	12.00	
Turnout		18,605	91.20	−15.62
Registered electors		20,400		

=== 1978 election ===
1978 general election: Heretaunga
Party	Candidate	Votes	%	±%
Labour	Ron Bailey	9,086	49.82	+4.47
National	John Ward	6,342	34.77	
Social Credit	Shane Kelly	2,110	11.56	
Values	Mary Harpham	699	3.83	
Majority		2,744	15.04	−13.22
Turnout		18,237	75.58	−11.06
Registered electors		24,129		

=== 1975 election ===
1975 general election: Heretaunga
Party	Candidate	Votes	%	±%
Labour	Ron Bailey	8,330	45.35	−9.68
National	Julie Cameron	7,994	43.52	
Social Credit	John Fowlds	1,129	6.14	+2.01
Values	Max Overton	913	4.97	
Majority		336	1.82	−17.87
Turnout		18,366	86.64	−3.99
Registered electors		21,198		

=== 1972 election ===
1972 general election: Heretaunga
Party	Candidate	Votes	%	±%
Labour	Ron Bailey	8,281	55.03	+4.16
National	John Schnellenberg	5,317	35.33	
Values	Susan Northcote-Bade	698	4.63	
Social Credit	John Fowlds	622	4.13	
New Democratic	G W Healy	129	0.85	
Majority		2,964	19.69	+10.70
Turnout		15,047	90.63	−0.46
Registered electors		16,602		

=== 1969 election ===
1969 general election: Heretaunga
Party	Candidate	Votes	%	±%
Labour	Ron Bailey	7,773	50.87	−0.31
National	Ralph Miller	6,398	41.87	
Social Credit	Barry Charles Ritzema	930	6.08	−6.52
Independent	Grace Mary Martin	178	1.16	
Majority		1,375	8.99	−6.81
Turnout		15,279	90.17	−2.04
Registered electors		16,943		

=== 1966 election ===
1966 general election: Heretaunga
Party	Candidate	Votes	%	±%
Labour	Ron Bailey	8,572	51.18	−2.17
National	Ian Ross	5,925	35.38	
Social Credit	Barry Charles Ritzema	2,111	12.60	
Democratic	Raymond Logan Burgess	138	0.82	
Majority		2,647	15.80	+1.89
Turnout		16,746	88.13	−2.50
Registered electors		19,000		

=== 1963 election ===
1963 general election: Heretaunga
Party	Candidate	Votes	%	±%
Labour	Ron Bailey	8,186	53.35	−0.62
National	Bob Kimmins	6,051	39.43	
Social Credit	Ting Lousich	1,106	7.20	
Majority		2,135	13.91	−2.91
Turnout		15,343	90.63	−0.29
Registered electors		16,929		

=== 1960 election ===
1960 general election: Heretaunga
Party	Candidate	Votes	%	±%
Labour	Ron Bailey	8,265	53.97	
National	Vere Hampson-Tindale	5,689	37.14	
Social Credit	Anthony R. Wall	1,360	8.88	
Majority		2,576	16.82	
Turnout		15,314	90.92	−3.31
Registered electors		16,842		

=== 1957 election ===
1957 general election: Heretaunga
Party	Candidate	Votes	%	±%
Labour	Phil Holloway	9,382	64.88	+1.58
National	Allan McCready	4,265	29.49	−0.40
Social Credit	Robert Leslie Allan	812	5.61	
Majority		5,117	35.38	+1.97
Turnout		14,459	94.23	+1.97
Registered electors		15,343		

=== 1954 election ===
1954 general election: Heretaunga
Party	Candidate	Votes	%	±%
Labour	Phil Holloway	9,583	63.30	
National	Allan McCready	4,525	29.89	
Social Credit	Christopher Walter Tait	1,029	6.79	
Majority		5,058	33.41	
Turnout		15,137	92.26	
Registered electors		16,406		
