= Martha Jeffries =

New Zealand filmmaker (born 1978)

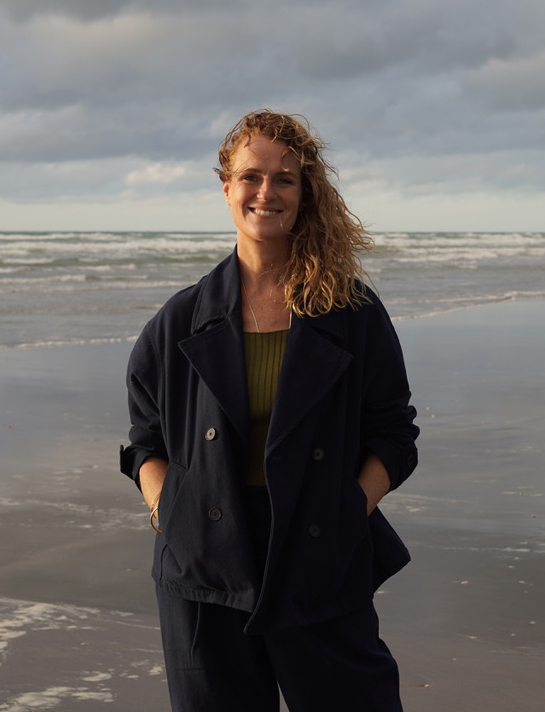
- Martha Jeffries in 2025
- Born: Martha Jeffries
- Occupations: Film director; Climate communications specialist; Producer
- Years active: 2003–present
- Spouse: Martin Basher
- Relatives: Bill Jeffries (father); John Jeffries (brother)

Martha Jeffries (born 1978) is a New Zealand filmmaker, specialising in climate communications, science-related media and advocacy.

Jeffries is known for her work directing and producing episodes for the Emmy Award-winning documentary series Years of Living Dangerously for National Geographic, the NHNZ series Dynamic Planet screened on PBS and Arte, and OceanXplorers from filmmaker James Cameron, also for National Geographic and Disney Plus.

== Early and personal life ==
Martha Jeffries was born in Wellington New Zealand to parents Bill Jeffries, a former New Zealand Labour Party politician, and Shona Jeffries, a teacher. She trained as a flute player, completing a degree in classical music, and had embarked on a career in music until her mid-twenties when she began film and TV production work. After a period of living and working in Sweden, Denmark and Austria, Martha moved to New York in 2010 to be with her partner, New Zealand/American artist Martin Basher, where they had twin daughters born in 2018. They have lived in New Zealand since 2022, but maintain a property in the Catskills region of New York State.

== Filmmaking career ==
In her early 20's, Jeffries taught herself film direction from books and began directing music videos, producing for New Zealand music chart-topping hip hop artist Chong Nee, Dei Hamo, Eden Mulholland and later The Juan Maclean. She directed her first television series at age 26, a New Zealand travel show called Are We There Yet and beginning in 2008 Jeffries directed five seasons of the international food and travel series World Kitchen.

In 2015 she met TV producers David Gelber and Joel Bach, known for their work on current affairs show 60 Minutes, and was offered a directing role on their Emmy Award-winning documentary series Years of Living Dangerously, featuring James Cameron and Arnold Schwarzenegger as executive producers. She directed and produced two episodes in the second series, released in 2016, focusing on ocean warming (episode: Collapse of the Oceans) and carbon pricing (episode: Priceless).

Since working on Years of Living Dangerously, Jeffries has focused primarily on climate-change and science-related shows, including Invisible Killers, Dynamic Planet and OceanXplorers, hosted by James Cameron. Jeffries has directed and produced work across all seven continents.

== Activism ==
Jeffries has said that the decade she spent filming travel shows in sometimes-volatile locations revealed to her the impacts of climate change around the world:

My work on Years of Living Dangerously opened my eyes to the risk we face if we don't act on climate change. Once you know that stuff you can't unknow it. My life's work now is to communicate what we can do.

Jeffries has declared that action on climate change is her highest priority and the issue is "the greatest challenge of our time".

So many people care deeply about the climate crisis — they want to be part of the solution — but they feel overwhelmed, unsure where to start, or like their actions won't matter. So my goal is to focus on action - to inspire, engage and empower the people who care but don't know what to do.

She also advocates for more women to be working as directors in the film and television sector, saying "the rates of women working as directors at every level are dismal" despite relatively equal proportions of men and women graduating from film school. Jeffries also mentors young women looking to enter the film industry.

== Other work ==
Martha has spoken widely on climate storytelling, including at a UN conference at the Vatican. She was a founding board member and executive advisor of Good Energy, a Los Angeles-based non-profit focused on getting more and better climate stories into Hollywood, and she has been on the jury of the Oceanic Global short film festival.

== Filmography ==
=== TV Series ===
Year	Title	Role
2008	Intrepid Journeys	Field Producer
2009	Let's Get Inventin'	Director
2009-12	World Kitchen	Executive Producer, Director
2016	Years of Living Dangerously	Producer, Director
2018	Invisible Killers	Producer
2023	Dynamic Planet	Executive Producer
2024	OceanXplorers	Development Producer

=== Music videos ===
Year	Title	Artist
2006	Scenarios	Chong Nee
2006	Black Widow	Chong Nee and Dei Hamo
2006	You Got My Heart	Chong Nee
2009	Commandeering	Motocade
2014	A Simple Design	The Juan Maclean
2014	Beside Itself	Eden Mulholland
2014	River of Hurt	Eden Mulholland
2015	Utopia	Eden Mulholland
