= Tom McGuigan =

New Zealand politician (1921–2013)

The Honourable Tom McGuigan QSO JP
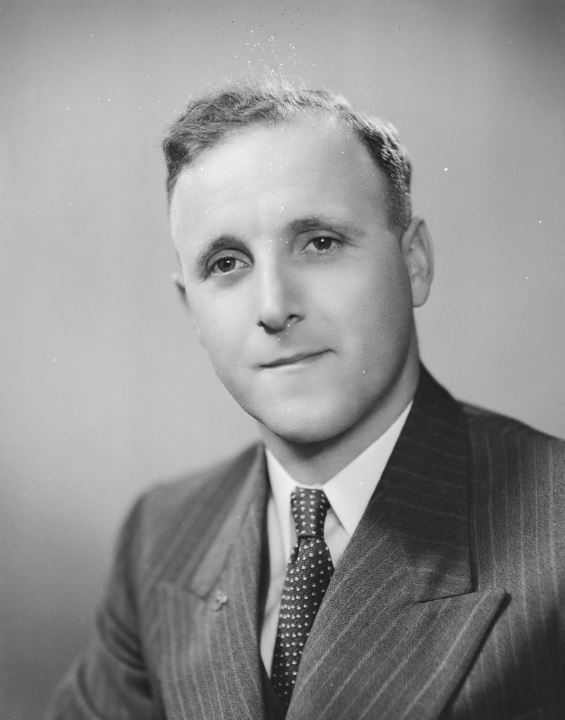
- McGuigan in 1959

23rd Minister of Health
- In office 10 September 1974 – 12 December 1975
- Prime Minister: Bill Rowling
- Preceded by: Bob Tizard
- Succeeded by: Frank Gill

20th Minister of Railways
- In office 8 December 1972 – 10 September 1974
- Prime Minister: Norman Kirk
- Preceded by: Peter Gordon
- Succeeded by: Ron Bailey

7th Minister of Electricity
- In office 8 December 1972 – 10 September 1974
- Prime Minister: Norman Kirk
- Preceded by: Les Gandar
- Succeeded by: Ron Bailey

Member of the New Zealand Parliament for Lyttelton
- In office 29 November 1969 – 30 October 1975
- Preceded by: Norman Kirk
- Succeeded by: Colleen Dewe

Personal details
- Born: 20 February 1921 Christchurch, New Zealand
- Died: 5 February 2013 (aged 91) Shirley, Christchurch, New Zealand
- Party: Labour
- Spouse: Ruth Deacon
- Children: 3

Thomas Malcolm McGuigan QSO JP (20 February 1921 – 5 February 2013) was a New Zealand politician of the Labour Party.

== Biography ==
=== Early life and career ===
McGuigan was born and raised in the Christchurch suburb of Woolston. He attended Christchurch Boys' High School and represented his school in various sports (cricket, soccer, and athletics). McGuigan then studied accountancy at Christchurch Technical College until World War II broke out. As a "child of the depression" he always felt class distinction, a feeling which was reinforced during the war. As an officer in the Royal New Zealand Navy, he felt uncomfortable at the great divide between officers and ratings. He visited many Asian countries, where poverty was rife and class differences stood out, he decided later to enter politics for this reason and improve people's living standards.

At the conclusion of the war, McGuigan married Englishwoman Ruth Deacon, the daughter of John Deacon, on 23 February 1946. After their marriage she had to travel to New Zealand separately from her armed services husband, like most war brides. She ended up arriving in New Zealand first, because the ship carrying McGuigan had to turn around at Fremantle and head back to England. McGuigan's fellow servicemen, the English rugby league team and a group of Catholic priests who had been on board were taken to Melbourne via a troop train instead. The rail journey was drawn out for about a week by frequent stops to allow other trains through, and to cook meals in the outdoors. McGuigan and his men went into an army camp at Melbourne to await a suitable ship to take them to New Zealand. They were reunited and settled in Christchurch and had one daughter and two sons.

McGuigan was an accountant and secretary from 1946 to 1954. He was the house manager at Christchurch Hospital (1955–1957), senior administration officer at Princess Margaret Hospital (1957–1969), house manager of Coronation House (1963–1969), and house manager at the North Canterbury Hospital Board (NCHB) Subsidiary Institution (1965–1969).

=== Political career ===
New Zealand Parliament
Years	Term	Electorate	Party
1969–1972	36th	Lyttelton	Labour
1972–1975	37th	Lyttelton	Labour

McGuigan stood unsuccessfully for Parliament in the 1954 election in Lyttelton. He initially had a 36-vote lead on election night, but his small majority was eroded after the counting of special votes. After failing to win the seat, McGuigan decided not to stand again but to commit himself to his career in hospital administration for the foreseeable future. Despite his name being mentioned for the Riccarton by-election in 1956, but declined to seek the nomination, citing personal reasons. He instead suggested his friend Norman Kirk stand in 1957 election for Lyttelton, and became electorate organiser when Kirk took the seat.

He later stood as a Labour Party candidate for the Christchurch City Council at a 1958 by-election, but was unsuccessful. At the 1960 election he was selected as the Labour candidate in the Fendalton electorate, but later withdrew his candidature.

When Kirk switched to the Sydenham electorate in 1969, McGuigan stood to replace him for Lyttelton and won selection. McGuigan was elected to Parliament in the 1969 election in the Lyttelton electorate. When Labour formed a government after the 1972 election, Norman Kirk appointed McGuigan as Minister of Railways, and Minister of Electricity. As Minister of Electricity he was instructed by Kirk in February 1973 to not raise the level of Lake Manapouri fulfilling Labour's election pledge during the Save Manapouri campaign. He created an independent body, the Guardians of Lake Manapouri, Monowai, and Te Anau (composed of leading members of the protest) to oversee management of the lake levels. He also had to react to New Zealand's growing power demands, but refused to resort to nuclear power, reaffirming the government's anti-nuclear stance. He became known as one of the economic realists in the cabinet and frequently argued against tear-away spending. After Kirk's sudden death, the new prime minister, Bill Rowling, appointed McGuigan to the portfolio that he had really wanted - Minister of Health. He oversaw completion of the White Paper on Health, which called for establishment of partly elected district health boards and a centralised computer system to improve administration. The plan was thrown out however by the incoming National Government. He also approved a cardio-thoracic unit at Christchurch Hospital, but it took twenty years until such a unit was established.

McGuigan visited Vietnam near the end of the Vietnam War. New Zealand was providing aid to help rebuild Vietnam's health infrastructure following withdrawal of New Zealand troops. Inspecting the work, he was stunned by evidence all around of the effects of war damage and that gunfire could still be heard clearly in the distance. McGuigan was unexpectedly defeated in the 1975 election by Colleen Dewe of the National Party.

At the 1980 local-body elections he was elected a member of the North Canterbury Hospital Board. Despite being a first time candidate he "topped the poll" receiving more votes than any other candidate at the election. McGuigan was re-elected to the board in 1983, but did not seek re-election in 1986. The Labour Party's directional shift to neo-liberal free market ideology (Rogernomics) in the mid-1980s worried him, but he remained loyal to the party, to which he was a life member. He commented on the changes in 2001 saying "I still believe firmly that essential services which operated successfully for many years should have remained in the hands of the people, that is, the Government. Control of many areas has slipped out of New Zealanders' hands, which I regret. We just seem to be swallowed up by privatisation and overseas interests."

=== Later life and death ===
McGuigan was active in the administration of soccer, and in 1974–1975 was the president of the New Zealand Football Association. He was for many years the secretary of the Canterbury Football Association, and he refereed boys' soccer. After exiting parliament he ran a management consultancy firm.

In the 1986 New Year Honours, McGuigan was appointed a Companion of the Queen's Service Order for public services. He died at Windsor House, a rest home in Christchurch's suburb of Shirley, on 5 February 2013, aged 91. His wife had died before him.

== Notes ==
Political offices
Preceded by Bob Tizard	Minister of Health; 1974–1975	Succeeded by Frank Gill
Preceded by Les Gandar	Minister of Electricity; 1972–1974	Succeeded by Ron Bailey
Preceded by Peter Gordon	Minister of Railways; 1972–1974	Succeeded by Ron Bailey
Preceded by Allan Highet	Minister of Civil Defence; 1972–1974	Succeeded by Henry May
New Zealand Parliament
Preceded by Norman Kirk	Member of Parliament for Lyttelton; 1969–1975	Succeeded by Colleen Dewe
