= New Zealand Democratic Coalition =

The New Zealand Democratic Coalition was a proposed moderate political party intended to contest the 1996 General Election. It would have been led by former Prime Minister Mike Moore and was intended to capture the balance of power on election night. Ultimately it was not registered and Moore stayed with Labour for the 1996 election.

== Background ==
Following a push for Electoral reform in New Zealand, a referendum was held alongside the 1993 general election that gave voters a choice between the current electoral system, First Past the Post, and the Mixed Member Proportional system. This created opportunities for many smaller parties to be formed and win representation in parliament.

Mike Moore had been replaced as Labour Party leader following the party's defeat in the 1993 election. After losing the leadership Moore was overwhelmed with boxes full of letters of support, many suggesting him launch a new party. Michael Laws had become a rebel backbencher in the National Party caucus since his former boss, Winston Peters, had left the party in 1992. To prepare for the upcoming MMP system Moore had sent his campaign organiser Jeff McIntyre to Germany and study how minor parties campaigned under MMP. He spent most of his time with the centrist Free Democratic Party (FDP).

== History ==
Early in 1994 Michael Laws and Mike Moore appeared on TVNZ's current affairs programme Fraser together. Here they discuss the opportunities for a new centre party on air. The two reportedly decided afterwards that they should meet again to further discuss this opportunity. A meeting between Moore and Michelle Boag was organised in "late 1994" by Laws to discuss the potential of National Party donors financing a new Centre party. In 1995 meetings in Wellington between five interested MPs began. These were reportedly centered around the Yangtze restaurant in Wellington. Mike Moore was still uncommitted to the project however.

Involved in the discussions were;

- Mike Moore - Former Prime Minister who had been replaced as Labour leader after the 1993 election.
- Michael Laws - National backbench MP.
- Geoff Braybrooke - Labour MP & Friend of Moore.
- Jack Elder - Labour MP & one of Moore's caucus allies.
- Peter McCardle - National MP.
- Clayton Cosgrove - Mike Moore's former Private Secretary in Christchurch.
- Ron Mark - Former Labour Party Candidate for the Selwyn electorate.
- Tony Day - Moore's local campaign organiser and former Fendalton candidate for Labour.

Also rumored to be potential invitees to the new party were Damien O'Connor and Elizabeth Tennet.

A "breakfast club" was later formed in which Laws, McCardle, Moore and Elder regularly meet to further discussions. Braybrooke was left out of these as he was suffering ill-health but he reportedly remained determined to follow Moore to any new party. Many names were considered for the proposed party including the "Peoples Party" before Democratic Coalition is selected. Laws favoured Peoples Party, but it was thought to sound too communist. The party colours were to be yellow and black, inspired by the FDP in Germany. In August 1995 a "conference" was held in Christchurch that involves all the MPs as well as Cosgrove and Mark. Here they elected Rosy Fenwick, a Hastings GP and friend of Laws, to be secretary-general and form a document known as "The Aims & Objectives of the New Zealand Democratic Coalition". Moore declared that he was 95% Committed.

By the end of 1995 over 600 financial members were signed up and the party was ready to be registered (500 members are required to be registered under New Zealand electoral law). However Mike Moore was still undecided on forming the party. During the last week of the 1995 parliamentary session Moore met with Laws, McCardle and Elder to declare himself 99% committed. The first week of the 1996 parliamentary session was discussed as an ideal launch date. However, in an interview with The Sunday Star-Times the following weekend, Mike Moore stated that he was committed to Labour. In January 1996 a meeting was held in Moore's office. With Moore still uncommitted, Michael Laws told the others he will instead join the New Zealand First party. This led to Mike Moore pulling the plug on the project despite the other MPs still being keen.

== Aims and objectives ==
To Select candidates of ability and integrity for election to the New Zealand House of Representatives who accept and endorse the following principles, aims and objectives:

1. To protect and promote the family unit;
2. To respect and uphold the rights and liberty of the individual;
3. To promote equality of opportunity regardless of age, gender, ethnicity, socio-economic, cultural or religious background;
4. To provide economic and social policies that allow individuals to maximise their potential for both private and the common good;
5. To ensure the equality of all persons before the law...;
6. To protect New Zealand's territorial integrity and ensure this nation's independence in all international forums;
7. To promote co-operation and tolerance within the wider community;
8. To provide and promote an open and competitive economy that recognises and rewards enterprise and endeavour.
9. To provide policies that protect the weak and the vulnerable within our community and seek to empower those individuals to reach their potential.
10. To provide for and actively encourage the maximum possible participation in all aspects of local and central government decision-making;
11. To create an educated, enlightened, enterprising and responsible society and pursue policies to that end.
12. To provide an efficient, effective and accountable public sector that services the education, health and welfare needs of the wider community and is politically neutral and free of ideological bias;
13. To provide all members of the New Zealand Democratic Coalition with the opportunity to contribute to the organisation, policy and strategy of the Coalition.

== Aftermath ==
Michael Laws switched to the New Zealand First party in April 1996. However he was forced to resign as an MP shortly afterwards due to the "Antoinette Beck" scandal. He continued to work behind the scenes for New Zealand First helping them prepare for the 1996 election before retiring from politics. In 2004 he was elected the Mayor of Wanganui.

Ron Mark, Peter McCardle and Jack Elder followed Laws to the New Zealand First party and became list MPs after the 1996 election. New Zealand First ended up holding the balance of power and formed a coalition with the National Party. Peter McCardle became the Minister of Employment and Jack Elder was appointed the Minister of Police. Ron Mark became the government's senior whip. In the later break up of the New Zealand First party McCardle and Elder stayed with the Government but did not seek reelection in 1999. Ron Mark instead remained with New Zealand First and stayed in parliament until the parties defeat in 2008. He was re-elected to parliament for New Zealand First in the 2014 election.

Mike Moore, Clayton Cosgrove and Geoff Braybrooke instead remained with Labour. Moore was reelected as a Labour MP in 1996 but resigned in early 1999 so he could serve as the Director-General of the World Trade Organization. Moore's term ended on August 31, 2002. Cosgrove stood for Labour and was elected as the MP for Waimakariri in the 1999 election, replacing Moore. He was defeated in his electorate at the 2011 election, but remained in Parliament as a list MP until the 2017 election. Braybrooke retained the Napier seat until he retired at the 2002 election.

Moore reflected in a 2017 interview on the discussions of the new party. When asked what stopped him following through he said "I'm Labour, I couldn't do it".
