= Minister of Electricity (New Zealand) =

New Zealand minister of the Crown

The Minister of Electricity was a minister in the government of New Zealand with responsibility for the New Zealand Electricity Department.

== History ==
The First Labour Government enacted the Electricity Act 1945 which split the hydro-electric branch of the Works Department would be constituted as a separate organisation. Additionally a Minister-in-Charge was to be made responsible for the administration of both the Act and the newly established State Hydro-electric Department. In 1958 the Second Labour Government passed the Electricity Amendment Act which established a dedicated Electricity portfolio as a full cabinet level role, whose minister was responsible for the administration of the Electricity Act and accountability for the New Zealand Electricity Department (superseding the State Hydro-electric Department). In 1978 the Electricity portfolio was abolished and its responsibilities were transferred to the Minister of Energy after the Third National Government passed the Ministry of Energy Act 1977.

== List of ministers ==
The following ministers held the office of Minister of Electricity.

Key

Labour National

No.	Name	Portrait	Term of Office		Prime Minister
1	Bob Semple		7 December 1945	13 December 1949	Fraser
2	Stan Goosman		13 December 1949	12 December 1957	Holland
2	Stan Goosman		13 December 1949	12 December 1957	Holyoake
3	Hugh Watt		12 December 1957	12 December 1960	Nash
(2)	Stan Goosman		12 December 1960	20 December 1963	Holyoake
4	Tom Shand		20 December 1963	11 December 1969	Holyoake
5	Percy Allen		11 December 1969	9 February 1972	Holyoake
6	Les Gandar		9 February 1972	8 December 1972	Marshall
7	Tom McGuigan		8 December 1972	10 September 1974	Kirk
8	Ron Bailey		10 September 1974	12 December 1975	Rowling
9	Eric Holland		12 December 1975	8 March 1977	Muldoon
10	George Gair		8 March 1977	6 October 1977	Muldoon

== See also ==
- Electricity in New Zealand
