= Minister for Rail =

New Zealand minister of the Crown

- Coat of Arms of New Zealand

- Flag of New Zealand

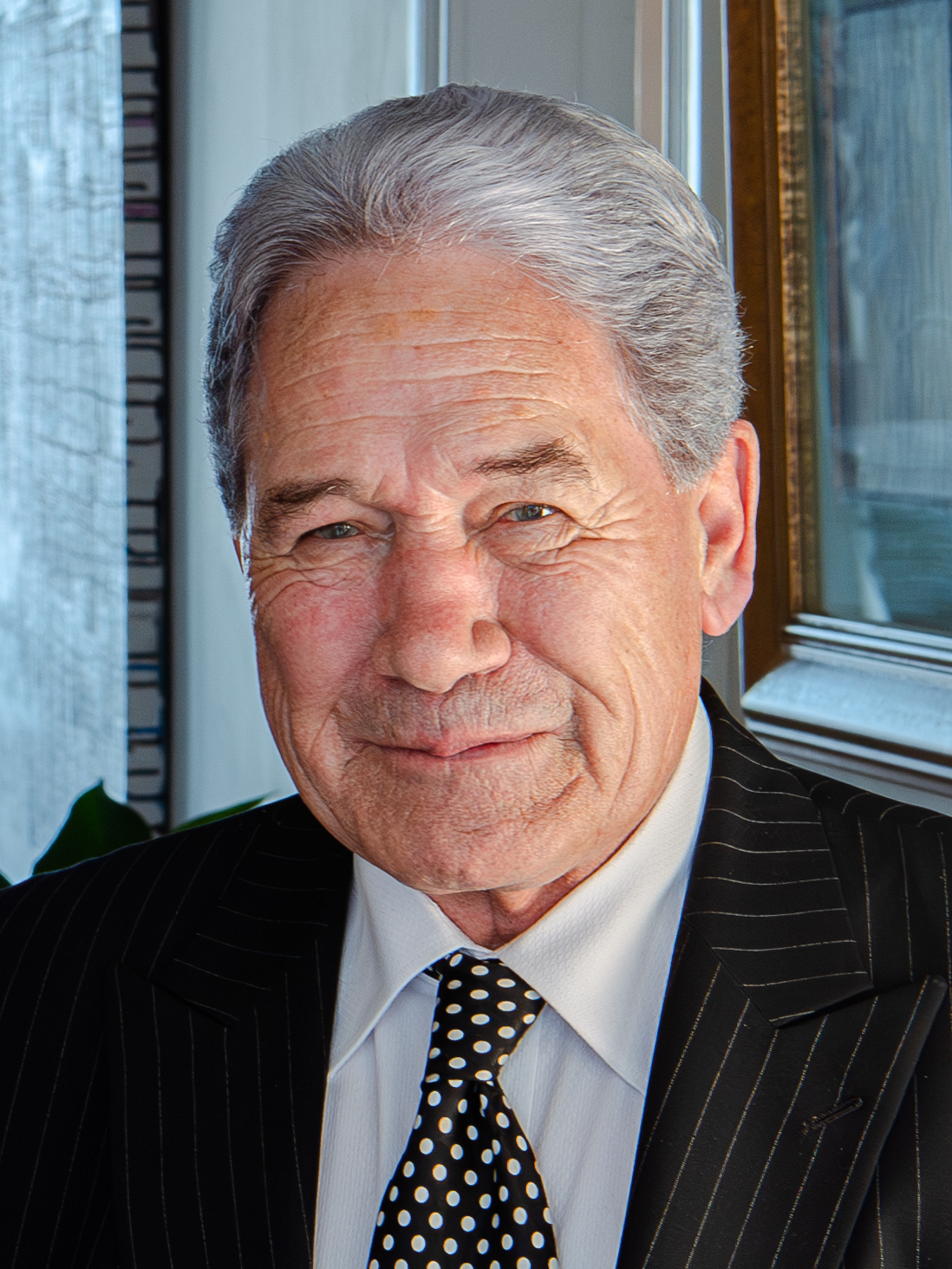
- Incumbent; Winston Peters since 11 December 2024
- KiwiRail Holdings Limited; New Zealand Railways Corporation
- Style: The Honourable
- Member of: Cabinet of New Zealand; Executive Council
- Reports to: Prime Minister of New Zealand
- Appointer: Governor-General of New Zealand
- Term length: At His Majesty's pleasure
- Formation: 24 November 1895
- First holder: Alfred Cadman
- Salary: $313,100
- Website: www.beehive.govt.nz

The minister for rail, formerly the minister of railways, is a New Zealand Government minister responsible for KiwiRail, the state-owned enterprise that operates the national rail network and the Interislander ferry service. The position was recreated in 2024 after a twenty-year period in abeyance.

The current minister for rail is Winston Peters.

== History ==
The position of Minister of Railways was created in 1895 to oversee the New Zealand Railways Department fifteen years after the department was formed. The minister's purview shifted to the New Zealand Railways Corporation in 1981 and gained New Zealand Rail Limited in 1990. The railway network was privatised in 1993 and the portfolio was disestablished.

The rail network came back into public ownership in 2008 (see KiwiRail) but separate ministerial responsibility for rail was not restored until 2024. Until that time, the Minister of State Owned Enterprises and Minister of Transport were the shareholding ministers for KiwiRail.

== Office-holders ==
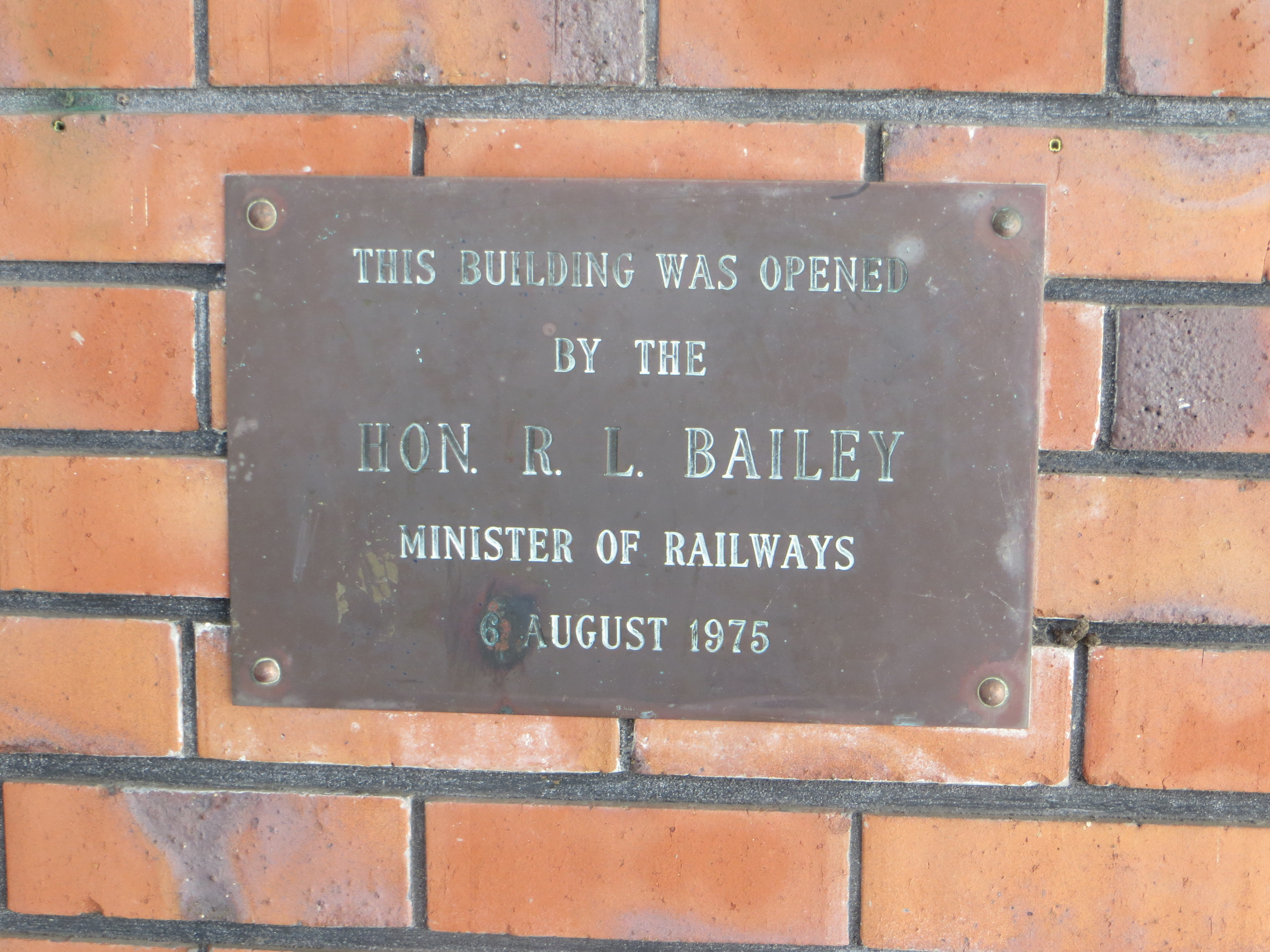
Plaque next to main entrance of Hamilton Railway Station – opened by Hon Ron Bailey, 1975

The following MPs have held the office of Minister for Rail:

Key

Liberal Reform United Labour National New Zealand First

No.	Name	Portrait	Term of Office		Prime Minister
As Minister of Railways
1	Alfred Cadman		1 January 1895	21 December 1899	Seddon
2	Joseph Ward		5 January 1900	6 August 1906	Seddon
2	Joseph Ward		5 January 1900	6 August 1906	Hall-Jones
3	William Hall-Jones		6 August 1906	30 November 1908	Ward
4	John A. Millar		6 January 1909	28 March 1912	Ward
5	Arthur Myers		28 March 1912	10 July 1912	Mackenzie
6	William Herries		10 July 1912	3 September 1919	Massey
7	William Massey		3 September 1919	16 May 1922	Massey
8	David Guthrie		16 May 1922	6 June 1923	Massey
9	Gordon Coates		6 June 1923	10 December 1928	Massey
9	Gordon Coates		6 June 1923	10 December 1928	Bell
9	Gordon Coates		6 June 1923	10 December 1928	Coates
10	William Taverner		10 December 1928	28 May 1930	Ward
11	Bill Veitch		28 May 1930	22 September 1931	Forbes
12	George Forbes		22 September 1931	6 December 1935	Forbes
13	Dan Sullivan		6 December 1935	12 December 1941	Savage
13	Dan Sullivan		6 December 1935	12 December 1941	Fraser
14	Bob Semple		12 December 1941	12 December 1949	Fraser
15	Stan Goosman		13 December 1949	26 November 1954	Holland
16	John McAlpine		26 November 1954	12 December 1957	Holland
16	John McAlpine		26 November 1954	12 December 1957	Holyoake
17	Mick Moohan		12 December 1957	12 December 1960	Nash
(16)	John McAlpine		12 December 1960	12 December 1966	Holyoake
17	Peter Gordon		12 December 1966	8 December 1972	Holyoake
17	Peter Gordon		12 December 1966	8 December 1972	Marshall
18	Tom McGuigan		8 December 1972	10 September 1974	Kirk
19	Ron Bailey		10 September 1974	12 December 1975	Rowling
20	Colin McLachlan		12 December 1975	11 December 1981	Muldoon
21	George Gair		11 December 1981	26 July 1984	Muldoon
22	Richard Prebble		26 July 1984	4 November 1988	Lange
23	David Lange		4 November 1988	8 November 1988	Lange
24	Stan Rodger		8 November 1988	9 February 1990	Lange
24	Stan Rodger		8 November 1988	9 February 1990	Palmer
(22)	Richard Prebble		9 February 1990	2 November 1990	Palmer
(22)	Richard Prebble		9 February 1990	2 November 1990	Moore
25	Doug Kidd		2 November 1990	3 October 1991	Bolger
26	Maurice McTigue		3 October 1991	1 July 1993	Bolger
27	Wyatt Creech		1 July 1993	21 December 1993	Bolger
28	Philip Burdon		21 December 1993	16 December 1996	Bolger
As Minister for Rail
29	Winston Peters		11 December 2024	present	Luxon

== See also ==
- Rail transport in New Zealand
