= John Jeffries (judge) =

New Zealand politician, civil servant and judge

The Honourable Sir John Jeffries
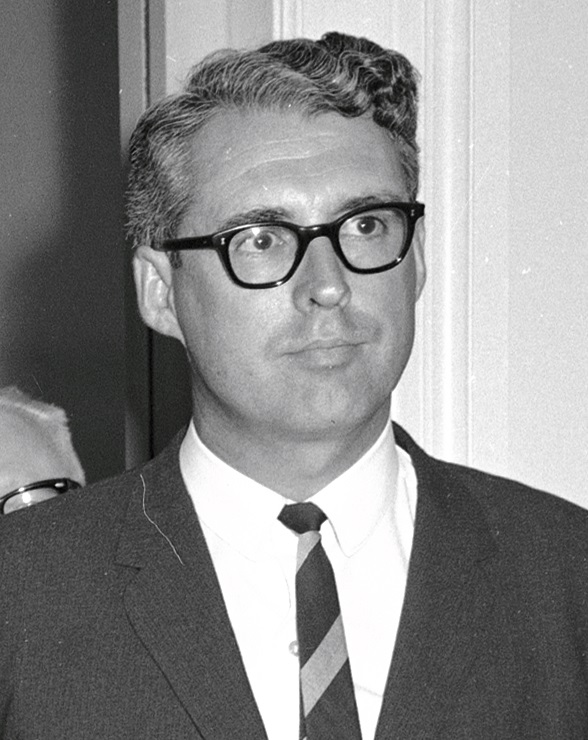
- Jeffries in 1966

14th Deputy Mayor of Wellington
- In office 29 October 1971 – 13 November 1974
- Mayor: Sir Frank Kitts
- Preceded by: George Porter
- Succeeded by: Ian Lawrence

Member of the Wellington City Council
- In office 13 October 1962 – 12 October 1974
- Constituency: At-large

Personal details
- Born: John Francis Jeffries; 28 March 1929 Wellington, New Zealand
- Died: 25 January 2019 (aged 89) Wellington, New Zealand
- Party: Labour
- Spouse: Joan Patricia Christensen
- Relations: Bill Jeffries (brother); Martha Jeffries (niece)
- Education: Victoria University College
- Profession: Lawyer

Sir John Francis Jeffries (28 March 1929 – 25 January 2019) was a New Zealand local politician, civil servant and later a judge of the High Court.

== Biography ==
=== Early life and career ===
Jeffries was born in Wellington on 28 March 1929 to Frank and Mary Jeffries and grew up in Lyall Bay. He was the second born in a family of five. His mother was a schoolteacher and his father was a joiner by trade who was unemployed during the Great Depression. His family experienced much prejudice in their lives due to their Irish Catholic background. He was educated at St Patrick's College. He failed his School Certificate exam three times and the college rector wrote a reference for Jeffries recommending to prospective employers not to hire him for a job requiring study.

He began work in 1946, first as an insurance clerk, and then as a teacher. Upon finding employment he contracted tuberculosis. While at Wellington Hospital he was nursed in by Joan Patricia (Pat) Christensen. The pair married in 1951 and would adopt two children together.

He received his tertiary education at Victoria University College, graduating from first with a Bachelor of Arts in 1956 and later a Bachelor of Law in 1959. Then he became first a law clerk before qualifying as a lawyer himself. He was admitted to the bar in 1961 and became a partner in the firm of Scott, Hardie Boys, Morrison and Jeffries (alongside Sir Michael Hardie Boys). He later became vice-president of the New Zealand Law Society. He was a member of the panel of prosecuting counsel who regularly conducted Supreme Court prosecutions on the instruction of the Crown Solicitor.

=== Political career ===
In 1962 Jeffries was elected to the Wellington City Council on a Labour Party ticket, remaining on the council for 12 years. In doing so, he became the youngest candidate ever elected as a councillor (at that time) aged 33. Ahead of the 1968 election, after two terms, Jeffries announced he would not stand for re-election, however he later recanted and stood again successfully. After the election he became leader of the Labour caucus on the council and in 1971 he was elected deputy-mayor to Sir Frank Kitts. Jeffries himself had mayoral aspirations, but they were unable to be realised due to the reluctance of Kitts to retire.

Jeffries was the chairman of the council trading committee, which controlled the city operations in milk delivery, electricity and abattoirs. He was given the label "Mr. Fixit" from the Sunday News after making steady progress on issues that others had given up on. His younger brother Bill Jeffries succeeded him as a Councillor and was later an MP. A later Wellington mayor, Sir Michael Fowler, later described both the Jeffries brothers as "extremely good" councillors.

He had several failed bids to enter national politics. Jeffries was approached to stand for Labour in the 1967 Petone by-election however he was not selected as a candidate. The Labour Party later offered him the candidacy for the seat of Miramar which Labour had lost in an upset at the 1966 general election. However, he declined, instead hoping to win nomination for a safer Labour seat in the Hutt Valley. To his frustration the Labour Party executive ruled it out.

In 1974 Jeffries was appointed by the government as chairman of the National Housing Commission. In 1975 he was appointed as the chairman of Air New Zealand. That same year he was a signatory of the Citizens for Rowling campaign which urged voters to support Labour in the 1975 election. He resigned later in the year, following the election, after receiving criticisms from incoming Prime Minister Robert Muldoon over the appointees of the outgoing Labour government.

=== Judicial career ===
In 1976 he was appointed as a Judge of the High Court serving in this capacity until his retirement in 1992. He was appointed by Muldoon who retracted his previous criticisms of Jeffries saying he was "a very fine lawyer and an honourable man", however it failed to allay suspicions that he appointed Jeffries to rule him out of politics.

Jeffries delivered three significant judgments in his career. First he found against an Australian wine company who claimed the right to use the label "champagne" for its brand of sparkling wine, ruling that only makers from the French region of Champagne were solely entitled to use the term. Later he clarified the previously vague, unsatisfactory definition of the word "welfare" pertaining to child custody cases. In another decision he upheld a Planning Tribunal decision restricting state power company Electricorp's right to extract water from the Tongariro River as part of a hydro scheme, a significant victory for local Iwi.

In 1977, Jeffries was awarded the Queen Elizabeth II Silver Jubilee Medal, and in 1990 he received the New Zealand 1990 Commemoration Medal. In the 1993 New Year Honours, Jeffries was appointed a Knight Bachelor, for his service to New Zealand's legal system.

=== Later activities ===
From 1992 to 1997 he was the head of the Police Complaints Authority. In July 1997 he was appointed chairman of the New Zealand Press Council, a position he held until July 2005. He was also Commissioner of Security Warrants.

He died in Wellington aged 89 years on 25 January 2019.

== Notes ==
Political offices
Preceded by George Porter	Deputy Mayor of Wellington; 1971–1974	Succeeded by Ian Lawrence
