= Heather Simpson (civil servant) =

New Zealand civil servant

Heather Simpson is a New Zealand civil servant who was chief of staff for Prime Minister of New Zealand Helen Clark for nine years and who worked with Clark for more than 20 years.

== Political career ==
Simpson was born in Invercargill and by 1987 was an economics lecturer at the University of Otago. She stood for Parliament twice for Labour, in Awarua in 1987 election and in Heretaunga in 1993 election. In both cases she came second, losing by 2,480 votes in Awarua and 832 votes in Heretaunga. Simpson had been widely tipped to win Heretaunga, a normally safe Labour seat, with Labour leader Mike Moore even assisting her to win the nomination over Upper Hutt City Councillor Nicola Meek and trade union secretary Rick Barker. In a close election the result had a big impact on National's majority of just one seat. Moore was sure the seat would be reclaimed and was disappointed that it was not.

Simpson worked for Helen Clark, in a variety of roles, for more than 20 years. Simpson's working relationship with Clark began in 1987; Clark was a Cabinet Minister and Simpson was a policy advisor to her. Later, Simpson became director of policy and research for the parliamentary Labour Party, then became Chief of Staff after Clark became prime minister. Simpson acted as Clark's enforcer and policy overseer. Simpson was Clark's Chief of Staff for Clark's entire tenure as New Zealand Prime Minister, from 1999 to 2008.

In her time working for Helen Clark, Simpson was known as "the second-most powerful woman in New Zealand", and as "H2" (where Prime Minister Helen Clark was "H1"). Clark herself once joked that Simpson was actually the most powerful woman in the country. Simpson had a serious reputation within high-level politics. The encyclopedia Te Ara describes Simpson as "a very powerful political adviser", avoiding the spotlight but "behind the scenes was 'across everything', as one minister put it." In an editorial about Simpson in 2018, a writer for the Southland Times said that "large chunks of the Wellington bureaucracy found her scary" and that her close line of thinking with Clark meant that "if you struck a deal with Simpson, or failed to, the same would pretty reliably be true of the PM."

During her time as chief of staff, Simpson faced criticism over her handling of Labour's election spending in the 2005 election. Labour spent $440,000 on printing and distributing pledge cards. Legal advice to police at the time was that if Simpson was charged for authorising the expenditure of Parliamentary Service funds for the card and a pamphlet, "such a charge would be likely to result in a conviction", but no charges were laid. Police advice considered that since "all political parties engage in similar use of parliamentary funds for political advertising", it would be inequitable to single [Simpson] out for prosecution."

When Helen Clark became head of the United Nations Development Programme, Simpson also went to New York to work for Clark. It was reported that she initially did not want to move to New York but that "her arm was twisted". In her role as special advisor to Clark, Simpson helped Clark to reform the United Nations Development Programme which included cutting staff and providing greater transparency about spending and work in developing countries with its $US5 billion annual budget.

In 2018, Simpson was selected to head a review of the New Zealand government's health and disability system. Its interim report was released in September 2019 and its final report was released to the public on 16 June 2020.

In August 2020, Heather Simpson and Brian Roche were chosen to lead a new group to support the Ministry of Health in improving COVID-19 border security.

== Personal life ==
Simpson was the fourth of seven children in a family from Southland. Simpson entered into a civil union with partner, Sue Veart, in 2009.
