= 1977 Special Honours (New Zealand) =

Awards list for New Zealand

The 1977 Special Honours in New Zealand was a Special Honours List, published on 1 November 1977, that recognised the service of the outgoing vice-regal couple, Sir Denis and Lady Blundell.

== Companion of the Queen's Service Order (QSO) ==
For community service

- June Daphne, Her Excellency Lady Blundell

For public services

- His Excellency Sir Edward Denis Blundell GCMG GCVO KBE – principal companion of the Queen's Service Order since 1975, and governor-general and commander-in-chief in and over New Zealand since 1972
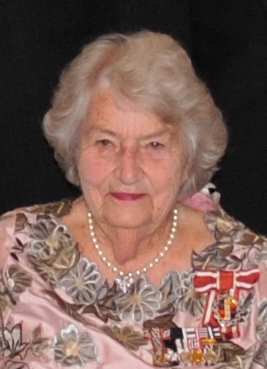
June, Lady Blundell

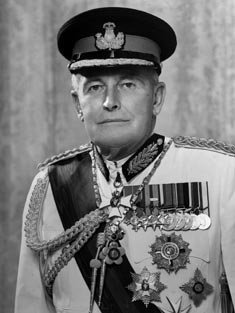
Sir Denis Blundell
