= Spouse of the governor-general of New Zealand =

The spouse of the governor-general of New Zealand generally assists the office-holder in welcoming ambassadors and their spouses, and in performing their other official duties. The governor-general's spouse traditionally participates in celebratory occasions, attends functions and, as a patron of various voluntary associations, works to promote the activities of those associations. None of the activities have any official status. The spouse of the administrator of the Government fulfills the role when the administrator (chief justice) performs the function of the governor-general.

The current spouse (since 21 October 2021) is Richard Davies, husband of Cindy Kiro.

Both the governor-general and their spouse are entitled to the style "His/Her Excellency" during the governor-general's term of office, but not thereafter. The governor-general is entitled to the style "The Right Honourable" for life; this does not extend to the spouse.

Most of the spouses of governors-general have been content to be background figures providing the office-holder with support. Some have been all but unknown to the general New Zealand public. However, a few have been notable in their own right, and details are shown in the following table.

== List of spouses of the governor-general of New Zealand ==
#	Governor-General	Term start	Term end	Spouse	Born	Died	Notes
1	Arthur Foljambe, 2nd Earl of Liverpool	28 June 1917	8 July 1920	Annette Monck, Countess of Liverpool GBE	23 May 1875	25 May 1948	Annette Monck was the daughter of Henry Monck, 5th Viscount Monck.
2	John Jellicoe, 1st Earl Jellicoe	27 September 1920	12 December 1924	Florence Gwendoline Cayzer, Lady Jellicoe	20 July 1877	12 May 1964	Florence Gwendoline Cayzer was the daughter of the shipping magnate Sir Charles Cayzer.
3	Sir Charles Fergusson, 7th Baronet	13 December 1924	8 February 1930	Alice Mary Boyle, Lady Alice Fergusson	18 December 1877	1 January 1958	Lady Alice Mary Boyle was the daughter of David Boyle, 7th Earl of Glasgow.
4	Charles Bathurst, 1st Viscount Bledisloe	19 March 1930	15 March 1935	Hon Bertha Susan, Lady Bledisloe	c. 1869	1926	Hon Bertha Susan was the daughter of Henry Charles Lopes, 1st Baron Ludlow.
5	George Monckton-Arundell, 8th Viscount Galway	12 April 1935	3 February 1941	Lucia Margaret White, Lady Galway	3 December 1890	1983	Lucia Margaret White was the daughter of the Luke White, 3rd Baron Annaly.
6	Cyril Newall, 1st Baron Newall	22 February 1941	19 April 1946	Olive Foster, Lady Newall	?	c. 1988	
7	Bernard Freyberg, 1st Baron Freyberg	17 June 1946	15 August 1952	Barbara Jekyll, Lady Freyberg	14 June 1887	24 September 1973	Lady Freyberg was daughter of Sir Herbert Jekyll and Dame Agnes Jekyll.
8	Willoughby Norrie, 1st Baron Norrie	2 December 1952	25 July 1957	Patricia Merryweather Bainbridge, Lady Norrie	March 1907	January 2001	Lady Norrie was the daughter of Emerson Muschamp Bainbridge and Norah Mossum (née Merryweather).
9	Charles Lyttelton, 10th Viscount Cobham	5 September 1957	13 September 1962	Elizabeth Alison Makeig-Jones, Lady Cobham	?	1986	
10	Bernard Fergusson, Baron Ballantrae	9 November 1962	20 October 1967	Laura Margaret Grenfell, Lady Ballantrae	14 April 1920	17 December 1979	
11	Sir Arthur Porritt, Baron Porritt	1 December 1967	7 September 1972	Kathleen Mary Peck, Lady Porritt	25 October 1913	13 July 1998	
12	Sir Denis Blundell	27 September 1972	5 October 1977	June Daphne Blundell, Lady Blundell	19 June 1922	31 October 2012	
13	Sir Keith Holyoake	26 October 1977	25 October 1980	Dame Norma Holyoake DCMG	7 March 1909	18 December 1984	
14	Sir David Beattie	6 November 1980	10 November 1985	Norma Margaret Sarah Macdonald, Lady Beattie	26 September 1925	9 May 2018	
15	Sir Paul Reeves	20 November 1985	29 November 1990	Beverley Watkins, Lady Reeves	1934	living	
16	Dame Catherine Tizard	13 December 1990	21 March 1996	Vacant			Catherine Tizard married Bob Tizard in 1951. They divorced in 1980. Bob Tizard was Deputy Prime Minister from 1974 to 1975.
17	Sir Michael Hardie Boys	21 March 1996	21 March 2001	Mary Zohrab, Lady Hardie Boys QSO	1 April 1933	26 June 2024	
18	Dame Silvia Cartwright	4 April 2001	4 August 2006	Peter Cartwright CNZM	3 May 1940	17 April 2019	
19	Sir Anand Satyanand	23 August 2006	23 August 2011	Susan Sharpe, Lady Satyanand	1947	living	
20	Sir Jerry Mateparae	31 August 2011	31 August 2016	Janine Grenside, Lady Mateparae	1965	living	
21	Dame Patsy Reddy	28 September 2016	28 September 2021	Sir David Gascoigne KNZM CBE	15 January 1941	October 2026	
22	Dame Cindy Kiro	21 October 2021	Incumbent	Richard Davies	1959	living	

== See also ==
- King consort
- Queen consort
- Spouse of the prime minister of New Zealand
