= Henry Blundell =

Henry Blundell may refer to:

- Henry Blundell (art collector) (1724–1810), English art collector
- Henry Blundell-Hollinshead-Blundell (1831–1906), British MP
- Henry Blundell (publisher) (1813–1878), New Zealand newspaper publisher
