= Vida Stout =

New Zealand limnologist and academic administrator (1930 - 2012)

- Born: Vida Mary Stout; 20 February 1930; Wellington, New Zealand
- Died: 21 July 2012 (aged 82); Christchurch, New Zealand
- Education: Victoria University of Wellington (MSc); Bedford College, University of London (PhD)
- Scientific career
- Fields: Limnology
- Workplaces: University of Canterbury
- Relatives: Duncan Stout (father); Robert Stout (grandfather); Anna Stout (grandmother)

Vida Mary Stout (20 February 1930 – 21 July 2012) was a New Zealand limnographer and academic administrator. She was the first woman to be Dean of Science at a New Zealand university.

== Biography ==
Stout was the daughter of Thomas Duncan MacGregor Stout and the granddaughter of Robert Stout and Anna Stout. Born and raised in Wellington, Stout was educated at Woodford House in Hawke's Bay, where she was Dux.

She then studied at Victoria University College, where she completed a Bachelor of Science and Masters of Science in zoology. Her Masters thesis was on "Hydracarina from the Wellington province". Stout then completed a PhD at Bedford College, University of London, where she studied Daphnia.

She returned to New Zealand after post-doctoral work in Sweden and in 1968 she and Ann Chapman founded the New Zealand Limnological Society (now the New Zealand Freshwater Sciences Society). Stout was the first president of the society and later was made an honorary life member. She was also a long-term member of the Canterbury branch of the Royal Society of New Zealand, and was the branch president in 1983.

Stout was appointed to the Zoology Department at the University of Canterbury in 1958, where she remained until her retirement in 1996. During her tenure she held the positions of dean of science from 1984 to 1998, deputy chair of the university's Academic Administration Committee from 1992 to 1995 and played a role in establishing the Masters in Environmental Science Course. Her research focused on the biology and chemistry of South Island lakes, including the nature and changes in zooplankton communities over time. She undertook long-term studies on lakes Pearson and Grassmere, near the university's Cass field station.

The University of Canterbury also holds her archives.

After retiring in 1996, Stout continued to go to her office almost every day until the university forbid her access, citing fears for her safety due to her progressive Parkinson's disease, which caused her death in 2012.

In 2017, Stout was selected as one of the Royal Society Te Apārangi's "150 women in 150 words", celebrating the contributions of women to knowledge in New Zealand.
