= Ruth Kirk =

New Zealand prominent anti-abortion campaigner (1922 – 2000)

Dame Ruth Kirk DBE

Spouse of the Prime Minister of New Zealand
- In role 8 December 1972 – 31 August 1974
- Preceded by: Margaret Marshall
- Succeeded by: Glen Rowling

Personal details
- Born: Lucy Ruth Miller; 28 April 1922 Taumarunui, New Zealand
- Died: 20 March 2000 (aged 77) Christchurch, New Zealand
- Spouse: Norman Kirk (m. 1943; died 1974)
- Children: 5, including John Kirk

Dame Lucy Ruth Kirk DBE (née Miller; 28 April 1922 – 20 March 2000) was a New Zealand prominent anti-abortion campaigner. Her husband was New Zealand's 29th Prime Minister, Norman Kirk.

== Biography ==
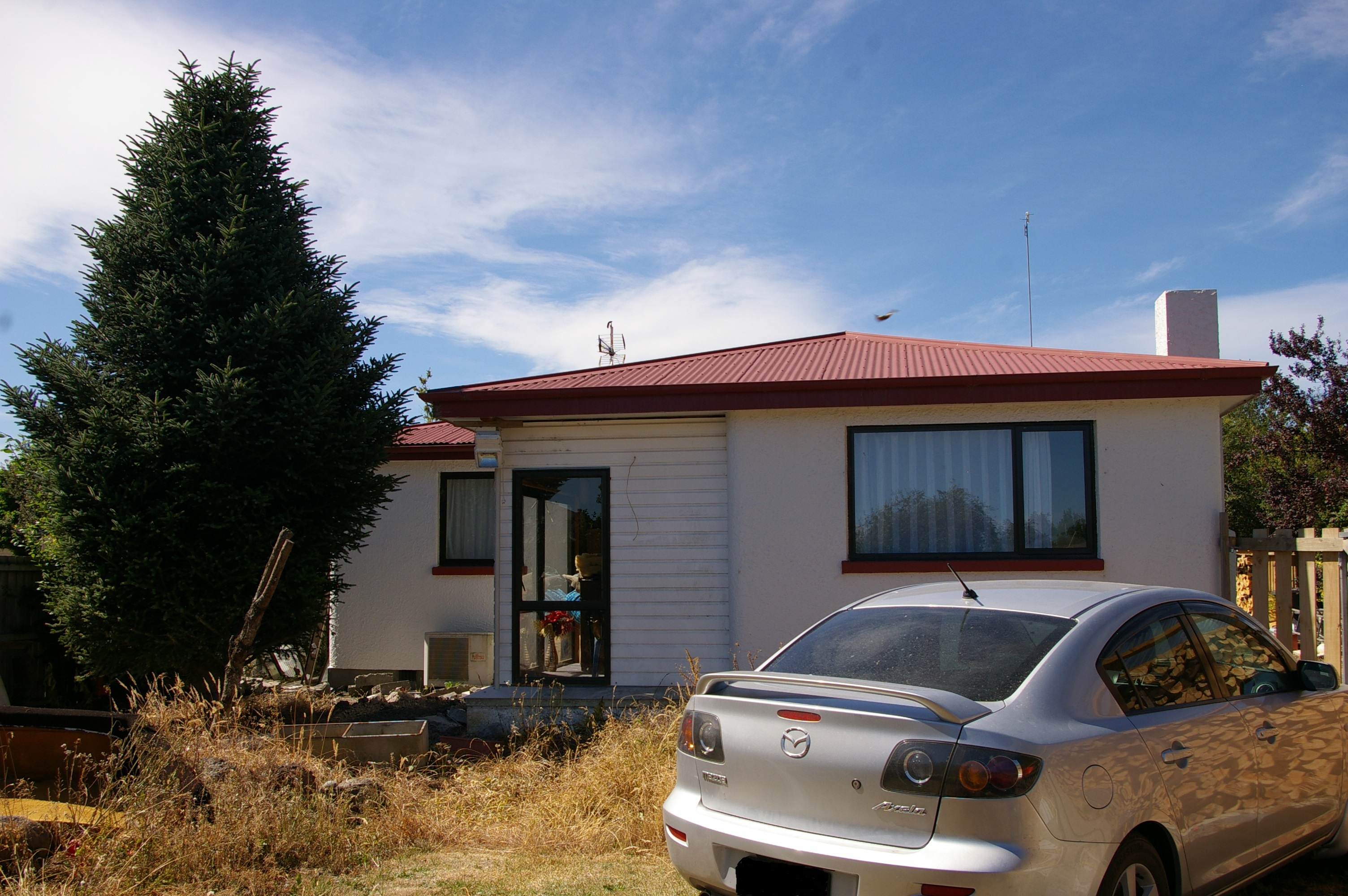
The former Kirk family home in Kaiapoi is registered by Historic Places Trust as a Category I heritage structure

Lucy Ruth Miller was born in Taumarunui in 1922, the daughter of postmaster George Miller and his wife Margaret.

She met her future husband, Norman Kirk, at a blind date in Paeroa; she was his first partner. On 17 July 1943, they married at Holy Trinity Church in Devonport, Auckland. The couple were to have three boys and two girls, including John Kirk, who succeeded his father as MP for Sydenham, and coastal geomorphologist Professor Bob Kirk.

In February 1944, they moved to Katikati in the Bay of Plenty. In 1948, they moved to Canterbury. Her husband worked at Firestone (now Bridgestone) in Papanui and in the evenings and weekend, built their house in Kaiapoi, where land was cheaper. During this time, she lived with her children at his parents' place in Christchurch. Once the house was finished, the family moved to Kaiapoi. On 28 May 1999, their house in Carew Street was registered by the Historic Places Trust as a Category I heritage structure.

Norman Kirk was elected Mayor of Kaiapoi in 1953. He resigned from the mayoralty in January 1958 after having won the November 1957 election in the Lyttelton electorate. The family moved to Christchurch in January 1958 to fulfil a promise to the Lyttelton electors.

In 1974, she became patron of the Society for the Protection of the Unborn Child. This caused a public furore, as her husband was Prime Minister at the time. Kirk joined protest marches in Wellington and Hamilton.

Her husband died in August 1974, and in the 1975 New Year Honours, she was appointed a Dame Commander of the Order of the British Empire, for public services.

Three months after her husband's death, she put gifts given to him by foreign leaders up for auction, which sparked some public debate. She was awarded the Queen Elizabeth II Silver Jubilee Medal in 1977.

Kirk largely withdrew from public life in later years, but was famously remembered for ringing a Christchurch talkback radio show in 1993 to voice her fury at Helen Clark's ousting of Mike Moore as Labour party leader.

She died from cancer in Christchurch on 20 March 2000, and was buried alongside her husband at Waimate in South Canterbury.
