= Lake Chapman (Antarctica) =

Lake at Granite Harbour, Antarctica

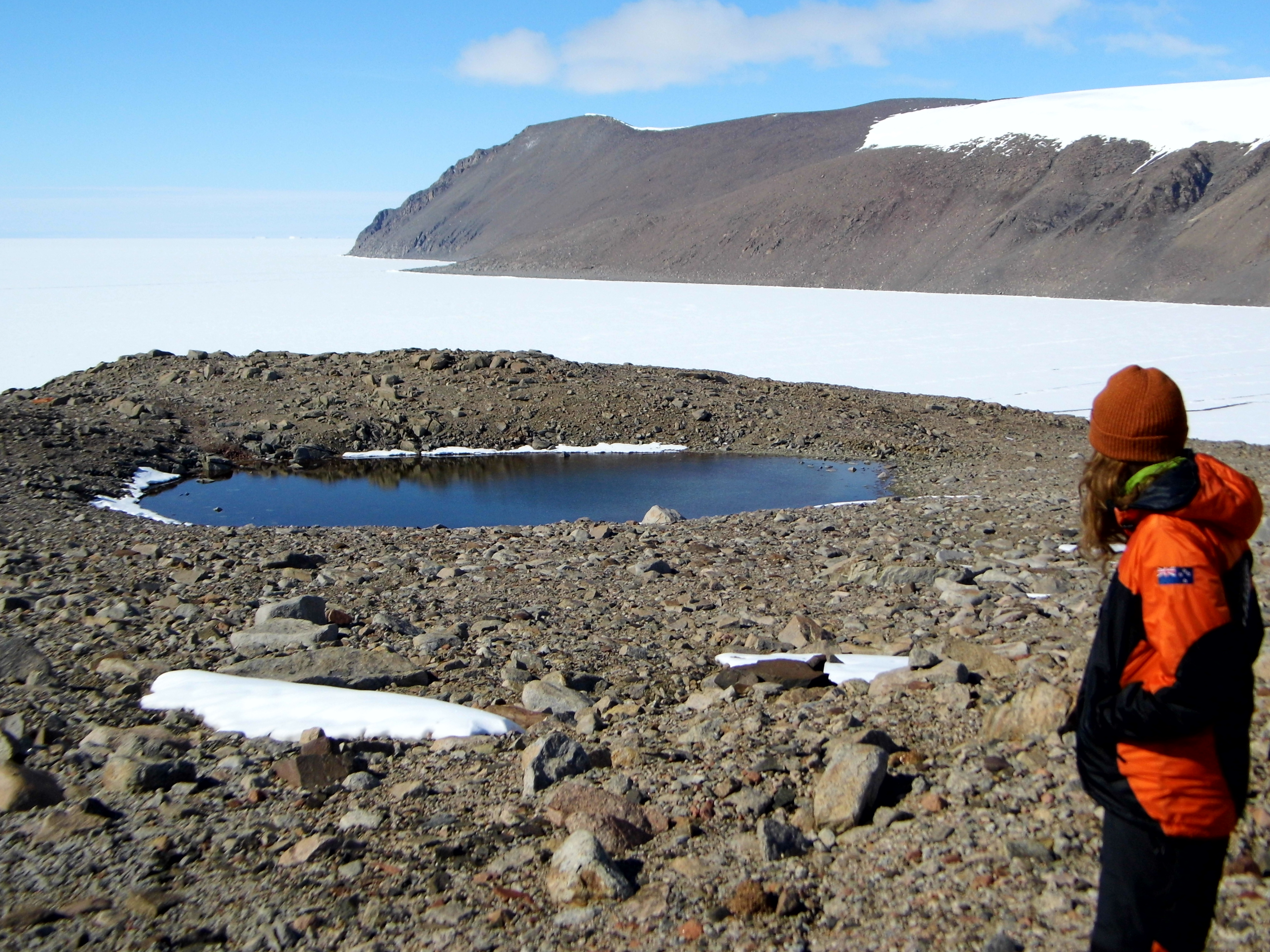
- Lake Chapman with Granite Harbour/Botany Bay in the background

- Location of Lake Chapman in Antarctica
- Location: Antarctica
- Coordinates: 77°1′0″S 162°23′0″E
- Etymology: Ann Chapman
- Basin countries: (Antarctica)

Lake Chapman is a small lake located on The Flatiron, at Granite Harbour within the Ross Dependency of Antarctica. It was first visited by members of Capt. Robert Falcon Scott's Western Party in 1911 and was one of the "pretty little tarns" observed by Griffith Taylor who was Senior Geologist to the expedition. Indeed, Tryggve Gran, another member of the Western Party, even used the lake for a swim to "celebrate Midsummer Day". More recently, it has been a site of active research undertaken by the University of Waikato as part of a larger terrestrial biodiversity research programme supported by the New Zealand Antarctic Research Institute (NZARI) and Antarctica New Zealand (AntNZ).

== Naming ==
Lake Chapman is named in honour of Ann Chapman, one of the first women scientists to visit the Ross Sea Region and the first woman to lead a scientific expedition in the Antarctic. Chapman led a team of scientists from the University of Waikato working on Antarctic lakes from 1970 to 1971, and was a founding member of the University of Waikato Antarctic Research Programme and the New Zealand Limnological Society (now the New Zealand Freshwater Sciences Society).
