= Christina Massey =

New Zealand politician and activist (1863–1932)

Dame Christina Massey GBE
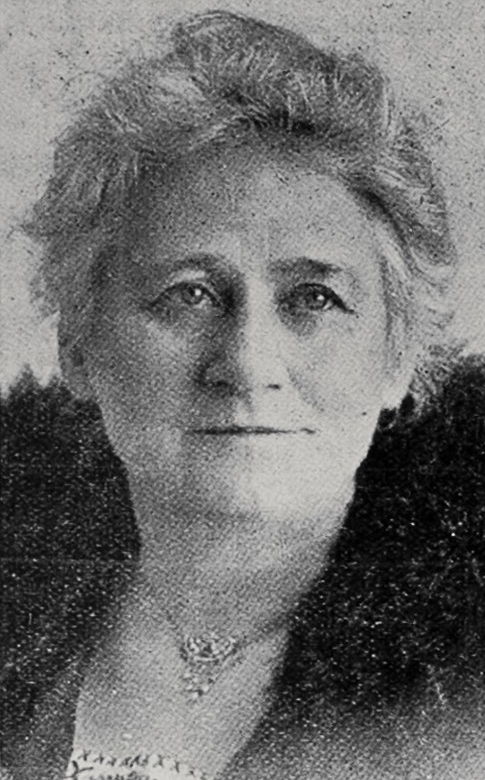

Spouse of the Prime Minister of New Zealand
- In role 10 July 1912 – 10 May 1925
- Preceded by: Ida Henrietta Mackenzie
- Succeeded by: Caroline Bell

Personal details
- Born: Christina Allan Paul; 11 January 1863 Forbes, New South Wales, Australia
- Died: 19 April 1932 (aged 69) Wellington, New Zealand
- Spouse: William Massey (m. 1882; died 1925)
- Children: 7
- Relatives: Walter Massey (son); Jack Massey (son)

Dame Christina Allan Massey GBE (née Paul; 11 January 1863 – 19 April 1932) was a New Zealand political hostess and community leader, the wife of William Massey, the 19th Prime Minister of New Zealand.

She was a supporter of the Victoria League, vice president of the New Zealand branch of the British Red Cross Society and the Lady Liverpool Fund, and was president of the Plunket Society. In the 1926 King's Birthday Honours, she became the first New Zealand woman to be appointed a Dame Grand Cross of the Order of the British Empire.

== Early years ==
Massey was born Christina Allan Paul in Forbes, New South Wales in 1863, the eldest of four children of Scottish immigrants Christina (née Allan) and Walter Paul, a miner. At the age of 19, she married William Ferguson Massey, who was farming nearby at Mangere.

== Death ==
Massey died in Wellington on 19 April 1932, aged 69. Two of her seven children had died in infancy. She was survived by two daughters and three sons, two of whom, Walter and John, were MPs. A third son, Frank George Massey (1887–1975), was active in local and New Zealand National Party political affairs, and won the DSO and Military Cross during the First World War, as a major in the British Army.
