= Winnifred Train =

New Zealand nurse

Winnifred Sarah Train OBE (14 February 1904 – 16 July 1979) was a notable New Zealand army and civilian nurse, hospital matron, and nurses' association leader. She was born in Waitotara, Wanganui, New Zealand, in 1904. Train was appointed an Officer of the Order of the British Empire in the 1965 New Year Honours.
