= Clarke Gayford =

New Zealand television presenter (born 1976)

- Gayford in 2025
- Born: Clarke Timothy Gayford; October 1976 (age 50)
- Occupation: Broadcaster
- Known for: Partner of the Prime Minister of New Zealand
- Spouse: Jacinda Ardern (m. 2024)
- Children: 1

Clarke Timothy Gayford (born October 1976) is a New Zealand television and radio broadcaster, presenter of the fishing documentary show Fish of the Day. He is the husband of Jacinda Ardern, who served as prime minister of New Zealand from October 2017 to January 2023.

== Early life, education and career ==
Gayford was born in October 1976 and grew up at a farm outside Gisborne. He is the eldest of three siblings. From the age of 11, he boarded at Palmerston North Boys' High School. In 1995, he matriculated at Otago University, Dunedin, to study for a Bachelor of Arts degree, before transferring to the New Zealand Broadcasting School in Christchurch. After he graduated from broadcasting school, Gayford successfully pitched student-life show Cow TV (1999) to Dunedin's Channel 9.

In 1999, Gayford appeared as a contestant on Treasure Island, a reality television game show. In 2003, he began broadcasting on the C4 music television channel, presenting youth programmes. In 2010, Gayford presented the third season of Extraordinary Kiwis, a biographical documentary series. Gayford also presented several radio shows, including morning and afternoon drive time shows on More FM and George FM, respectively.

In 2015, with producer Mike Bhana, Gayford created fishing show Fish of the Day, for Choice TV. The documentary series is also broadcast on National Geographic Channel, and has screened in over 35 countries. In 2021 Gayford hosted the television show Moving Houses. He made a guest appearance as himself in the first season 2 episode of Wellington Paranormal.

== Views and public image ==
In mid-April 2020 during the first year of COVID-19 pandemic, Gayford appeared on a short Wellington Paranormal video encouraging people who were looking after young children. In response, National Party Member of Parliament Brett Hudson expressed concerns during an Epidemic Response Committee meeting in early May 2020 that the video risked politicising the New Zealand Police. Police Commissioner Andrew Coster defended Gayford's presence on the grounds that he was a well-known television personality who had participated in the television series.

On 12 March 2021, Gayford attracted media attention when he posted a tweet stating that the New Zealand Cabinet had made an "in principle decision" pending final test results in relation to the lifting of a COVID-19 Alert Level 2 lockdown in Auckland. In response, his partner Prime Minister Ardern stated that Gayford had not been briefed on Cabinet's "preliminary decision" to move Auckland to Alert Level 1 that day.

Gayford said in a "scathing review" of an article written by former prime minister Sir John Key in September 2021: "It was such a shame that the name slinging [and] use of disinformation divided his contribution into partisan politics."

In mid-January 2022 amid COVID Deltacron variant surging in New Zealand, Gayford drew controversy after speaking to a pharmacist in December 2021 about obtaining rapid antigen testing for several musician friends. Gayford had claimed that there had been a change to testing guidance from New Zealand Health Ministry that would allow them to obtain rapid antigen testing instead of the more invasive polymerase chain reaction testing. Gayford was criticised by National Party's COVID-19 Response spokesperson Chris Bishop for allegedly using his position as the Prime Minister's partner to obtain special favours for his friends. Gayford subsequently apologised for "any issues or confusion" this created for pharmacy staff.

== Personal life ==
Gayford was previously in relationships with musician Hollie Smith and Shortland Street actress Shavaughn Ruakere.

Gayford and Jacinda Ardern began dating in 2013. In August 2017, Ardern was elected as the leader of Labour Party after the general election, and she became prime minister on 26 October of the same year. Gayford had been referred to as the spouse of the prime minister, although the couple were not married at the time. He accompanied Ardern on international visits, including the 2018 Commonwealth Heads of Government Meeting in London, UK.

On 19 January 2018, Ardern announced that she and Gayford were expecting their first child in June. Their daughter, Neve, was born on 21 June at 4:45 pm in Auckland City Hospital.

In May 2019, it was reported that he and Ardern were engaged to be married. The wedding, scheduled for early 2022, was postponed due to the highly transmissible COVID-19 Deltacron hybrid variant. On 8 May 2022, Gayford tested positive for COVID-19, for which he experienced "very mild" symptoms. As a result, he, Ardern, and their daughter went into self-isolation for seven days. On 14 May that year, Ardern and Neve both tested positive for virus, with both experiencing "very mild" symptoms. On 13 January 2024, Gayford and Ardern were married at a private ceremony.

Honorary titles
Preceded by Mary English	Partner of the Prime Minister of New Zealand; 2017–2023	Succeeded by Jade Hipkins
