= Motueka Borough Council =

Former borough of New Zealand

Motueka Borough
- Borough of New Zealand
- 1900–1989
- map of the borough in 1929
- Capital: Motueka
- Area
  - Coordinates: 41°07′24″S 173°00′53″E
- History
  - Established: 1900
  - Disestablished: October 31, 1989 1989
- Today part of: Tasman District Council

Motueka Borough Council was the local authority for the town of Motueka in New Zealand's South Island from 1900, when the town was awarded Borough status. The council existed until October 31, 1989. From November 1, 1989, Motueka became part of the new Tasman District, administered by the Tasman District Council, as part of the 1989 New Zealand local government reforms.

== History ==
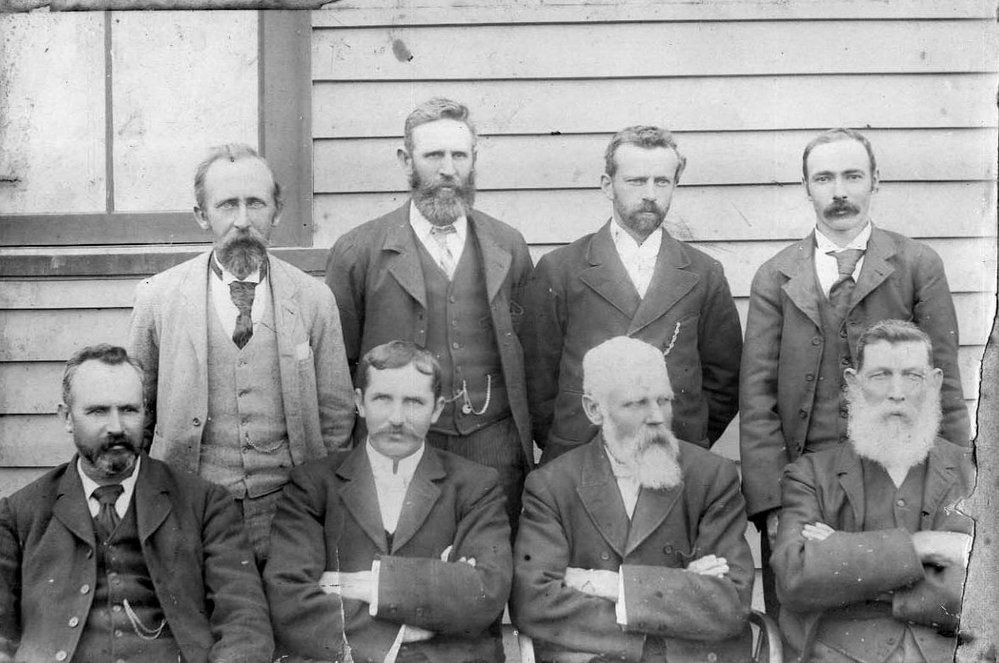
Motueka's first borough council in 1900. Back from left: Horatio Everett (town clerk), William Ryder Jr., Frederick William Thorp, Walter John Moffatt. Front: Michael Simpson, Robert William Hammond Rankin, Richmond Hursthouse (mayor), James Satherley.

Following the provincial government period, when the wider area was administered by the Nelson Provincial Council, the town of Motueka was governed by Waimea County and the Motueka Road Board from 1877. In the June 1899 meeting of the Motueka Road Board, the majority of the members expressed a desire to form a borough for the administration of Motueka. In its September 1899 meeting, the Waimea county councillors protested against the move of Motueka to become a borough. The protest was sent to the government, but the response was that the county council must organise a counter-petition signed at least as numerously as the petition for forming the borough. County councillors thought that they would not achieve that. By early December 1899, the government gazetted the Motueka Borough.

The poll for the mayoralty was held on 8 January 1900. Richmond Hursthouse had received a numerously signed petition to stand, but the less popular John Stuart Wratt chose to contest the election as Hursthouse had opposed the formation of the borough. Hursthouse won the poll with 141 votes to 57. A poll was held on 10 January 1900 for six borough councillors, which was contested by 13 candidates. All previous road board members stood for election except for the mayoral candidates. The borough council held its inaugural meeting on 17 January 1900.

Hursthouse retired at the April 1902 election as he was about to move to Taranaki.

Laura Ingram was the first woman elected to local government in the wider Nelson-Tasman region. In the 1944 local election, she was elected to the Motueka Borough Council. She served a single term.

=== List of mayors ===
The Motueka Borough Council was headed by a mayor from 1900 until 1989. The following is a complete list of officeholders:

†: Died in office

	Name	Term of office	Notes
1	Richmond Hursthouse	1900–1902	
2	Stuart Wratt	1902–1904	
3	Robert Rankin	1904†	
4	Frederick Thorp	1904–1911†	
5	Charles Lowe	1911–1912	
(2)	Stuart Wratt	1912†	
6	Michael Simpson	1912–1914	
7	Percy Moffatt	1914–1915	
(5)	Charles Lowe	1915–1916	
(6)	Michael Simpson	1916	
8	James Wallace	1916–1921	
9	James McGlashen	1921–1925	
10	Daniel Talbot	1925–1927	
(8)	James Wallace	1927–1929	
11	Sidney Clay	1929–1931	
12	Rupert York	1931–1940†	
13	Samuel Hulbert	1940–1941	
14	Walter Eginton	1941–1959	
15	Herbert Thomason	1959–1968	
16	Jack Krammer	1968–1974	
17	David Kennedy	1974–1983	
18	Claude Teece	1983–1989	

== See also ==
- List of former local authorities in New Zealand
