= Ann Chapman =

New Zealand limnologist

- Born: Margaret Ann Chapman; 14 January 1937; Dunedin, New Zealand
- Died: 23 May 2009 (aged 72); Hamilton, New Zealand
- Education: University of Otago (MSc); University of Glasgow (PhD)
- Scientific career
- Fields: Limnology
- Workplaces: University of Waikato
- Thesis: Ecological studies on the zooplankton of Loch Lomond

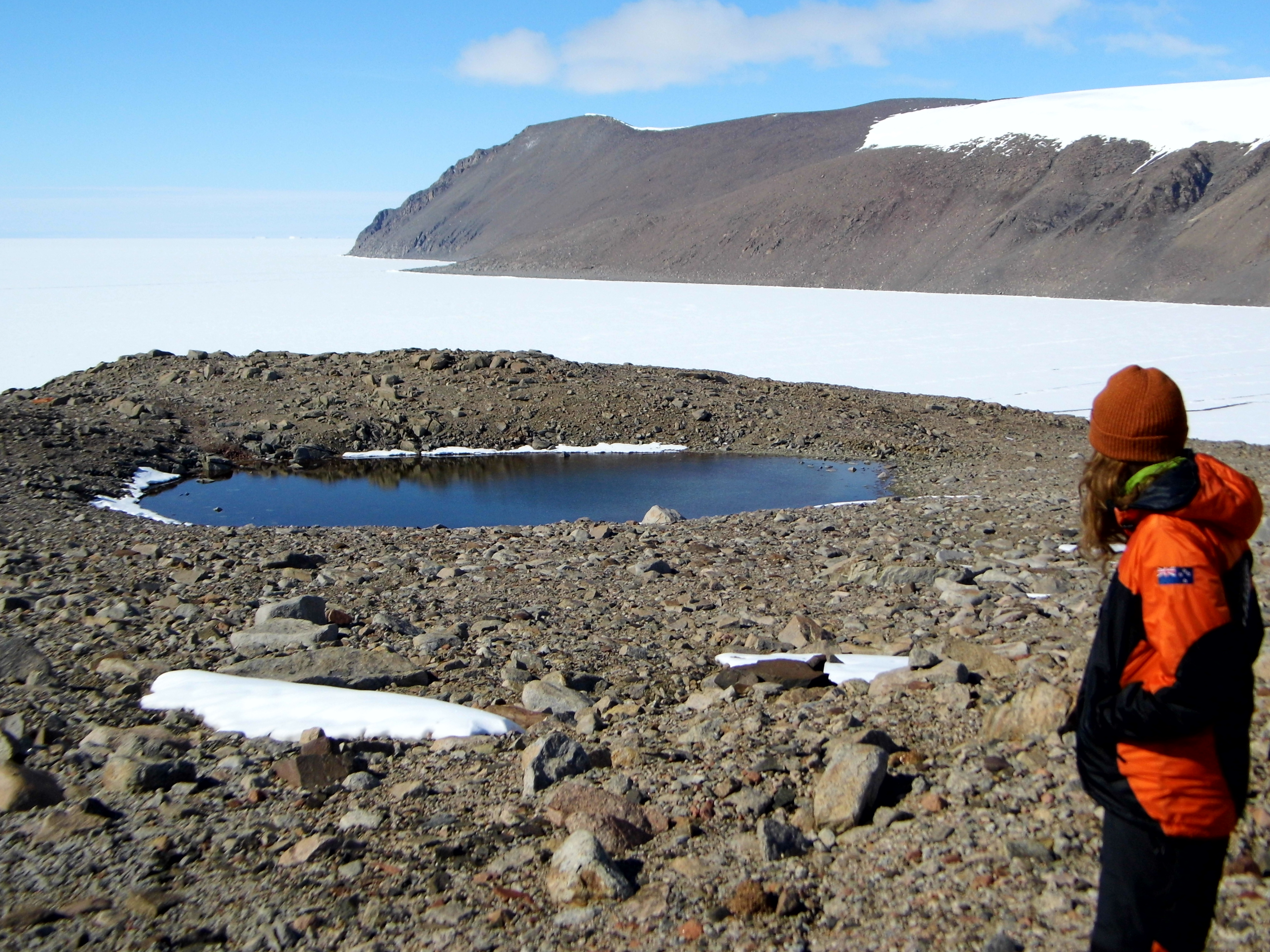
Lake Chapman in Antarctica, named in Chapman's honour

Margaret Ann Chapman (14 January 1937 – 23 May 2009) was a limnologist, one of the first New Zealand women scientists to visit Antarctica, and the first woman to lead a scientific expedition to Antarctica. Lake Chapman, in Antarctica's Ross Dependency, was named for Chapman. Chapman spent most of her teaching career at the University of Waikato.

== Early life and education ==
Chapman was born in Dunedin on 14 January 1937 and studied at Southland Girls' High School and Otago Girls' High School. She graduated with a Masters of Science at the University of Otago in 1960; her thesis was on the taxonomy and ecology of New Zealand freshwater ostracods. She worked at the Sydney Water Board in Australia before moving to Scotland to study toward a PhD at the University of Glasgow, which she completed in 1965. Her doctoral thesis was entitled Ecological studies on the zooplankton of Loch Lomond.

== Career ==
She worked at the University of Glasgow and the University of Auckland before being appointed as a senior lecturer at the University of Waikato in 1970 and promoted to Reader in 1975. She remained at the University of Waikato until her retirement in 1996.

In 1971, Chapman led a three-week scientific expedition to Antarctica, which made her one of the first women on the continent and the first woman to lead an Antarctic expedition. Lake Chapman, near Granite Harbour in Antarctica's Ross Sea Dependency, is named after Chapman.

Chapman and Vida Stout founded the New Zealand Limnological Society in 1967 (now the New Zealand Freshwater Sciences Society).

She co-authored the Guide to the freshwater Crustacea of New Zealand, published in 1976, with Maureen Lewis. An updated version was published in 2011, which Chapman had been working on prior to her death.

== Retirement ==
Following her 1996 retirement, a special conference session was held in her honour, which resulted in a special section in the New Zealand Journal of Marine and Freshwater Research published in 1999. In the foreword to the special issue, Chapman was recalled as being "very relaxed" with a "healthy disrespect for minor rules and regulations that bedevil large institutions, and willing to turn a blind eye to student pranks".

Chapman's final years were plagued with ill health, but she converted her nursing home room into an office and continued to write, including working on a draft of an updated version of the freshwater Crustacea guide. She died in Hamilton on 23 May 2009.

In 2017, Chapman was selected as one of the Royal Society Te Apārangi's "150 women in 150 words", celebrating the contributions of women to knowledge in New Zealand.
