= 1965 New Year Honours (New Zealand) =

Annual awards for New Zealanders

The 1965 New Year Honours in New Zealand were appointments by Elizabeth II on the advice of the New Zealand government to various orders and honours to reward and highlight good works by New Zealanders. The awards celebrated the passing of 1964 and the beginning of 1965, and were announced on 1 January 1965.

The recipients of honours are displayed here as they were styled before their new honour.

== Knight Bachelor ==
- Professor Edward George Sayers CMG MB FRCP – dean of the Medical Faculty, University of Otago.
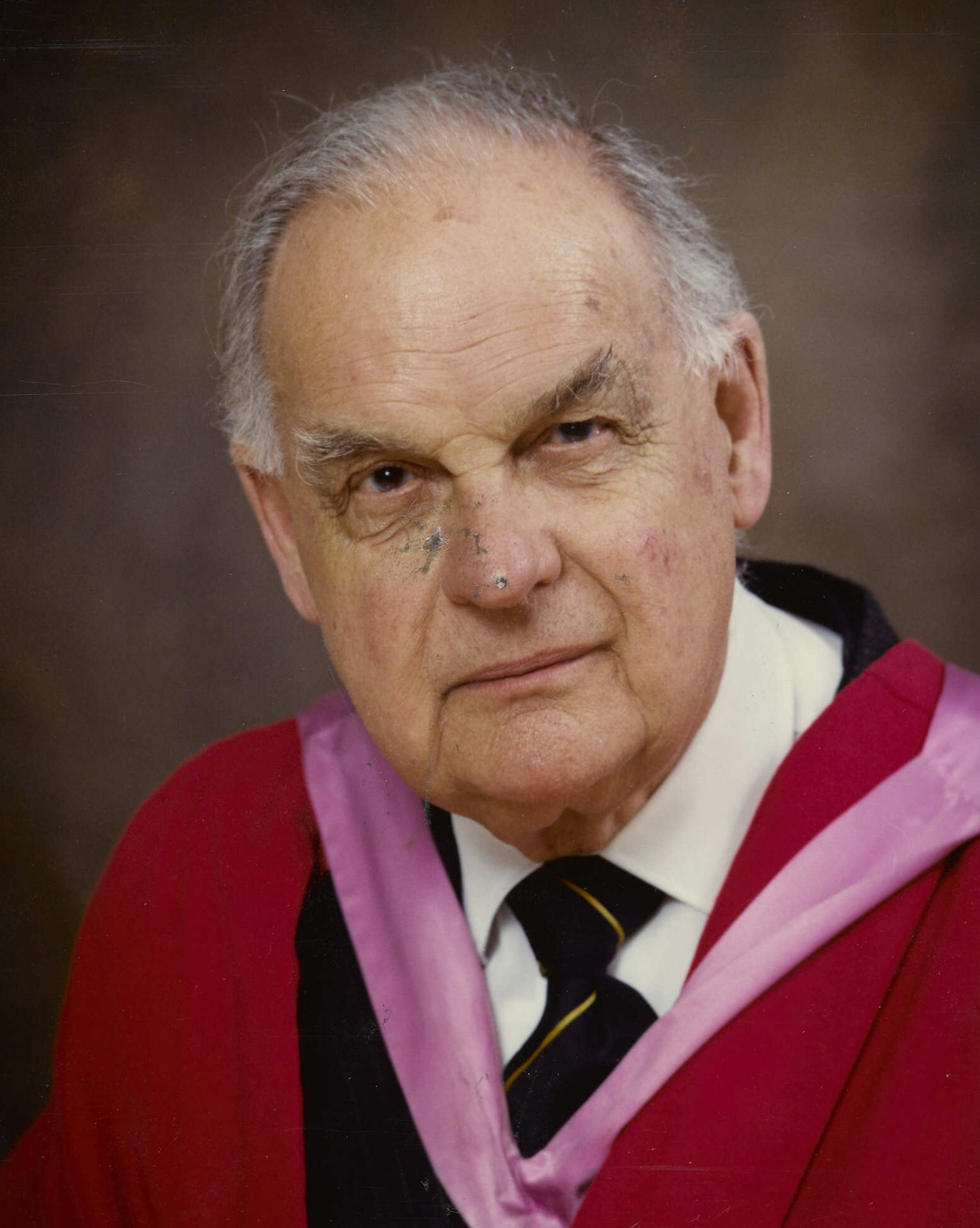
Sir Edward Sayers

== Order of the Bath ==
=== Companion (CB) ===
Military division

- Air Vice-Marshal Ian Gordon Morrison CBE – Royal New Zealand Air Force.

== Order of Saint Michael and Saint George ==
=== Companion (CMG) ===
- George Burns – of Christchurch. For services to journalism.
- John Thomson Gilkison – Commissioner of Works.

== Order of the British Empire ==
=== Knight Commander (KBE) ===
Civil division

- William Alfred Stevenson OBE JP – of Auckland. For services to the community.

=== Commander (CBE) ===
Civil division

- William Henry Cooper – of Auckland. For services to education.
- Percy Dowse JP – mayor of Hutt City.
- Alister Murray Linton – mayor of Rotorua.
- Ernest Richard Toop JP – of Wellington. For services to local government.

Military division

- Brigadier Robert Boyd Dawson DSO – New Zealand Regular Force.
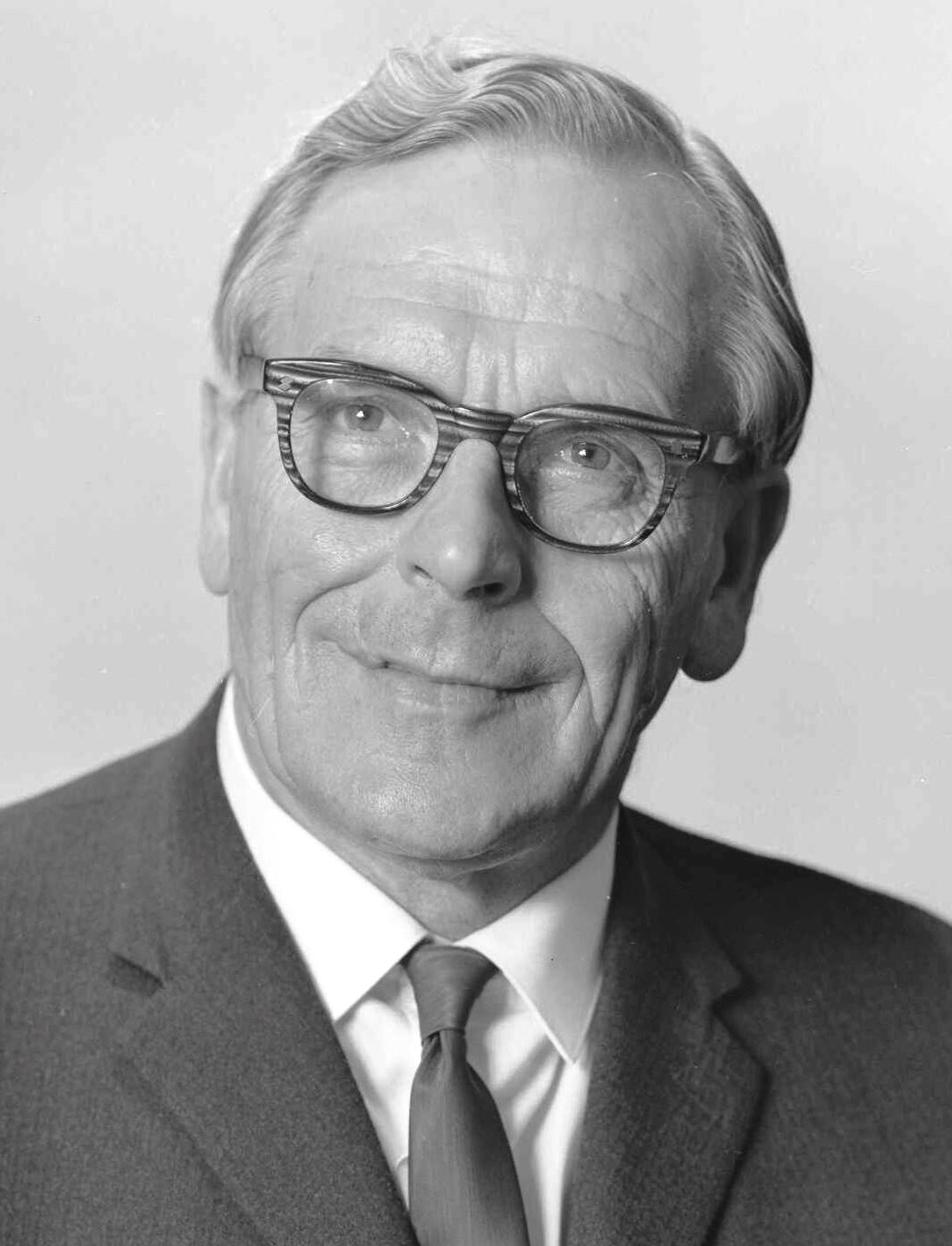
Percy Dowse

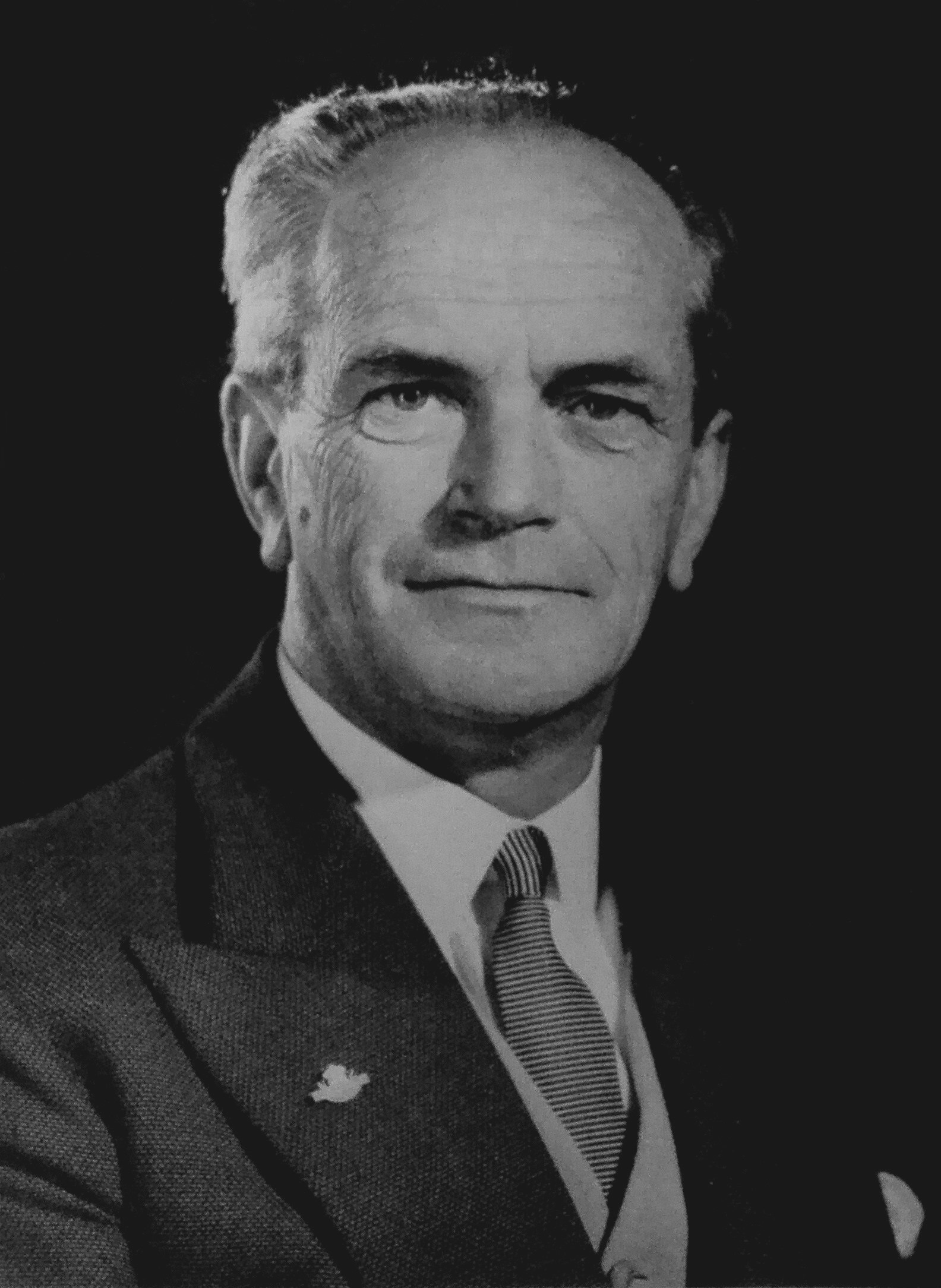
Ernest Toop

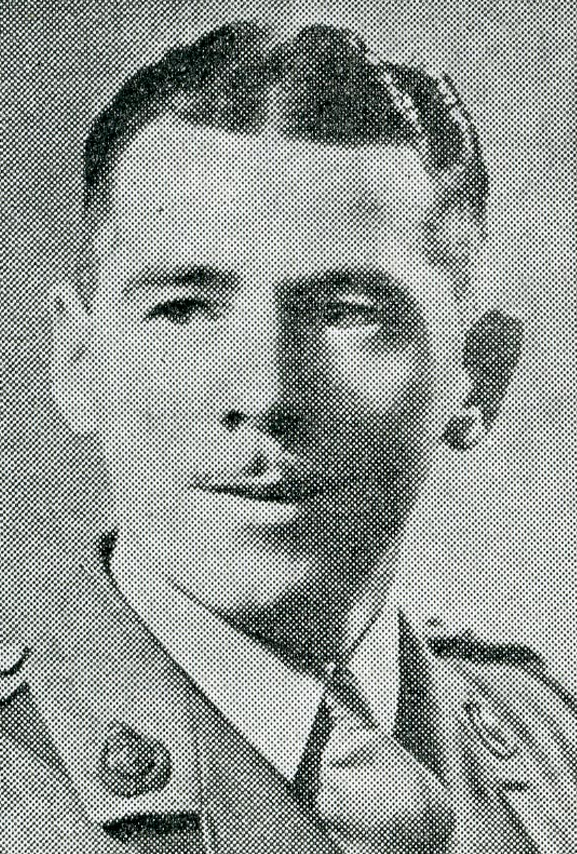
Robert Dawson

=== Officer (OBE) ===
Civil division

- Arthur Dudley Carson – director of the Fields and Marginal Lands Divisions, Department of Lands and Survey.
- Bertie Victor Cooksley MM – of Masterton. For services to the community.
- Donald Alexander Finlayson JP – of Northland. For services to the dairy industry.
- Alexander Kirkpatrick JP – of Hastings. For services to local government.
- Grant Raglan Milne – of Wellington. For services in the field of engineering, particularly as president of the New Zealand Institution of Engineers.
- Lawrence David Jose Nathan JP – of Auckland. For services to the community in the fields of philanthropy and local government.
- Robert Steele Pearson – superintendent of the Youth Centre, Prisons Department, Waikeria.
- Morton Sommerville Rennie – of Auckland. For services to agriculture.
- Peter George Snell MBE – of Auckland. For his outstanding achievement in the field of athletics.
- Winifred Sarah Train – lately matron, Palmerston North Public Hospital.
- Frederick Turnovsky – of Wellington. For services in the field of music.

Military division

- Commander John Malcolm Fielder VRD – Royal New Zealand Naval Volunteer Reserve.
- Lieutenant-Colonel Noel Rodney Ingle MVO ED – Royal New Zealand Corps of Signals (Regular Force).
- Wing Commander Melville Harry Scott Innes-Jones – Royal New Zealand Air Force.
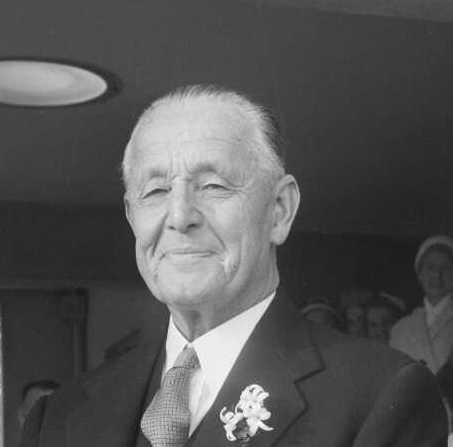
Bert Cooksley

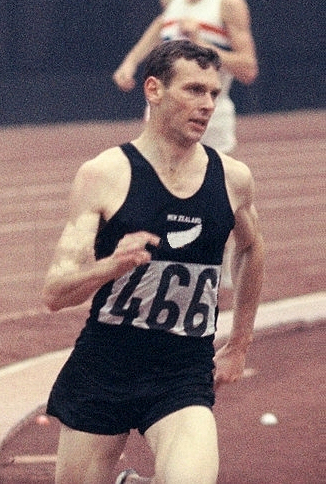
Peter Snell

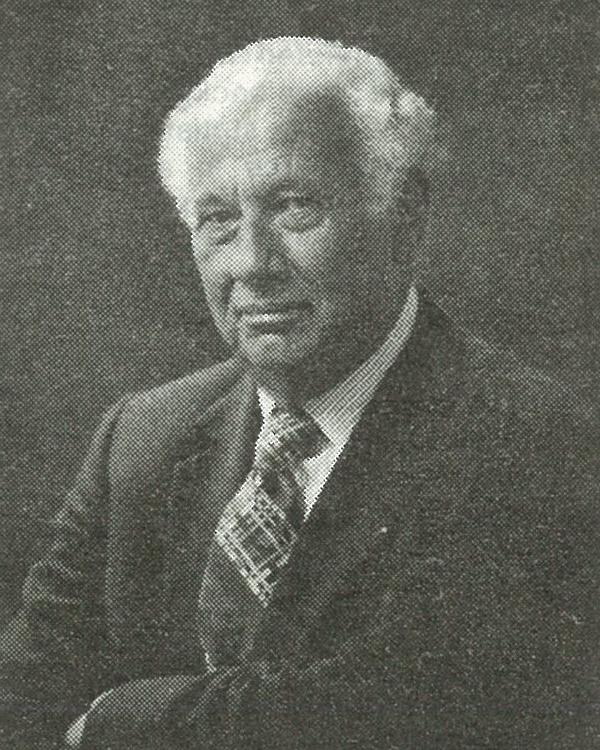
Frederick Turnovsky

=== Member (MBE) ===
Civil division

- Victor Maxwell Anderson – of Eketāhuna. For services to local government.
- Edward Stuart Bibby JP – of Waipawa. For services to the community.
- Ada Clark – of Auckland. For services to the Missions to Seamen Harbour Lights Guild.
- Cyril James Cox JP. For services to the community, especially as chairman of the Nelson Health Camp Committee.
- Leo Vernon Farthing JP – of Timaru. For services to local government and welfare organisations.
- Hubert Menary Hammond – of Hamilton. For services to local government and horticulture.
- David Livingstone Holmes JP. For community welfare services, especially as chairman of the Chatham Islands County Council.
- Bruce Hutchen – of Taranaki. For services to the community.
- Laura May Cook Ingram JP – of Motueka. For services in the fields of community welfare and local government.
- Herbert George Kemp JP – of Ashburton. For services to local government and the community.
- Mabel Mahinarangi Kewene – matron, Te Puia Springs Hospital, Gisborne.
- Thomas McKenzie JP – of Invercargill. For services to farming.
- Albert Henry Nees – of Blenheim. For services to local-body affairs.
- Edward Herbert Raymond JP – mayor of Te Puke Borough Council.
- William John Richards – mayor of Hokitika.
- Te Kiato Riwai BEM – of Christchurch. For services as a welfare officer to the Māori people.
- Martin Sydney Stanley Smith JP – deputy mayor of Wanganui.
- Ernest Wilfred Turner JP – of Auckland. For services to local government.

Military division

- Surgeon Lieutenant Commander Thomas Henry Logan – Royal New Zealand Navy.
- Warrant Officer Class I Jack Douglas Flowerday – Royal New Zealand Infantry Regiment (Regular Force).
- Major James Frederick Moodie MC ED MB ChB MRCP – Royal New Zealand Army Medical Corps (Regular Force).
- Squadron Leader Herbert Keele Horne – Royal New Zealand Air Force.
- Warrant Officer Laurie Alexander Anderson – Royal New Zealand Air Force.
- Warrant Officer Brian Elliott Nye – Royal New Zealand Air Force.

== British Empire Medal (BEM) ==
Civil division, for gallantry

- Andrew Robert McFarlane – constable, New Zealand Police. For arresting a mentally unbalanced man armed with a rifle.
- Donald Kinloch White – sergeant, New Zealand Police. For arresting a mentally unbalanced man armed with a rifle.

Civil division, for meritorious service

- James Gordon Mearns – station maintenance overseer, Ministry of Works Staff, Royal New Zealand Air Force Station Hobsonville.
- Hector Redvers Sear – chief guide, Waitomo Caves.
- Archibald Frederick Williams – group scoutmaster, 1st Karori Group.

Military division

- Chief Petty Officer Writer Frederick Cozens – Royal New Zealand Navy.
- Chief Petty Officer Electrician Michael John Patrick Headley – Royal New Zealand Navy.
- Chief Radio Electrical Artificer Peter George Saunders – Royal New Zealand Navy.
- Chief Petty Officer John Stokes – Royal New Zealand Navy.
- Sergeant John Lawrence Rogers Lydiate – Royal New Zealand Infantry Regiment (Territorial Force).
- Staff-Sergeant (temporary) John David Anson Wright – Royal New Zealand Artillery (Regular Force).
- Flight Sergeant Maurice Alan Conroy – Royal New Zealand Air Force.
- Flight Sergeant James Walter Findlay – Royal New Zealand Air Force.

== Royal Red Cross ==
=== Associate (ARRC) ===
- Matron Iris Frazer – Royal New Zealand Nursing Corps (Regular Force).

== Air Force Cross (AFC) ==
- Squadron Leader Edmund Chester Arundel – Royal New Zealand Air Force.
- Flight Lieutenant William Edmund Hugh Bromley – Royal New Zealand Air Force.

== Queen's Fire Services Medal (QFSM) ==
- Leslie Roy Joseph Osmond – chief fire officer, Christchurch Fire Brigade.
- Hector Edward Braggins – lately third officer, Masterton Fire Brigade.

== Queen's Police Medal (QPM) ==
- William Smith Craigie – assistant commissioner, New Zealand Police Force.
- Henry Mark Holmes – detective chief superintendent, New Zealand Police Force.

== Queen's Commendation for Valuable Service in the Air ==
- Flying Officer Gerald Ayre – Royal New Zealand Air Force.
