= Frederick Turnovsky =

New Zealand manufacturer, entrepreneur, advocate and community leader (1916–1994)

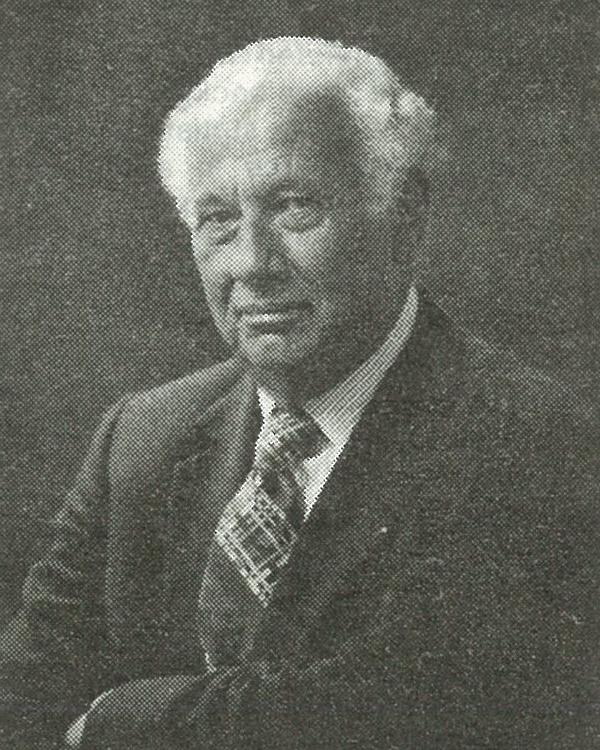
Turnovsky, c. 1984

Frederick Turnovsky ONZ OBE (28 December 1916 – 12 December 1994) was a New Zealand manufacturer, entrepreneur, advocate and community leader. He was born in Prague, Bohemia in 1916.

== Early life ==
Turnovsky was the second son of Max Turnovsky and Caroline Weiser. Max was a jeweller and of Jewish ethnicity. Turnovsky was bilingual in Czech and German and attended a German-speaking school. At school he also learnt English and French. His interest in music began when he was seven and attended his first opera.

At 16, while a school a Realgymnasium pupil, Turnovsky joined the youth wing of the German-speaking section of the Social Democratic Party. He was elected to executive positions in the party and was prominent in the unsuccessful efforts to persuade leading France and Britain to intervene against Hitler. In March 1939, he fled to London after being advised that the Gestapo were after him.

== New Zealand ==
On 27 June 1939, he married Liselotte Felicitas Wodaková at Hampstead and in December 1939 they left for Wellington, New Zealand. Arriving in January 1940 Turnovsky undertook casual employment. Founding the Tatra Leather Goods Company he manufactured and sold watch straps. The success of this venture led to a number of successful manufacturing ventures. Turnovsky was thought to be the first resident New Zealander to become a member of Lloyd's, the British insurance underwriters.

Tatra was one of the largest makers of soft leather goods in Australasia by the mid 1960s and received a government Export Award in 1966. Turnovsky represented the New Zealand Manufacturers Federation at the National Development Conference (1968–69) and was its president (1972–73 and 1979–80). He was appointed to the Manufacturing Development Council, was a member of trade missions to Pacific states (1971) and China (1973). He led a delegation of manufacturers to Canberra (1973), and was honorary consul for Mexico (1973–81).

Because of his Social-Democrat beliefs, as chairman of the Development Finance Corporation from 1973 to 1976, he gave weight to social objectives as well as sound business procedures in the corporation's funding of new business ventures.

== Arts ==
Turnovsky helped establish the Wellington Chamber Music Society and was its chair from 1950 to 1954. He was vice president of the Federation of Chamber Music Societies (1950–53) and president (1953–60). In 1953 he was a founding member of the New Zealand Opera Company, and was chairman of its board from 1959 to 1969.

He was also a founding member of the Arts Advisory Council in 1960, becoming deputy chairman of its successor, the Queen Elizabeth II Arts Council of New Zealand, from 1970 to 1973. In 1962 Turnovsky was appointed to the cultural sub-commission of the New Zealand National Commission for UNESCO. He was a member of the national commission (1963–88) and its chairman (1974–78). He was a member of UNESCO's executive board (1978–83).

He was a trustee of the New Zealand International Festival of the Arts, and a member of the project development board of the Museum of New Zealand Te Papa Tongarewa. In 1984 he set up the Turnovsky Endowment Trust to recognise and encourage outstanding achievement in the arts.

For services to the arts, Fred Turnovsky was appointed an Officer of the Order of the British Empire in the 1965 New Year Honours, and was a foundation member of the Order of New Zealand in 1988. The young Czech patriot had become one of the most eminent New Zealanders of his generation.

== Honours ==
In the 1965 New Year Honours, Turnovsky was appointed an Officer of the Order of the British Empire, for services in the field of music. On 6 February 1988, Turnovsky was the tenth appointee to the Order of New Zealand.

== Death ==
Turnovsky died on 12 December 1994 in Wellington, survived by his wife, and their son and daughter. His ashes were buried at Karori Cemetery.

== Autobiography ==
- Turnovsky: Fifty Years in New Zealand. Allen & Unwin, 1990. ISBN 9780046582623
