= Norma Holyoake =

New Zealand vice-regal consort, wife of Keith Jacka Holyoake

Dame Norma Holyoake DCMG QSO CStJ
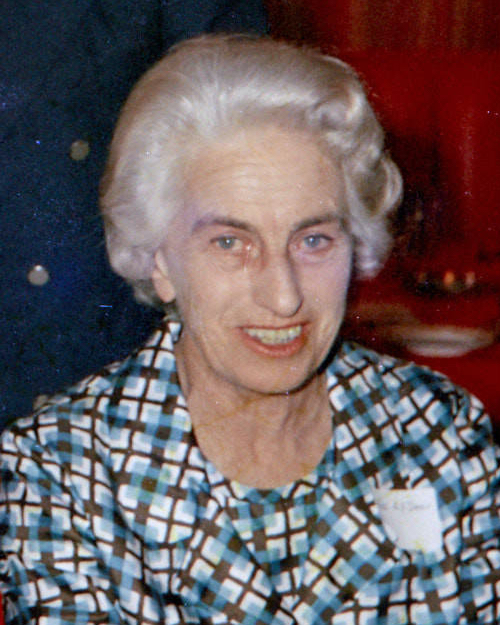
- Holyoake in 1971

Viceregal consort of New Zealand
- In role 26 October 1977 – 25 October 1980
- Preceded by: June Blundell
- Succeeded by: Norma Beattie

Spouse of the Prime Minister of New Zealand
- In role 12 December 1960 – 7 February 1972
- Preceded by: Lotty Nash
- Succeeded by: Margaret Marshall
- In role 20 September 1957 – 12 December 1957
- Preceded by: Florence Holland
- Succeeded by: Lotty Nash

Spouse of the Deputy Prime Minister of New Zealand
- In role 13 December 1949 – 20 September 1957
- Preceded by: Role created
- Succeeded by: Margaret Marshall

Personal details
- Born: Norma Janet Ingram; 7 March 1909
- Died: 18 December 1984 (aged 75)
- Spouse: Keith Holyoake (m. 1934; died 1983)
- Children: 5
- Relatives: Laura Ingram (sister); Ken Comber (son-in-law)

Dame Norma Janet Holyoake DCMG QSO CStJ (née Ingram; 7 March 1909 – 18 December 1984) was a New Zealand community leader. She was the spouse of Keith Holyoake, who served as prime minister in 1957 and from 1960 to 1972. She was viceregal consort between 1977 and 1980 during her husband's term as governor-general.

== Biography ==
Norma Janet Ingram was born on 7 March 1909. Her sister was Laura Ingram.

She twice married Keith Holyoake: first in a civil ceremony on 24 September 1934, and again on 11 January 1935 at their Presbyterian church in Motueka. The couple had five children: two sons and three daughters.

She died on 18 December 1984, aged 75.

== Honours and awards ==
In 1977, Holyoake was awarded the Queen Elizabeth II Silver Jubilee Medal. The same year, she was made a Commander of the Order of St John. In the 1980 Queen's Birthday Honours, she was appointed a Dame Commander of the Order of St Michael and St George, for public services since 1935. Later that year, in a special honours list on her husband's leaving the office of governor-general, she was made a Companion of the Queen's Service Order for community service.

Honorary titles
New title	Spouse of the Deputy Prime Minister of New Zealand; 1949–1957	Succeeded by Margaret Marshall
Preceded by Florence Holland	Spouse of the Prime Minister of New Zealand; 1957; 1960–1972	Succeeded by Lotty Nash
Preceded by Lotty Nash	Spouse of the Prime Minister of New Zealand; 1957; 1960–1972	Succeeded by Margaret Marshall
Preceded by June Blundell	Viceregal consort of New Zealand; 1977–1980	Succeeded by Norma Beattie
