= Te Kiato Riwai =

Te Kiato Riwai MBE BEM (1912–1967) was a New Zealand nurse and māori welfare officer. Of Māori descent, she identified with the Ngāi Tahu iwi. She was born in the Chatham Islands, New Zealand, in 1912.

In the 1965 New Year Honours, Riwai was appointed a Member of the Order of the British Empire, for services as a welfare officer to the Māori people.
