= Duncan Stout =

New Zealand medic, soldier, and author

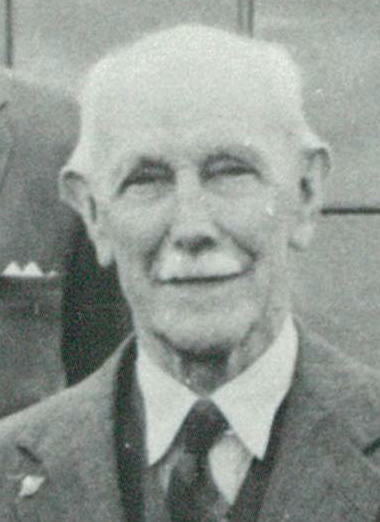
Stout in 1962

Sir Thomas Duncan MacGregor Stout CBE DSO ED (25 July 1885 – 27 February 1979) was a New Zealand medic, soldier and author.

== Biography ==
Born in Wellington in 1885, he was the son of Anna Stout, a suffragist, and Robert Stout, who was the Premier of New Zealand at the time. He was educated at Wellington College and then studied medicine at Guy's Hospital, University of London. He was conferred LRCP in 1910 and received a ChM in 1914.

He married Agnes Isobel Pearce MBE, who served as an ambulance driver at Brockenhurst Hospital in Hampshire during the First World War, at St Paul's in Wellington on 4 December 1919. The couple had four children: Squadron Leader Robert Edward Stout; Arthur Duncan Stout; John David Stout (whose legacy funds the Stout Centre); and Vida Stout.

He saw service in both World War I and World War II with the New Zealand Expeditionary Force (NZEF). He later wrote three volumes relating to the medical services of the NZEF in World War II for New Zealand's official history. He was the first chancellor of Victoria University of Wellington after the dis-establishment of the University of New Zealand into its constituent colleges.

He remained in his post until his retirement in 1966.

Stout died in 1979 and his ashes were buried in Karori Cemetery.

== Honours and awards ==
Stout was appointed a Companion of the Distinguished Service Order in 1917, and in 1919 he was made an Officer of the Order of the British Empire, for valuable services rendered in connection with the war. In 1935, he was awarded the King George V Silver Jubilee Medal. He was promoted to Commander of the Order of the British Empire in 1943, in recognition of gallant and distinguished services in the Middle East between May and October 1942. In 1953, Stout was awarded the Queen Elizabeth II Coronation Medal, and in the 1962 New Year Honours he was appointed a Knight Bachelor, for services to medicine and education.

Stout was conferred with an honorary LLD by the University of New Zealand in 1961.

== Works ==
- Medical Services in New Zealand and The Pacific
- New Zealand Medical Services in Middle East and Italy
- War Surgery and Medicine
