= Laura Ingram =

New Zealand teacher and community leader (1912–1994)

Laura Ingram MBE
- Born: Laura May Cook Ingram; 11 June 1912; Murchison, New Zealand
- Died: 6 December 1994 (aged 82); Motueka, New Zealand
- Education: Christchurch Teachers' College
- Occupations: Schoolteacher; local politician; community leader
- Relatives: Norma Holyoake (sister); Keith Holyoake (brother-in-law)

Laura May Cook Ingram MBE (11 June 1912 – 6 December 1994) was a New Zealand teacher and community leader.

Born in Murchison on 11 June 1912, Ingram grew up in Riwaka. Her sister Norma married Riwaka local Keith Holyoake who would later become prime minister.

Ingram was the first woman elected to local government in the wider Nelson-Tasman region. In the 1944 local election, she was elected to the Motueka Borough Council. She served a single term and was subsequently a member of the Nelson Hospital Board for a total of 28 years.

In the 1965 New Year Honours, Ingram was appointed a Member of the Order of the British Empire, for services in the fields of community welfare and local government.
