= Spouse of the prime minister of New Zealand =

Spouse of the Prime Minister of New Zealand
- Incumbent; Amanda Luxon since 27 November 2023
- Residence: Premier House
- Inaugural holder: Elizabeth Kittoe
- Formation: 7 May 1856

The wife or husband of the prime minister of New Zealand holds no official office and, as such, is not given a salary or official duties, but the prime minister's spouse may be expected to act as hostess or host of Premier House. The current prime minister, Christopher Luxon, is married to Amanda Luxon.

When Henry Sewell became the country's first premier in 1856, his wife, Elizabeth Kittoe, became the first person to fill the role. The first husband to the prime minister was Burton Shipley, Jenny Shipley's husband, in 1997. The 23rd prime minister, Michael Joseph Savage, was a bachelor during his term, and Prime Minister Jacinda Ardern was in an unmarried relationship with Clarke Gayford during her tenure from 2017 to 2023.

== Current ==
The current spouse of the prime minister of New Zealand is Amanda Luxon, as her husband became prime minister on 27 November 2023.

== Role ==
The prime minister's spouse has no official duties. Some earlier spouses stayed mainly at home and took little part in public life.

However, most recent prime ministers' spouses have been involved in charities or community organisations, working to raise public awareness, funds, and support for a range of causes. They generally assist their partners in political campaigns, and participate in official duties that come with the position, such as hosting foreign dignitaries, and, in particular, entertaining the spouses of dignitaries; accompanying the prime minister on national and international trips; and attending conferences and functions. They have attended the opening of Parliament; hosted visitors at Premier House; visited Buckingham Palace, the White House, or the Japanese Imperial Palace; and been present at royal coronations and conferences.

== Official recognition ==
Some prime ministers' spouses have received official recognition for their services to the community with a damehood:

- Dame Christina Massey, GBE
- Dame Norma Holyoake, DCMG QSO
- Dame Ruth Kirk, DBE
- Dame Thea Muldoon, DBE QSO

Muldoon was the first spouse of a prime minister to be provided with an official secretary for dealing with her correspondence.

== List of spouses ==
No.	Portrait	Spouse (Maiden name)	Tenure	Length of tenure	Prime Minister
1		Elizabeth Sewell (née Kittoe) – 1880 (aged 61)	7 May 1856 – 20 May 1856	13 days	Sewell m. 1850
2		Sarah Fox (née Halcomb) – 23 June 1892 (aged 76)	20 May 1856 – 2 June 1856	13 days	Fox m. 1842
3		Emily Stafford (née Charlotte); February 1827 – 18 April 1857 (aged 30)	2 June 1856 – 18 April 1857†	320 days	Stafford m. 1846
	Vacant		18 April 1857 – 5 December 1859	2 years, 231 days	Stafford; Widower
4		Mary Stafford (née Bartley); 1835 – 1899 (aged 64)	5 December 1859 – 12 July 1861	1 year, 219 days	Stafford m. 1859
(2)		Sarah Fox (née Halcomb); 1816 – 23 June 1892 (aged 76)	12 July 1861 – 6 August 1862	1 year, 25 days	Fox m. 1842
5		Mary Domett (née George) unknown – 1887 (aged unknown)	6 August 1862 – 30 October 1863	1 year, 85 days	Domett m. 1856
6		Jane Augusta Whitaker (née Griffith); 1822 – 3 September 1884 (aged 62)	30 October 1863 – 24 November 1864	1 year, 25 days	Whitaker m. 1843
7		Filumena Mary Anne Weld (née Lisle Phillipps) c. 1828 – 1903 (around aged 75)	24 November 1864 – 16 October 1865	326 days	Weld m. 1859
(4)		Mary Stafford (née Bartley); 1835 – 1899 (aged 64)	16 October 1865 – 28 June 1869	3 years, 255 days	Stafford m. 1859
(2)		Sarah Fox (née Halcomb); 1816 – 23 June 1892 (aged 76)	28 June 1869 – 10 September 1872	3 years, 74 days	Fox m. 1842
(4)		Mary Stafford (née Bartley); 1835 – 1899 (aged 64)	10 September 1872 – 11 October 1872	31 days	Stafford m. 1859
8		Lydia Waterhouse (née Giles); 1827 – 25 January 1910 (aged 83)	11 October 1872 – 3 March 1873	143 days	Waterhouse m. 1848
(2)		Sarah Fox (née Halcomb); 1816 – 23 June 1892 (aged 76)	3 March 1873 – 8 April 1873	36 days	Fox m. 1842
9		Mary Vogel (née Clayton); 18 February 1849 – 12 August 1933 (aged 84)	8 April 1873 – 6 July 1875	2 years, 89 days	Vogel m. 1867
10		Jane Pollen (née Henderson); 1828 – 1903 (aged 74–75)	6 July 1875 – 15 February 1876	224 days	Pollen m. 1846
(9)		Mary Vogel (née Clayton); 18 February 1849 – 12 August 1933 (aged 84)	15 February 1876 – 1 September 1876	199 days	Vogel m. 1867
11		Ann Elizabeth Atkinson (née Smith); 1838 – 1919 (aged 80–81)	1 September 1876 – 13 October 1877	1 year, 42 days	Atkinson m. 1867
12	Portrait of Eliza Grey	Elizabeth Lucy "Eliza" Grey (née Spencer); 1823 – 4 September 1898 (aged 74–75)	13 October 1877 – 8 October 1879	1 year, 360 days	Grey m. 1839
13		Rose Anne Hall (née Dryden); 22 December 1828 – 12 May 1900 (aged 71)	8 October 1879 – 21 April 1882	2 years, 195 days	Hall m. 1861
(6)		Jane Augusta Whitaker (née Griffith); 1822 – 3 September 1884 (aged 62)	21 April 1882 – 25 September 1883	1 year, 157 days	Whitaker m. 1843
(11)		Ann Elizabeth Atkinson (née Smith); 1838 – 1919 (aged 80–81)	25 September 1883 – 16 August 1884	326 days	Atkinson m. 1867
14	Portrait of Anna Stout	Anna Paterson Stout (née Logan); 29 September 1858 – 10 May 1931 (aged 72)	16 August 1884 – 28 August 1884	12 days	Stout m. 1876
(11)		Ann Elizabeth Atkinson (née Smith); 1838 – 1919 (aged 80–81)	28 August 1884 – 3 September 1884	6 days	Atkinson m. 1867
(14)	Portrait of Anna Stout	Anna Paterson Stout (née Logan); 29 September 1858 – 10 May 1931 (aged 72)	3 September 1884 – 8 October 1887	3 years, 35 days	Stout m. 1876
(11)		Ann Elizabeth Atkinson (née Smith); 1838 – 1919 (aged 80–81)	8 October 1887 – 24 January 1891	3 years, 108 days	Atkinson m. 1867
15		Ellen Ballance (née Anderson); 1846 – 14 June 1935 (aged 88–89)	24 January 1891 – 27 April 1893	2 years, 93 days	Ballance m. 1870
16		Louisa Jane Seddon (née Spotswood); 28 May 1851 – 9 July 1931 (aged 80)	27 April 1893 – 10 June 1906	13 years, 44 days	Seddon m. 1869
17		Rosalind Lucy Hall-Jones (née Purss); 30 May 1858 – 13 October 1942 (aged 84)	10 June 1906 – 6 August 1906	57 days	Hall-Jones m. 1877
18		Theresa Dorothea Ward (née de Smidt); 1866 – 1927 (aged 60–61)	6 August 1906 – 28 March 1912	5 years, 235 days	Ward m. 1883
19		Ida Henrietta Mackenzie (née Nantes); 23 December 1850 – 28 April 1926 (aged 75)	28 March 1912 – 10 July 1912	104 days	Mackenzie m. 1884
20		Dame Christina Allan Massey (née Paul); 11 January 1863 – 19 April 1932 (aged 69)	10 July 1912 – 10 May 1925	12 years, 304 days	Massey m. 1882
21		Caroline Bell (née Robinson); 1853 – 8 September 1935 (aged 81–82)	10 May 1925 – 30 May 1925	20 days	Bell m. 1878
22		Marguerite Grace "Marjorie" Coates (née Coles); 3 October 1892 – 1973 (aged 80–81)	30 May 1925 – 10 December 1928	3 years, 194 days	Coates m. 1914
	Vacant		10 December 1928 – 28 May 1930	1 year, 169 days	Ward; Widower
23		Emma Serena Forbes (née Gee); 20 August 1877 – 9 February 1961 (aged 83)	28 May 1930 – 6 December 1935	5 years, 192 days	Forbes m. 1898
	Vacant		6 December 1935 – 27 March 1940	4 years, 112 days	Savage; Bachelor
24	Portrait of Janet Fraser	Janet Fraser (née Munro, formerly Kemp); 31 January 1883 – 7 March 1945 (aged 62)	27 March 1940 – 7 March 1945†	4 years, 345 days	Fraser m. 1919
	Vacant		7 March 1945 – 13 December 1949	4 years, 281 days	Fraser; Widower
25		Florence Beatrice Holland (née Drayton); 26 October 1894 – 1976 (aged 81–82)	13 December 1949 – 20 September 1957	7 years, 281 days	Holland m. 1920
26		Dame Norma Janet Holyoake (née Ingram); 7 March 1909 – 18 December 1984 (aged 75)	20 September 1957 – 12 December 1957	83 days	Holyoake m. 1934
27		Lottie May "Lotty" Nash (née Eaton); 17 March 1880 – 12 December 1961 (aged 81)	12 December 1957 – 12 December 1960	3 years, 0 days	Nash m. 1906
(26)		Dame Norma Janet Holyoake (née Ingram); 7 March 1909 – 18 December 1984 (aged 75)	12 December 1960 – 7 February 1972	11 years, 57 days	Holyoake m. 1934
28		Jessie Margaret Marshall (née Livingston); 17 January 1917 – 2004 (aged 86–87)	7 February 1972 – 8 December 1972	305 days	Marshall m. 1944
29		Dame Lucy Ruth Kirk (née Miller); 28 April 1922 – 20 March 2000 (aged 77)	8 December 1972 – 31 August 1974	1 year, 266 days	Kirk m. 1943
		Irene Frances Watt (née Ray); 8 February 1918 – 30 April 2013 (aged 95)	31 August 1974 – 6 September 1974	6 days	Watt m. 1968; Acting
30		Glen Elna Rowling (née Reeves); 1 August 1930 – 23 June 2024 (aged 94)	6 September 1974 – 12 December 1975	1 year, 97 days	Rowling m. 1951
31	Portrait of Thea Muldoon	Dame Thea Dale Muldoon (née Flyger); 13 March 1927 – 24 February 2015 (aged 87)	12 December 1975 – 26 July 1984	8 years, 227 days	Muldoon m. 1951
32		Naomi Joy Lange (née Crampton) bef. 1950 (aged at least 75–76)	26 July 1984 – 8 August 1989	5 years, 13 days	Lange m. 1968
33	Portrait of Margaret Palmer	Margaret Palmer (née Hinchcliff) bef. 1947 (aged at least 78–79)	8 August 1989 – 4 September 1990	1 year, 27 days	Palmer m. 1963
34		Yvonne Moore (née Dereany) bef. 1957 (aged at least 68–69)	4 September 1990 – 2 November 1990	59 days	Moore m. 1975
35		Joan Bolger (née Riddell) bef. 1945 (aged at least 80–81)	2 November 1990 – 8 December 1997	7 years, 36 days	Bolger m. 1963
36		Burton Shipley bef. 1954 (aged at least 71–72)	8 December 1997 – 10 December 1999	2 years, 2 days	Shipley m. 1972
37	Portrait of Peter Davis	Peter Byard Davis; 25 April 1947 (aged 79)	10 December 1999 – 19 November 2008	8 years, 345 days	Clark m. 1981
38	Portrait of Bronagh Key	Bronagh Key (née Dougan); 14 November 1963 (aged 63)	19 November 2008 – 12 December 2016	8 years, 23 days	Key m. 1984
39		Mary English (née Scanlon) c. 1962 (aged 63–64)	12 December 2016 – 26 October 2017	318 days	English m. unknown
40	Portrait of Clarke Gayford	Clarke Gayford^{α} partner 24 October 1976 (aged 49)	26 October 2017 – 25 January 2023	5 years, 91 days	Ardern m. 2024
41		Jade Hipkins ^{β}	25 January 2023 – 27 November 2023	306 days	Hipkins m. 2020
42		Amanda Luxon (née Rae)	27 November 2023 – Present	2 years, 356 days*	Luxon m. 1994

^α Domestic partner; engaged since May 2019.

^β While remaining married, Chris and Jade Hipkins separated in 2022.

* Incumbent's length of tenure last updated: 17 November 2026.

== See also ==
- First Lady
- Spouse of the governor-general of New Zealand
