= Thea Muldoon =

Wife of New Zealand prime minister (1927–2015)

Dame Thea Muldoon DBE QSO
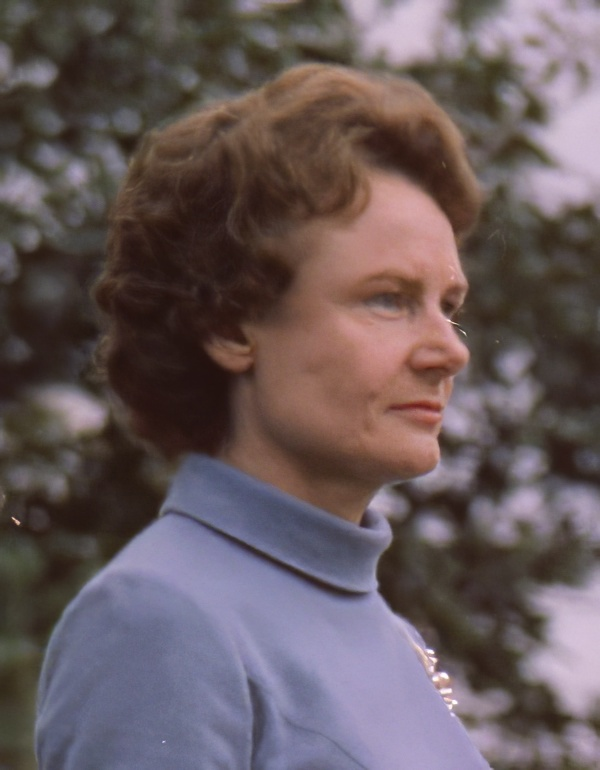
- Thea Muldoon in 1977

Spouse of the Prime Minister of New Zealand
- In role 12 December 1975 – 26 July 1984
- Prime Minister: Robert Muldoon
- Preceded by: Glen Rowling
- Succeeded by: Naomi Joy Lange

Personal details
- Born: Thea Dale Flyger; 13 March 1927 Huntly, New Zealand
- Died: 24 February 2015 (aged 87) Auckland, New Zealand
- Spouse: Robert Muldoon (m. 1951; died 1992)
- Children: 3
- Known for: Community service, wife of prime minister

Dame Thea Dale Muldoon, Lady Muldoon DBE QSO (née Flyger; 13 March 1927 – 24 February 2015) was the wife of Robert Muldoon, who was the prime minister of New Zealand from 1975 to 1984. She was also known for her community service.

== Early life and family ==
Born at Pukemiro near Huntly in 1927, Thea Dale Flyger was the second child of Annie Eveleen (née Rainbow) and Stanley Arthur Flyger, an engineer, surveyor and builder. She was educated at Belmont Primary School and Takapuna Grammar School on Auckland's North Shore. Raised as an Anglican, she had a strict upbringing and taught Sunday School at St Michael's Church in Bayswater.

After leaving school, she worked at a public accounting firm and took night classes in accountancy at Seddon Memorial Technical College. She later worked at Holeproof Ltd in the costing office.

== Junior National Party and marriage ==
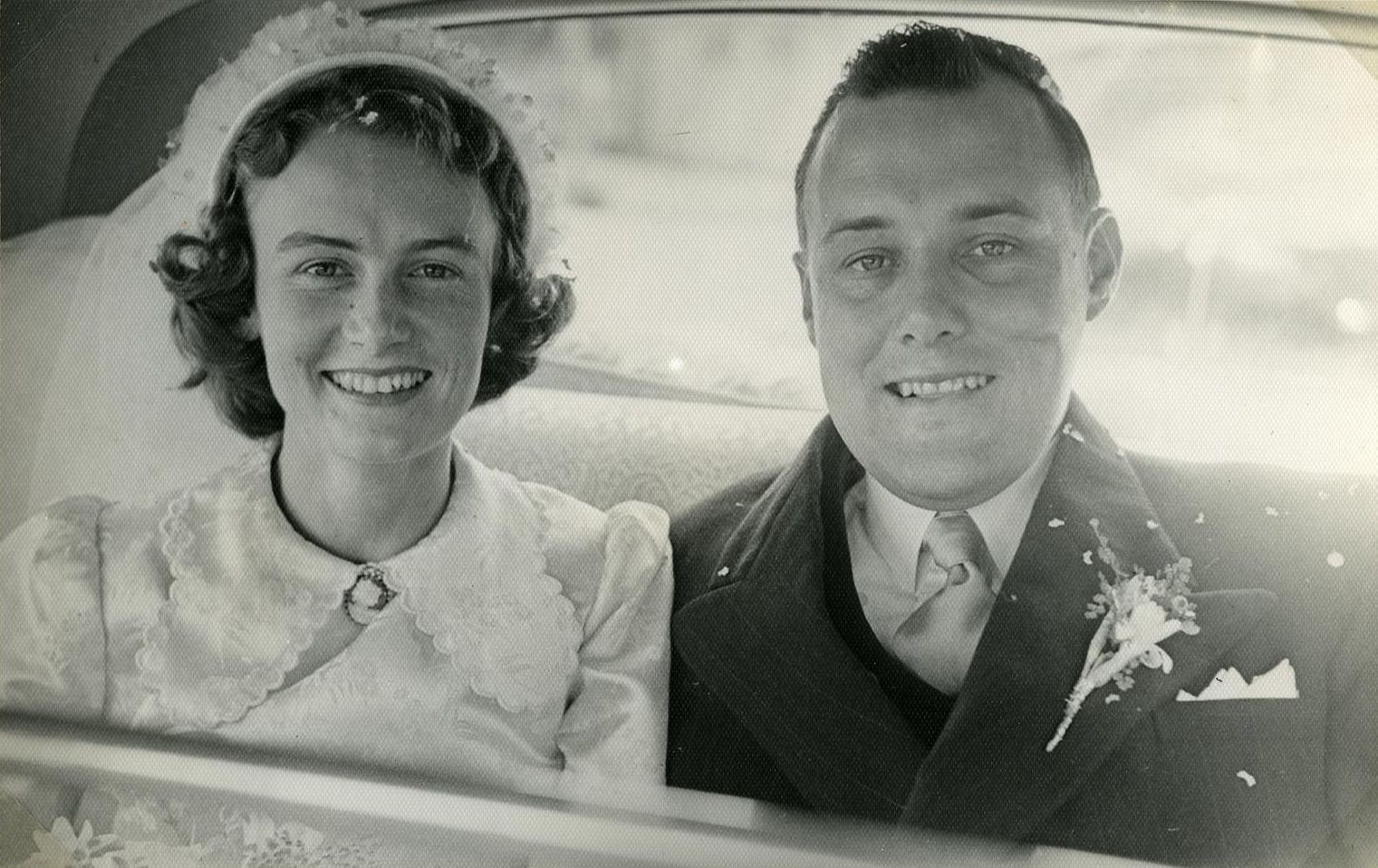
The Muldoons on their wedding day

Muldoon attended both National and Labour Party meetings with her father, and joined the Junior National Party mostly for social reasons. She met her future husband, Robert Muldoon, at a seminar on voluntary unionism in 1947 and they began going out together the following March. From 1947 she served as the North Shore representative on the Divisional Junior Education and Political Committee. The couple were married at Holy Trinity Church, Devonport on 17 March 1951, and had three children between December of that year and 1956.

During her husband's term as prime minister from 1975 to 1984, Muldoon took an active role in civic affairs, regularly speaking at functions, opening buildings and visiting the sick and infirm. She was the first wife of a New Zealand prime minister to have a full-time secretary. Robert Muldoon died in 1992, aged 70.

== Honours ==
Her husband was appointed Knight Grand Cross of the Order of St Michael and St George (GCMG) in the 1984 New Year Honours, and she was thus styled Lady Muldoon. She was made a Companion of the Queen's Service Order for community service in the 1986 New Year Honours. In the 1993 New Year Honours, a few months after her husband's death, she was appointed a Dame Commander of the Order of the British Empire, for services to the community.

== Later life ==
After her husband's death, Muldoon continued to contribute to community affairs. She served as patron of the Variety Artists Club of New Zealand, Hospice New Zealand, and the Auckland Lily Society, and founding patron of Hospice North Shore.

Muldoon died in Auckland on 24 February 2015, aged 87.
