= 1980 Special Honours (New Zealand) =

Awards list for New Zealand

The 1980 Special Honours in New Zealand were two Special Honours Lists, published on 1 August and 24 October, respectively, in which New Zealand's incoming and outgoing governors-general and the outgoing vice-regal consort were honoured.

== Order of Saint Michael and Saint George ==
=== Knight Grand Cross (GCMG) ===
- The Honourable David Stuart Beattie – Governor-General (designate) of New Zealand.
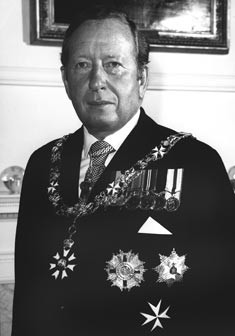
Sir David Beattie

=== Companion of the Queen's Service Order (QSO) ===
For community service

- Her Excellency Dame Norma Janet Holyoake DCMG.
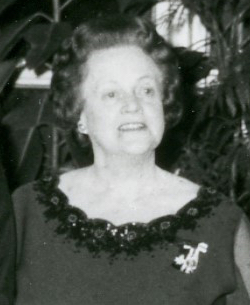
Dame Norma Holyoake

For public services

- His Excellency The Right Honourable Sir Keith Jacka Holyoake KG GCMG CH – Principal Companion of the Queen's Service Order and Governor-General and Commander-in-Chief in and over New Zealand since 1977.
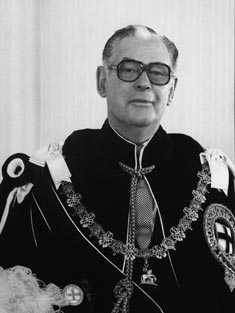
Sir Keith Holyoake
