= June Blundell =

June, Lady Blundell ONZ QSO GCStJ
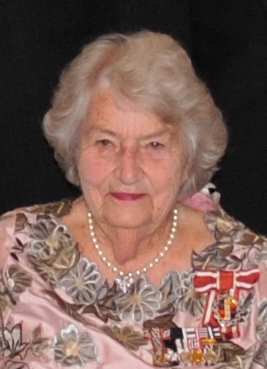
- Blundell in 2011

Viceregal consort of New Zealand
- In office 27 September 1972 – 5 October 1977
- Preceded by: Kathleen, Lady Porritt
- Succeeded by: Dame Norma Holyoake

Personal details
- Born: June Daphne Halligan; 19 June 1922
- Died: 31 October 2012 (aged 90) Auckland, New Zealand
- Spouse: Sir Denis Blundell (m. 1945; died 1984)

June Daphne, Lady Blundell ONZ QSO GCStJ (née Halligan, 19 June 1922 – 31 October 2012) was the wife of Sir Denis Blundell, former Governor-General of New Zealand. She was known in her own right for her extensive community activism and welfare work.

== Biography ==
Lady Blundell was active on behalf of the Order of St John as Vice-Patron and later Patron of the St John Northern Region Branch and had a devoted interest in St John Youth. In 1972 Lady Blundell was appointed Commander of the Order of Saint John (CStJ), in 1988 promoted to Dame of Justice of the Order of Saint John (DStJ) and in 2004 promoted to Dame Grand Cross of the Order of Saint John (GCStJ). In 1977, she was awarded the Queen Elizabeth II Silver Jubilee Medal. At the end of Sir Denis's term of office as Governor-General of New Zealand Lady Blundell was recognised for her service to New Zealand on 1 November 1977 and appointed a Companion of the Queen's Service Order for community service. On 6 February 1988 Lady Blundell was the sixth appointee to the Order of New Zealand. In 1990, she was awarded the New Zealand 1990 Commemoration Medal.

== Activism ==
She was heavily involved in the Cancer Foundation of New Zealand for many years. She was the founding Patron of the Child Cancer Foundation, contributed to the instigation of CanTeen, was active with the Homai College for the Blind, Save the Children New Zealand and the Asthma Society of New Zealand.

== Family ==
June and Denis Blundell married in 1945. They had a son and a daughter. Denis Blundell died in Townsville, Queensland, Australia, in 1984. Lady Blundell died on 31 October 2012 aged 90 at Auckland Hospital following a brief illness.

== Honours ==
- : Order of New Zealand (ONZ)
- : Queen's Service Order (QSO)
- : Venerable Order of Saint John (GCStJ)
