= Anna Stout =

Social reformer in New Zealand (1858–1931)

Anna, Lady Stout
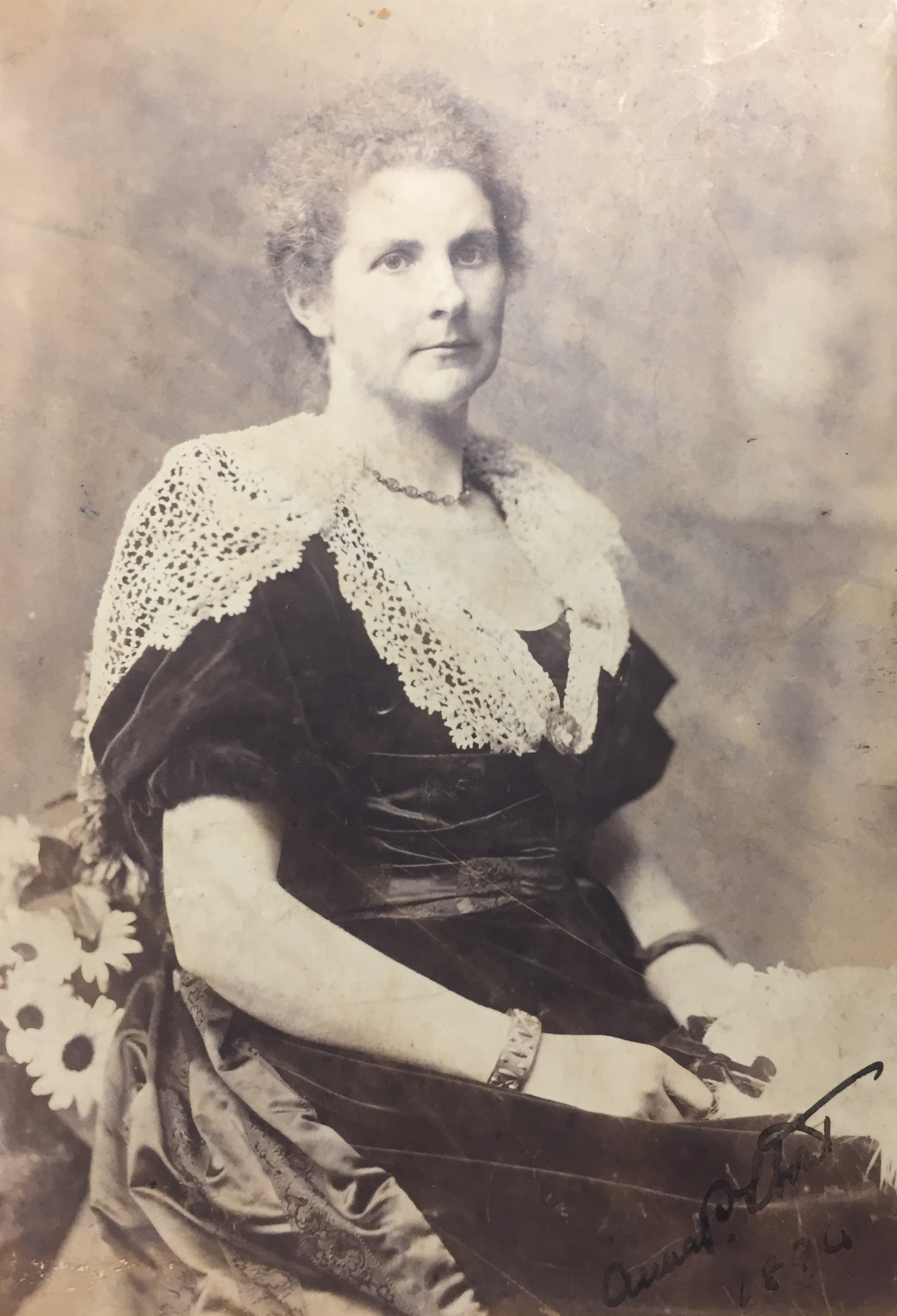
- Stout in 1894

Spouse of the Prime Minister of New Zealand
- In role 16 August 1884 – 28 August 1884
- Prime Minister: Robert Stout
- Preceded by: Annie Atkinson
- Succeeded by: Annie Atkinson
- In role 3 September 1884 – 8 October 1887
- Prime Minister: Robert Stout
- Preceded by: Annie Atkinson
- Succeeded by: Annie Atkinson

Personal details
- Born: Anna Paterson Logan; 29 September 1858 Dunedin, New Zealand
- Died: 10 May 1931 (aged 72) Hanmer Springs, New Zealand
- Resting place: Karori Cemetery, Wellington, New Zealand
- Spouse: Robert Stout
- Children: 6, including Duncan
- Known for: Social reform and feminism

Anna Paterson Stout, Lady Stout (née Logan; 29 September 1858 – 10 May 1931) was a feminist social reformer campaigning for equal rights and education for women in both New Zealand and Great Britain. She was a founding member of the Women's Christian Temperance Movement in New Zealand, the National Council of Women of New Zealand and helped found the New Zealand Society for the Protection of Women and Children as well as playing a part in the British Suffragette movement.

== Early life ==
Anna Paterson Stout was born in Dunedin, New Zealand in 1858 to immigrant Scottish Presbyterian parents, Jessie Alexander Pollock and her husband, John Logan, a clerk to the superintendent of the Otago Province. Her parents were active in campaigning for social reform, notably in the temperance and freethought movements, which had a life-long influence upon Stout.

From the age of 12 Stout was educated at the Girls' Provincial School, studying under Margaret Gordon Burn. Upon finishing her formal education, Stout lived with her parents in Dunedin, until her marriage in December 1876. At the age of 18 she married Robert Stout, a 32-year-old barrister and member of the New Zealand House of Representatives. Robert, a fellow Scot, was well known to the family and had been a frequent visitor, discussing freethought and the problems of the world with the Logans. She accompanied Robert to Wellington for the 1877 Parliamentary session. He became Attorney-General in March 1878.

Robert's political career and legal practice did not progress smoothly, and the Stouts spent several years moving between Dunedin and Wellington. Between 1878 and 1894 Stout gave birth to six children, four sons and two daughters. One of their children, Sir Thomas Duncan MacGregor Stout, followed in his father's footsteps as a promoter of education. He was the first chancellor of Victoria University of Wellington and received a knighthood for his services to medicine and education.

With Robert's knighthood in May 1886, she became Anna, Lady Stout.

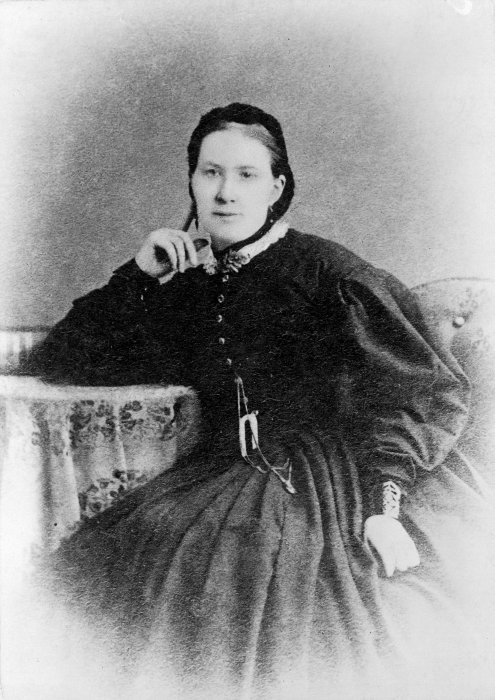
Anna, Lady Stout c. 1888

== Political activism ==
Stout was an activist, feminist and social reformer. Central to her social and political philosophy was the view that women should have equal rights with men and be free to develop their intellectual abilities to its fullest potential. She was a strong proponent of expanding women's higher education, with concern for the education of Māori women in particular. Throughout her life she worked to educate women politically and campaigned to give them equal pay and equal legal rights with men.

Stout and her husband shared many social and political views, often working together through a broad network of social reformers and politicians. In Dunedin they were close colleagues of Harriet Russell Morison, and through the temperance movement with Sir William Fox, and also Julius Vogel. Robert was the lawyer for local MP William Larnach.

Stout's role as the wife of the Premier, and later Chief Justice, made her a public figure, which afforded her access to the leading personalities of her day such as Richard Seddon, George Grey, John Ballance, William Pember Reeves, Margaret Sievwright, Lord and Lady Ranfurly, Lord and Lady Liverpool, even Dr. Truby King and Dr. Duncan Macgregor.

Stout was a founding member of the New Zealand branch of the Women's Christian Temperance Union New Zealand in 1885, however it was not until the 1890s that she played a more prominent public role.

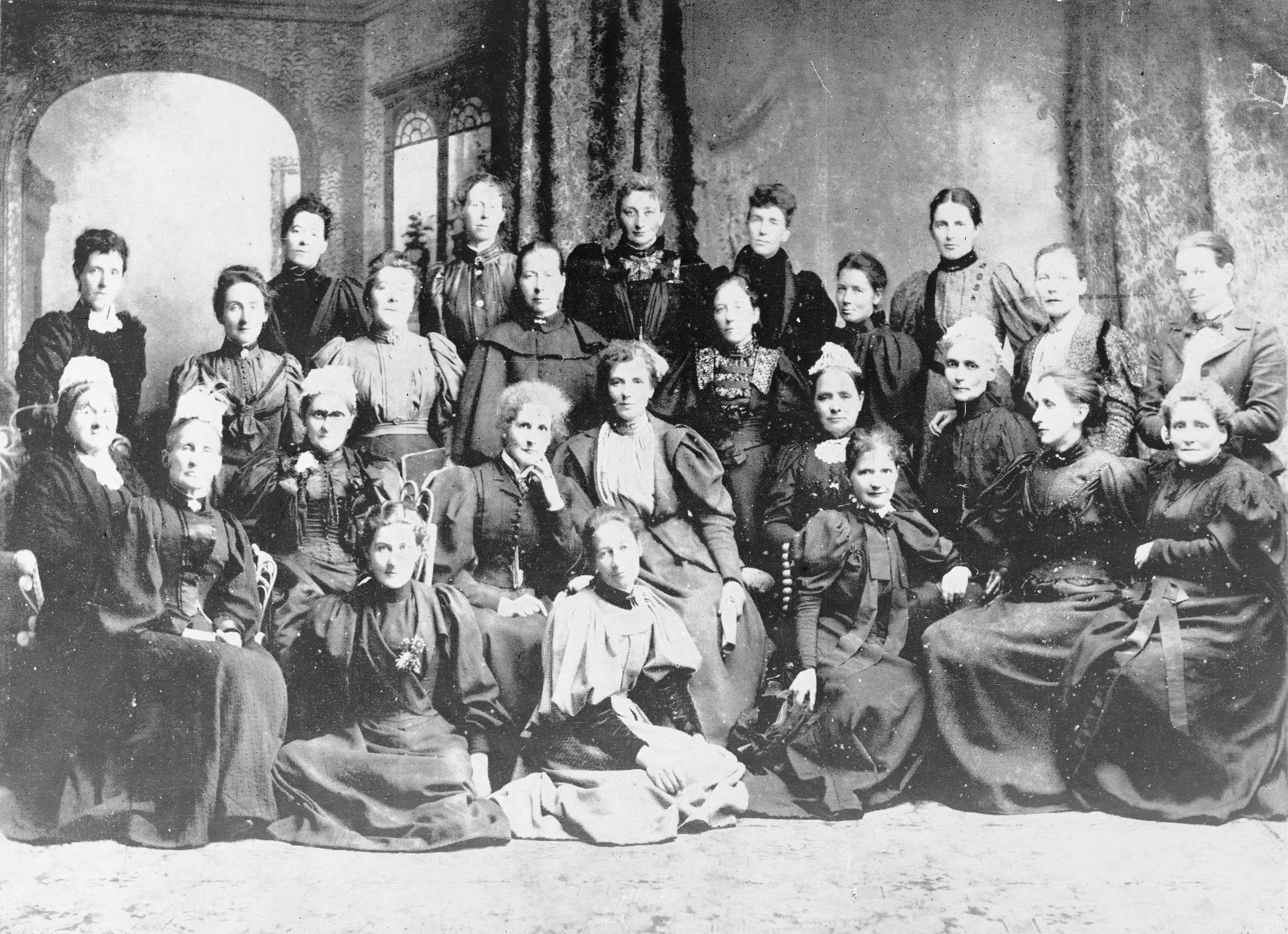
Stout with the National Council of Women of New Zealand in Christchurch, 1896

In April 1892, Stout was elected president of the Women's Franchise League in Dunedin and was a founding member of the National Council of Women of New Zealand, which was established at a Christchurch convention in 1896. She became a vice president with Kate Sheppard as president. The society aimed at educating women politically, promoting their independence and equality, and improving the living conditions of women who worked for wages.

The following year she had a public dispute with the council over the venue of the annual convention and did not attend, although scheduled to present a paper on the responsibilities of parents. With this defection Stout weakened her links to the main body of politically active women.

Stout supported the social purity movement, popular among women reformers in England and America as well as New Zealand. The movement sought to abolish prostitution and other sexual activities that were considered immoral according to Christian morality. Stout also helped to found the Wellington branch of the New Zealand Society for the Protection of Women and Children in 1897.

Upon settling in Wellington in 1895, Stout played a prominent role in Wellingtonian social circles, with her social gatherings often reported in the newspapers. She used her position and connections to influence political behaviour on behalf of women.

=== England ===
In April 1909 Stout and her husband Robert took their children to England. While Robert returned to New Zealand in 1910, Stout remained in England, where her children were studying. In England, Stout was freed from the constraints of her New Zealand role, while still enjoying its status.

While in England between 1909 and 1912 she became involved in the British suffrage movement, establishing close ties with the Pankhurst family and other feminist leaders. She aligned herself with the Women's Social and Political Union (WSPU), the militant wing of British suffragism founded by Emmeline and Christabel Pankhurst in 1903.

As a New Zealander and 'possessor of the vote', the WSPU used Stout to their advantage. Stout worked to assure anti-suffragists that voting rights for women in New Zealand had not led to the collapse of society. One of her key responsibilities was writing replies to The Times' anti-suffrage correspondents. Anna's articles appeared in Votes for Women and the Englishwoman and were republished as leaflets and pamphlets by several suffrage associations.

Stout participated in public demonstrations, marching through the streets behind WSPU banners. In 1910 Stout led a New Zealand contingent in a mass demonstration in London's Hyde Park, where she took to a platform to speak. Stout also addressed drawing room meetings of upper class women in England and Scotland about the suffrage campaign.

=== Later years ===
On her return to Wellington, at the age of 54, Stout settled into the role of a prominent club woman, taking part in various clubs and societies. She participated in the English-Speaking Union, the Wellington Pioneer Club, the Wellington Lyceum Club, the Wellington Women's Club, and, during the First World war, the Women's National Reserve of New Zealand. In 1917 she was involved in the revival of the National Council of Women and after the war became a member of the League of Nations Union of New Zealand.

In her later years Stout occasionally engaged in public debates over the role of women. In 1917 she opposed proposals to emphasize domestic training in the education of girls and wrote to the Evening Post in support of higher education for women.

In 1918, Stout led a protest campaign against a police raid on a Wellington house and the subsequent trial of five women for allegedly running a brothel. She contended that putting the women on trial while the men involved went free constituted a double standard. In 1922, during a wave of concern over the incidence of venereal disease and fearing the reintroduction of compulsory medical examination of women suspected of prostitution, Stout published a pamphlet opposing medical authorities who were demanding compulsory notification of the venereal diseases.

== Death ==
Ill throughout the 1920s, Stout become less and less active. Robert died on 19 July 1930, and she died of a cerebral haemorrhage less than a year later, on 10 May 1931 at Queen Mary Hospital, Hanmer Springs, aged 72. Her ashes are buried at Karori Cemetery.
