= Henry Blundell (publisher) =

New Zealand newspaper proprietor

Henry Blundell (1813 – 15 June 1878), New Zealand newspaper founder, proprietor and publisher, "a man with two or three crafts at his fingers' ends", was born in Dublin, Ireland. He brought his six children to Australia in 1860 and, moving permanently to New Zealand in 1863, began publishing the Wellington evening daily newspaper The Evening Post on 8 February 1865.

Henry Blundell had worked 27 years for the Dublin Evening Mail when as manager of the business he resigned following a disagreement over the treatment of staff. From Dublin he went first to Melbourne in Victoria, Australia, then deciding to try the then better-established South Island of New Zealand, left his family in Melbourne and spent 1861–2 with the established Lyttelton Times as assistant-manager and then, having fetched his children from Melbourne, Otago Daily Times in 1863 before joining in the following year a new newspaper venture among "the glittering prospects of a well-paying goldfield" but Havelock's promising Wakamarina goldfield began to run out.

Henry's final move was to New Zealand's new national capital city, Wellington. An Australian panel of three commissioners each an appointee of the governors of New South Wales, Victoria and Tasmania, designated Wellington the seat of government for its central location and sheltered harbour and their decision took effect in February 1865. With his partner from Havelock, David Curle, who left the partnership that July, Henry and his three sons printed with a hand-operated press and distributed Wellington's first daily newspaper, The Evening Post, on 8 February, parliament officially sat in Wellington for the first time on 26 July 1865.

With the benefit of long experience in a capital city, Henry Blundell pursued an independent and politically liberal policy. He was initially both manager and editor, while also assisting with other functions and, at first, writing the newspaper's editorials. He was described as a genial and kindly man.

Nine years later Henry retired, beginning by paying a visit to his native Ireland, leaving his newspaper in the hands of the three Blundell brothers; John (1841–1922), Henry (1844–1894), and Louis (1849–1934). Thereafter he travelled regularly between Wellington, Melbourne and Sydney though he remained based in Wellington.

Henry died aged 65, 15 June 1878, while on holiday in Sydney NSW Australia, and was interred at Wellington's Bolton Street Cemetery, and his grave is part of the memorial trail.

His great-grandson Sir Denis Blundell served as New Zealand's Governor-General from 1972 to 1977.

== Posterity ==
The six children of Henry Blundell and his wife née Margaret McGowan were born between 1841 and 1852.

- John
- Ellen, Mrs John Stevenson
- Thomas Henry
- Margaret McGowan, Mrs Nicholas Marchant
- Louis Proctor
- Caroline Amelia, Mrs John Marshall
