= Glen Rowling =

New Zealand community leader and spouse of prime minister Bill Rowling

Glen, Lady Rowling QSO

Spouse of the Prime Minister of New Zealand
- In role 6 September 1974 – 12 December 1975
- Prime Minister: Bill Rowling
- Preceded by: Irene Frances Watt
- Succeeded by: Thea Dale Muldoon

Personal details
- Born: Glen Elna Reeves; 1 August 1930
- Died: 23 June 2024 (aged 93) Nelson, New Zealand
- Spouse: Bill Rowling (m. 1951; died 1995)
- Children: 5
- Known for: Community service, wife of prime minister

Glen Elna Rowling, Lady Rowling QSO (née Reeves; 1 August 1930 – 23 June 2024) was a New Zealand community leader and the spouse of the prime minister of New Zealand Bill Rowling.

On 20 October 1951, she married Bill Rowling. They had five children.

In 1977, Rowling received the Queen Elizabeth II Silver Jubilee Medal. In the 1988 Queen's Birthday Honours, she was appointed a Companion of the Queen's Service Order for community service.

Glen, Lady Rowling, died in Nelson on 23 June 2024, aged 93.
