= Denis Blundell =

New Zealand lawyer and cricketer (1907–1984)

Sir Denis Blundell GCMG GCVO KBE QSO
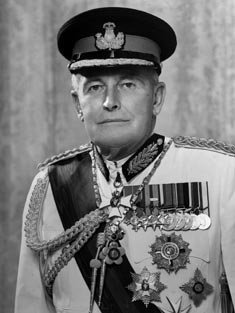

12th Governor-General of New Zealand
- In office 27 September 1972 – 5 October 1977
- Monarch: Elizabeth II
- Prime Minister: Jack Marshall; Norman Kirk; Hugh Watt (Acting); Bill Rowling; Robert Muldoon
- Preceded by: The Lord Porritt
- Succeeded by: Sir Keith Holyoake

Personal details
- Born: 29 May 1907 Wellington, New Zealand
- Died: 24 September 1984 (aged 77) Townsville, Queensland, Australia
- Spouse: June Daphne Halligan (m. 1945)
- Relatives: Henry Blundell (great-grandfather)
- Profession: Lawyer, diplomat

Military service
- Allegiance: New Zealand
- Branch/service: 2nd New Zealand Expeditionary Force
- Years of service: 1939–1944
- Rank: Lieutenant Colonel
- Commands: 23rd Battalion
- Battles/wars: Second World War; North African campaign; Italian campaign
- Awards: Officer of the Order of the British Empire

Sir Edward Denis Blundell GCMG GCVO KBE QSO (29 May 1907 – 24 September 1984) was a New Zealand lawyer, cricketer and diplomat who served as the 12th Governor-General of New Zealand from 1972 to 1977.

== Early life and family ==
Denis Blundell was born in Wellington to Henry Percy Fabian Blundell, who was grandson of Henry Blundell, founder of The Evening Post and scion of the ancient Lancashire family.

Blundell attended Waitaki Boys' High School and Trinity College, Cambridge. There he read Law and was called to the Bar of England and Wales in 1929. He never practised in the United Kingdom, however, and returned to New Zealand in 1930, practising as barrister and solicitor in Wellington. He was a partner in the Wellington law firm of Bell Gully from 1936 to 1968.

During the Second World War, Blundell served in the 2nd New Zealand Expeditionary Force from 1939 to 1944. He fought in North Africa and Italy, was brigade major of the 5th Infantry Brigade from 1943 to 1944, briefly commanded the 23rd Battalion with the rank of lieutenant colonel in 1944, and was appointed an Officer of the Order of the British Empire.

Blundell was President of the Wellington District Law Society in 1951, President of the New Zealand Law Society for six years (1962–1968) and vice-president of the Law Society of Asia and the Pacific in 1966. He was awarded the Queen Elizabeth II Coronation Medal in 1953, and knighted as a Knight Commander of the Order of the British Empire in the 1967 Queen's Birthday Honours, for services to the legal profession.

He married June Halligan in 1945. They had a son and a daughter.

== Cricket career ==
Blundell was a talented cricketer, and opened the bowling in first-class cricket for Cambridge University, MCC and Wellington. In 1928, in his first first-class match for Cambridge, he took 6 for 25 and 3 for 103 against Leicestershire. He captained Wellington in the 1934–35 Plunket Shield season, taking 6 for 82 and 5 for 48 in the match against Otago. When the MCC toured New Zealand in 1935–36 he was selected in two of the four matches New Zealand played against the tourists, taking six wickets, all of top-order batsmen, at an average of 19.50.

Blundell was President of the New Zealand Cricket Board from 1959 to 1962.

== High Commissioner ==
Blundell was appointed by Prime Minister Keith Holyoake as High Commissioner for New Zealand in Britain and Ambassador to Ireland in 1968. In 1972 he returned to New Zealand.

== Governor-General ==
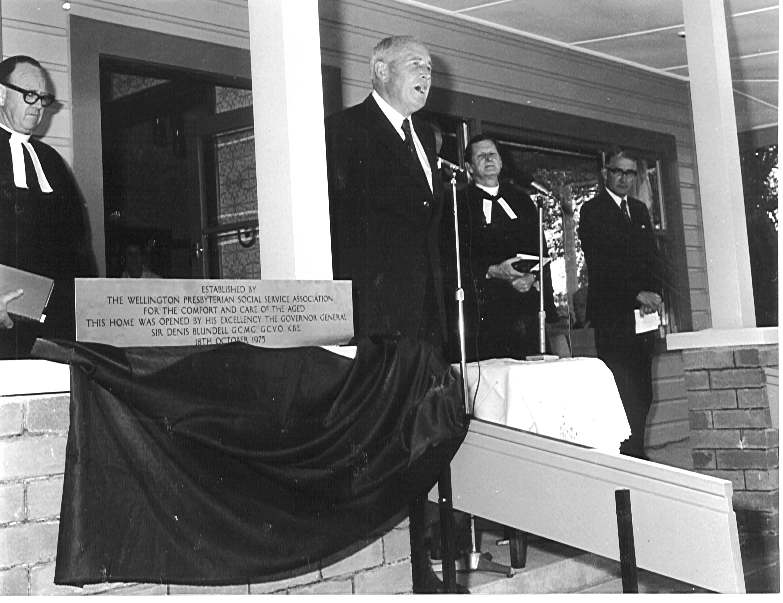
Sir Denis Blundell opens Reevedon Home, Levin, on 18 October 1975.

Blundell was appointed in 1972 by Queen Elizabeth II on the advice of her prime minister Jack Marshall to the office of Governor-General of New Zealand. The Leader of the Opposition, Norman Kirk, did not support the appointment, because of Blundell's friendship with the Prime Minister. At his swearing-in ceremony, the Prime Minister referred to Blundell as "a close personal friend over many years in the law, in the battle of the EEC and in many a battle on the golf-course". Blundell was the first New Zealand-born and resident Governor-General, and his appointment prompted David Lange to say "it sort of made us somehow mortal. A man who was a lawyer and the son of a newspaper publisher could become The Queen in drag."

Blundell was the first Governor-General to appear on the electoral roll, for the 1972 general election, although it is unknown whether he voted (under New Zealand electoral law a citizen is only required to register to vote). In office Blundell dispensed with the traditional plumed helmet, stating "I'd feel an awful Joe underneath one of those hats." Instead, he wore a plain uniform, and usually only for visits to military bases. His term ended in 1977.

As Governor-General, Blundell was appointed a Knight Grand Cross of the Order of St Michael and St George and Knight of the Order of St John in 1972, Knight Grand Cross of the Royal Victorian Order in 1974, and Companion of the Queen's Service Order for public service in 1977.

== Later life ==
Blundell died while on holiday at Townsville, Queensland, Australia, in 1984. He was buried at Purewa Cemetery in the Auckland suburb of Meadowbank. His wife, June, Lady Blundell, died in 2012.

== Arms ==
Coat of arms of Denis Blundell
Notes Sir Denis Blundell's arms are: Crest Two branches of Laurel leaved and fructed Proper an Acorn Argent in front of an Escallop reversed Gules Escutcheon Barruly Argent and Sable on a Chief Vert three Pallets Or in front of the centre Pallet a Torteau Gules Supporters Dexter: an Owl Proper; Sinister: a Moa Proper Motto To Serve with Tolerance Other versions

Diplomatic posts
Preceded by Tom Macdonald	High Commissioner of New Zealand to the United Kingdom; 1968–1972	Succeeded by Merwyn Norrish (acting); Terry McCombs
Government offices
Preceded by Sir Arthur Porritt	Governor-General of New Zealand; 1972–1977	Succeeded by Sir Keith Holyoake
