= 1977 Wellington mayoral election =

New Zealand local election

- 8 October 1977
- Turnout: 41,641 (46.88%)
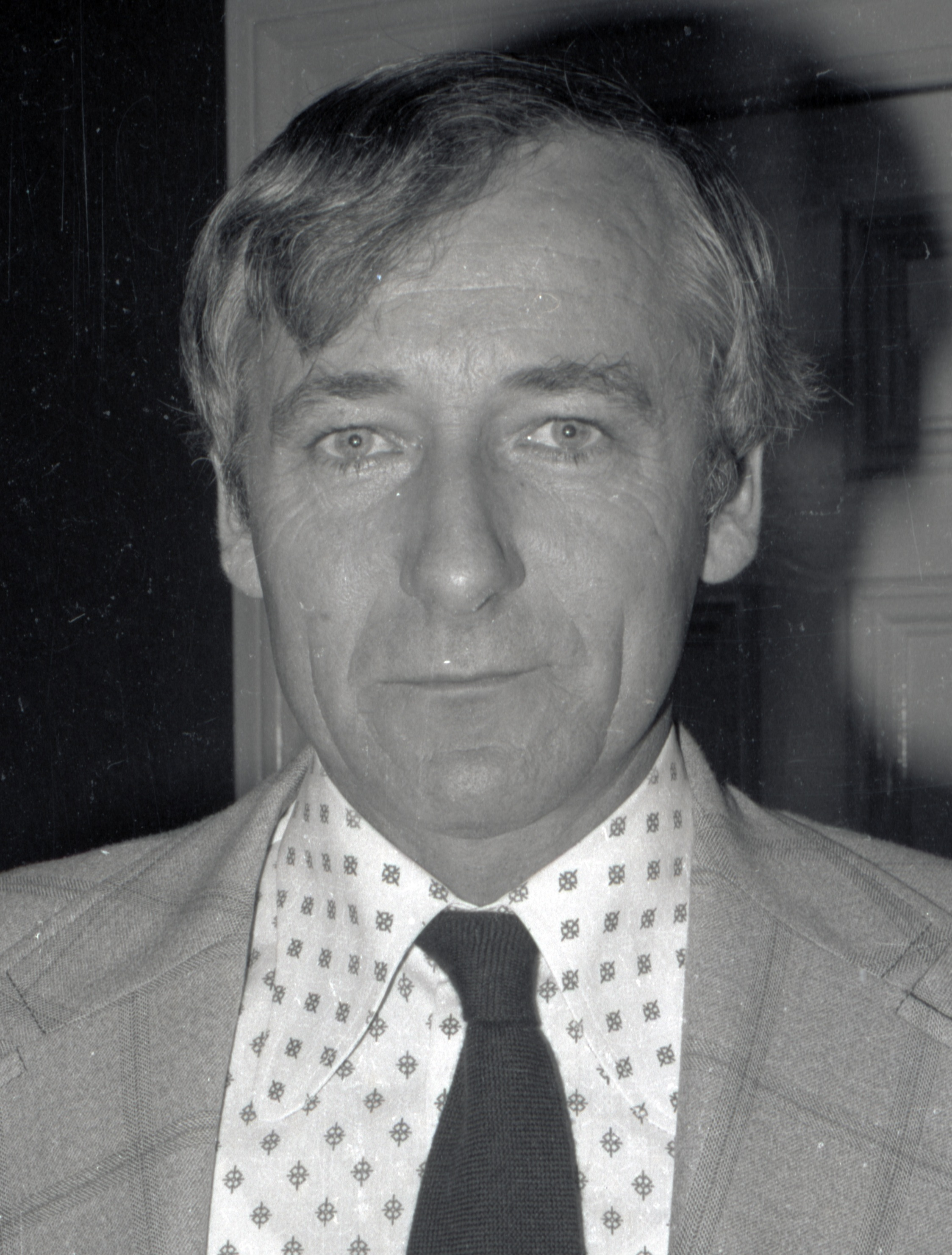

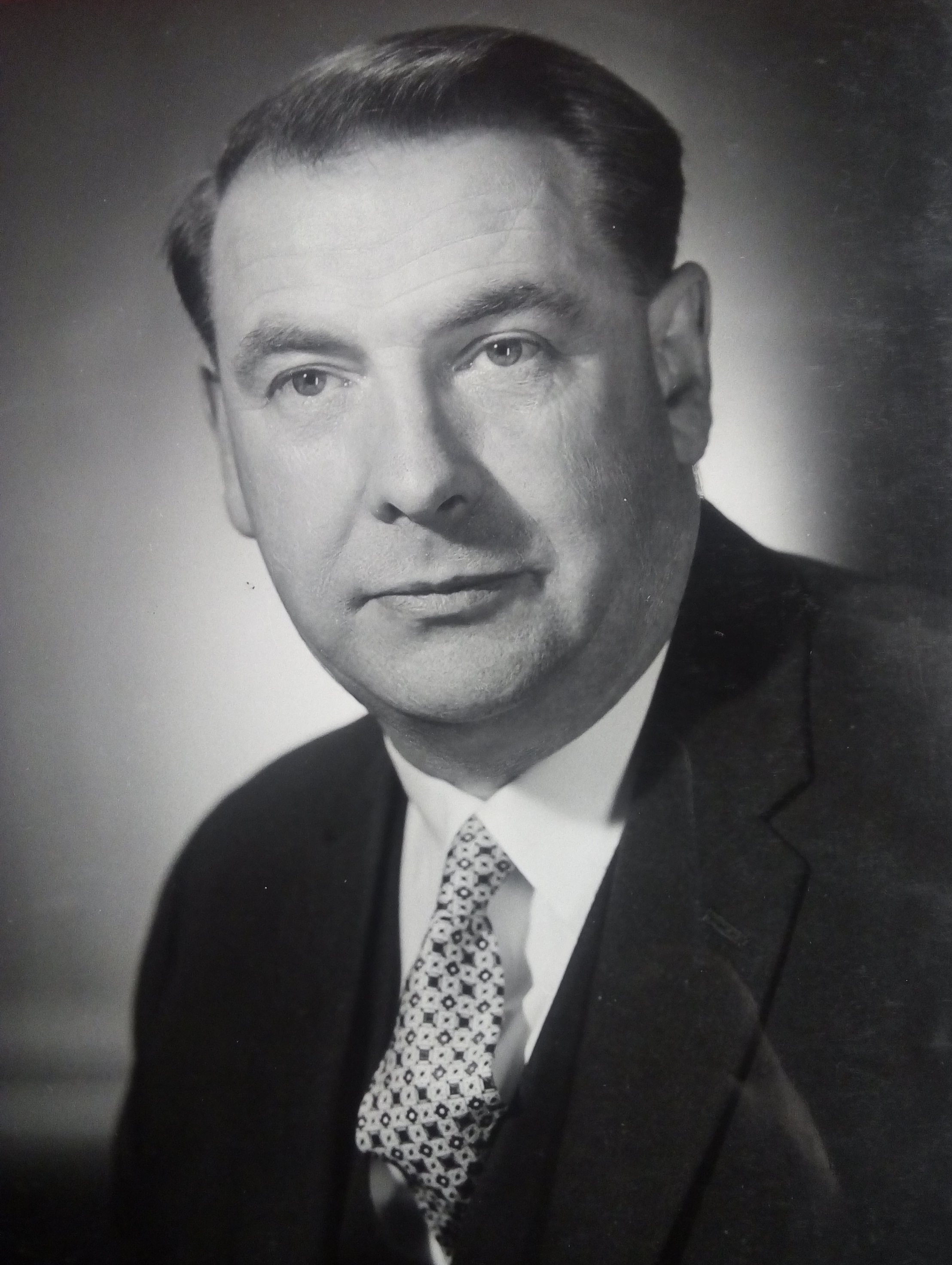

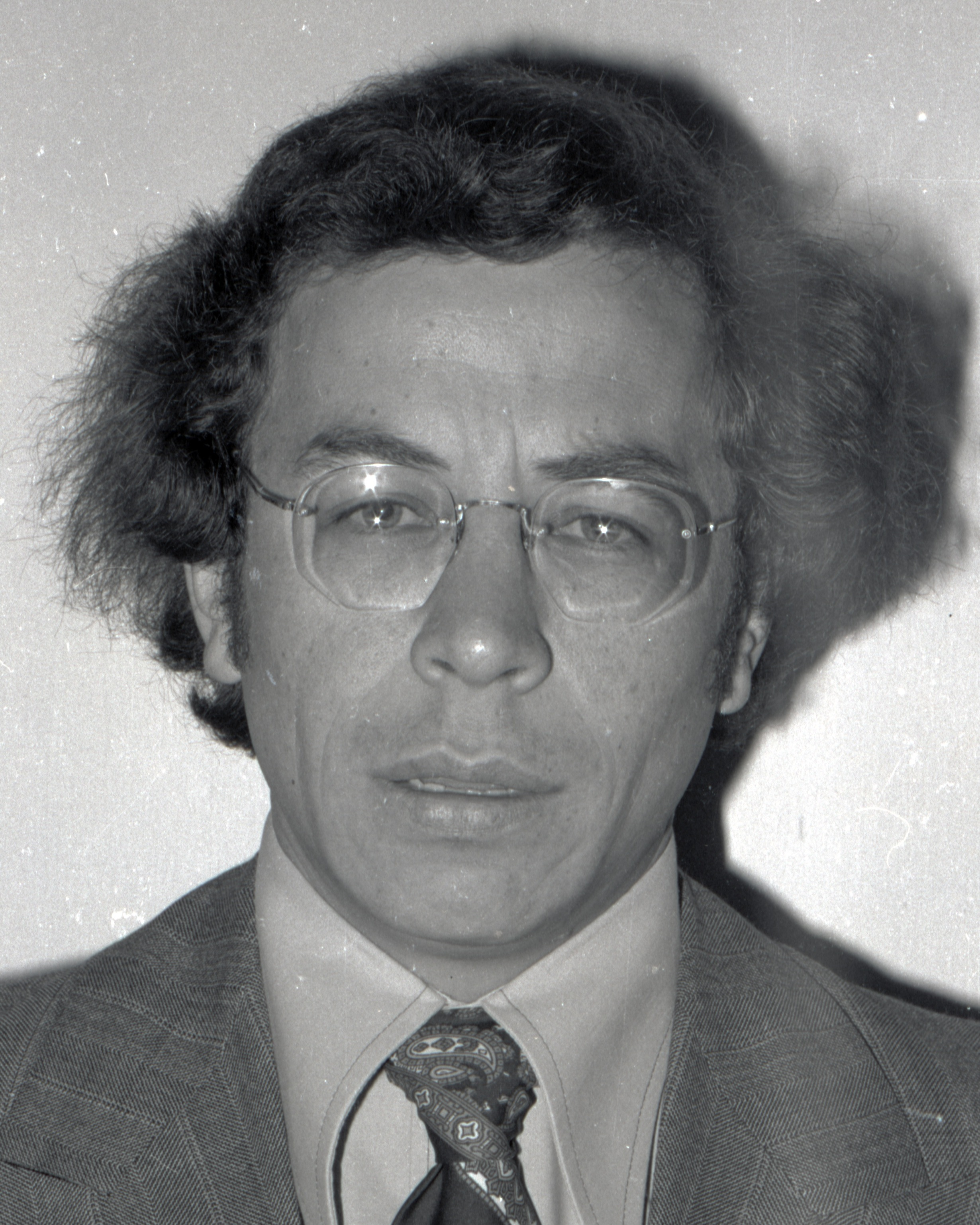

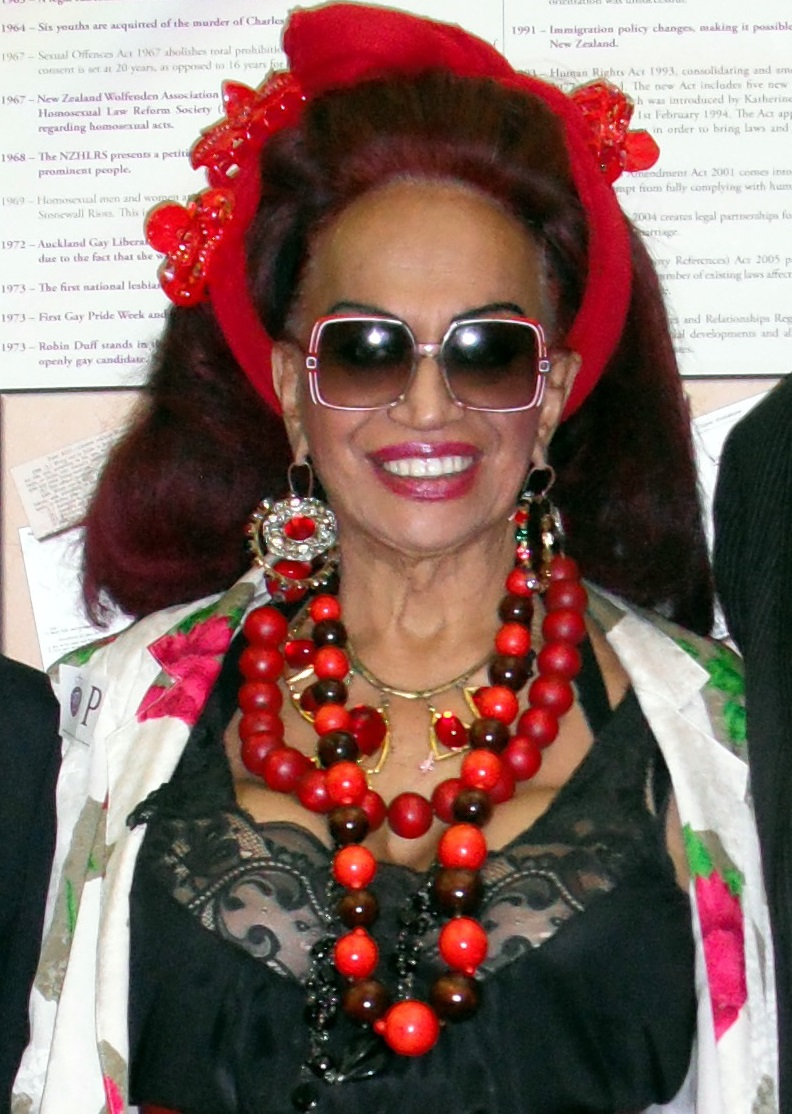
| Candidate | Michael Fowler | Sir Frank Kitts |
| Party | Citizens' | Labour |
| Popular vote | 17,041 | 14,022 |
| Percentage | 40.92 | 33.67 |
| Candidate | Tony Brunt | Carmen |
| Party | Values | Independent |
| Popular vote | 7,996 | 1,686 |
| Percentage | 19.20 | 4.04 |
Mayor before election
Michael Fowler
Elected mayor
Michael Fowler

The 1977 Wellington mayoral election was part of the New Zealand local elections held that same year. In 1977, election were held for the Mayor of Wellington plus other local government positions including eighteen city councillors. The polling was conducted using the standard first-past-the-post electoral method.

== Background ==
The 1977 mayoralty was notable for the highly publicised candidacy of Carmen Rupe, a transgender drag performer and brothel keeper. With the support of local businessman Bob Jones, who organised her campaign and wrote her speeches, Carmen's campaign utilised the slogans Get in Behind and Carmen for Mayor and campaigned on a platform to legalise gay marriage and brothels, despite neither being local-government matters in New Zealand.

Former mayor Sir Frank Kitts attempted a comeback after losing narrowly three years earlier. His candidature took many by surprise with the press expecting Labour to try and rejuvenate. Local businessman Jim Belich was approached, but he declined for personal reasons. Frank O'Flynn also considered standing, but withdrew in favour of Kitts, though O'Flynn stood on the council ticket and was elected. A Dominion editorial said of Kitts' candidature "No one knew what Frank Kitts did during his three years in the political wilderness and no one knew why he wanted to come back". His support in the mayoral race fell further, though he was again elected to the Wellington Harbour Board where his vote increased.

== Mayoralty results ==
1977 Wellington mayoral election
| Party | Candidate | Votes | % | ±% |
|---|---|---|---|---|
| Citizens' | Michael Fowler | 17,041 | 40.92 | −0.44 |
| Labour | Sir Frank Kitts | 14,022 | 33.67 | −6.68 |
| Values | Tony Brunt | 7,996 | 19.20 | +3.85 |
| Independent | Carmen | 1,686 | 4.04 | |
| Independent Citizens' | Saul Goldsmith | 568 | 1.36 | −0.76 |
| Independent | Ivan Solt | 167 | 0.40 | |
| Civic Reform | Donald McMillan | 161 | 0.38 | |
| Informal votes | | 280 | 0.67 | |
| Majority | | 3,019 | 7.25 | +6.24 |
| Turnout | | 41,641 | 46.88 | +3.76 |

== Councillor results ==
1977 Wellington City Council election
| Party | Candidate | Votes | % | ±% |
|---|---|---|---|---|
| Values | Tony Brunt | 20,664 | 49.62 | +9.17 |
| Citizens' | Ian Lawrence | 20,617 | 49.51 | +6.26 |
| Labour | Bill Jeffries | 20,415 | 49.02 | +6.76 |
| Citizens' | Stewart Duff | 20,141 | 48.36 | +1.36 |
| Labour | Keith Spry | 20,133 | 48.34 | +9.65 |
| Citizens' | Betty Campbell | 20,122 | 48.32 | +3.89 |
| Citizens' | Rosemary Young | 20,069 | 48.19 | +10.35 |
| Citizens' | Audrey Fitzgerald | 19,609 | 47.09 | +6.93 |
| Labour | Brian O'Brien | 18,829 | 45.21 | −9.06 |
| Labour | Frank O'Flynn | 18,510 | 44.45 | |
| Citizens' | Irvine Yardley | 18,035 | 43.31 | +6.97 |
| Citizens' | John Wootton | 17,709 | 42.52 | +9.58 |
| Citizens' | Jim McMillan | 17,600 | 42.26 | +7.89 |
| Labour | Joe Aspell | 17,475 | 41.96 | +4.69 |
| Labour | Jenny Brough | 16,019 | 38.46 | |
| Labour | Helene Ritchie | 15,871 | 38.11 | |
| Citizens' | Bruce Harris | 15,529 | 37.29 | +2.52 |
| Citizens' | Gavin Wilson | 15,353 | 36.86 | |
| Labour | Marijke Robinson | 15,291 | 36.72 | |
| Citizens' | David Bull | 14,917 | 35.82 | |
| Labour | Tala Cleverley (Note: Cleverley was appointed to fill the vacancy on the council in 1979 caused by Irvine Yardley's resignation) | 15,056 | 36.15 | |
| Citizens' | Alan Revell | 14,860 | 35.68 | |
| Labour | Jim Edwards | 14,716 | 35.34 | |
| Citizens' | Les Chapman | 14,667 | 35.22 | −3.98 |
| Labour | Fanaura Kingstone | 14,377 | 34.53 | |
| Citizens' | Des Hoskins | 14,376 | 34.52 | −1.56 |
| Labour | Jim Kebbell | 14,270 | 34.26 | |
| Labour | Tilly Hunter | 14,235 | 34.18 | |
| Citizens' | Les Paske | 14,166 | 34.01 | |
| Labour | John Ulrich | 13,972 | 33.55 | +5.34 |
| Citizens' | Ernie Gartrell | 13,709 | 32.92 | |
| Citizens' | Seton Nossiter | 13,703 | 32.90 | |
| Citizens' | George Nicholls | 13,423 | 32.23 | −0.72 |
| Labour | Joe McTaggart | 13,022 | 31.27 | |
| Labour | Ross Simpson | 12,561 | 30.16 | |
| Labour | Mark Peck | 11,881 | 28.53 | |
| Values | Judith Reinken | 8,745 | 21.00 | |
| Independent Citizens' | Saul Goldsmith | 7,636 | 18.33 | −6.49 |
| Values | Chris Wheeler | 7,269 | 17.45 | |
| Independent | Carmen | 6,817 | 16.37 | |
| Values | Brian Dreadon | 6,766 | 16.24 | |
| Civic Reform | Donald McMillan | 4,761 | 11.43 | |
| Independent | David Mitchell | 2,963 | 7.11 | |
| Independent | Ron England | 2,860 | 6.86 | −12.00 |
| Independent | Ivan Solt | 2,731 | 6.55 | |
| Civic Reform | Amatanga Sooialo | 2,547 | 6.11 | |
| Independent | Frank Moncur | 2,218 | 5.32 | −10.13 |
| Civic Reform | James Quinn | 2,100 | 5.04 | |
| Civic Reform | James Billings | 1,852 | 4.44 | |

Table footnotes:
