= Papanui (electorate) =

Papanui is a former New Zealand parliamentary electorate. The electorate was in the northern suburbs of the city of Christchurch, and existed from 1969 to 1984.

== Population centres ==
Through an amendment in the Electoral Act in 1965, the number of electorates in the South Island was fixed at 25, an increase of one since the 1962 electoral redistribution. It was accepted that through the more rapid population growth in the North Island, the number of its electorates would continue to increase, and to keep proportionality, three new electorates were allowed for in the 1967 electoral redistribution for the next election. In the North Island, five electorates were newly created and one electorate was reconstituted while three electorates were abolished. In the South Island, three electorates were newly created (including Papanui) and one electorate was reconstituted while three electorates were abolished. The overall effect of the required changes was highly disruptive to existing electorates, with all but three electorates having their boundaries altered. These changes came into effect with the 1969 election.

Most of the area covered by the Papanui electorate had previously been with the Fendalton electorate, but a smaller portion was previously with St Albans. In 1969, the electorate extended from Harewood in the west to Little Hagley Park in the south-east. In the 1972 electoral redistribution, the electorate's area slightly reduced. In the 1972 electoral redistribution, the electorate moved significantly to the north up to the Waimakariri River, incorporating Belfast into its area, which had previously belonged to Rangiora. Papanui was abolished through the 1983 electoral redistribution, with Christchurch North taking up most of its area; the abolition came into effect with the 1984 election.

== History ==
Bert Walker had since the 1960 election been the representative of the St Albans electorate for the National Party. When the Papanui electorate was formed in 1969, he transferred to there. After three parliamentary terms for Papanui, he was defeated by Labour's Mike Moore. With the abolition of the Papanui electorate in 1984, Moore transferred to the Christchurch North electorate and briefly became Prime Minister while representing that electorate.

=== Members of Parliament ===
The electorate was represented by two members of parliament.

Key

National Labour

Election	Winner
1969 election	Bert Walker
1972 election	Bert Walker
1975 election	Bert Walker
1978 election	Mike Moore
1981 election	Mike Moore
(Electorate abolished 1984; see Christchurch North)

== Election results ==
=== 1981 election ===
1981 general election: Papanui
Party	Candidate	Votes	%	±%
Labour	Mike Moore	11,524	55.36	+2.44
National	Brian Keeley	7,115	34.18	
Social Credit	Thomas Langridge	2,174	10.44	
Majority		4,409	21.18	+4.97
Turnout		20,813	91.30	+15.56
Registered electors		22,795		

=== 1978 election ===
1978 general election: Papanui
Party	Candidate	Votes	%	±%
Labour	Mike Moore	10,737	52.92	
National	Bert Walker	7,448	36.71	−15.81
Social Credit	Gary Clover	1,359	6.69	
Values	Tony Kunowski	735	3.62	−4.02
Tory	John Collins	8	0.03	
Majority		3,289	16.21	
Turnout		20,287	75.74	−7.84
Registered electors		26,784		

=== 1975 election ===
1975 general election: Papanui
Party	Candidate	Votes	%	±%
National	Bert Walker	10,238	52.52	+0.75
Labour	Rod Garden	7,523	38.59	
Values	Tony Kunowski	1,490	7.64	
Social Credit	Bruce Laking	509	2.61	−0.06
Majority		2,985	15.31	+5.64
Turnout		19,490	83.58	−7.50
Registered electors		23,318		

=== 1972 election ===
1972 general election: Papanui
Party	Candidate	Votes	%	±%
National	Bert Walker	9,278	51.77	−1.78
Labour	Mollie Clark	7,544	42.09	
Values	Gary Williams	533	2.97	
Social Credit	Bruce Laking	480	2.67	
Union Movement	Owen Beaumont	48	0.26	
New Democratic	Robert John Grenfell	37	0.20	
Majority		1,734	9.67	−2.47
Turnout		17,920	91.08	−1.27
Registered electors		19,673		

=== 1969 election ===
1969 general election: Papanui
Party	Candidate	Votes	%	±%
National	Bert Walker	9,242	53.55	
Labour	Martin Hobby	7,146	41.40	
Social Credit	John Mattews	771	4.46	
Keynesian Progress	Mark Sadler	99	0.57	
Majority		2,096	12.14	
Turnout		17,258	92.35	
Registered electors		18,687		
