= 1974 Wellington mayoral election =

New Zealand local election

- 12 October 1974
- Turnout: 36,212 (43.12%)
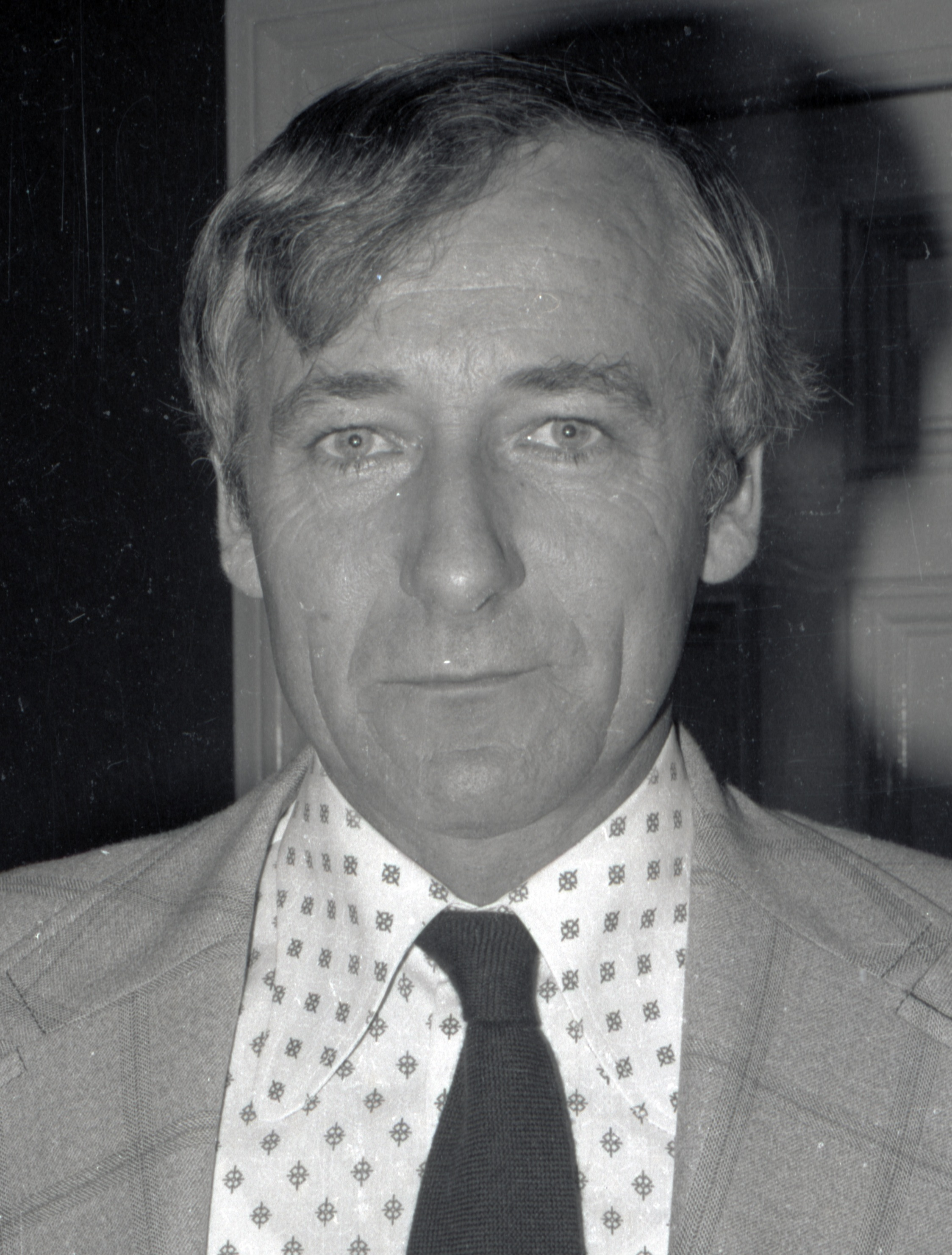

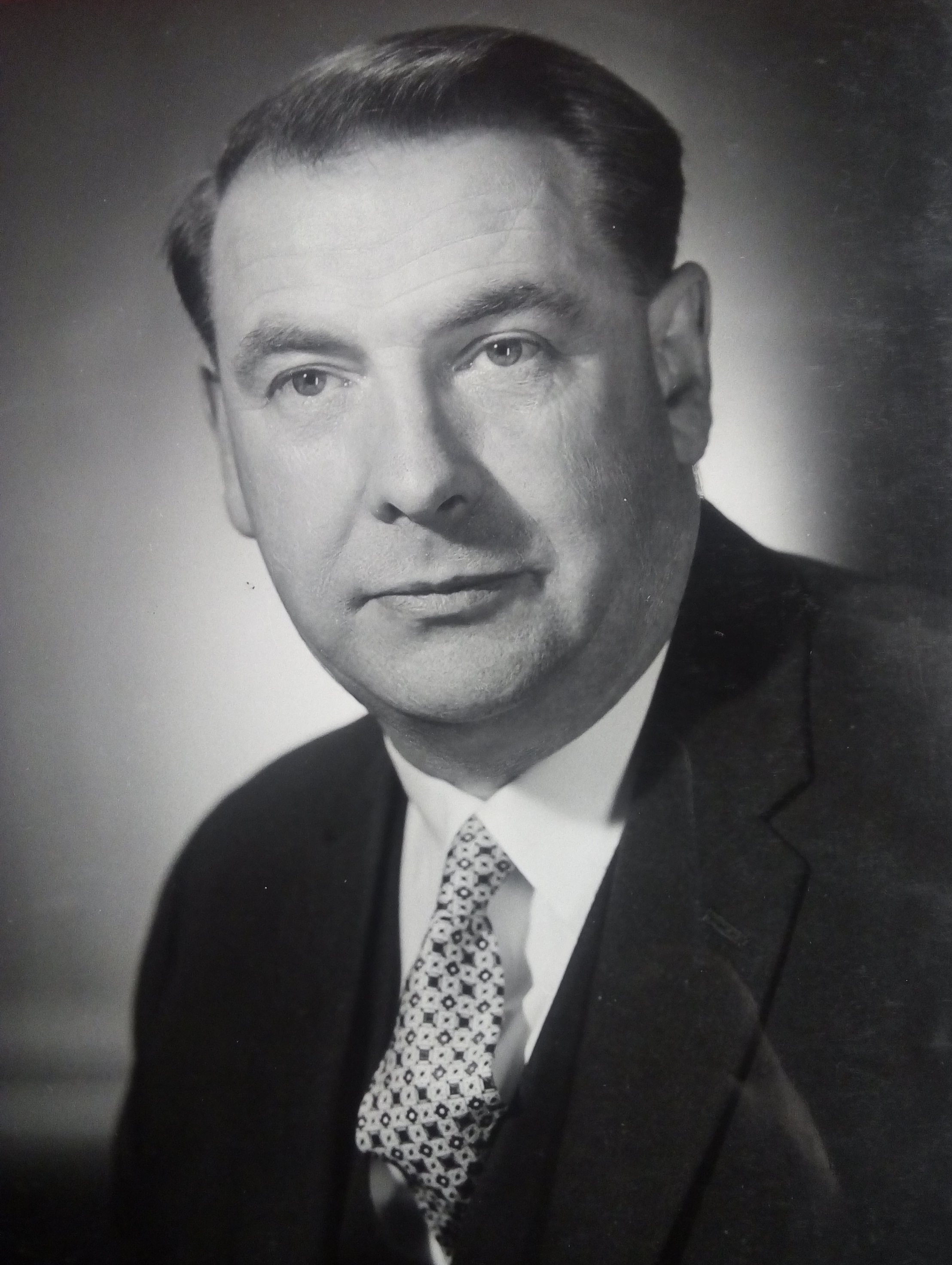

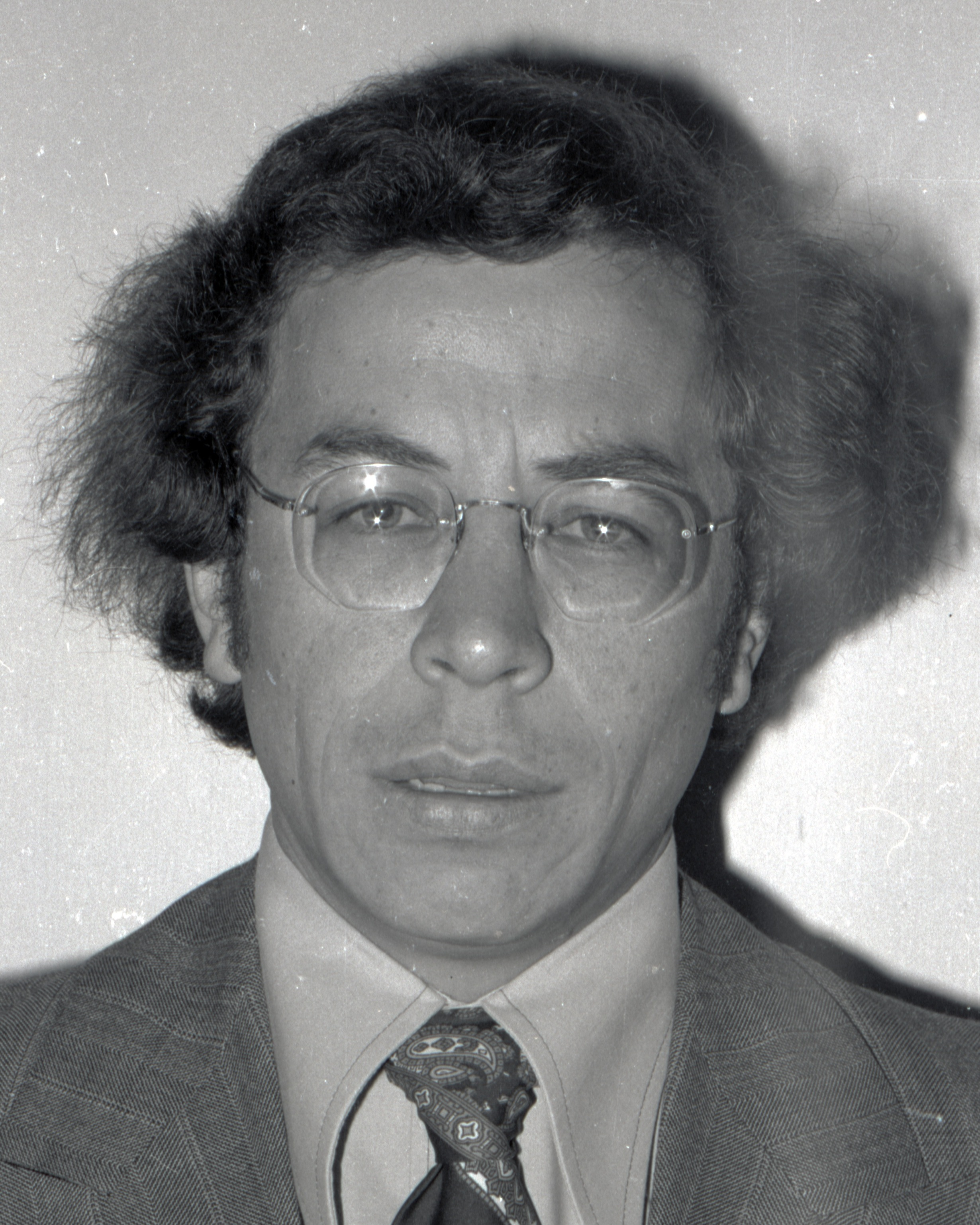
Candidate	Michael Fowler	Sir Frank Kitts	Tony Brunt
Party	Citizens'	Labour	Values
Popular vote	14,980	14,613	5,559
Percentage	41.36	40.35	15.35
Mayor before election
Sir Frank Kitts
Elected mayor
Michael Fowler

The 1974 Wellington mayoral election was part of the New Zealand local elections held that same year. In 1974, elections were held for the Mayor of Wellington plus other local government positions including eighteen city councillors. The polling was conducted using the standard first-past-the-post electoral method.

== Background ==
The 1974 election was famous for its close result. With a provisional majority that was small enough to be potentially eroded by special votes the final result was not known for nearly a month following several re-counts due to the closeness of the polling. Michael Fowler had an election night lead of 387 while over 4,000 special votes were cast which ended up being very evenly distributed between the two top contenders. In the end Fowler's majority was reduced by only 20 votes and he was duly declared elected as Wellington's new mayor. Sir Frank Kitts lost the Mayoralty after a record 18 years in the role, though he was still re-elected to the Wellington Harbour Board.

The election saw the entry of the environmentalist Values Party into civic politics in Wellington, making it the second nationwide political party to participate in local elections. The Values Party did better than expected with party founder Tony Brunt elected to the council, the first successful third-party candidate in Wellington history. Brunt also stood for Mayor with his candidacy drawing away many left-wing voters from the Labour Party. Outgoing Mayor Frank Kitts was to blame the Values vote for his defeat.

== Mayoralty results ==
1974 Wellington mayoral election
Party	Candidate	Votes	%	±%
Citizens'	Michael Fowler	14,980	41.36	
Labour	Sir Frank Kitts	14,613	40.35	−23.4
Values	Tony Brunt	5,559	15.35	
Independent	Saul Goldsmith	768	2.12	
Independent	Margaret Gellen	292	0.80	
Majority		367	1.01	
Turnout		36,212	43.12	−1.28

== Councillor results ==
1974 Wellington City Council election
Party	Candidate	Votes	%	±%
Citizens'	Michael Fowler (Note: As Fowler won the Mayoralty his election to the council was voided and his seat was awarded to the highest polling unsuccessful candidate.)	15,670	53.27	+10.33
Labour	David Shand	13,910	48.41	+2.57
Citizens'	Stewart Duff	13,402	47.00	−4.72
Citizens'	Betty Campbell	12,471	44.43	−4.82
Citizens'	Denis Foot	12,235	43.78	+1.79
Citizens'	Ian Lawrence	12,041	43.25	+5.43
Labour	Bill Jeffries	11,683	42.26	
Citizens'	Ron Button	11,202	40.93	+1.05
Values	Tony Brunt	11,030	40.45	
Citizens'	Audrey MacIntyre	10,923	40.16	
Citizens'	Les Chapman	10,576	39.20	−1.27
Labour	Keith Spry	10,390	38.69	−5.62
Citizens'	Rosemary Young	10,085	37.84	
Labour	Joe Aspell	9,876	37.27	−0.50
Citizens'	Irvine Yardley	9,539	36.34	
Labour	Brian O'Brien	9,473	36.15	−5.25
Citizens'	Des Hoskins	9,447	36.08	
Citizens'	John Wootton	9,397	35.94	
Labour	Matthew Bennett	9,210	35.43	
Labour	Barbara Holt	9,209	35.43	
Citizens'	Bruce Harris	8,973	34.77	
Citizens'	Jim McMillain	8,827	34.37	
Labour	Molly Bleakley	8,319	32.97	
Citizens'	George Nicholls	8,312	32.95	
Labour	Lani Tupu	8,173	32.56	
Labour	Ian Haldane	8,095	32.35	
Labour	Pat Brockie	8,038	32.19	−1.95
Labour	Alane Hill	7,988	32.05	
Citizens'	Ralph Miller	7,968	32.00	
Citizens'	Peter Mills	7,917	31.86	
Labour	Angela Sears	7,684	31.21	
Labour	Sue Piper	7,664	31.16	
Labour	John Morgan	7,146	29.73	
Labour	David Walker	6,995	29.31	
Labour	John Ulrich	6,595	28.21	
Values	Desmond Kelly	6,330	27.48	
Values	Annabel McLaren	6,026	26.64	
Values	Terry McDavitt	5,755	25.89	
Independent Citizens'	Saul Goldsmith	5,368	24.82	+5.70
Independent	Gordon Morrison	4,574	22.63	
Independent	Ron England	3,212	18.86	+10.52
Independent	William Emsley	3,205	18.85	
Independent Citizens'	Donald McPherson	2,976	18.21	+11.21
Liberal	Bill O'Brien	2,829	17.81	
Independent Citizens'	Frank Moncur	1,975	15.45	+12.12
Independent Labour	Kenneth Marlow	1,785	14.92	

Table footnotes:
