= Janet McVeagh =

New Zealand activist and co-leader of the Values Party

Janet Mary McVeagh (27 December 1941 – 31 December 2004) was a New Zealand disability worker, environmentalist and politician who was a co-leader of the Values Party in the 1980s.

== Biography ==
McVeagh worked for the Crippled Children Society (CCS) as a recreation officer in New Plymouth and later Auckland. She had four children, three sons and one daughter.

She was a long-time advocate for the environment and social justice, leading her to join the Values Party upon its foundation in 1972. McVeagh was the organiser for several local environmental campaigns including protests against the government Think Big policies, to oppose the building of a synthetic petrol plant at Motunui and a clean sea action group which lobbied to get a clean sewage treatment plant in New Plymouth. In 1982 she founded, Residents Against Dioxin, a New Plymouth-based group to cease the production of 2,4,5-Trichlorophenoxyacetic acid (a toxic pesticide used in agriculture) in New Zealand.

As Janet Roborgh she contested the electorate of New Plymouth as the Values candidate at the 1978, 1981 and 1984 elections. In 1981 she was elected a co-leader of the Values Party. She led the party in two general elections before resigning at the 1988 party conference. The Values Party was wound down starting in 1989 and in 1990 the remnants became part of the new Green Party. McVeagh became the Green Party's disabilities spokesperson.

In 1993 McVeagh moved to Auckland and at the 1999 election was the Green Party candidate for Epsom. She was also allotted the relatively high list placing of 13. She finished fourth out of eleven candidates and was not high enough on the Green Party list to be elected. In Auckland McVeagh started her own business, Janet McVeagh Recreation Ltd, which provided recreation services for disabled adults and children.

She died in Auckland in December 2004. Her children continued to run her company after her death.

== Notes ==
Party political offices
Preceded by Margaret Crozier (As sole party leader)	Co-leader of the Values Party; 1981–1988; Served alongside: Jon Mayson, Alan Wilkinson, Mike Ward	Succeeded by Rosalie Steward
