= Tony Kunowski =

New Zealand politician

Member of the Canterbury Regional Council
- In office 10 October 1992 – 14 October 1995
- Constituency: Christchurch

3rd Leader of the Values Party
- In office 19 April 1976 – 12 May 1979
- Deputy: Margaret Crozier
- Preceded by: Reg Clough
- Succeeded by: Margaret Crozier

Personal details
- Born: Antony Hubert Kunowski; 1946 (age 79–80) England
- Party: Values (1972-1979)
- Education: University of Canterbury

Antony Hubert Kunowski (born 1946) is a New Zealand politician. He was the leader of the Values Party in the 1970s and was later an elected local-body representative in Canterbury.

== Biography ==
Kunowski was born in England, the son of a free Polish forces pilot who fought in the Battle of Britain, before migrating to New Zealand in 1962. Living initially in Stokes Valley he attended Naenae College and went to Victoria University, where he studied towards a Bachelor of Science in mathematics, though finished the degree at University of Canterbury. He then worked in a marketing job with an oil company before deciding to return to university studying for two years to attain a Master of Commerce degree. He was subsequently employed at the Department of Industries and Commerce. He then became a tutor in economics and statistics at the Christchurch Technical Institute.

He joined the Values Party in 1972 (the year the party was founded) and helped set up the party's Papanui branch. At the 1975 and 1978 elections he stood as the Values Party candidate in the Christchurch electorate of Papanui where he placed third and fourth respectively. In 1976 he was elected leader of the party. At the 1978 election he was the leader of the party which saw the party lose 2.78% of the vote. In 1979 deputy leader Margaret Crozier challenged Kunowski for the leadership of the party. She was successful defeating Kunowski 151 votes to 140 in a members ballot at the annual party conference. Following his defeat, he responded by leaving the Values Party altogether.

He later became a banker. He then joined the Labour Party and was elected to the Canterbury Regional Council in 1992 on the Labour ticket. He was narrowly defeated in 1995 following an electoral boundary redrawing.

In 2013 he became the Manager at Canterbury Horticultural Society.

== Notes ==
Party political offices
Preceded by Reg Clough	Leader of the Values Party; 1976–1979	Succeeded by Margaret Crozier
