= Mike Ward (New Zealand politician) =

Politician from New Zealand

Mike Ward JP
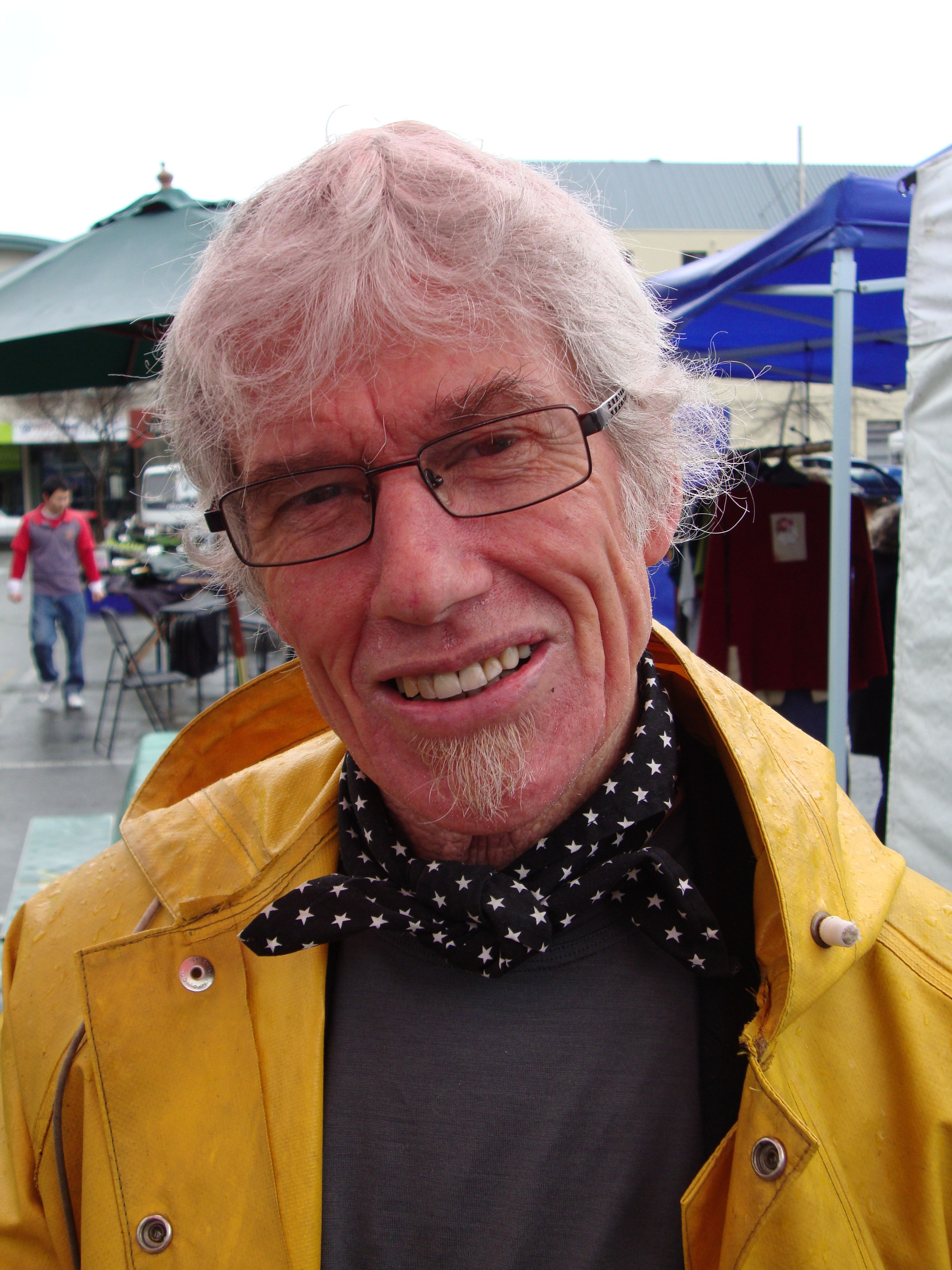
- Ward in 2010

Member of the New Zealand Parliament for Green party list
- In office 27 July 2002 – 17 September 2005

4th Co-leader of the Values Party
- In office 27 August 1984 – 26 May 1990 Co-leading with Janet Roborgh (1984-88); Rosalie Steward (1988-90)
- Preceded by: Jon Mayson and Alan Wilkinson
- Succeeded by: Party dissolved

Personal details
- Born: 18 July 1942 (age 84) Hastings, New Zealand
- Party: Green (until 2017)
- Spouse: Joy
- Children: Three
- Occupation: Artist, politician

Michael Grahame Ward JP (born 18 July 1942) is a former Green Party of Aotearoa New Zealand politician. He was an MP for one term from 2002 to 2005. He was co-leader of the Values Party (a predecessor to the modern Greens) from 1985 to 1988. In 2006, Ward was an unsuccessful candidate for male co-leader of the Green Party, following the death of Rod Donald in 2005.

== Early life ==
Born in 1942, Ward was educated at Nelson College from 1956 to 1959. He attended Christchurch Teachers College from 1962 to 1963, gaining a Diploma of Teaching, and worked as a primary school teacher in 1964. He then studied at the University of Canterbury from 1965 to 1968 and was awarded a Diploma of Fine Arts majoring in sculpture. He worked as a secondary school teacher between 1969 and 1977.

== Political career ==
Ward joined the Values Party in 1975 after a visit by the then leader of the party, Reg Clough, to Tokoroa High School where Ward was working as an art teacher. Ward was a Values Party candidate in the 1981, 1984 and 1987 elections. In 1984 he was elected co-leader of the party.

He was a Green Party candidate in the 1990 election. He was an Alliance candidate in the 1993 and 1996 elections. He was a Green Party candidate in the 1999, 2002 and 2005 elections.

=== Member of Parliament ===
New Zealand Parliament
Years	Term	Electorate	List	Party
2002–2005	47th	List	9	Green

Ward was an unsuccessful candidate at seven New Zealand general elections before being elected in the 2002 general election at No. 9 on the Green party list, after the counting of special votes. Although he moved up one place on the list for the 2005 election he lost his seat as the Green vote fell. When he was in Parliament, he was the Green Party spokesperson on Arts and Culture, Older Persons, Small Business, Sports, Fitness and Leisure, Tourism and Waste-free. These portfolios were taken over by the remaining six Green MPs after Ward lost his seat.

Following the death of Rod Donald, shortly after the 2005 election, Ward put his name forward as a contender for the male co-leader position. He lost the position on 3 June 2006 at the annual meeting to Russel Norman in an STV vote by delegates from electorates around the country. Ward was next on the Green party list to re-enter parliament when Nándor Tánczos resigned in 2008. Ward initially declined to stand aside so that Russel Norman, the now co-leader, could take Tánczos's list seat when he resigned from Parliament. Ward changed his mind, because of the advantages in having the party co-leader in Parliament during an election year, and Norman became an MP on 27 June.

=== Nelson City Council ===
Ward served as a Nelson City Councillor from 1983 to 1989, from 1992 to 1998 and from 2011 to 2016. He stood as a candidate for Mayor of Nelson in 1986, 1989 and in 2007. He came a close second in 1989 and came fourth in 2007. He unsuccessfully stood for mayor in 2010. and stood again for mayor in 2019, coming fifth. Ward has also stood unsuccessfully for the Nelson City Council on a number of occasions in 2016, 2019, 2022 and 2025.

=== Creative Alliance ===
In May 2017, Ward announced the formation of a new political party called Creative Alliance. However, as of July 2019 the party has not stood in any elections and is not registered.

== Other activities ==
In 2005, shortly after that year's general election, Ward won the Montana World of Wearable Art Supreme Award. Ward is the only person who completed all the first 28 Coast to Coast races. Ward is also an appointed Justice of the Peace.

Party political offices
Preceded by Jon Mayson; Alan Wilkinson	Co-leader of the Values Party; 1984–1990; Served alongside: Janet Roborgh, Rosalie Steward	Party dissolved
