= Jon Mayson =

Jonathan Irving Mayson CNZM (born 1945) is a New Zealand shipping executive and former politician who was a co-leader of the Values Party in the 1980s.

== Biography ==
Mayson was born in 1945 in Oamaru. Growing up in Whanganui and Dannevirke, his parents were Christian pacifists who he credits as instilling him with a social conscience. Aged 16 he became a sea cadet with the Union Steam Ship Company. In 1972 he got a job as a stevedore in Tauranga beginning a lifetime career in waterfront operations.

He opposed the Vietnam War and sporting contact with apartheid era South Africa, leading him to join the Values Party upon its foundation in 1972, later becoming a co-leader of the party in the 1980s. He contested the electorate of Kaimai as the Values candidate at the 1978 and 1981 elections, where he placed fourth on both occasions. Mayson was elected a member of the Bay of Plenty Harbour Board on a Values Party ticket.

In 1988 he became Tauranga's assistant operations manager. In 1991 he completed a Master of Business Administration degree before being employed as port operations manager in 1992 before becoming chief executive officer of Port of Tauranga in 1997. During his tenure as head of the port container volumes rose from 70,000 to 440,000 annually. In 1996 he was the navigator on a square-rigged replica of HMS Endeavour which retraced the journey of Captain James Cook around New Zealand and Australia. In 2005 he retired as chief executive.

== Honours and recognition ==
In June 2005 he was awarded the Taura Award for services to exporting. He was appointed a Companion of the New Zealand Order of Merit, for services to the shipping industry and to export, in the 2006 New Year Honours.

== Personal life ==
In 2005 he was diagnosed with colon cancer and began chemotherapy treatment.

== Notes ==
Party political offices
Preceded by Margaret Crozier (As sole party leader)	Co-leader of the Values Party; 1981–1984; Served alongside: Janet Roborgh & Alan Wilkinson	Succeeded by Mike Ward
