= Keith Spry =

New Zealand swimmer and politician

Keith Spry MBE
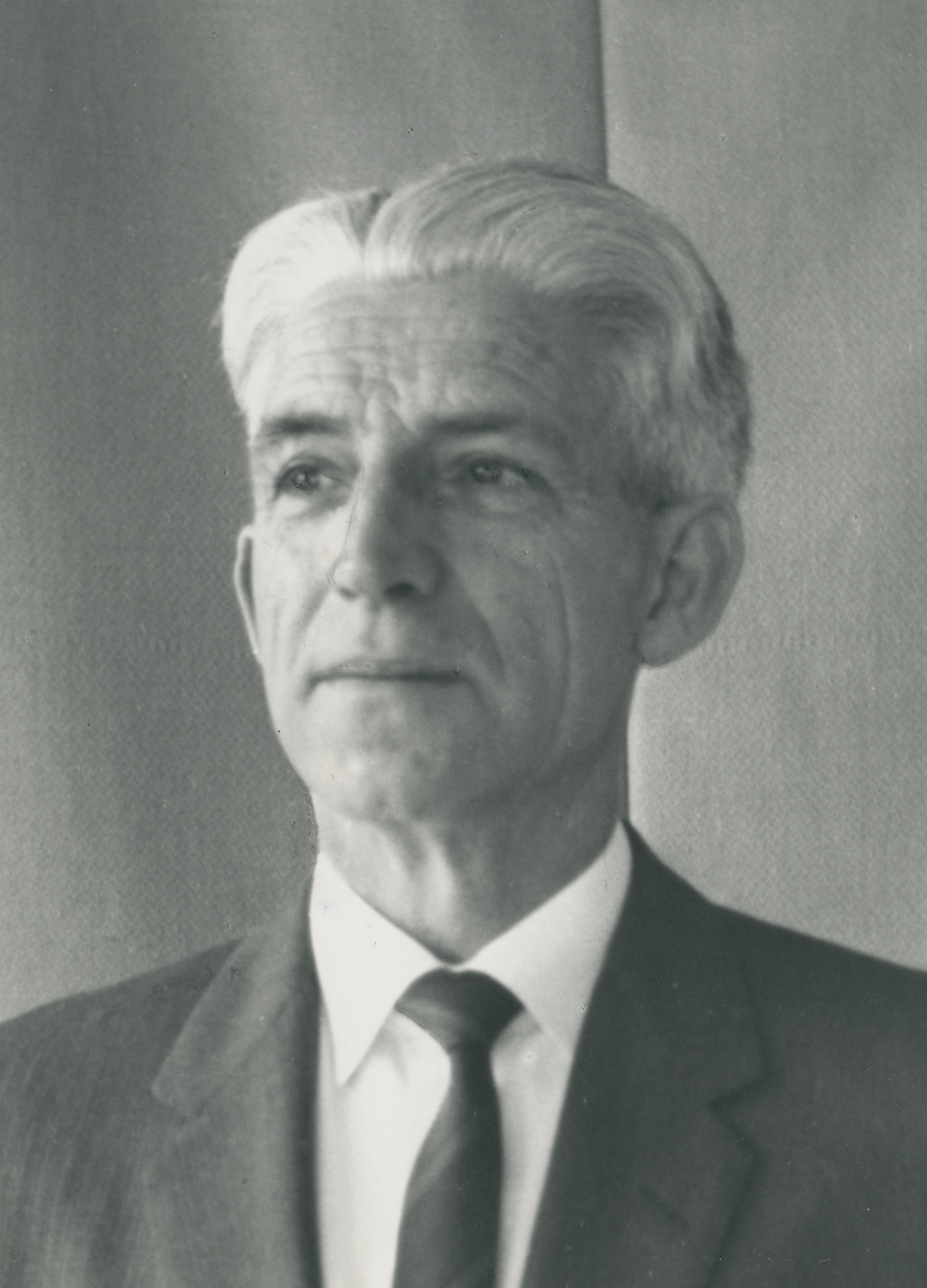
- Spry c. 1965

Member of the Wellington Regional Council
- In office 11 October 1980 – 14 October 1989
- Constituency: Wellington City

Member of the Wellington Harbour Board
- In office 8 October 1977 – 14 October 1989
- Constituency: Wellington City

Member of the Wellington City Council
- In office 9 October 1965 – 11 October 1986
- Constituency: At-large

Personal details
- Born: Stuart Keith Spry; 1911 New Zealand
- Died: 14 October 1991 (aged 79–80) Wellington, New Zealand
- Party: Labour
- Spouse: Eda Burney (m. 1935)
- Children: 4
- Profession: Textile importer and manufacturer

Stuart Keith Spry MBE (1911 – 14 October 1991) was a New Zealand swimmer, conservationist and local politician. On his death The Dominion described him as "one of the great identities of Wellington city".

== Biography ==
=== Early life and career ===
Spry was born in New Zealand in 1911 on either 6 June (death entry) or 6 July (birth entry) to Palmer and Isabel Spry. He was educated at The Terrace School and Wellington Boys' College. In his youth Spry was a talented swimmer. He was New Zealand champion at breaststroke and only narrowly missed out on selection for the New Zealand swim team for the 1934 British Empire Games. His love of swimming, other sports and outdoor activities as a child lasted all of his life. He was a long-serving member of the Wellington Amateur Swimming Club's executive and coaching committees. He was a delegate to the Wellington centre of the New Zealand Amateur Swimming Association. He was active in Surf Life Saving New Zealand and was bestowed with a service award in 1953.

In 1926 Spry began work at a soft goods warehouse for the wholesaler firm of Macky, Logan, Caldwell, Ltd. Later he entered business himself as a textile importer and women's wear manufacturer by trade. He married Edith (Eda) Beatrice Burney in 1935 with whom he had two sons and two daughters.

=== Political career ===
In 1965 Spry was elected to the Wellington City Council on a Labour Party ticket and held a seat continuously until he retired from the council in 1986. Wellington Mayor Sir Michael Fowler later described Spry as an "extremely good" councillor. Spry was a conservationist and spent 15 years as the chairman of the parks and recreation committee. He supported the move by councillor George Porter to formalise town planning procedure and inserted provisions to incentivize developers to preserve areas for open space so locals can use them for recreation. Spry was affectionately known as "Mr Parks" for his advocacy and was labelled as "...a 'greenie' long before the word was ever coined". After the 1974 election he became leader of Labour's council caucus and accordingly he was nominated for the post of Deputy Mayor. Spry was experienced for the role, having been a member of almost every council committee and had been a committee chairman. However he lost the vote to comparatively inexperienced three-year councillor Ian Lawrence.

Spry stood for election to the New Zealand House of Representatives for the Labour Party on two occasions. He stood in Karori in both 1957 and 1963 finishing in second place on both occasions to future Prime Minister Jack Marshall. In 1960 Spry contested the Labour Party nomination for the Heretaunga seat, but was unsuccessful. In 1969 he unsuccessfully contested the Labour pre-selection for Island Bay following the retirement of Arnold Nordmeyer, however he lost to fellow city councillor Gerald O'Brien.

Spry was also a member of the Wellington Harbour Board. He was first elected in 1977 and served four terms until the board was dis-established in 1989. His main achievement on the board was the reclamation of land on the coast. At Spry's insistence much of the area was reserved for recreation and merged to enlarge Marine Park (which is now known as Frank Kitts Park). While supporting reclamation in Wellington city, he opposed similar development in Petone as it would have infringed on the "Queen's Chain" (a 20 metre strip of land near the mouth of the Hutt River) which had been reserved in 1840 to allow free access. He also successfully lobbied for Somes Island to be repurposed from a quarantine station to a dedicated area for conservation and scientific research. Twice he failed to pass a motion for Wellington Harbour to be declared as a nuclear free zone. In 1986 he opposed a plan for the Harbour Board become a public company. Instead the board approved Spry's motion that the board seek legislation giving it commercial autonomy, the ability to enter into port activities such as stevedoring, and the establishment of a single waterside trade union.

He was a foundation member of the Wellington Regional Council, elected for three terms between 1980 and 1989. He was the deputy chairman of the council and chairman of its operations committee. He had a brief absence from the council in early 1988 when he was hospitalised with a knee operation. He remained in hospital longer than expected due to complications with stitching.

=== Death and legacy ===
The Keith Spry Pool in Johnsonville was named after Spry in 1981. Owned and operated by the Wellington City Council, it is an indoor 25 metre heated pool with a diving pool, toddler pool, spa, and sauna: opened in June 1982. Spry was appointed a Member of the Order of the British Empire in the 1986 Queen's Birthday Honours, for services to local-body and community affairs.

Spry died in Wellington on 14 October 1991 survived by his four children. Eda died earlier in the year, on 26 April.
