= Tony Brunt =

New Zealand politician

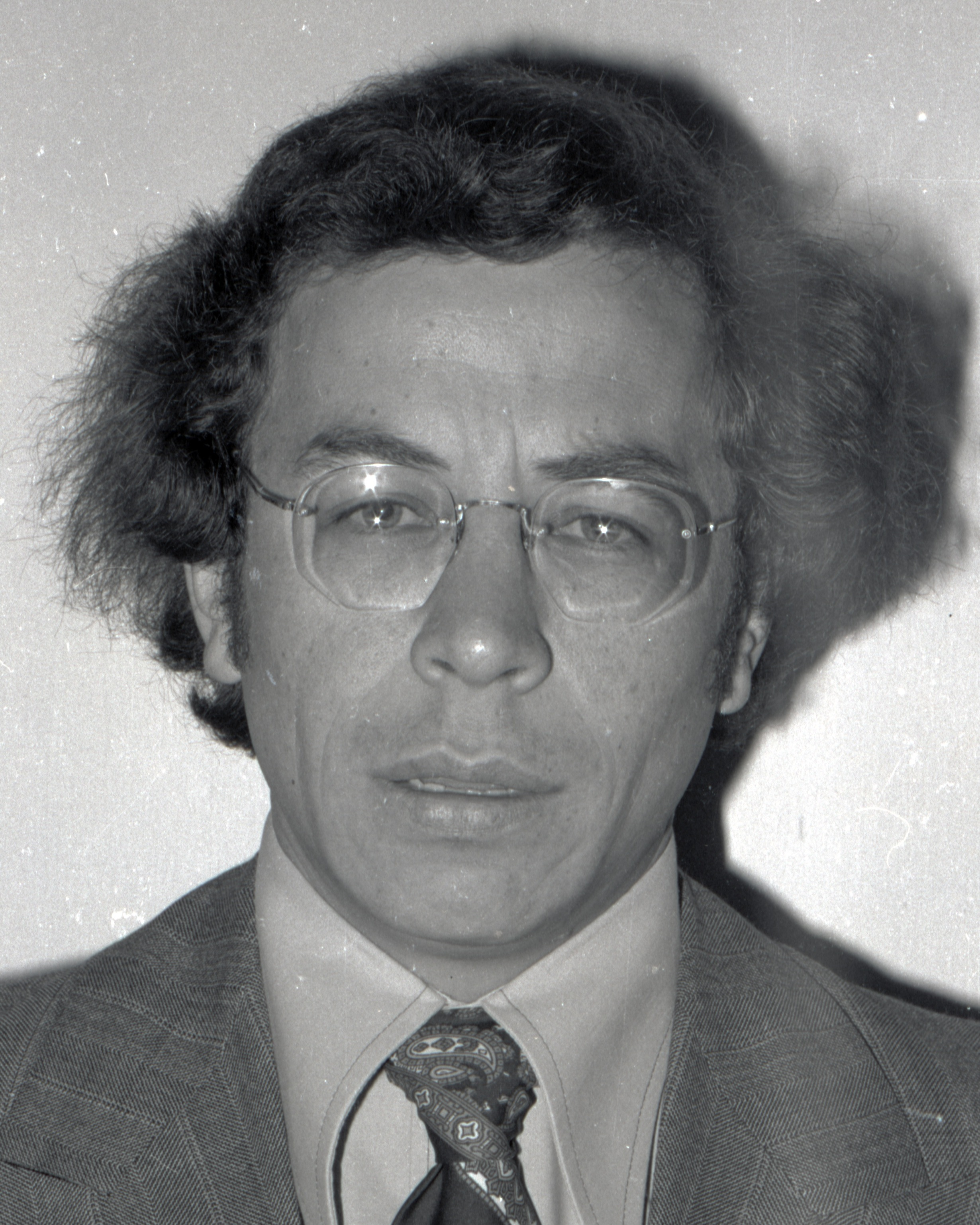
- Brunt in 1976

1st Leader of the Values Party
- In office 30 May 1972 – 25 August 1974
- Deputy: Geoff O'Neill
- Succeeded by: Reg Clough

Member of the Wellington City Council
- In office 12 October 1974 – 11 October 1980
- Constituency: At-large

Personal details
- Born: Anthony John Brunt; 1947 (age 78–79) Auckland, New Zealand
- Party: Values
- Education: Victoria University
- Profession: Journalist

Anthony John Brunt (born 1947) is a New Zealand journalist, activist and politician. He was the founder and leader of the environmentalist Values Party in the 1970s.

== Biography ==
=== Early life ===
Brunt was born in Auckland in 1947 and later became a journalist. He has Samoan ancestry. He briefly changed profession and became a trade union organiser before returning to his career in journalism. He then moved to Wellington to study political science at Victoria University of Wellington.

=== Political career ===
Brunt became politically active and formed the environmentalist Values Party in the early 1970s and served as its inaugural leader. He founded the party to serve as a response to the "barren and miniaturist" political culture that existed in New Zealand at the time. Then aged 25, Brunt was the youngest leader of a political party in New Zealand history. He went on to contest the Wellington electorate of Island Bay at the 1972 election, where he placed third out of six candidates, gaining 7.6% of the vote.

Two years later, he stood for the Wellington mayoralty and City Council on a Values ticket. He placed third for mayor but was easily elected to the council. Brunt's candidacy for the mayoralty was viewed as having drawn away many left-wing voters from the Labour Party. Labour mayor Frank Kitts lost office in a very close race and blamed the Values vote for his defeat. In 1977 he again stood for both positions and was again elected only as a councillor, topping the poll with more votes than any other candidate. Brunt opposed extending the Wellington Urban Motorway to the foot of Mount Victoria. While he was a member of the Council, Brunt was also employed by the Commission for the Environment as an investigating officer. He did not stand for re-election in 1980.

=== Later activities ===
In the 1980s Brunt was chairman of the campaign committee of the Save the Rivers campaign to protect New Zealand's best wild and scenic rivers. Brunt later moved back to Auckland and settled in the suburb of Hillsborough. In 2000, he became the chairman of the Friends of Puketutu Trust, a lobby group campaigning for the Manukau Harbour island of Puketutu to be classified as a regional park.

== Publications ==
- Brunt, Tony. & Samoa Historical and Cultural Trust. (2017). To walk under palm trees : the Germans in Samoa : snapshots from albums. Apia, Samoa : Samoa Historical & Cultural Trust. OCLC 1030297521. (Online e-book edition.)

== Notes ==
Party political offices
| New political party | Leader of the Values Party; 1972–1974 | Succeeded by Reg Clough |
