= Cherry Raymond =

English-born New Zealand broadcaster (1925–2006)

Cherry Raymond QSO
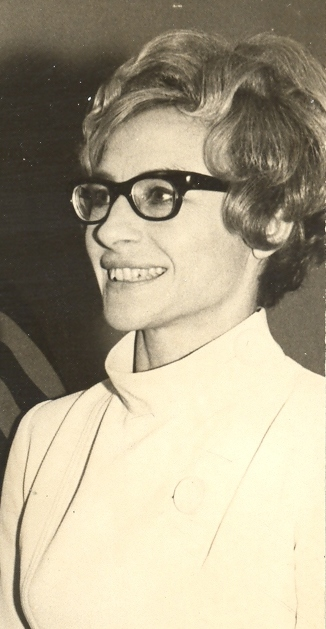
- Raymond in 1968
- Born: Sylvia Mona Sprigg; 1 June 1925; Smethwick, Sandwell, England
- Died: 17 March 2006 (aged 80); Auckland, New Zealand
- Spouse: Jack Metcalf (m. 1954; died 1985)

Cherry Raymond QSO (1 June 1925 – 17 March 2006) was an English-born New Zealand broadcaster, columnist and community worker.

== Early life ==
Born Sylvia Mona Sprigg in Smethwick, Sandwell, England, on 1 June 1925, Raymond was an only child. She emigrated to New Zealand with her parents in the aftermath of World War II.

== Career ==
Finding employment with the New Zealand Broadcasting Service, Raymond worked first as a receptionist and then as a radio reporter. From 1964 she was a columnist for the New Zealand Woman's Weekly for 10 years, and in the late 1960s she began her television career, as an interviewer on the current affairs show Close Up, and later as a regular on the New Zealand versions of Personality Squares and Beauty and the Beast.

Raymond was one of the organisers of the 1977 telethon on South Pacific Television that raised over $2,000,000 for the Mental Health Foundation, and went on to be the public affairs officer of that organisation as the funds were distributed. In the 1980s she was a panellist on Antiques For Love or Money.

Raymond was active in women's organisations, serving as president of the National Council of Women of New Zealand in 1970 and holding national and Australasian offices in Zonta. In October 1974, she stood unsuccessfully as a Values Party candidate for the Auckland Hospital Board. In the 1986 New Year Honours, Raymond was appointed a Companion of the Queen's Service Order for community service.

== Personal life ==
In 1954, Raymond married broadcaster Jack Metcalf; the couple had no children. He died in 1985. Raymond died in Auckland on 17 March 2006.

== See also ==
- List of New Zealand television personalities
