= Values Party =

Political party in New Zealand

- Founder: Tony Brunt
- Founded: 30 May 1972
- Dissolved: 1990
- Succeeded by: Green Party of Aotearoa New Zealand
- Ideology: Environmentalism; Progressivism
- Colours: Green

The Values Party was a New Zealand political party. It is considered the world's first national-level environmentalist party, pre-dating the use of "Green" as a political label. It was established in May 1972 at Victoria University of Wellington. Its first leader was Tony Brunt, and Geoff Neill, the party's candidate in the Dunedin North electorate, became the Deputy Leader.

== Policies and beliefs ==
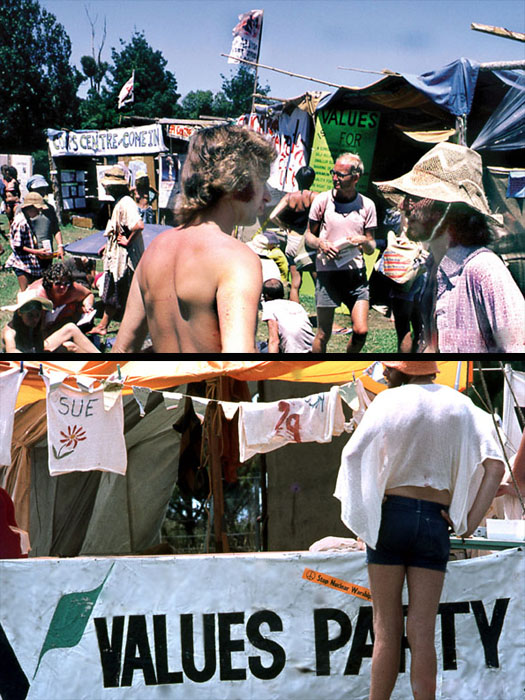
Values Party at the 1979 and 1981 Nambassa alternatives festival.

Several party manifestos sketched a progressive, semi-utopian blueprint for New Zealand's future as an egalitarian, ecologically sustainable society. The party appealed especially to those elements of the New Left who felt alienated by the small Marxist–Leninist parties of the day, and by the centre-left politics of the New Zealand Labour Party. From its beginning, the Values Party emphasised proposing alternative policies, rather than taking only an oppositionist stance to the ruling parties.

Values Party policies included campaigns against nuclear power and armaments, advocating zero-population and -economic growth, abortion, drug and homosexual law-reform. Although the Values Party never sat in parliament, it drew considerable attention to these topics. Many political scientists credit the Values Party with making the environment a political issue, and with prompting other parties – even the German Greens – to formulate their own environmental policies.

== Origins and organisation ==
The initial idea for a new New Zealand political party came in 1972 when Tony Brunt, then a political student at Victoria University, was reflecting on his own research into the Club of Rome's The Limits to Growth and Charles Reich's The Greening of America (among other publications). Brunt saw the potential for a new constituency driven by a new set of social and environmental values. Brunt met with his ex-New Zealand Herald colleague Norman Smith who immediately became the party's "1st hand man" and organiser. "The media experience of Brunt and Smith stood them in good stead when it came to publicising the new party, and a former colleague on the New Zealand Herald, Alison Webber founded the Auckland branch." At the first meeting of the nascent party on 30 May 1972 at Victoria University concern was raised that they had no support, structure, finances – "who is going to support this party?" There was a long pause and finally the young David Parkyn, having hitchhiked down from Auckland, stood and was the first to offer his support.

== Values Party contestation of elections ==
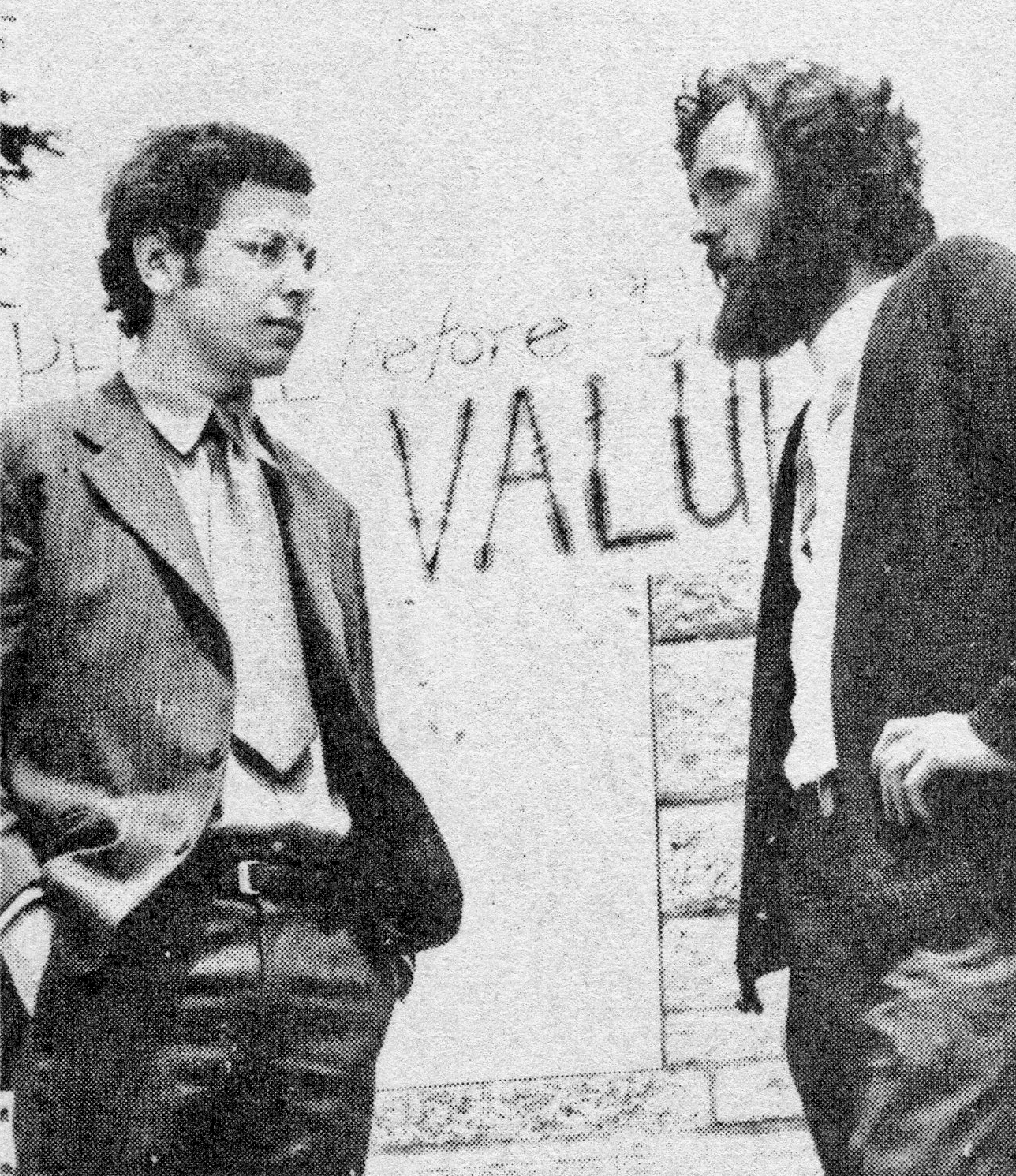
Values Party leader Tony Brunt (left) with Nelson candidate Alan Stanton in 1972.

The Values Party contested six general elections in 1972, 1975, 1978, 1981, 1984 and 1987. Despite strong showings in 1975 and 1978 it did not gain seats under the first-past-the-post electoral system in use at that time. It did however manage to get some candidates elected to local government. The first, Helen Smith of Titahi Bay, joined the Porirua City Council in 1973. In 1974, party leader Tony Brunt was elected as a Wellington City Councillor and was re-elected in 1977.

In 1974, several Values candidates also ran unsuccessfully for office in Auckland's local government elections, including lawyer Reg Clough, who stood as a Councillor and received more votes than five of the Labour candidates. Six candidates ran for the Auckland Hospital Board: Cherry Raymond (journalist and broadcaster) and Dr. Rex Hunton (medical director of the Auckland Medical Aid Centre) stood in the Auckland City ward; Keith Langton (lawyer) and Wayne Facer (university administrator) were in Waitemata City ward; Peter Wilcox (physician) and Isabella White (nurse) stood in the North Shore. Raymond was the strongest contender for the Hospital Board – receiving over 10,000 votes – though not enough to win a seat. In 1975, Keith Langton also stood in the general election in the New Lynn electorate, coming in fourth place.

Mike Ward was a Nelson City Councillor from 1983 to 1989 under a Values banner. Jon Mayson, a party co-leader in the 1980s, was elected a member of the Bay of Plenty Harbour Board on a Values Party ticket.

Under the leadership of polytechnic economics lecturer Tony Kunowski and deputy leader Margaret Crozier, the Values Party contested the 1978 general election with a considerable following, but again failed to win seats in parliament. Most probably this was mainly because voters at that time were more concerned about rapidly rising unemployment than anything else. The idea of an ecological "zero growth" society envisaged by Values Party members had met with the economic reality of near-zero GDP growth, high price-inflation, and an investment strike by business. Although gaining fewer votes than the New Zealand Labour Party, Robert Muldoon's National Party, which promised to create many more jobs by borrowing foreign funds to build large infrastructural projects (the so-called "Think Big" strategy, developing oil, gas, coal and electricity resources), was returned to government at the 1978 election. In the late 1970s the German Green Party wrote to the Values Party stating "we like your manifesto, can we use your policy?"

=== Electoral results ===
Election	candidates	seats won	votes	percentage
1972	42	0	27,467	1.96
1975	87	0	83,241	5.19
1978	92	0	41,220	2.41
1981	17	0	3,460	0.19
1984	29	0	3,826	0.20
1987	9	0	1,624	0.08

== Decline of the party ==
After the demoralising 1978 election result, the Values Party faced internal conflict between the "red" greens and the "fundamentalist" greens, and it fragmented amidst quarrels about organisational principles. Kunowski was ousted as party leader following the 1978 election leading him to pursue a career as a banker. He later joined the Labour Party and was elected to the Canterbury Regional Council on the Labour ticket. In May 1979 Margaret Crozier became the leader with Cathy Wilson as deputy leader; it was the first time women had led a political party in New Zealand.

In November 1980 Crozier stated she would resign as leader at the 1981 party conference, citing disagreements and instability in the party. At the April 1981 conference, delegates elected a three-way leadership with a "troika" of co-leaders. Janet Roborgh, Jon Mayson and Alan Wilkinson. The leadership reduced to two at the 1984 conference with Mayson and Wilkinson standing down and Mike Ward being elected alongside Roborgh. Roborgh resigned at the 1988 conference and was replaced by Rosalie Steward, previously Values candidate for West Coast.

By 1987 Values were using the description of the "Green Party of Aotearoa" and were increasingly advocating for proportional representation.

In July 1989 the ruling council of the party agreed in principle to wind up the party and balloted its 200 remaining members for approval. However, in May 1990, remnants of the Values Party merged with several other environmentalist organisations to form the Green Party of Aotearoa New Zealand, which entered parliament in 1996 and formed part of the Government in 2017. Many former members of the Values Party became active in the Green Party – notably Jeanette Fitzsimons, Rod Donald and Mike Ward.

== Party leadership ==
Another Values Party logo

Leaders

- Tony Brunt (1972–74)
- Reg Clough (1974–76)
- Tony Kunowski (1976–79)
- Margaret Crozier (1979–81)

Co-leaders

- Jon Mayson (1981–84)
- Alan Wilkinson (1981–84)
- Janet Roborgh (1981–88)
- Mike Ward (1984–90)
- Rosalie Steward (1988–90)

=== Partial list of local and/or central government candidates ===
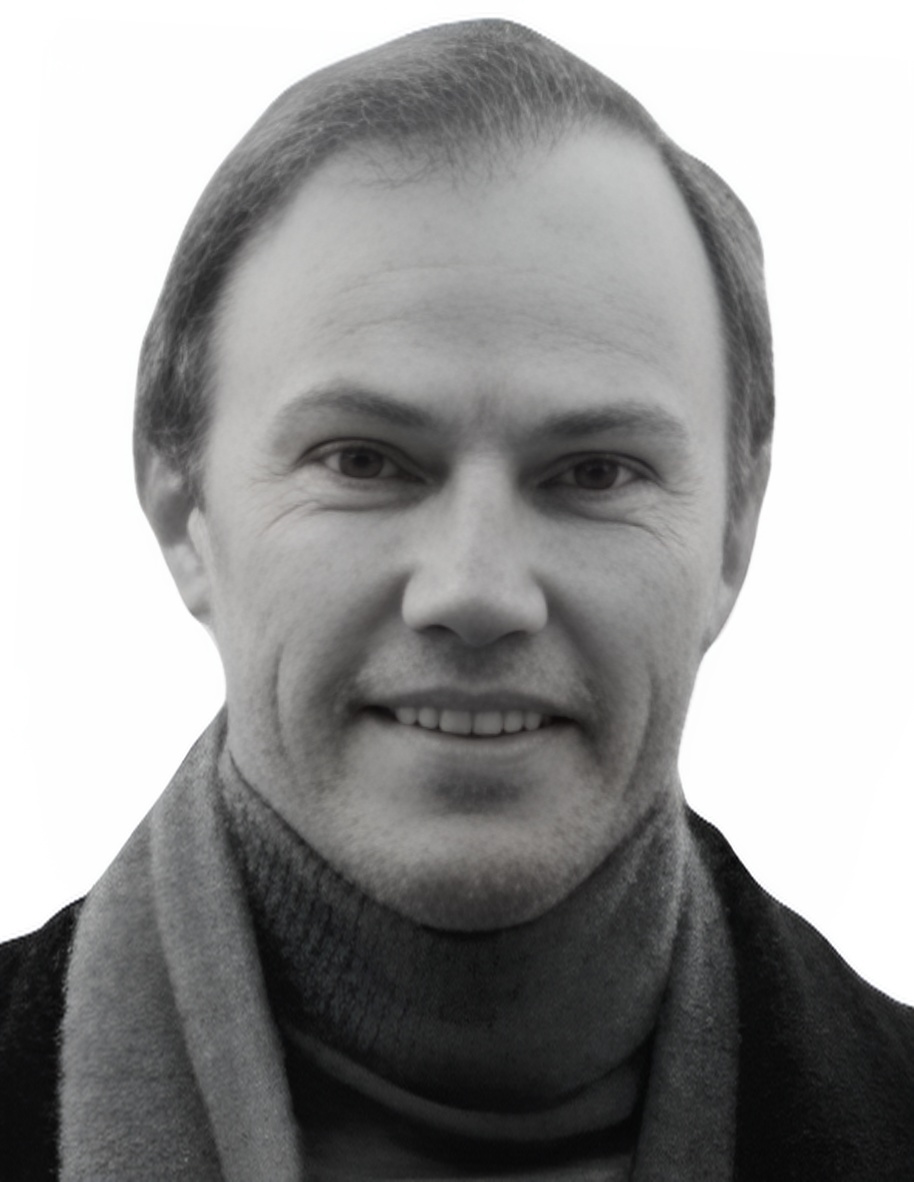
Wayne Facer

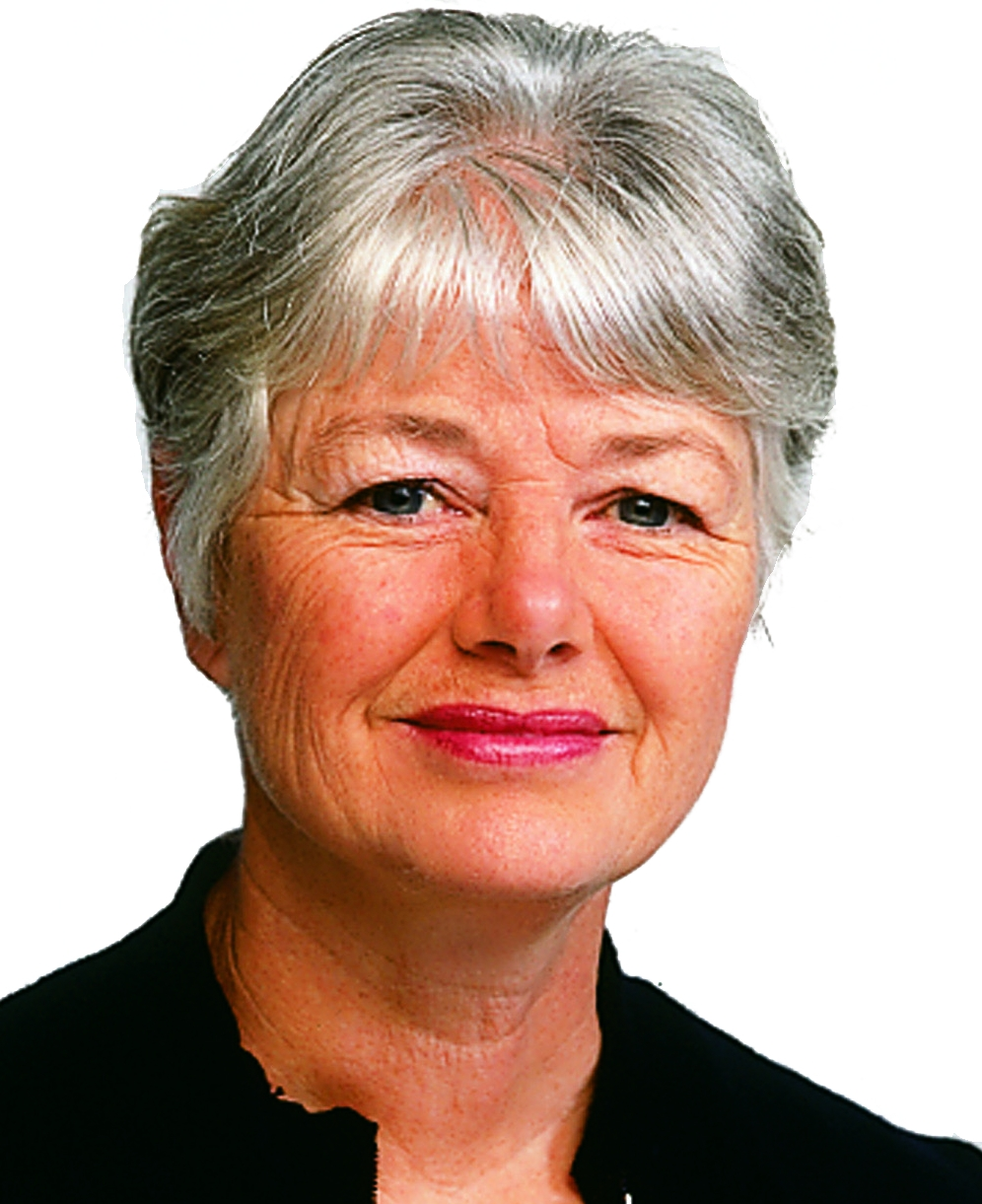
Jeanette Fitzsimons

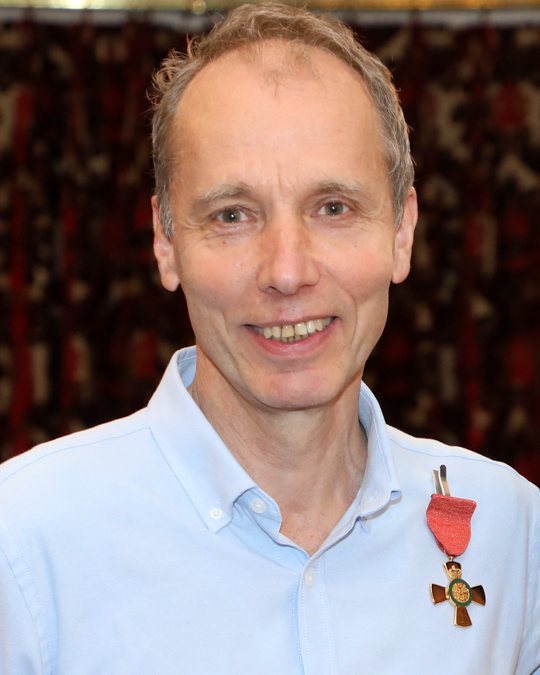
Nicky Hager

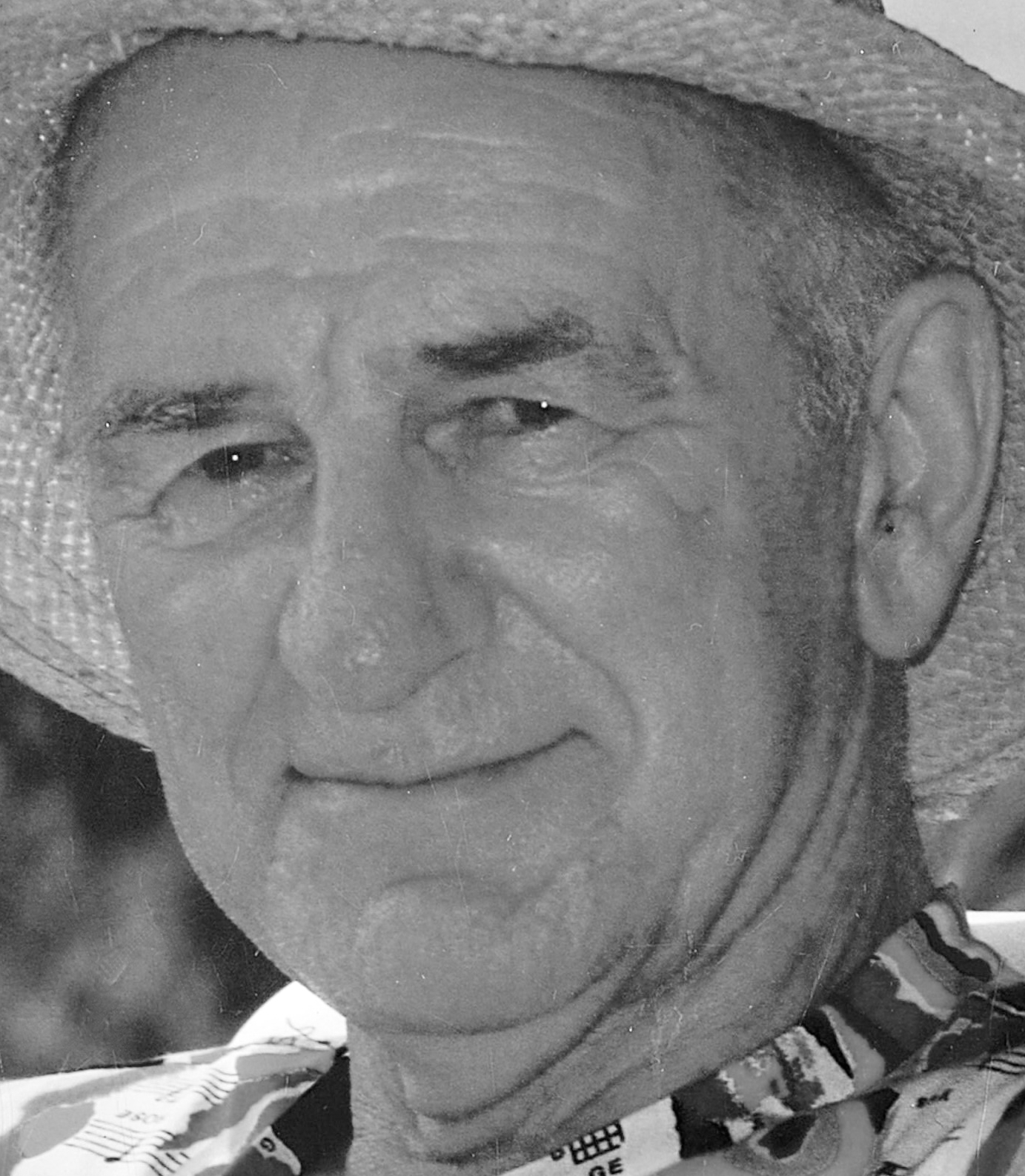
Rex Hunton

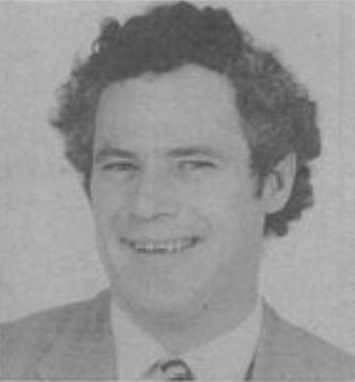
Terry McDavitt

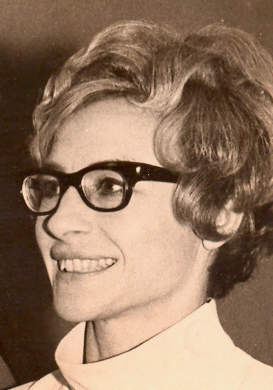
Cherry Raymond

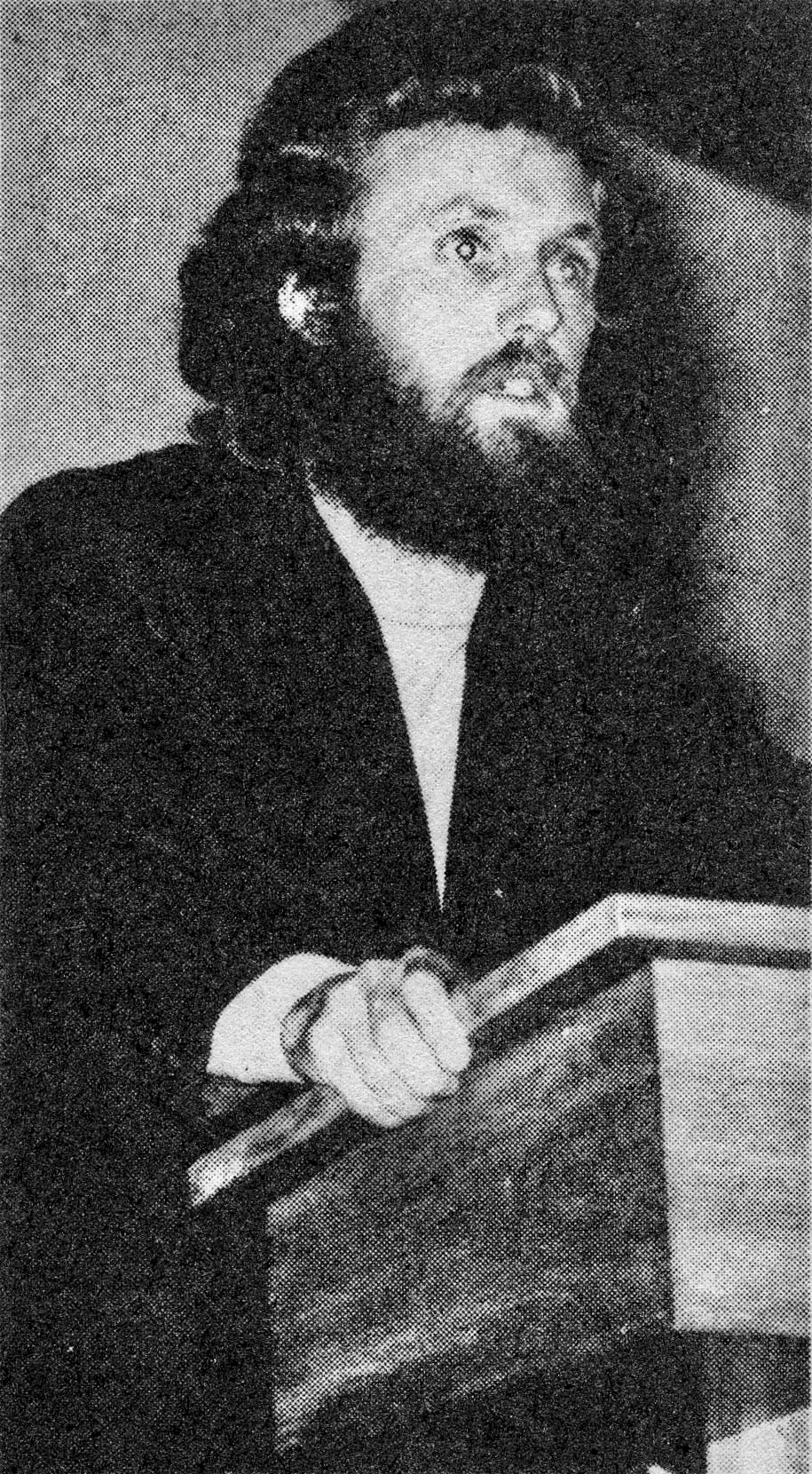
Alan Stanton

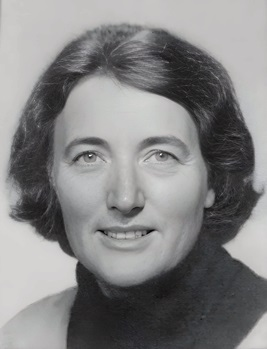
Helen Smith

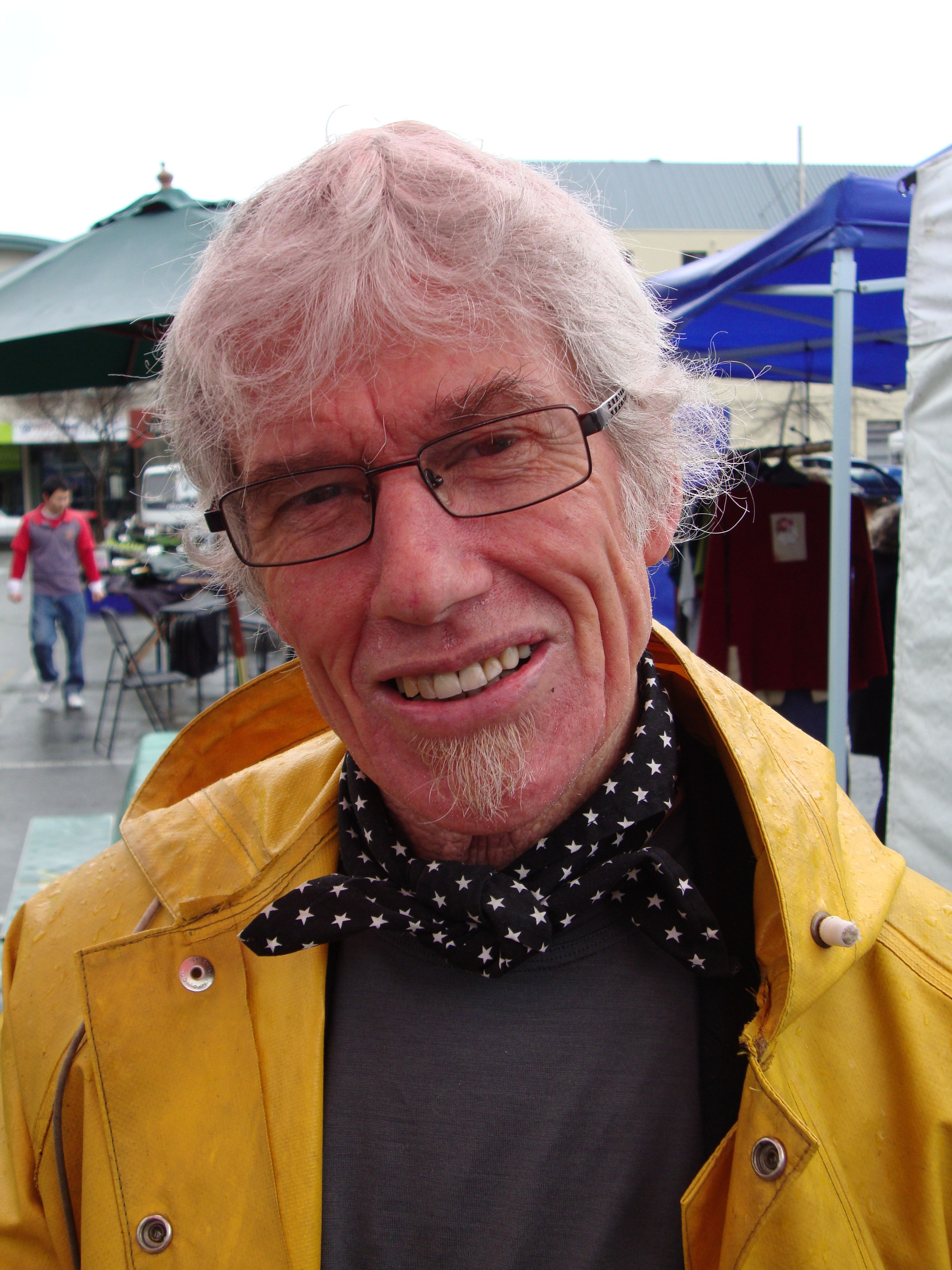
Mike Ward
